= 1933 =

1933 in various calendars
- Gregorian calendar: 1933; MCMXXXIII
- Ab urbe condita: 2686
- Armenian calendar: 1382; ԹՎ ՌՅՁԲ
- Assyrian calendar: 6683
- Baháʼí calendar: 89–90
- Balinese saka calendar: 1854–1855
- Bengali calendar: 1339–1340
- Berber calendar: 2883
- British Regnal year: 23 Geo. 5 – 24 Geo. 5
- Buddhist calendar: 2477
- Burmese calendar: 1295
- Byzantine calendar: 7441–7442
- Chinese calendar: 壬申年 (Water Monkey); 4630 or 4423 — to — 癸酉年 (Water Rooster); 4631 or 4424
- Coptic calendar: 1649–1650
- Discordian calendar: 3099
- Ethiopian calendar: 1925–1926
- Hebrew calendar: 5693–5694
- Hindu calendars
- Vikram Samvat: 1989–1990
- Shaka Samvat: 1854–1855
- Kali Yuga: 5033–5034
- Holocene calendar: 11933
- Igbo calendar: 933–934
- Iranian calendar: 1311–1312
- Islamic calendar: 1351–1352
- Japanese calendar: Shōwa 8 (昭和８年)
- Javanese calendar: 1863–1864
- Juche calendar: 22
- Julian calendar: Gregorian minus 13 days
- Korean calendar: 4266
- Minguo calendar: ROC 22 民國22年
- Nanakshahi calendar: 465
- Thai solar calendar: 2475–2476
- Tibetan calendar: ཆུ་ཕོ་སྤྲེ་ལོ་ (male Water-Monkey); 2059 or 1678 or 906 — to — ཆུ་མོ་བྱ་ལོ་ (female Water-Bird); 2060 or 1679 or 907

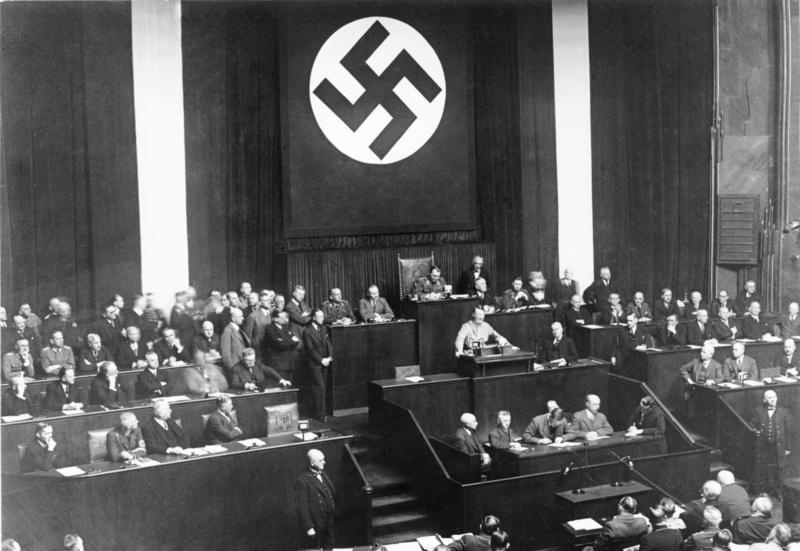
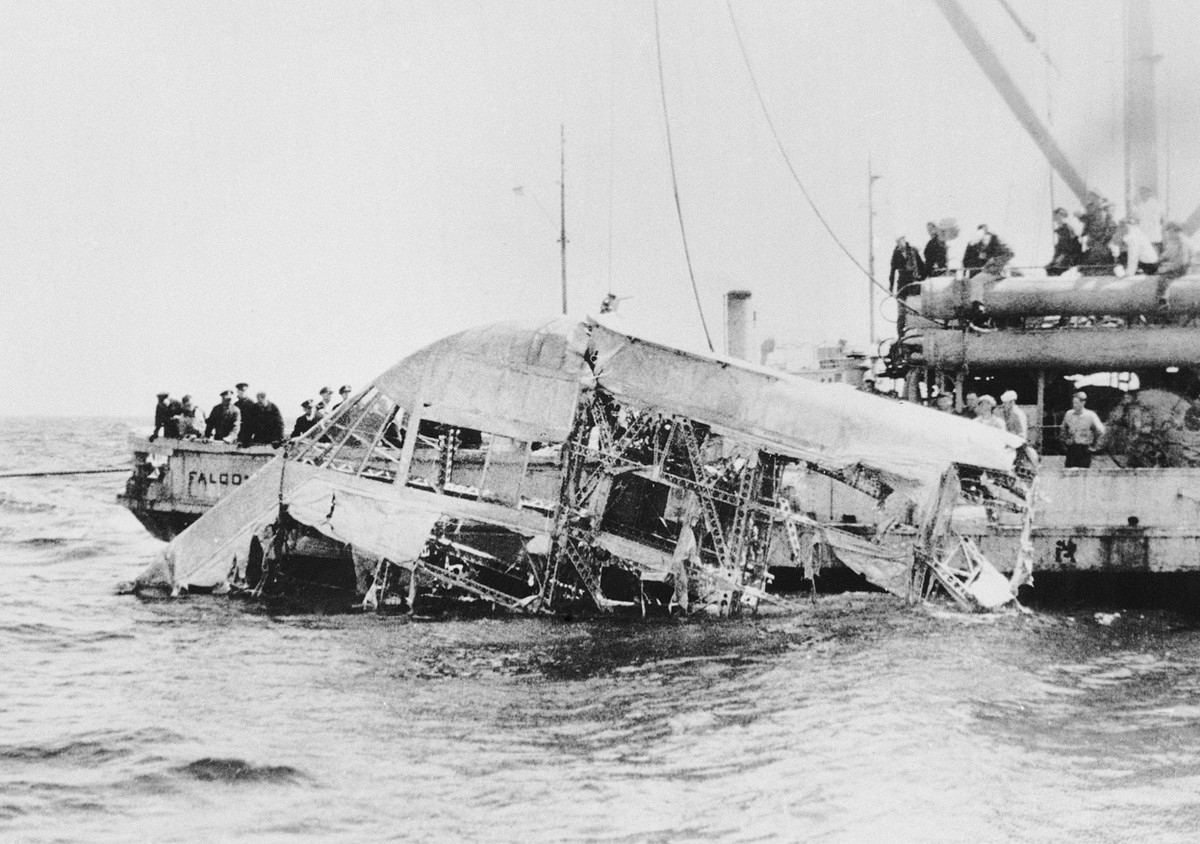
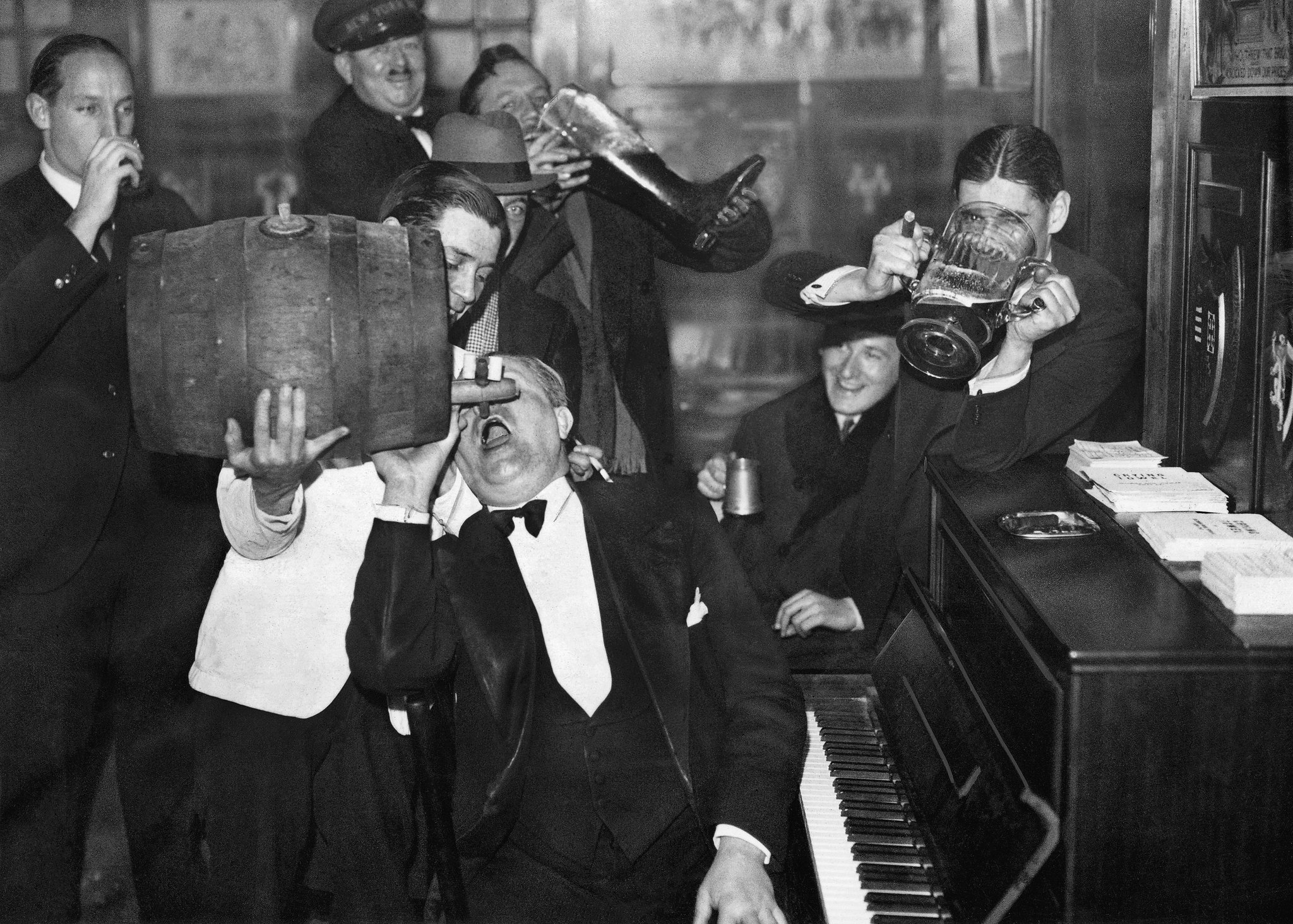
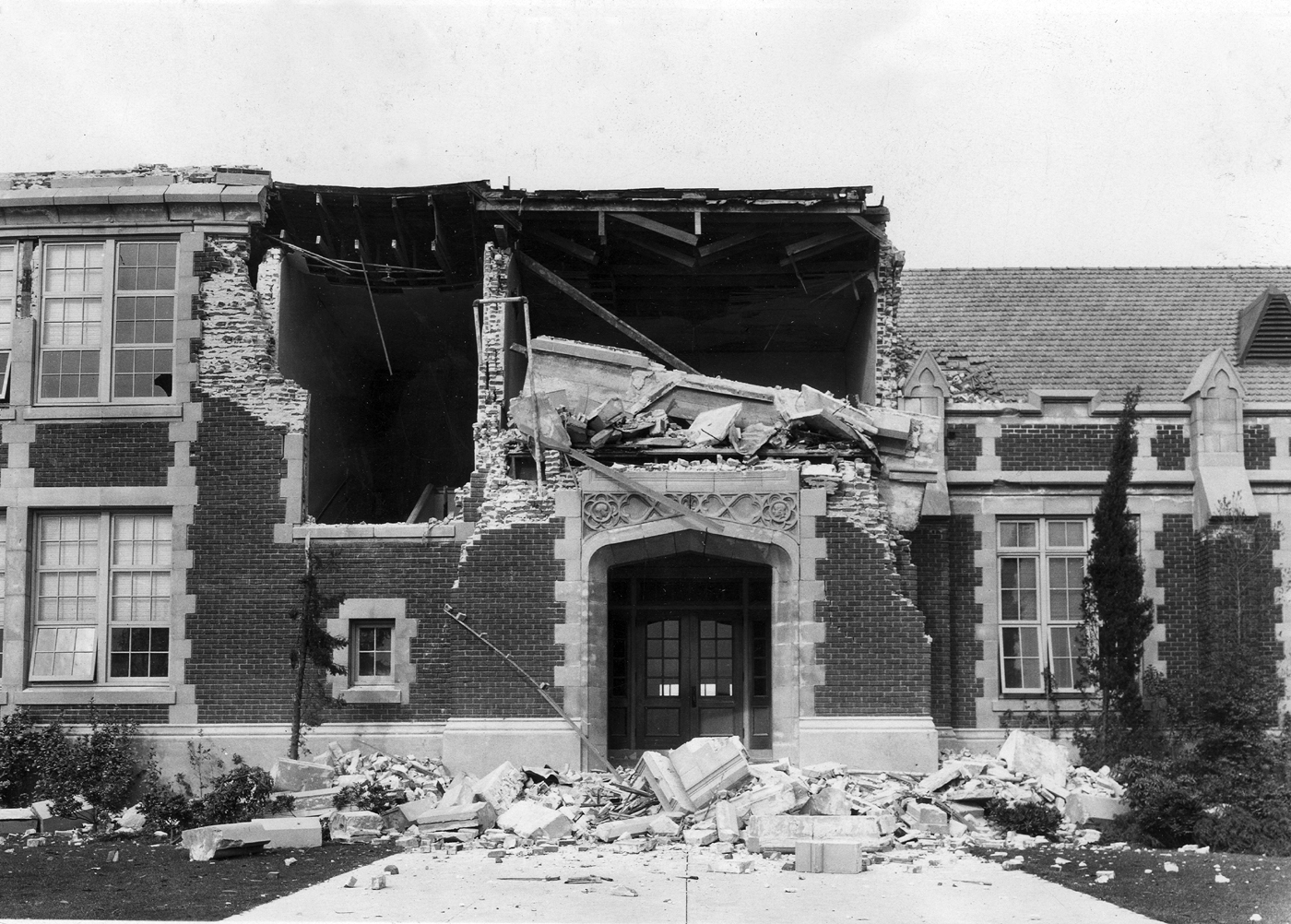
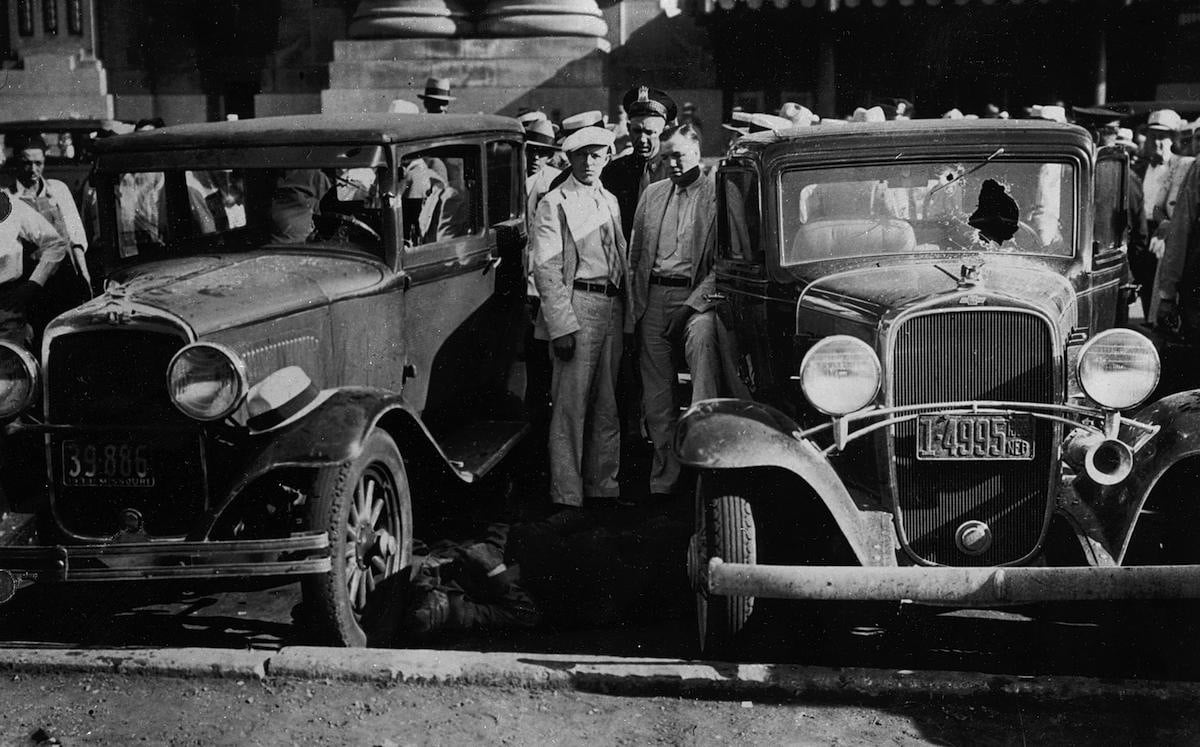
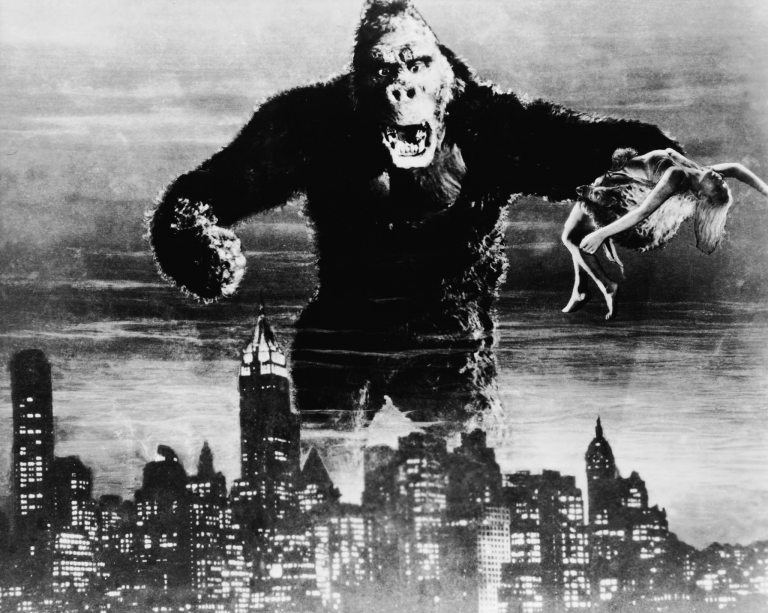
From top to bottom, left to right:
- The Enabling Act of 1933 grants Adolf Hitler dictatorial powers following the Reichstag fire, allowing the Nazis to suppress opposition;
- The USS Akron disaster kills 73 off the New Jersey coast, becoming one of the deadliest airship accidents;
- The Repeal of Prohibition in the United States ends the nationwide alcohol ban, restoring legal liquor sales after 13 years;
- The 1933 Long Beach earthquake strikes Southern California, killing 120 and prompting stricter building codes;
- The Kansas City massacre shocks the nation as gangsters ambush law enforcement, killing four;
- The release of King Kong captivates audiences with groundbreaking effects and iconic storytelling.

1933 (MCMXXXIII) was a common year starting on Sunday of the Gregorian calendar, the 1933rd year of the Common Era (CE) and Anno Domini (AD) designations, the 933rd year of the 2nd millennium, the 33rd year of the 20th century, and the 4th year of the 1930s decade.

== Events ==
=== January ===
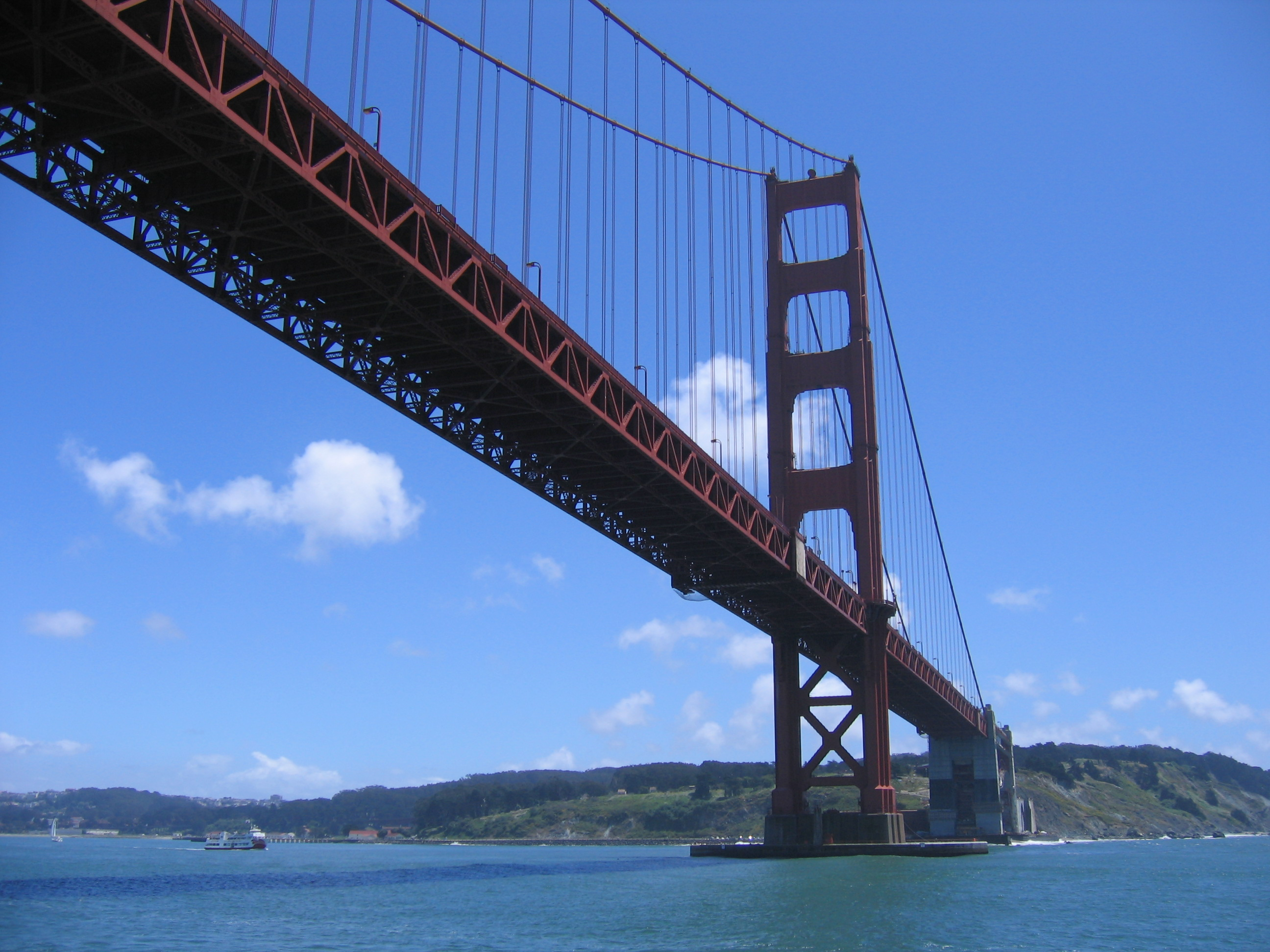
January 5: Construction of the Golden Gate Bridge begins.

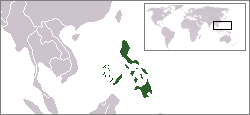
January 17: Vote on Philippines independence.

- January 11 – Australian aviator Sir Charles Kingsford Smith makes the first commercial flight between Australia and New Zealand.
- January 17 – The United States Congress votes in favour of Philippines independence, against the wishes of U.S. President Herbert Hoover.
- January 28 – "Pakistan Declaration": Choudhry Rahmat Ali publishes (in Cambridge, UK) a pamphlet entitled Now or Never; Are We to Live or Perish Forever?, in which he calls for the creation of a Muslim state in northwest India that he calls "Pakstan"; this influences the Pakistan Movement.
- January 30
  - Nazi Party leader Adolf Hitler is appointed Chancellor of Germany by President of Germany Paul von Hindenburg.
  - Édouard Daladier forms a government in France in succession to Joseph Paul-Boncour. He is succeeded on October 26 by Albert Sarraut and on November 26 by Camille Chautemps.

=== February ===
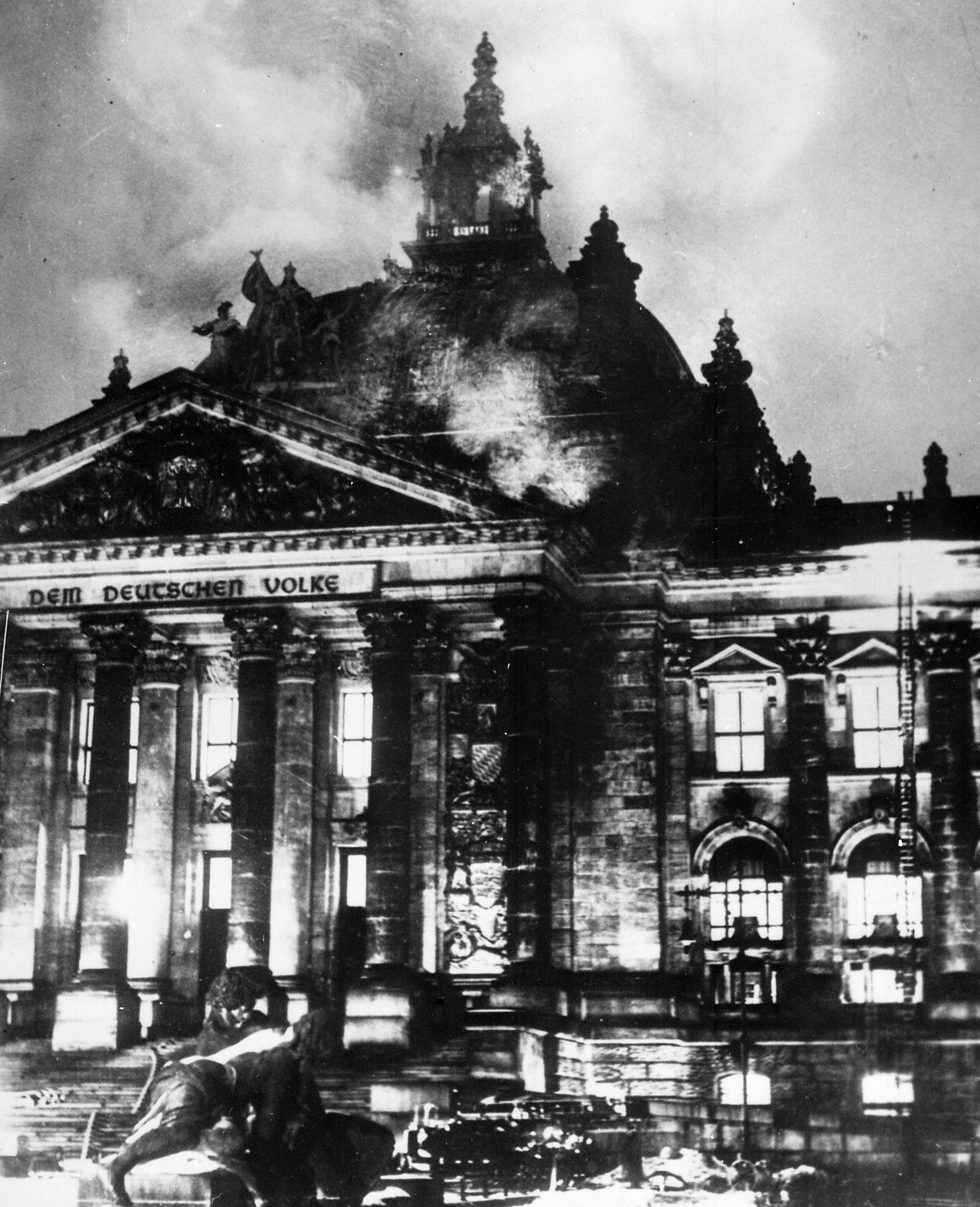
February 27: Reichstag fire

- February 1 – Adolf Hitler gives his "Proclamation to the German People" in Berlin.
- February 3 – Adolf Hitler gives a secret speech to his military leaders, outlining his plans to rearm Germany in defiance of the Treaty of Versailles and to adopt a policy of Lebensraum in eastern Europe.
- February 5 – A mutiny starts on the Royal Netherlands Navy coastal defence ship De Zeven Provinciën in the Dutch East Indies. After 6 days, it is bombed by a Dutch aircraft, killing 23 men, and the remaining mutineers surrender.
- February 6–7 – Officers on the USS Ramapo record a 34-meter high sea wave in the Pacific Ocean.
- February 9 – The King and Country debate: The Oxford Union student debating society in England passes a resolution stating, "That this House will in no circumstances fight for its King and country."
- February 10 – The New York City-based Postal Telegraph Company introduces the first singing telegram.
- February 15 – In Miami, Giuseppe Zangara attempts to assassinate President-elect Franklin D. Roosevelt, but instead fatally wounds the Mayor of Chicago, Anton Cermak. Zangara is executed on March 20 by the electric chair.
- February 17 – Repeal of Prohibition in the United States: The Blaine Act passes the United States Senate, submitting the proposed Twenty-first Amendment to the Constitution to the states for ratification. The amendment is ratified on December 5, ending prohibition in the United States.
- February 23 – The Imperial Japanese Army invades Rehe province in northern China.
- February 25 – Arminda de Jesus is burned for witchcraft in Soalhães, Portugal.
- February 27 – Reichstag fire: Germany's parliament building in Berlin, the Reichstag building, is set on fire under controversial circumstances. The following day, the Reichstag Fire Decree is passed in response to the Reichstag fire, nullifying many German civil liberties.
- February 28 – English cricket team in Australia in 1932–33: The England cricket team wins The Ashes using the controversial bodyline tactic.

=== March ===
- March 2 – King Kong: The original King Kong film, starring Fay Wray and directed by Merian C. Cooper, debuts in New York City.
- March 3 – 1933 Sanriku earthquake: A powerful earthquake and tsunami hit Honshū, Japan, killing approximately 3,000 people.
- March 4
  - The Parliament of Austria is suspended because of a quibble over procedure; Chancellor Engelbert Dollfuss initiates authoritarian rule by decree, an origin of Austrofascism.
  - Franklin D. Roosevelt is sworn in as the 32nd president of the United States.
- March 5
  - The Great Depression: President Franklin D. Roosevelt declares a "Bank holiday", closing all United States banks and freezing all financial transactions (the 'holiday' ends on March 13).
  - March 1933 German federal election: The Nazi Party gains 43.9% of the votes.
- March 10 – The 6.4 M_{w} Long Beach earthquake shakes Southern California with a maximum Mercalli intensity of VIII (Severe), killing 115 people.
- March 15
  - The Dow Jones Industrial Average rises from 53.84 to 62.10. The day's gain of 15.34%, achieved during the depths of the Great Depression, remains the largest 1-day percentage gain for the index.
  - Austrian Chancellor Engelbert Dollfuss keeps members of the National Council from convening, starting the Austrofascist dictatorship.
- March 20 – Dachau, the first Nazi concentration camp, is completed in Germany (it opens March 22 to hold political prisoners).
- March 22 – President Franklin Roosevelt signs the Cullen–Harrison Act, an amendment to the Volstead Act, allowing the manufacture and sale from April 7 of "3.2 beer" (3.2% alcohol by weight, approximately 4% alcohol by volume) and light wines, 8 months before the full repeal of Prohibition in the United States in December.
- March 23 – Gleichschaltung: The Reichstag passes the Enabling Act, making Adolf Hitler effectively the dictator of Germany.
- March 27 – Japan announces it will leave the League of Nations (due to a cancellation period of exactly two years, the egression becomes effective March 27, 1935).
- March 29 – Welsh journalist Gareth Jones makes the first report in the West of the Holodomor famine genocide in Ukraine.
- March 31 – The Civilian Conservation Corps is established in the United States as an unemployment relief program.

=== April ===
- April 1 – The recently elected Nazis (under Julius Streicher) organize a one-day boycott of all Jewish-owned businesses in Germany.
- April 2 – As a member of the English cricket team touring New Zealand, 1933, batsman Wally Hammond scores a record 336 runs in a test match at Eden Park, Auckland.
- April 3
  - An anti-monarchist rebellion occurs in Siam (Thailand).
  - The first flight over Mount Everest is made by the British Houston-Mount Everest Flight Expedition, led by the Marquis of Clydesdale, and funded by Lucy, Lady Houston.
- April 4 – American airship Akron crashes off the coast of New Jersey, killing 73 of its 76 crewmen. It is the worst aviation accident in history up to this date (and until 1950).
- April 5
  - The International Court of Justice in The Hague decides that Greenland belongs to Denmark, and condemns Norwegian landings on eastern Greenland. Norway submits to the decision.
  - United States President Franklin D. Roosevelt declares a national emergency and issues Executive Order 6102, making it illegal for U.S. citizens to own substantial amounts of monetary gold or bullion.
- April 7 – In Germany, the Law for the Restoration of the Professional Civil Service is passed, the first law of the new regime directed against Jews (as well as political opponents).
- April 11 – Aviator Bill Lancaster takes off from Lympne in England, in an attempt to make a speed record to the Cape of Good Hope, but vanishes (his body is not found in the Sahara Desert until 1962).
- April 13 – The Children and Young Persons Act is passed in the United Kingdom. This raises the age of criminal responsibility from 7 to 8, raises the minimum age for capital punishment to 18, places restrictions on the identification in the press of persons under 18 appearing in court, sets a minimum full-time working age of 14 and makes it illegal to sell tobacco products to under-16s.
- April 21 – Nazi Germany outlaws the kosher ritual shechita.
- April 24 – In Nazi Germany:
  - Persecution of Jehovah's Witnesses begins with the seizure of the Bible Students' office in Magdeburg.
  - Jewish physicians are excluded from official insurance schemes, forcing many to give up their practices.
- April 26 – The Gestapo secret police is established in Nazi Germany by Hermann Göring.
- April 27 – The Stahlhelm veterans' organization joins the Nazi party in Germany.

=== May ===
- May 2 – Gleichschaltung: Adolf Hitler prohibits trade unions.
- May 3
  - In the Irish Free State, Dáil Éireann abolishes the oath of allegiance to the British Crown.
  - Nellie Tayloe Ross becomes the first woman to be named director of the United States Mint.
- May 5 – The detection by Karl Jansky of radio waves from the center of the Milky Way Galaxy is reported in The New York Times. The discovery leads to the birth of radio astronomy.
- May 8 – Mohandas Gandhi begins a 3-week hunger strike because of the mistreatment of the lower castes in India.
- May 10 – Chaco War: Paraguay formally declares war on Bolivia.
- May 17 – Vidkun Quisling and Johan Bernhard Hjort form the Nasjonal Samling (the National Gathering Party) of Norway.
- May 18 – New Deal: President Franklin Delano Roosevelt signs an act creating the Tennessee Valley Authority.
- May 26 – The Nazi Party in Germany introduces a law to legalize eugenic sterilization.
- May 27
  - New Deal in the United States: The Federal Securities Act is signed into law, requiring the registration of securities with the Federal Trade Commission.
  - The Century of Progress World's Fair opens in Chicago.

=== June ===
- June – The Holodomor famine-genocide in Ukraine reaches its peak, with 30,000 deaths from human-made starvation each day. The average life expectancy for a Ukrainian male born this year is 7.3 years.
- June 5 – The U.S. Congress abrogates the United States use of the gold standard, by enacting a joint resolution nullifying the right of creditors to demand payment in gold.
- June 6 – The first drive-in movie theater is opened in Pennsauken Township, near Camden, New Jersey, by Richard Hollingshead, according to his patent granted May 16.
- June 12 – The London Economic Conference is held.
- June 17 – Kansas City massacre: At the Union Station in Kansas City, Missouri, gangsters kill four law enforcement officers and detained fugitive bank robber Frank Nash.
- June 22 – Nazi Germany outlaws the Social-Democratic Party (SPD).
- June 25 – Wilmersdorfer Tennishallen delegates convene in Berlin to protest against the persecution of Jehovah's Witnesses in Nazi Germany.

=== July ===
- July 1
  - The London Passenger Transport Board begins operation.
  - Business Plot: Smedley Butler becomes involved in a coup attempt led by Gerald MacGuire against the President of the United States Franklin Delano Roosevelt which fails (according to his testimony in 1934).
- July 4 – Gandhi is sentenced to prison in India.
- July 6 – The first Major League Baseball All-Star Game is played at Comiskey Park in Chicago.
- July 8 – The first rugby union test match is played between the Wallabies of Australia and the Springboks of South Africa, at Newlands in Cape Town.
- July 14 – In Nazi Germany:
  - Formation of new political parties is forbidden.
  - The Law for the Prevention of Hereditarily Diseased Offspring is enacted, allowing compulsory sterilization of citizens suffering from a list of alleged genetic disorders.
- July 15
  - The Four-Power Pact is signed by Britain, France, Germany and Italy.
  - The International Left Opposition (ILO) is renamed the International Communist League (ICL).
- July 20 – Reichskonkordat: Vatican state secretary Eugenio Pacelli (later Pope Pius XII) signs an accord with Germany.
- July 22 – Wiley Post becomes the first person to fly solo around the world, landing at Floyd Bennett Field in Brooklyn, New York, after traveling eastbound 15,596 mi (25,099 km) in 7 days 18 hours 45 minutes.

=== August ===
- August 2 – The White Sea–Baltic Canal, Stalin's 227 km ship canal constructed using forced labour in the Soviet Union, opens, connecting the White Sea with Lake Onega and the Baltic.
- August 7 – Simele massacre: More than 3,000 Assyrian Iraqis are killed by Iraqi government troops.
- August 12 – British politician Winston Churchill makes his first speech publicly warning of the dangers of German rearmament.
- August 14 – Loggers cause a forest fire in the Coast Range of Oregon, later known as the first forest fire of the Tillamook Burn. It is extinguished on September 5, after destroying 240,000 acres (970 km^{2}).
- August 25 – The Diexi earthquake shakes Mao County, Sichuan, China and kills 9,000 people.
- August 30 – German-Jewish philosopher Theodor Lessing is shot in Marienbad (Mariánské Lázně), Czechoslovakia, dying the following day.

=== September ===
- September 12
  - Alejandro Lerroux forms a new government in Spain.
  - Leó Szilárd, waiting for a red light on Southampton Row in Bloomsbury (London), conceives the idea of the nuclear chain reaction.
- September 26 – 1933 Tampico hurricane: A hurricane destroys the town of Tampico, Mexico.

=== October ===
- October 1 – Engelbert Dollfuss, leader of the Fatherland's Front in Austria, is seriously injured in a failed assassination attempt.
- October 7 – Air France is formed by the merger of five French airline companies, beginning operations with 250 planes.
- October 10 – 1933 United Airlines Boeing 247 mid-air explosion: A bomb destroys a United Airlines Boeing 247 on a transcontinental flight in mid-air near Chesterton, Indiana, killing all 7 on board, in the first proven case of sabotage in civil aviation, although no suspect is ever identified.
- October 12 – The United States Army Disciplinary Barracks on Alcatraz is acquired by the United States Department of Justice, which plans to incorporate the island into its Federal Bureau of Prisons as a penitentiary.
- October 14 – Germany announces its withdrawal from the League of Nations and the World Disarmament Conference, after the U.S., the U.K. and France deny its request to increase its defence armaments under the Versailles Treaty.
- October 14–16 – The new constitution of Estonia is approved only on the third consecutive referendum.
- October 16 – Parricides committed in the United States by Victor Licata lead to calls for the legal prohibition of cannabis.
- October 17 – Scientist Albert Einstein arrives from Europe in the United States, where he settles permanently as a refugee from Nazi Germany and takes up a position at the Institute for Advanced Study, Princeton, New Jersey.

=== November ===
- November 5 – Spanish Basque people vote for autonomy.
- November 8 – New Deal: U.S. President Franklin D. Roosevelt unveils the Civil Works Administration, an organization designed to create jobs for more than 4 million of the unemployed.
- November 11 – Dust Bowl: In South Dakota, a very strong dust storm ("the great black blizzard") strips topsoil from desiccated farmlands (one of a series of disastrous dust storms this year).
- November 16
  - The United States and the Soviet Union establish formal diplomatic relations.
  - American aviator Jimmie Angel becomes the first foreigner to see the Angel Falls in Venezuela (they are named after him).
- November 19 – Second Spanish Republic: General elections result in a victory by the right-wing parties.
- November 22 – The Fujian People's Government is declared in Fujian Province, China.

=== December ===
- December 5 – The Twenty-first Amendment to the United States Constitution is ratified, repealing Prohibition in the United States, making production and sale of alcohol legal in the U.S.
- December 17 – The first NFL Championship game in American football is played. The Chicago Bears defeat the New York Giants 23–21.
- December 21 – Newfoundland returns to Crown colony status, following financial collapse.
- December 23 – Lagny-Pomponne rail accident: A train collision near Lagny-sur-Marne in France kills 204.
- December 26
  - Montevideo Convention on the Rights and Duties of States is signed by participants in the 7th International Conference of American States; it is significant in the development of the declarative theory of statehood.
  - The Nissan Motor Company is organized in Tokyo, Japan.
  - FM radio is patented.
- December 29 – Members of the Iron Guard assassinate Ion Gheorghe Duca, prime minister of Romania.

=== Date unknown ===
- Turkey concludes a treaty with the creditors of the former Ottoman Empire to schedule the payments in Paris (Turkey succeeds in clearing all the debt in less than twenty years).
- The Advisory Committee of Experts on Slavery is created by the League of Nations.
- The first dated Inter-School Christian Fellowship group is started in Australia at North Sydney Boys High School, with the group continuing into the 21st century.

== Births ==
=== January ===
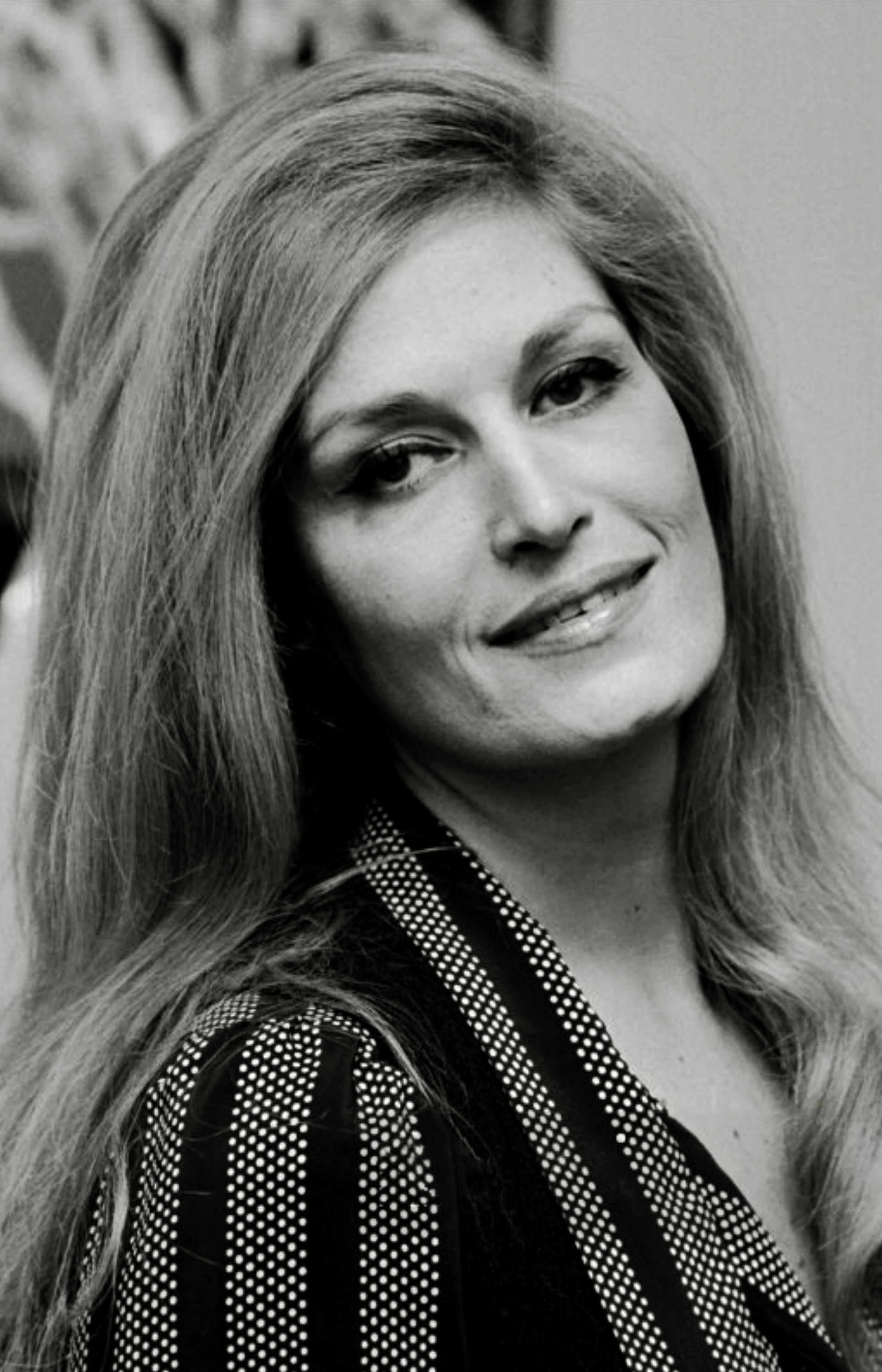
Dalida

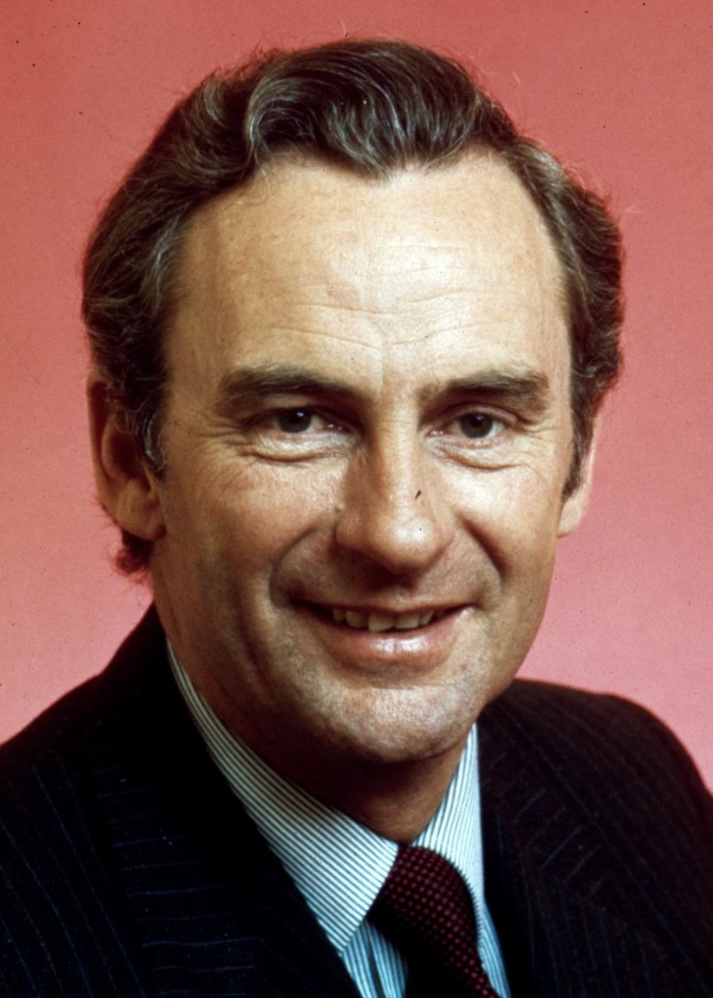
Bill Hayden

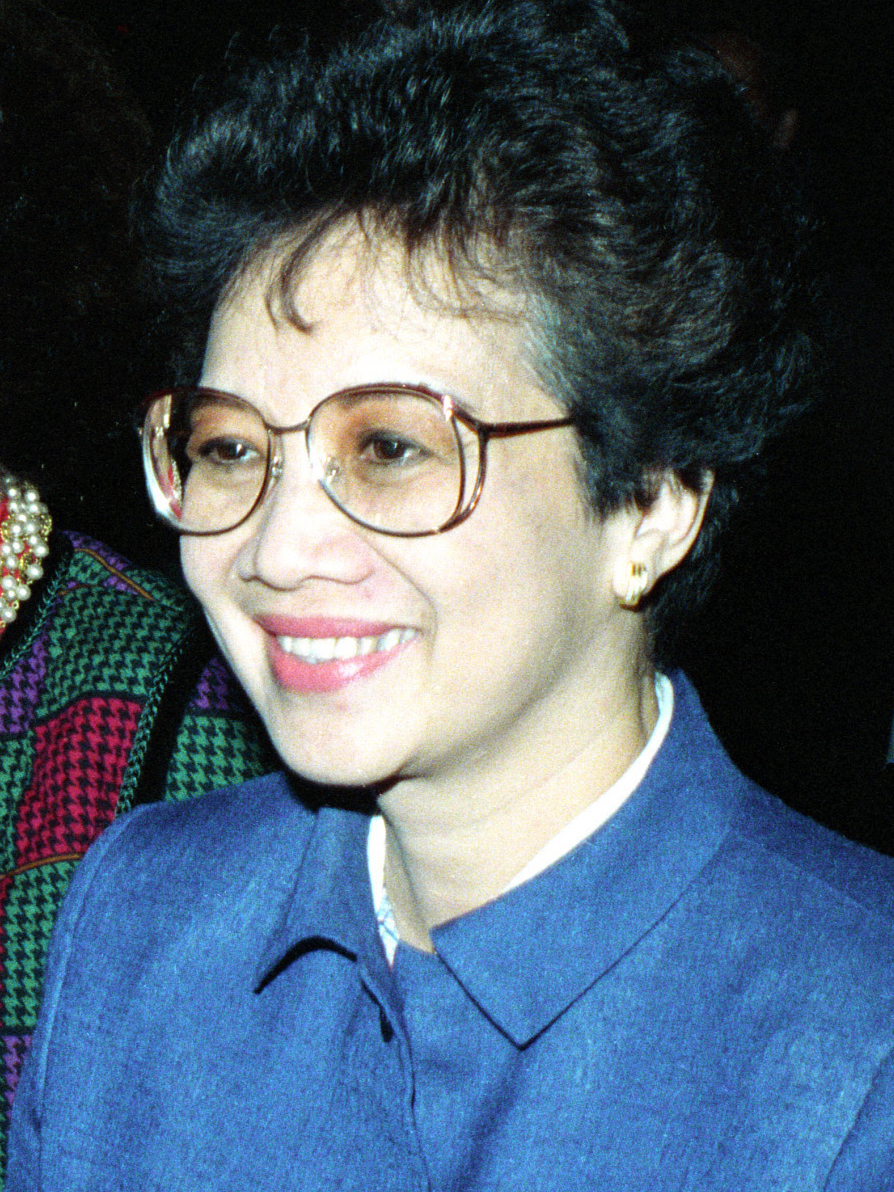
Corazon Aquino

- January 1 – Joe Orton, English playwright (d. 1967)
- January 2 – On Kawara, Japanese conceptual artist (d. 2014)
- January 6 – Oleg Grigoryevich Makarov, Russian cosmonaut (d. 2003)
- January 8 – Supriya Devi, Indian Bengali actress (d. 2018)
- January 12 – Liliana Cavani, Italian film director and screenwriter
- January 13 – Tom Gola, American basketball player (d. 2014)
- January 14 – Stan Brakhage, American filmmaker (d. 2003)
- January 16 – Susan Sontag, American author (d. 2004)
- January 17
  - Dalida, French singer (d. 1987)
  - Shari Lewis, American ventriloquist (d. 1998)
  - Prince Sadruddin Aga Khan, French U.N. High Commissioner for Refugees (d. 2003)
- January 18
  - David Bellamy, English author, broadcaster, environmental campaigner and botanist (d. 2019)
  - John Boorman, English film director
- January 21 – Habib Thiam, Senegal politician (d. 2017)
- January 23
  - Bill Hayden, Australian politician, 21st Governor-General of Australia (d. 2023)
  - Chita Rivera, American actress, dancer (d. 2024)
- January 25 – Corazon Aquino, 11th President of the Philippines (d. 2009)

=== February ===
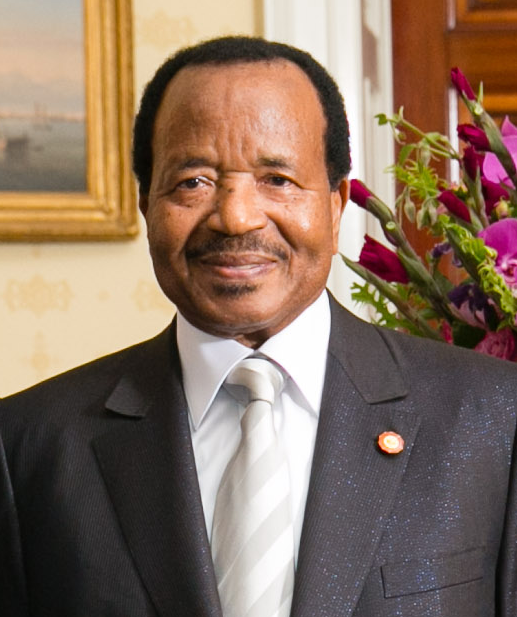
Paul Biya

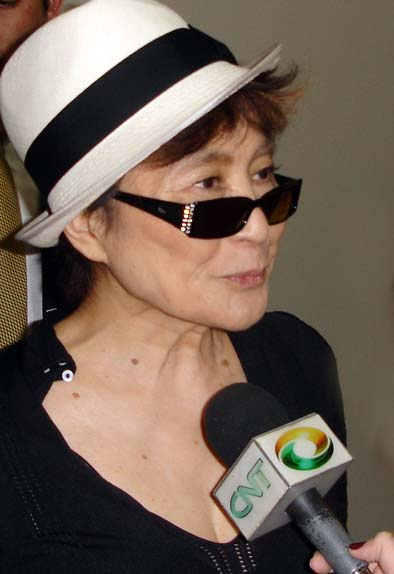
Yoko Ono

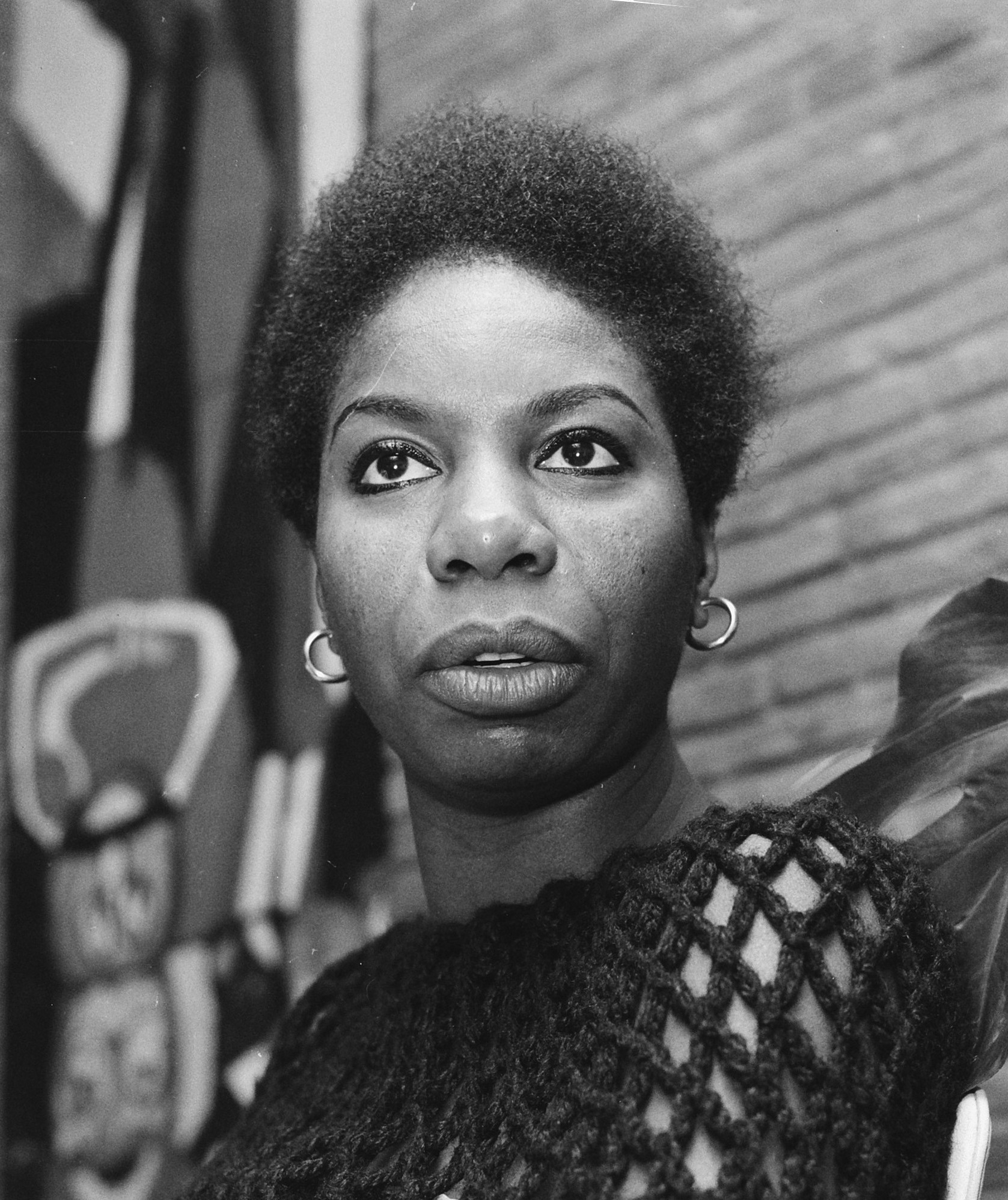
Nina Simone

- February 2 – Tony Jay, English-American actor and voice artist (d. 2006)
- February 5 – Miguel d'Escoto Brockmann, Nicaraguan diplomat, politician and priest (d. 2017)
- February 8
  - Archduke Joseph Árpád of Austria, Austro-Hungarian royal (d. 2017)
  - Elly Ameling, Dutch soprano
- February 12 – Costa-Gavras, Greek-born director, writer
- February 13
  - Paul Biya, 2nd President of Cameroon
  - Kim Novak, American actress
  - Emanuel Ungaro, French fashion designer (d. 2019)
- February 14 – Madhubala, Indian actress (d. 1969)
- February 17 – Syed Sajjad Ali Shah, 13th Chief Justice of Pakistan (d. 2017)
- February 18
  - Yoko Ono, Japanese-born artist and musician, widow of John Lennon
  - Sir Bobby Robson, English soccer player, manager (d. 2009)
  - Frank Moores, second Premier of Newfoundland and Labrador (d. 2005)
- February 21 – Nina Simone, African-American singer (d. 2003)
- February 22
  - Katharine, Duchess of Kent, British royal, musician and patron of the arts (d. 2025)
  - Christopher Ondaatje, Ceylonese-born travel writer, biographer and philanthropist
- February 26 – Lubomyr Husar, Ukrainian Catholic bishop (d. 2017)
- February 28 – Charles Vinci, American weightlifter (d. 2018)

=== March ===
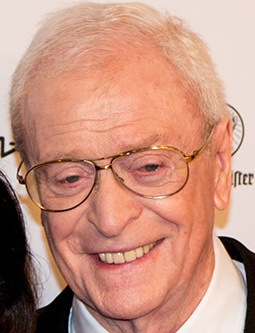
Michael Caine

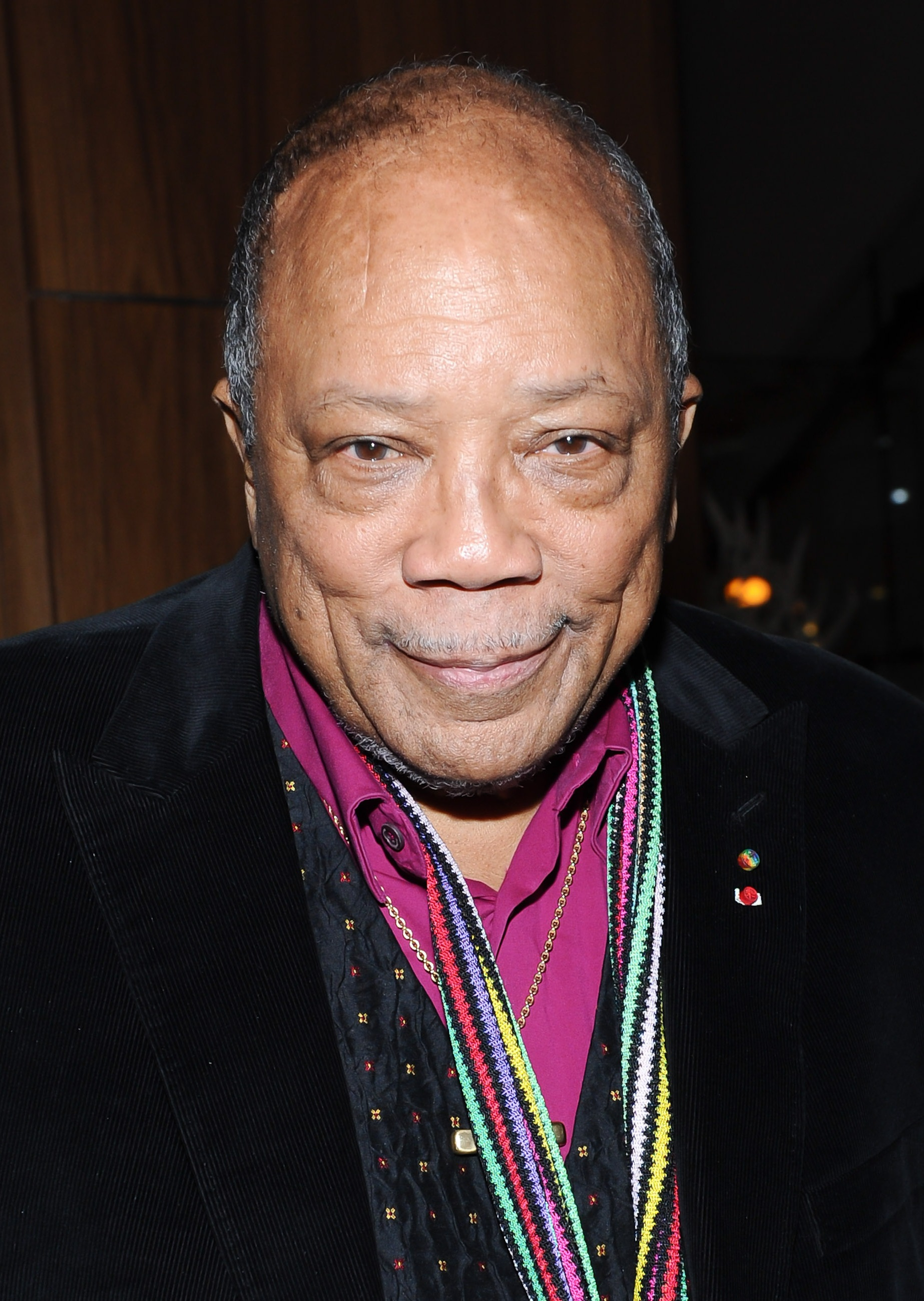
Quincy Jones

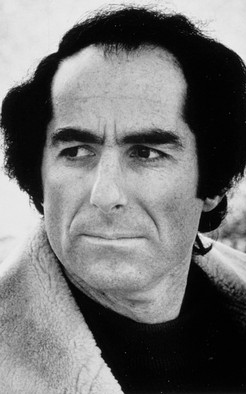
Philip Roth

- March 3
  - Tomas Milian, Cuban-American-Italian actor (d. 2017)
  - Lee Radziwill, American socialite, sister of Jacqueline Kennedy Onassis (d. 2019)
- March 7 – Jackie Blanchflower, Northern Irish footballer (d. 1998)
- March 12 – Jesús Gil, Spanish right-wing politician, construction businessman and football team owner (d. 2004)
- March 13 – Mike Stoller, American songwriter
- March 14
  - Sir Michael Caine, English actor and author
  - René Felber, Swiss Federal Councillor (d. 2020)
  - Quincy Jones, African-American music producer, composer (d. 2024)
- March 15 – Ruth Bader Ginsburg, Associate Justice of the Supreme Court of the United States (d. 2020)
- March 18 – Unita Blackwell, African-American civil rights activist (d. 2019)
- March 19 – Philip Roth, American novelist (d. 2018)
- March 22 – Abolhassan Banisadr, 1st President of Iran (d. 2021)

=== April ===
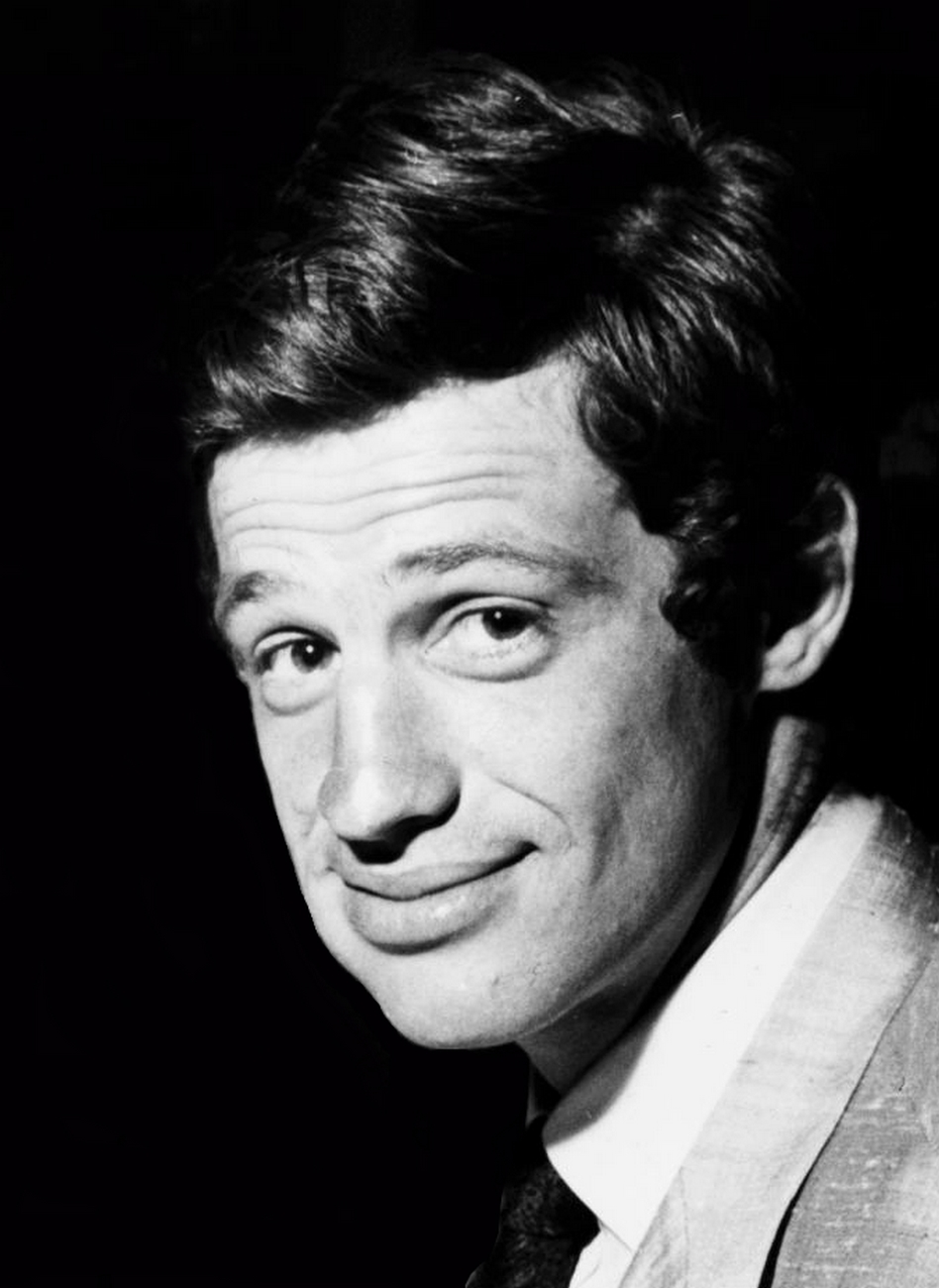
Jean-Paul Belmondo

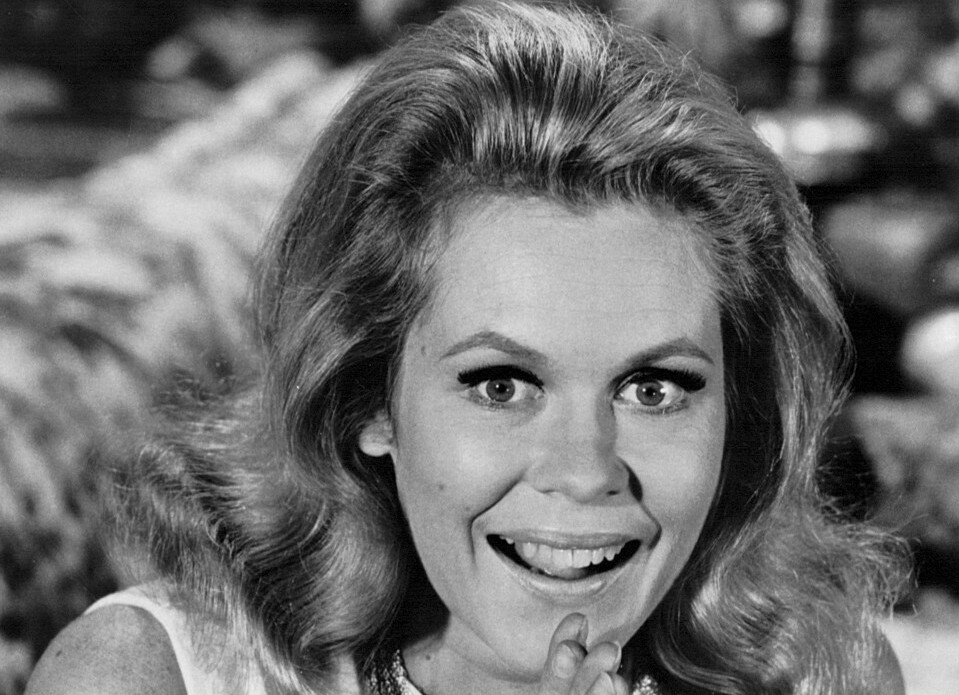
Elizabeth Montgomery

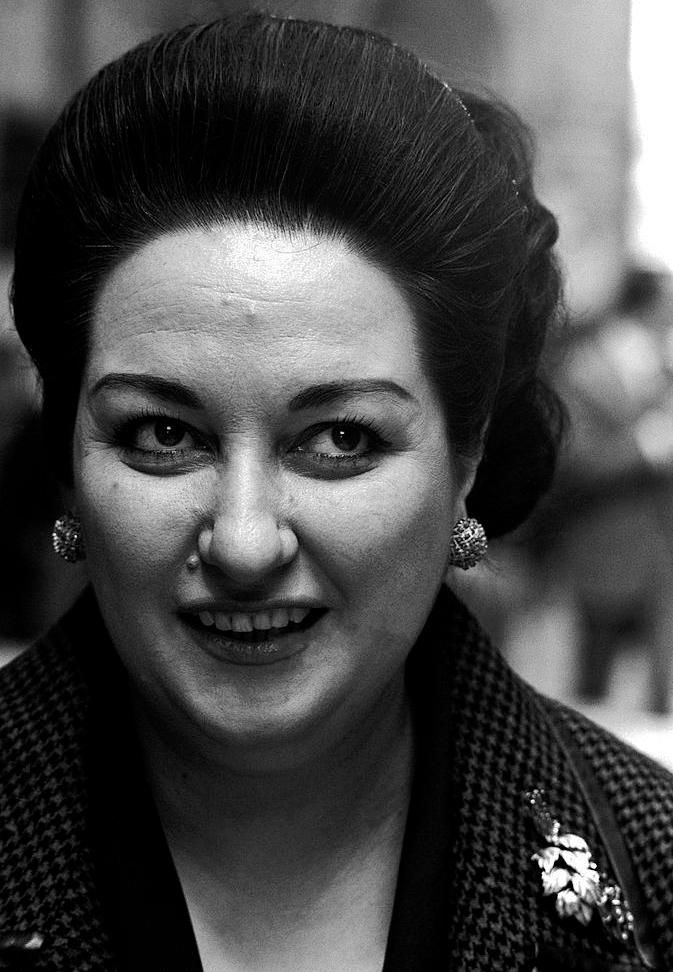
Montserrat Caballé

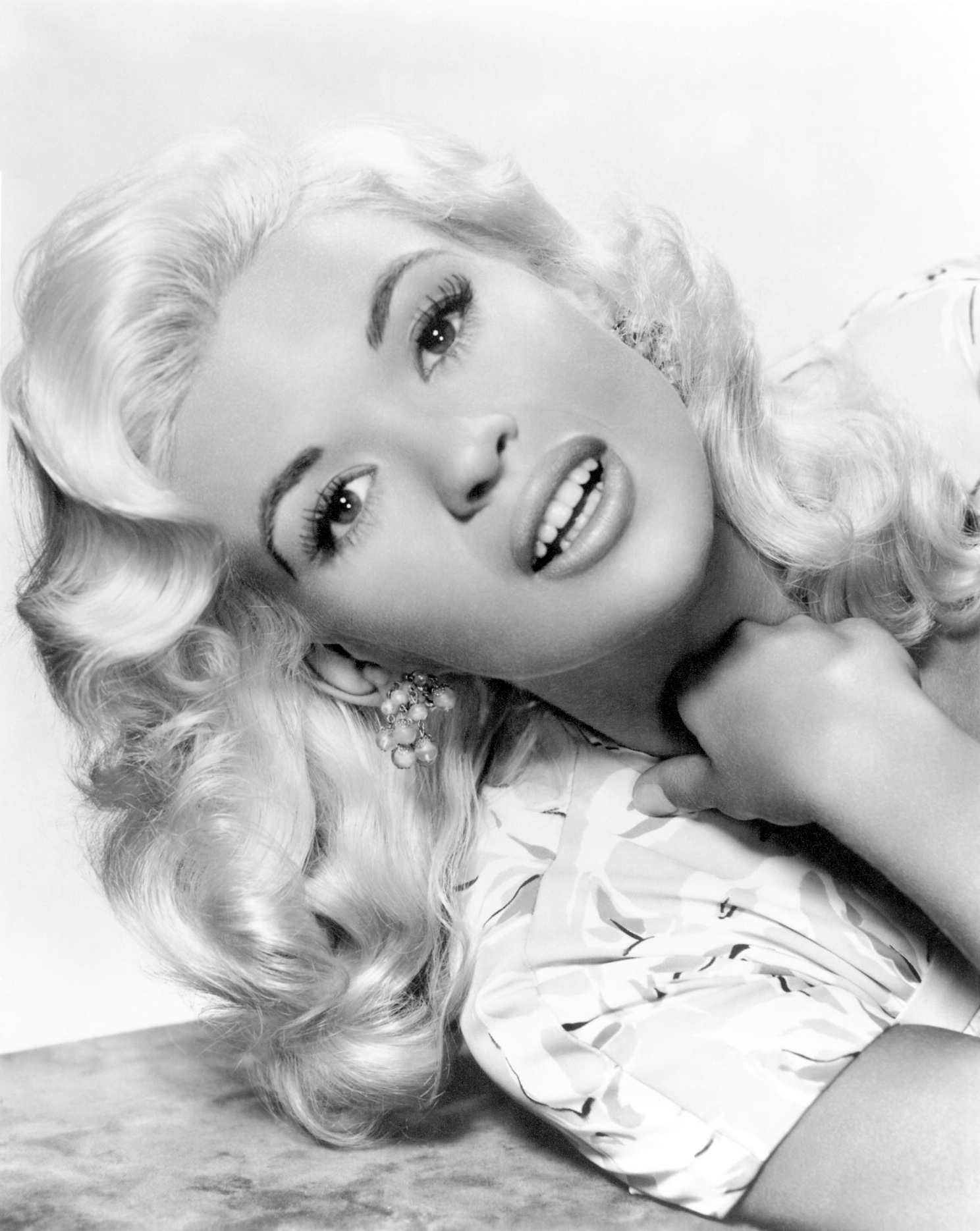
Jayne Mansfield

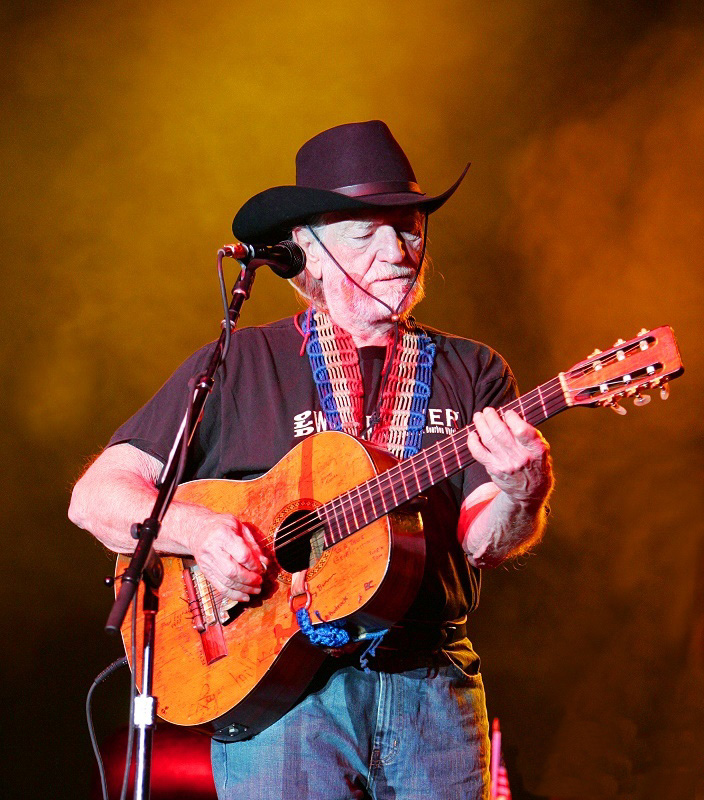
Willie Nelson

- April 1
  - Dan Flavin, American artist (d. 1996)
  - Claude Cohen-Tannoudji, French physicist and Nobel laureate (d. 2026)
- April 5 – Frank Gorshin, American actor (Batman) (d. 2005)
- April 6 – Henryk Niedźwiedzki, Polish boxer (d. 2018)
- April 7 – Wayne Rogers, American actor (M*A*S*H) (d. 2015)
- April 9
  - Jean-Paul Belmondo, French actor (d. 2021)
  - Gian Maria Volonté, Italian actor (d. 1994)
- April 12
  - Montserrat Caballé, Catalan operatic soprano (d. 2018)
  - Ben Nighthorse Campbell, American politician (d. 2025)
- April 14 – Yuri Oganessian, Russian nuclear physicist
- April 15
  - Roy Clark, American country musician (d. 2018)
  - Elizabeth Montgomery, American actress (Bewitched) (d. 1995)
- April 19 – Jayne Mansfield, American actress (d. 1967)
- April 25 – Jerry Leiber, American composer (d. 2011)
- April 26
  - Carol Burnett, American actress, singer and comedian
  - Arno Allan Penzias, German-born physicist and Nobel laureate (d. 2024)
- April 29
  - Mark Eyskens, Prime Minister of Belgium
  - Rod McKuen, American singer, songwriter and poet (d. 2015)
  - Willie Nelson, American singer, songwriter, musician, actor, producer, author, poet and activist
- April 30 – Vittorio Merloni, Italian entrepreneur (d. 2016)

=== May ===
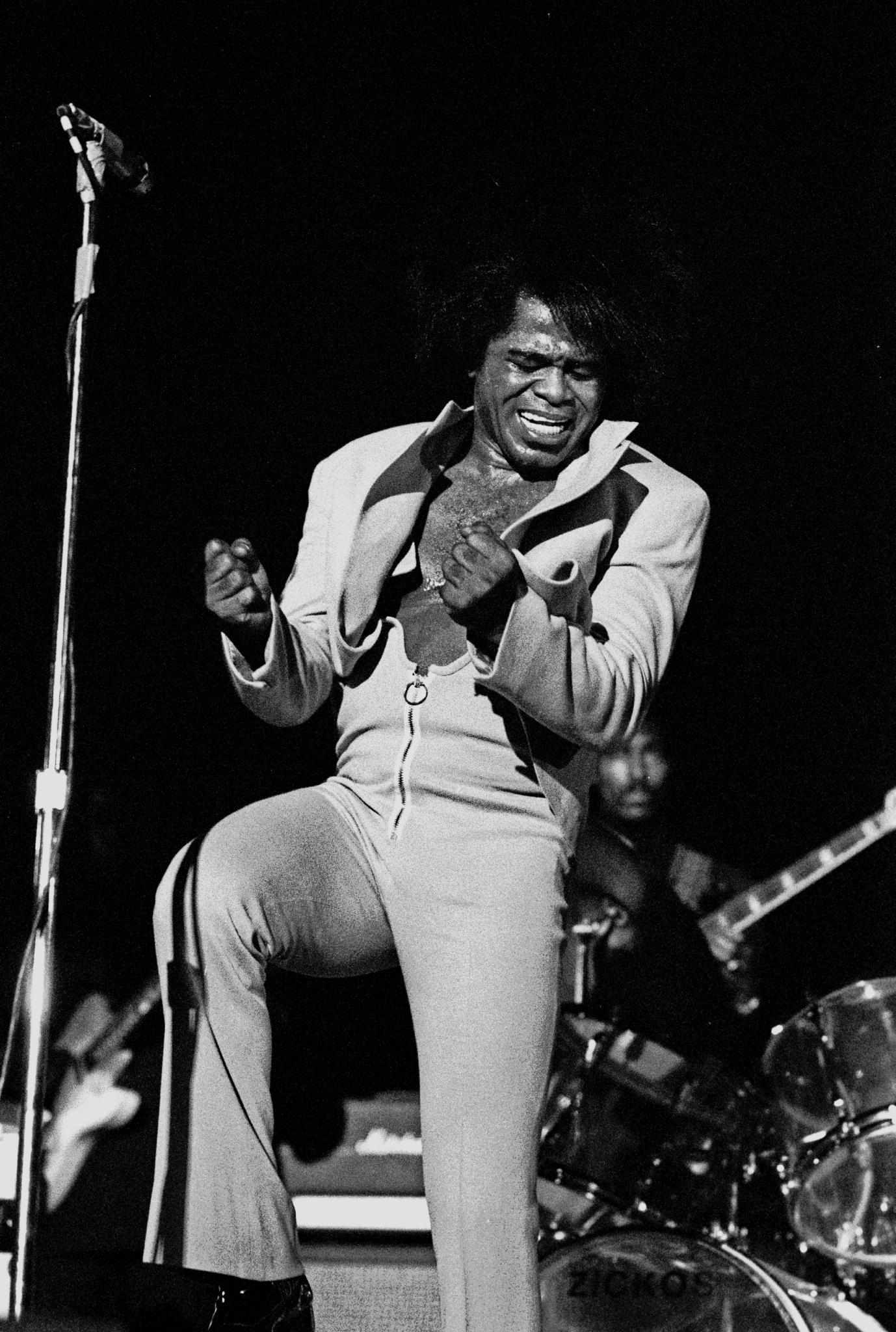
James Brown

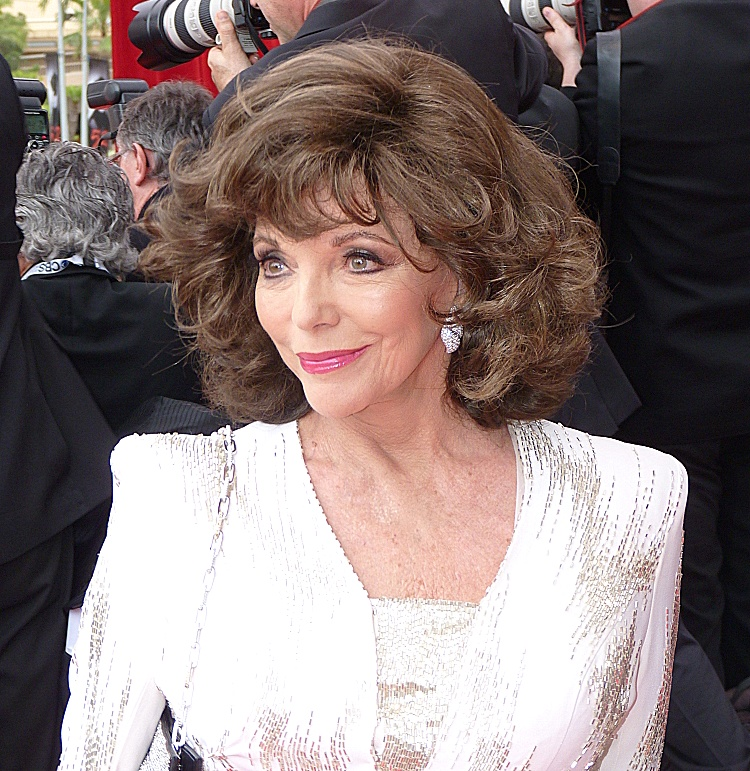
Joan Collins

- May 3
  - James Brown, African-American soul musician (d. 2006)
  - Steven Weinberg, American physicist and Nobel laureate (d. 2021)
- May 5 – Ratnasiri Wickremanayake, twice prime minister of Sri Lanka (d. 2016)
- May 7
  - Johnny Unitas, American football player (d. 2002)
  - Nexhmije Pagarusha, Albanian singer and actress (d. 2020)
- May 10
  - Barbara Taylor Bradford, English-born novelist (d. 2024)
  - Eurico da Silva, Indian judge of the High Court of Bombay (d. 2025)
- May 11 – Louis Farrakhan, African-American Muslim leader
- May 14 – Siân Phillips, Welsh actress
- May 21 – Maurice André, French trumpeter (d. 2012)
- May 22 – Chen Jingrun, Chinese mathematician (d. 1996)
- May 23 – Joan Collins, English actress
- May 29 – Helmuth Rilling, German conductor (d. 2026)

=== June ===
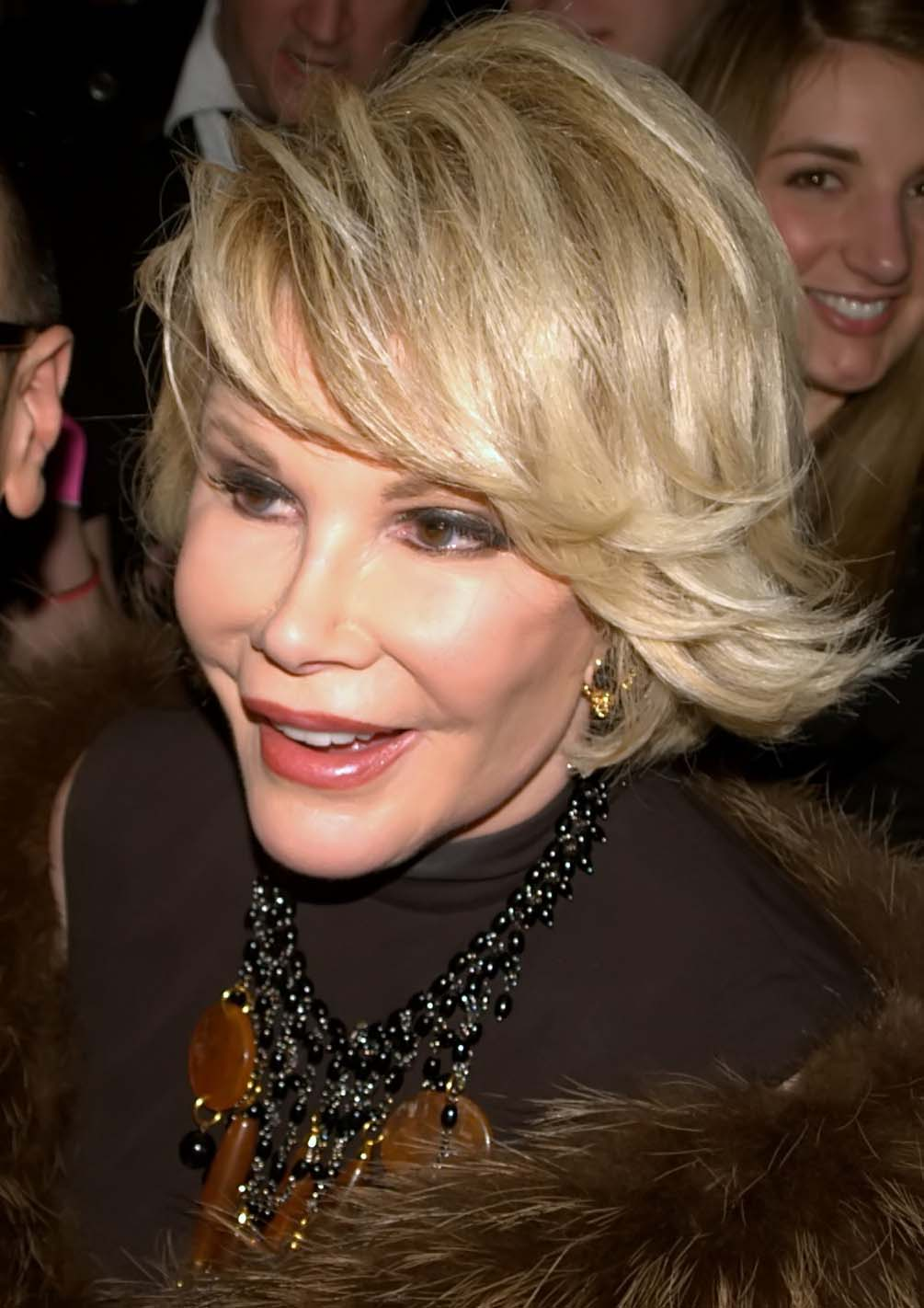
Joan Rivers

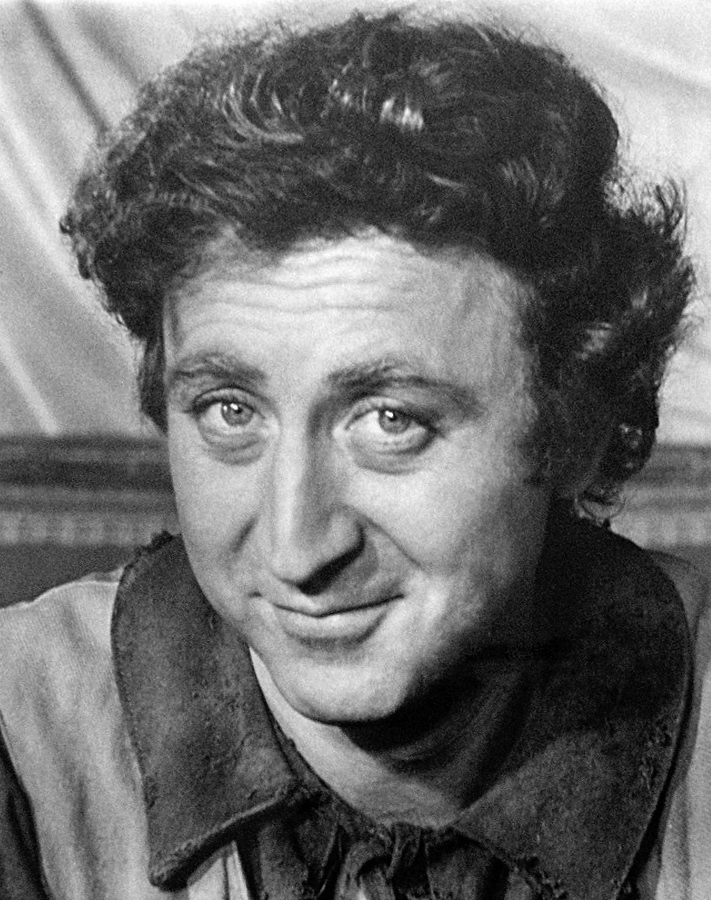
Gene Wilder

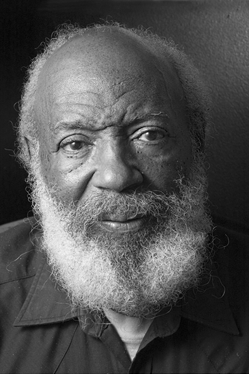
James Meredith

- June 1
  - Charlie Wilson, American politician (d. 2010)
  - Haruo Remeliik, 1st president of Palau (d. 1985)
- June 2 – Sasao Gouland, governor of Chuuk State, Micronesia (d. 2011)
- June 3 – Celso Torrelio, 58th president of Bolivia (d. 1999)
- June 4 – Godfried Danneels, Belgian cardinal (d. 2019)
- June 6 – Heinrich Rohrer, Swiss physicist, Nobel Prize laureate (d. 2013)
- June 8 – Joan Rivers, American actress, comedian, and television host (d. 2014)
- June 11 – Gene Wilder, American actor (d. 2016)
- June 12 – Eddie Adams, American photographer and photojournalist (d. 2004)
- June 13 – Sven-Olov Sjödelius, Swedish sprint canoeist (d. 2018)
- June 14 – Henri, Count of Paris, French noble (d. 2019)
- June 15 – Mohammad-Ali Rajai, 2nd president of Iran, 47th prime minister of Iran (d. 1981)
- June 17 – Maurice Stokes, American basketball player (d. 1970)
- June 19 – Viktor Patsayev, Russian cosmonaut (d. 1971)
- June 20 – Danny Aiello, American actor (d. 2019)
- June 22 – Dianne Feinstein, American politician, Senator and mayor of San Francisco (d. 2023)
- June 23 – Abel Alier, South Sudanese politician and judge
- June 24
  - Sam Jones, American basketball player (d. 2021)
  - Ngina Kenyatta, First Lady of Kenya
- June 25
  - James Meredith, American civil rights activist and writer
  - Hong Sook-ja, South Korean politician, feminist
  - Álvaro Siza Vieira, Portuguese architect
- June 26 – Claudio Abbado, Italian conductor (d. 2014)
- June 28 – V. Sasisekharan, Indian molecular biologist
- June 30 – Lea Massari, Italian actress (d. 2025)

=== July ===
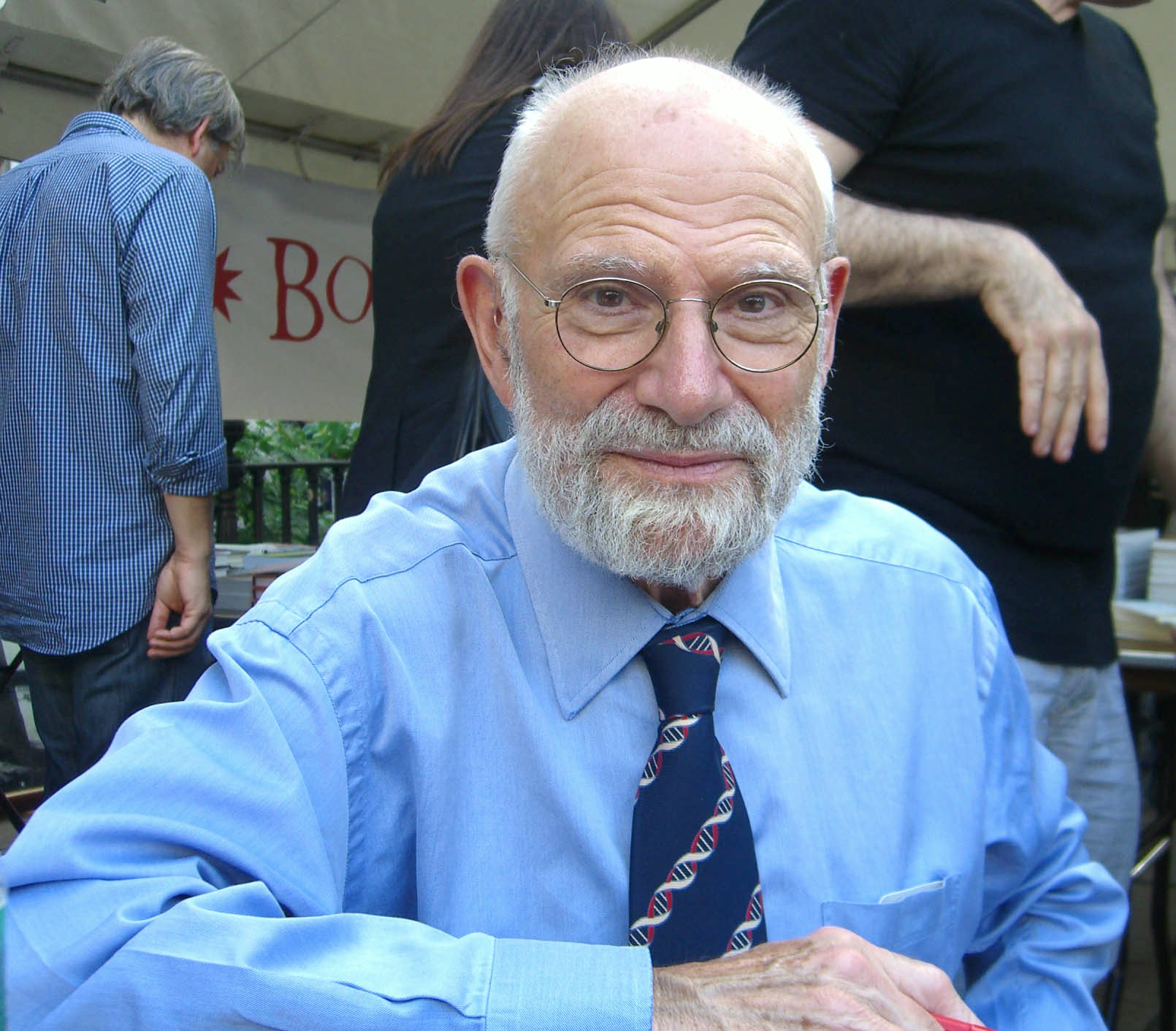
Oliver Sacks

- July 3
  - Carmen Barbará, Spanish comics artist, illustrator
  - Lidy Stoppelman, Dutch figure skater
- July 6 – Reza Davari Ardakani, Iranian philosopher
- July 7 – Murray Halberg, New Zealand runner (d. 2022)
- July 9 – Oliver Sacks, English-born neurologist (d. 2015)
- July 11
  - Joyce Piliso-Seroke, South-African educator, activist, feminist and community organizer
  - György Czakó, Hungarian figure skater (d. 2023)
- July 14
  - Franz von Bayern, German royal
  - Dumaagiin Sodnom, 13th prime minister of Mongolia
- July 15
  - Julian Bream, English guitarist and lutenist (d. 2020)
  - Guido Crepax, Italian comics artist (d. 2003)
  - John Hopfield, American physicist and Nobel Prize laureate
  - M. T. Vasudevan Nair, Indian writer (d. 2024)
- July 17 – Karmenu Mifsud Bonnici, 9th prime minister of Malta (d. 2022)
- July 18
  - Syd Mead, American industrial and conceptual designer (d. 2019)
  - Jean Yanne, French humorist and film actor and director (d. 2003)
  - Yevgeny Yevtushenko, Russian poet (d. 2017)
- July 19 – Michel Lévêque, French diplomat and politician
- July 20 – Cormac McCarthy, American Pulitzer Prize-winning author (d. 2023)
- July 23 – Richard Rogers, Italian-born British architect (d. 2021)
- July 29
  - Lou Albano, Italian-American professional wrestler, manager and actor (d. 2009)
  - Robert Fuller, American actor and rancher

=== August ===
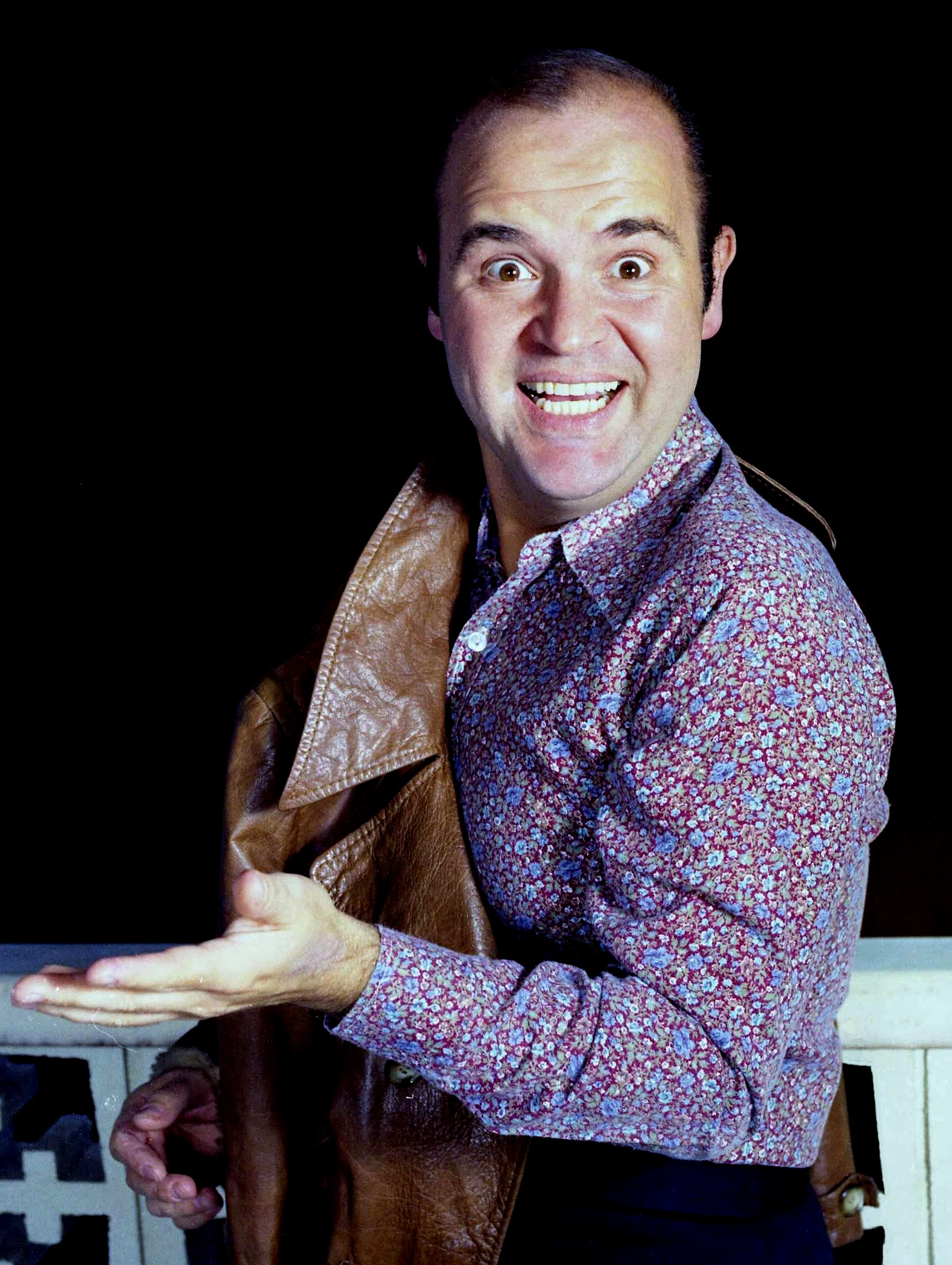
Dom DeLuise

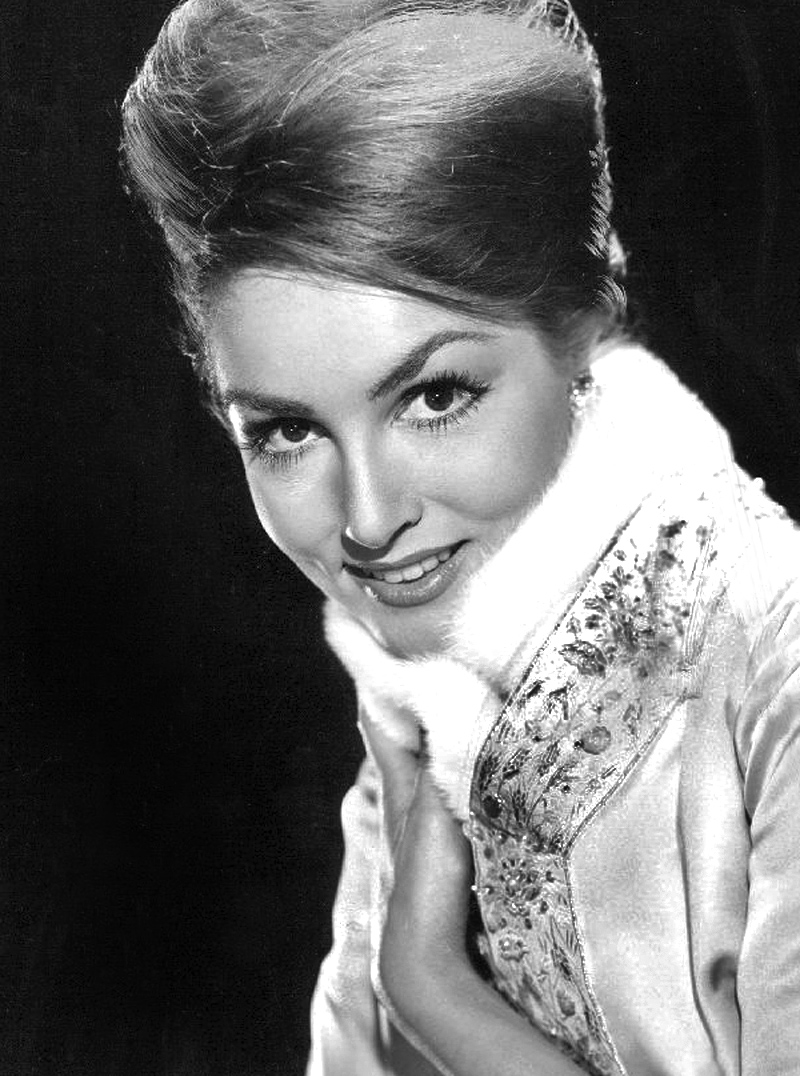
Julie Newmar

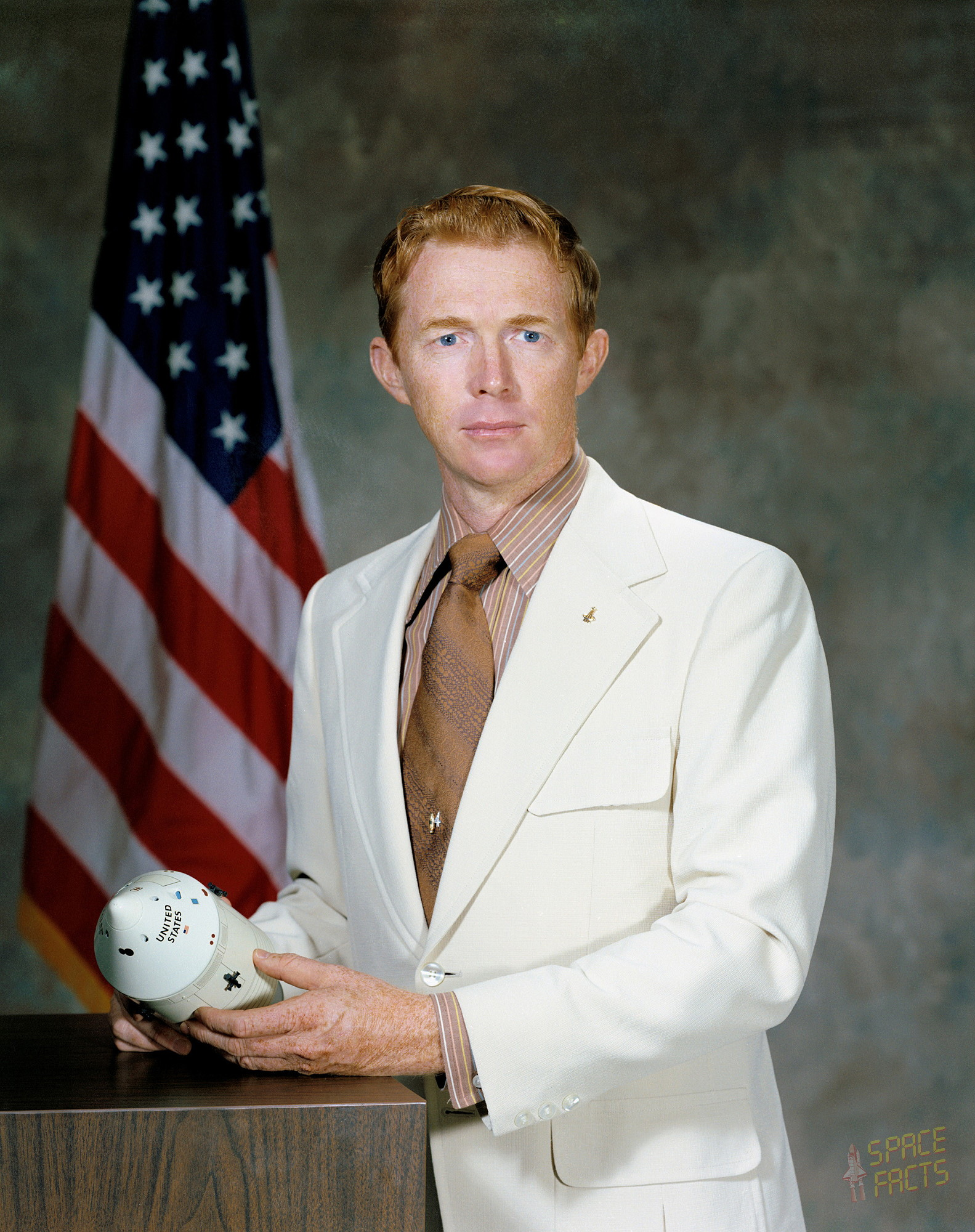
Stuart Roosa

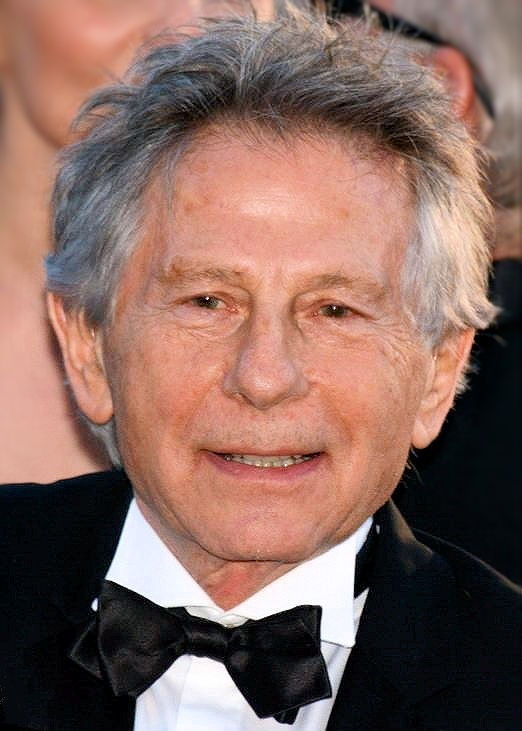
Roman Polanski

- August 1 – Dom DeLuise, American actor, comedian (d. 2009)
- August 2 – Tom Bell, English actor (d. 2006)
- August 6 – Suchinda Kraprayoon, 19th Prime Minister of Thailand (d. 2025)
- August 7
  - Elinor Ostrom, American economist, academic and Nobel Prize laureate (d. 2012)
  - Jerry Pournelle, American science fiction writer (d. 2017)
- August 10
  - Silvia Caos, Cuban-Mexican actress (d. 2006)
  - Doyle Brunson, American poker player (d. 2023)
- August 11 – Jerry Falwell, American evangelist, conservative political activist (d. 2007)
- August 14 – Richard R. Ernst, Swiss chemist, Nobel Prize laureate (d. 2021)
- August 16
  - Julie Newmar, American actress
  - Stuart Roosa, American astronaut (d. 1994)
  - Ricardo Blume, Peruvian-Mexican actor and theater director (d. 2020)
- August 17 – Gene Kranz, American NASA Flight Director
- August 18 – Roman Polanski, Polish film director
- August 20 – George J. Mitchell, American lawyer, businessman, author and politician
- August 21
  - Dame Janet Baker, English mezzo-soprano
  - Ethel Moustacchi, Egyptian-born French geneticist, researcher in molecular biology and radiobiology (d. 2016)
- August 23 – Robert Curl, American chemist, Nobel Prize laureate (d. 2022)
- August 24 – Guillermo Bredeston, Argentine actor (d. 2018)
- August 25 – Tom Skerritt, American actor (d. 2026)
- August 29 – Arnold Koller, Swiss Federal Councillor

=== September ===
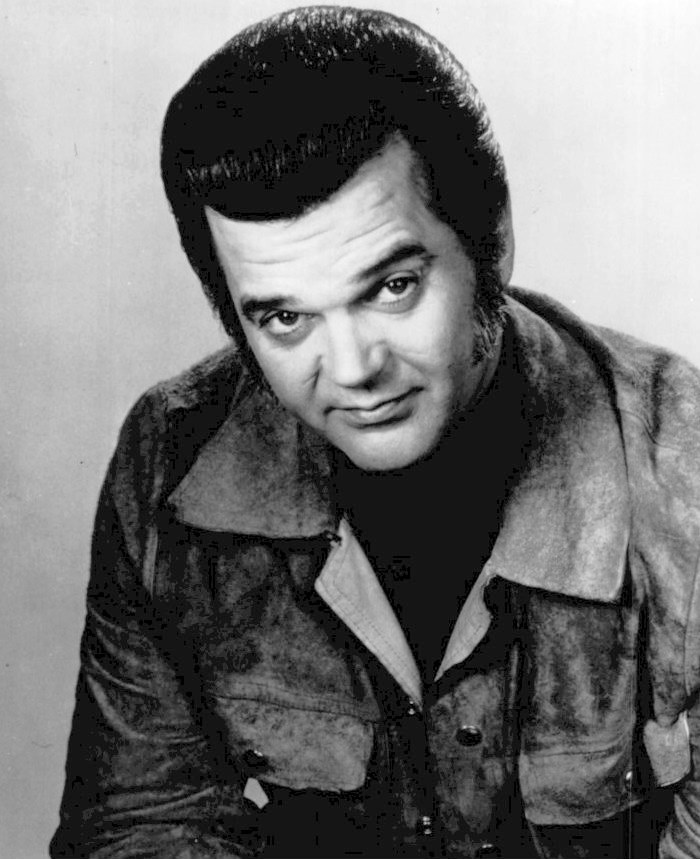
Conway Twitty

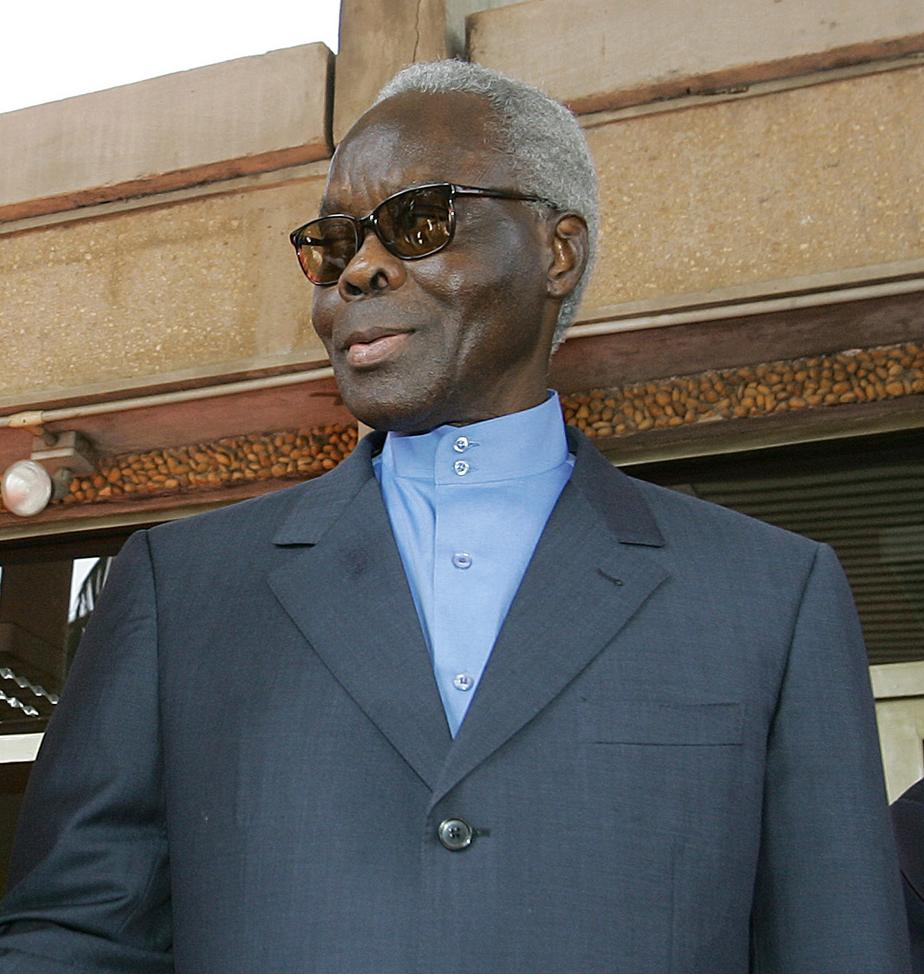
Mathieu Kérékou

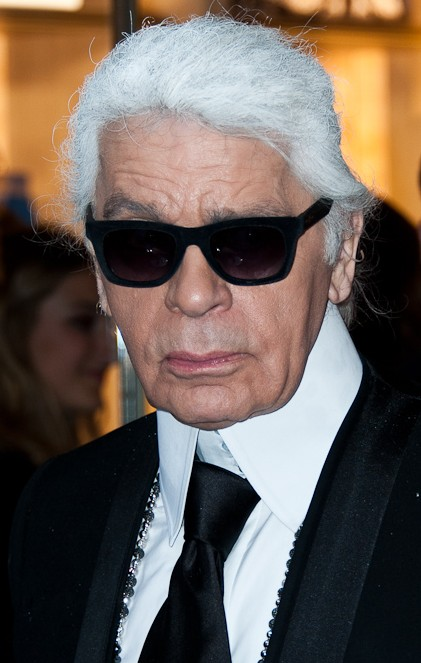
Karl Lagerfeld

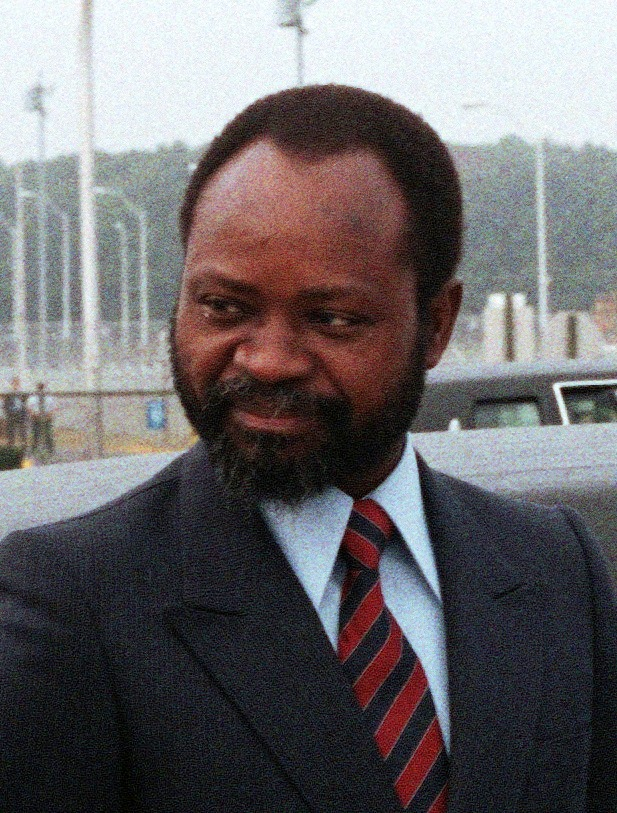
Samora Machel

- September 1
  - T. Thirunavukarasu, Sri Lankan Tamil politician (d. 1982)
  - Conway Twitty, American country music artist (d. 1993)
- September 2 – Mathieu Kérékou, 5th President of Benin (d. 2015)
- September 10
  - Yevgeny Khrunov, Russian cosmonaut (d. 2000)
  - Karl Lagerfeld, German fashion designer, artist (d. 2019)
- September 11 – William Luther Pierce, American Neo-Nazi and far-right activist (d. 2002)
- September 13 – Mahant Swami Maharaj (b. Vinu Patel), Indian Hindu guru
- September 14 – Hillevi Rombin, Swedish athlete, model and Miss Universe 1955 (d. 1996)
- September 15 – Rafael Frühbeck de Burgos, Spanish conductor (d. 2014)
- September 17
  - Arsenio Corsellas, Spanish actor (d. 2019)
  - Chuck Grassley, American politician
  - Evelyn Kawamoto, American competition swimmer (d. 2017)
  - Dorothy Loudon, American actress and singer (d. 2003)
- September 18
  - Scotty Bowman, Canadian ice hockey coach
  - Robert Blake, American actor (d. 2023)
  - Fred Willard, American actor and comedian (d. 2020)
- September 19 – David McCallum, Scottish-born actor (d. 2023)
- September 24 – Raffaele Farina, Italian cardinal, archivist of the Holy Roman Church
- September 25 – Hubie Brown, American basketball coach, broadcaster
- September 27
  - Kathleen Nolan, American actress
  - Will Sampson, American actor (d. 1987)
- September 29 – Samora Machel, President of Mozambique (d. 1986)
- September 30
  - Ajitesh Bandopadhyay, Indian actor, playwright and director (d. 1983)
  - Cissy Houston, American singer (d. 2024)
  - Barbara Knox, English actress
  - Dirce Migliaccio, Brazilian actress (d. 2009)
  - Michael Parenti, American political scientist (d. 2026)

=== October ===
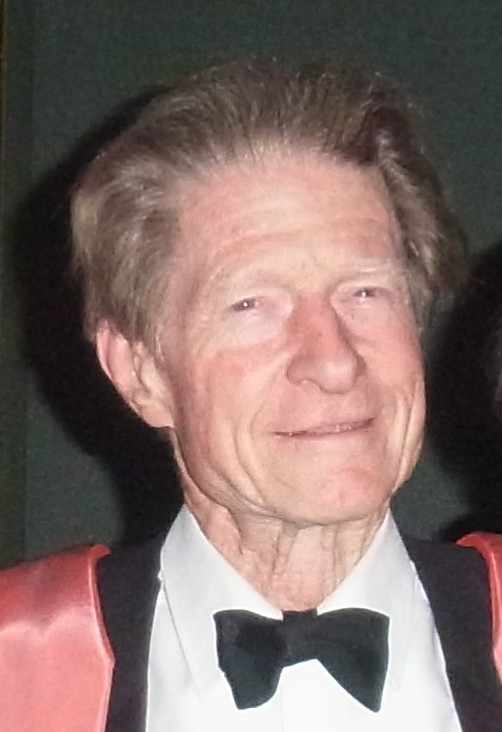
John Gurdon

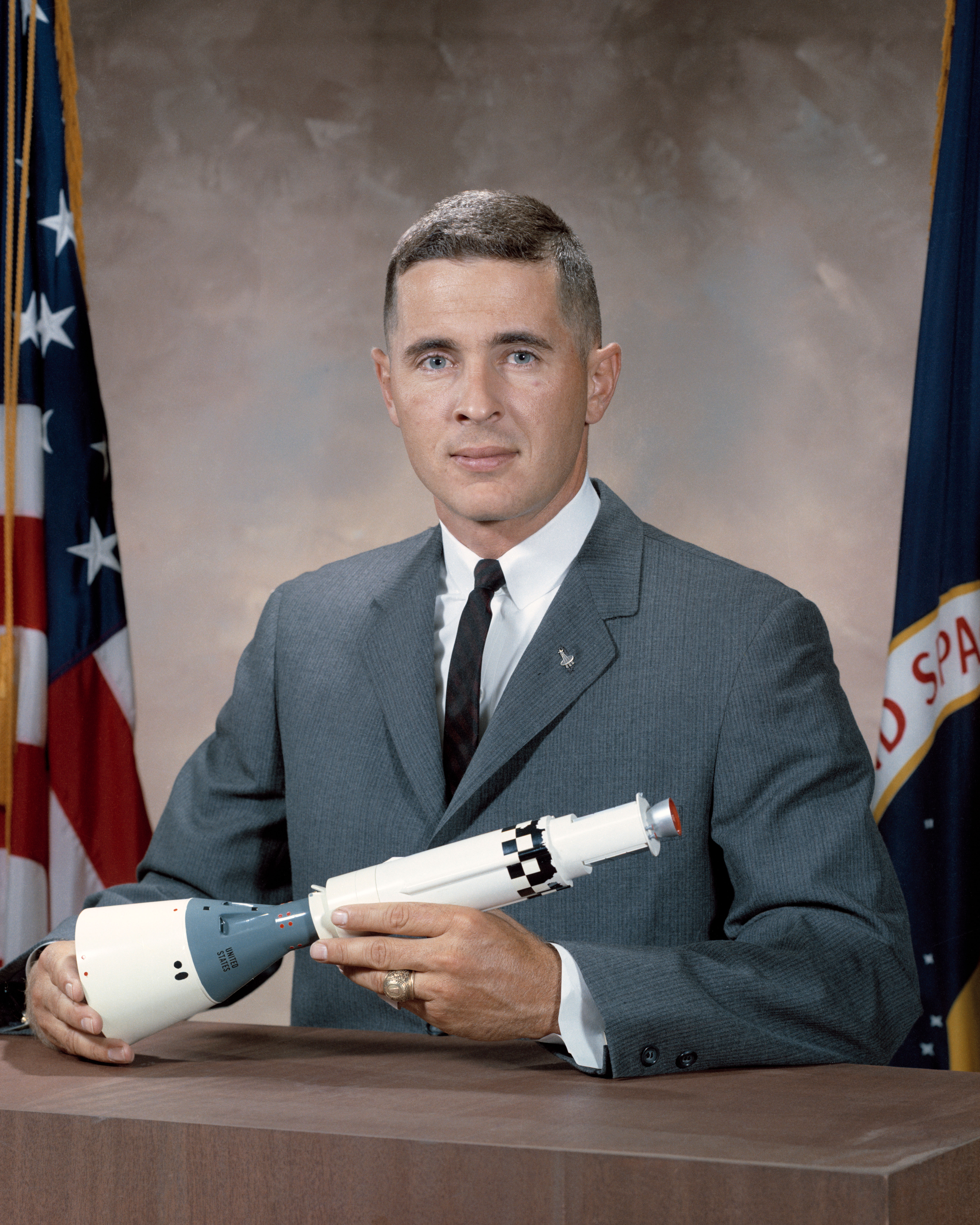
William Anders

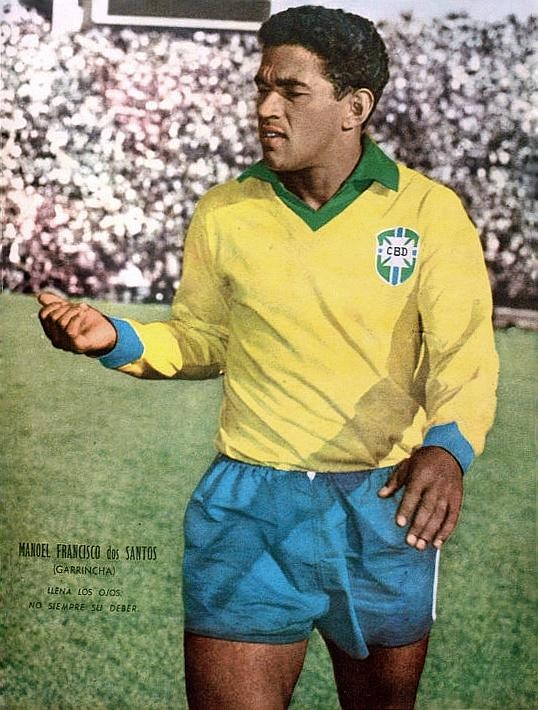
Garrincha

- October 2
  - John Gurdon, British developmental biologist, recipient of the Nobel Prize in Physiology or Medicine (d. 2025)
  - Waldo Von Erich, Canadian professional wrestler (d. 2009)
- October 3 – Abdon Pamich, Italian Olympic athlete
- October 9 – Peter Mansfield, British physicist and Nobel laureate (d. 2017)
- October 10 – Jay Sebring, American hair stylist (d. 1969)
- October 13 – Mark Zakharov, Soviet and Russian film and theatre director (d. 2019)
- October 17
  - William Anders, American astronaut (d. 2024)
  - Jeanine Deckers, Belgian nun, known as "The Singing Nun" (d. 1985)
- October 18 – Firuz Mustafayev, Azerbaijani politician (d. 2018)
- October 19 – Dom Geraldo Majella, Brazilian Roman Catholic Cardinal (d. 2023)
- October 24
  - Reginald Kray, British gangster (d. 2000)
  - Ronald Kray, British gangster (d. 1995)
- October 28 – Garrincha, Brazilian footballer (d. 1983)

=== November ===
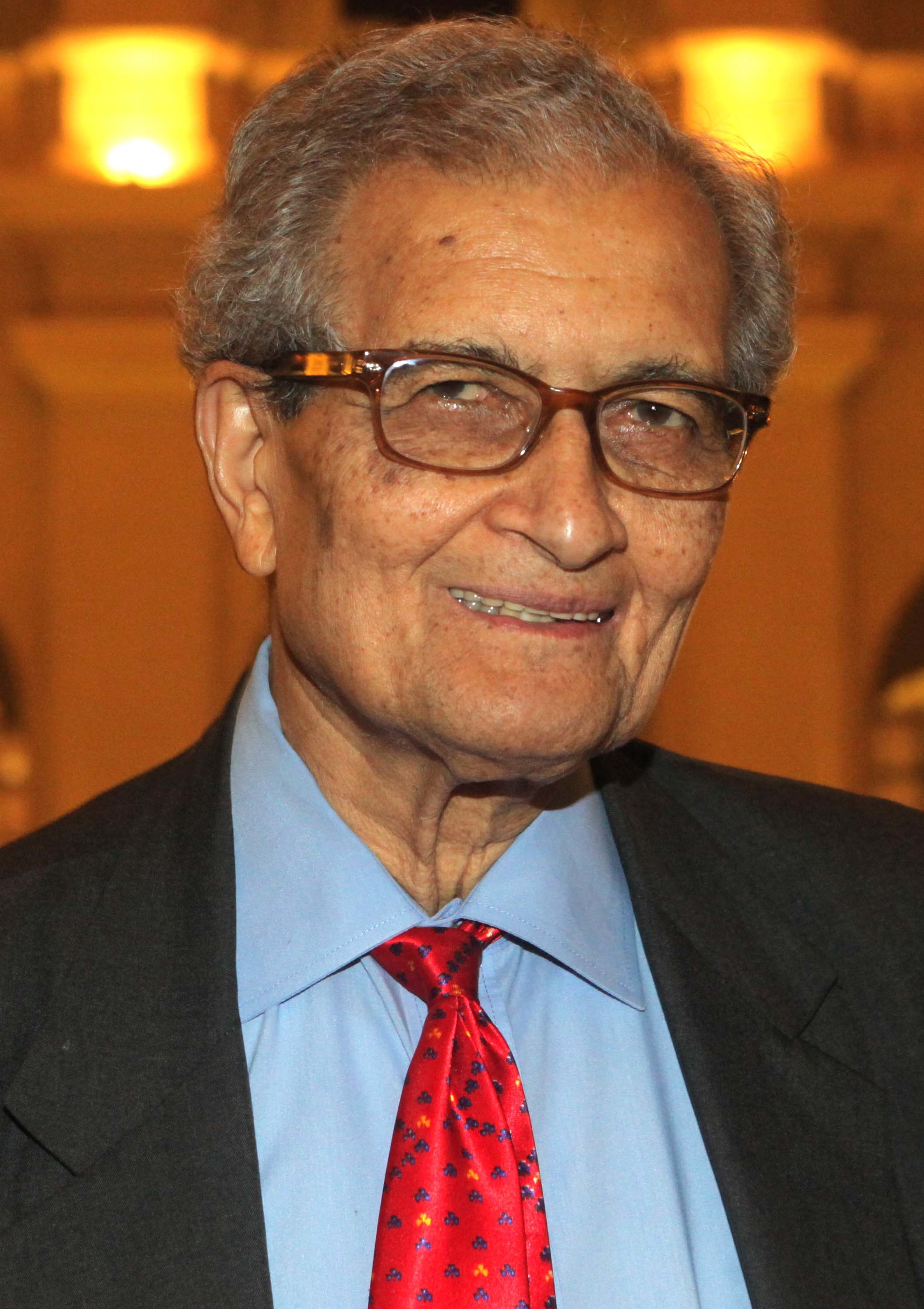
Amartya Sen

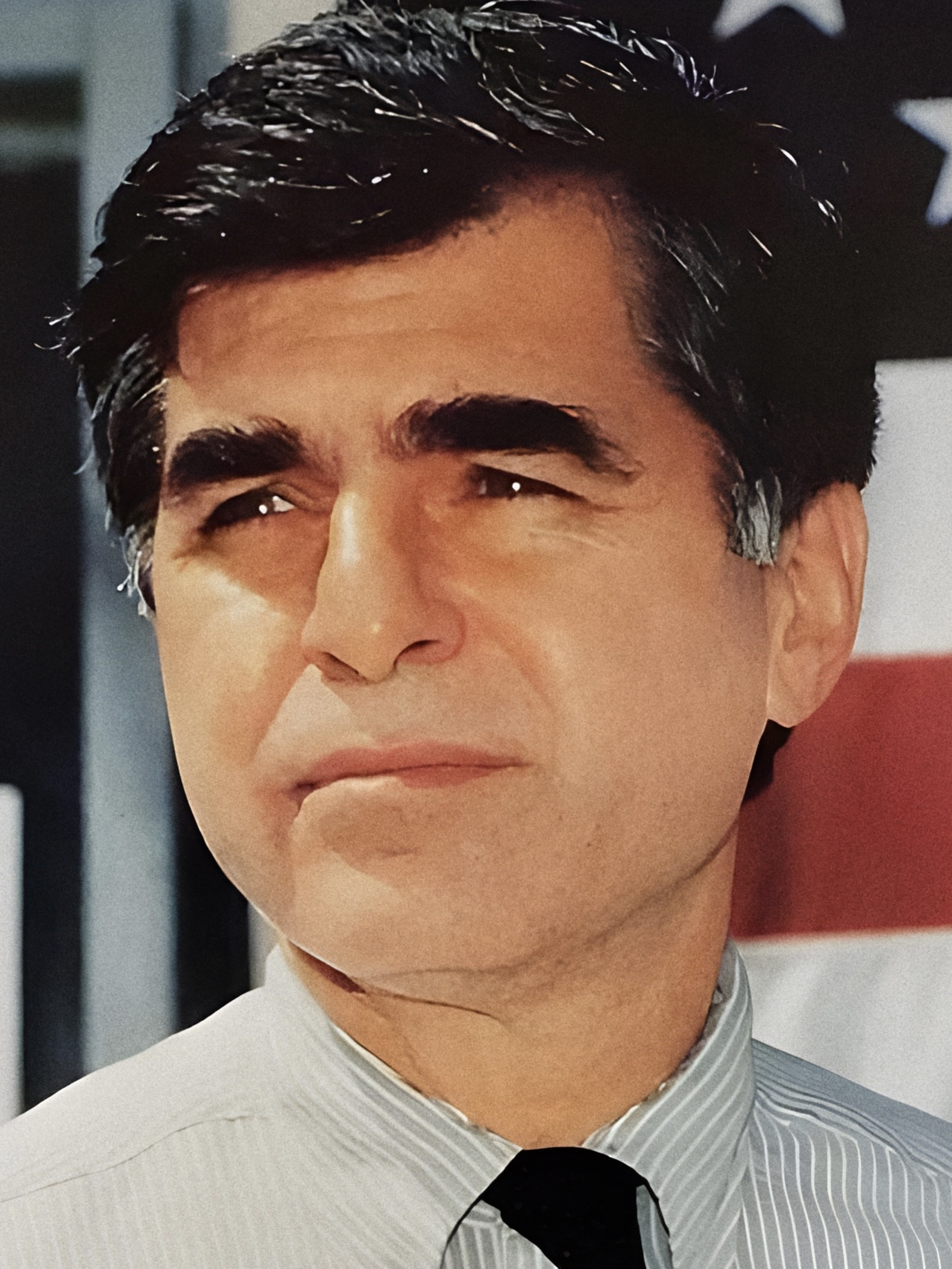
Michael Dukakis

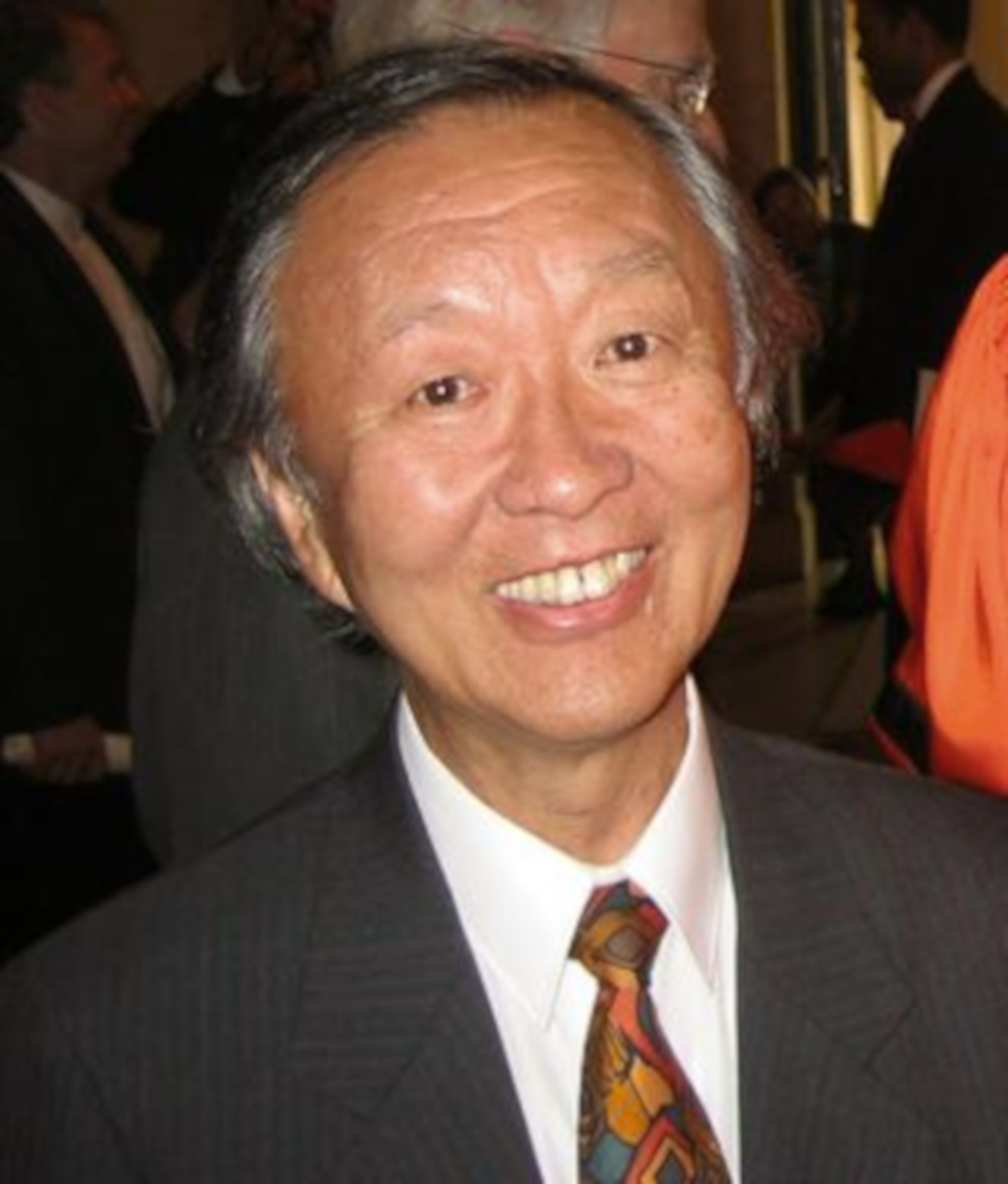
Charles K. Kao

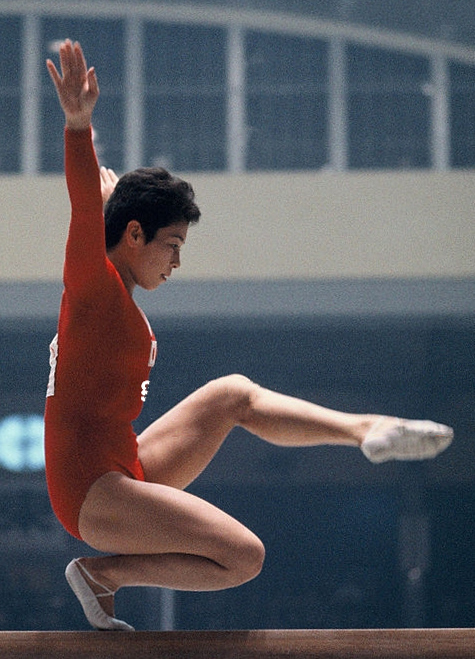
Keiko Tanaka-Ikeda

- November 3
  - John Barry, British film score composer (d. 2011)
  - Ken Berry, American actor, dancer and singer (d. 2018)
  - Jeremy Brett, British actor (d. 1995)
  - Aneta Corsaut, American actress (d. 1995)
  - Amartya Sen, Indian economist, Nobel Prize laureate
  - C. K. Jaffer Sharief, Indian politician (d. 2018)
  - Michael Dukakis, American politician, former governor of Massachusetts, and 1988 presidential candidate
- November 4 – Charles K. Kao, Chinese electrical engineer, physicist and Nobel laureate (d. 2018)
- November 6 – Knut Johannesen, Norwegian speed-skater
- November 9 – Lucian Pintilie, Romanian film director, screenwriter (d. 2018)
- November 10
  - Don Clarke, New Zealand rugby football player (d. 2002)
  - Seymour Nurse, Barbadian cricketer (d. 2019)
- November 11 – Keiko Tanaka-Ikeda, Japanese artistic gymnast (d. 2023)
- November 12
  - Jalal Talabani, Kurdish President of Iraq (d. 2017)
  - Peter Davis (British director), documentary filmmaker (d. 2025)
- November 14 – Fred Haise, American astronaut in Apollo 13
- November 19 – Larry King, American Hall of Fame broadcaster (Larry King Live, Larry King Now, Politicking with Larry King) (d. 2021)
- November 21 – T. Rasalingam, Sri Lankan Tamil politician
- November 23 – Krzysztof Penderecki, Polish composer and conductor (d. 2020)
- November 25
  - Tunku Abdul Rahman, Malaysian aristocrat (d. 1988)
  - Kathryn Crosby, American actress (d. 2024)
- November 26 – Robert Goulet, American entertainer (d. 2007)
- November 27 – Ani Bitenc, Slovenian translator (d. 2024)
- November 28 – Hope Lange, American actress (d. 2003)
- November 29
  - Francisco Cuoco, Brazilian actor (d. 2025)
  - John Mayall, English blues musician (d. 2024)

=== December ===
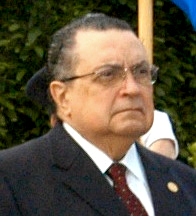
Abel Pacheco

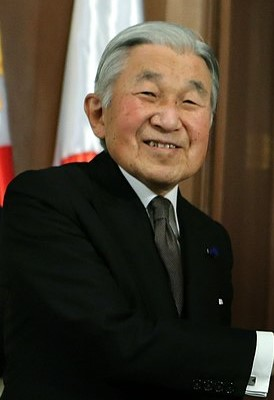
Emperor Akihito

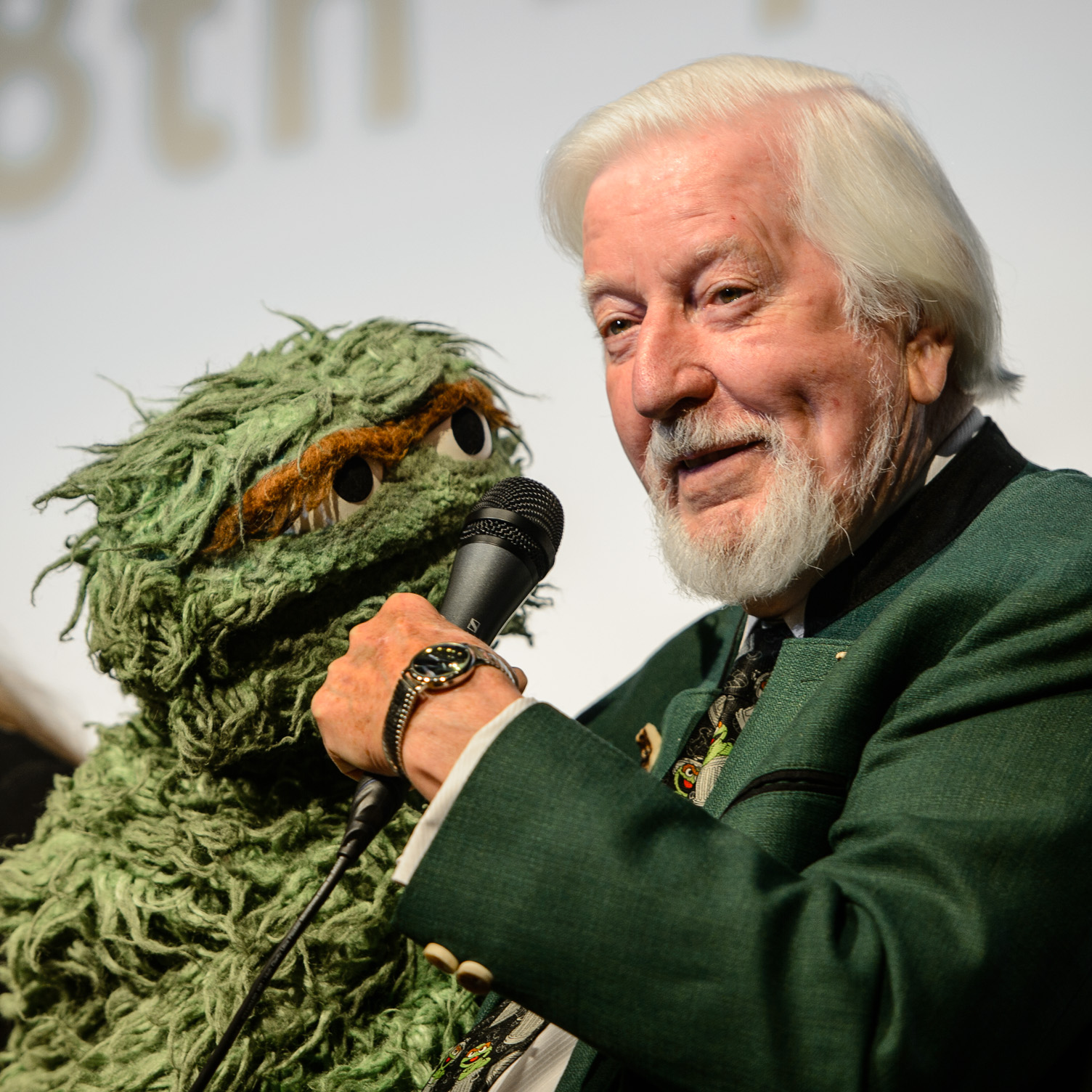
Caroll Spinney

- December 1 – Lou Rawls, American singer, songwriter, actor, voice actor and record producer (d. 2006)
- December 2 – Mike Larrabee, American Olympic athlete (d. 2003)
- December 3 – Paul J. Crutzen, Dutch chemist, Nobel Prize laureate (d. 2021)
- December 4
  - Tengku Ampuan Afzan, Queen of Malaysia (d. 1988)
  - Horst Buchholz, German actor (d. 2003)
  - Wink Martindale, American game show host and disc jockey (d. 2025)
- December 6 – Henryk Górecki, Polish composer (d. 2010)
- December 10 – Mako, Japanese-born actor (d. 2006)
- December 13 – Lou Adler, American film and record producer
- December 14
  - Justin Rakotoniaina, 3rd prime minister of Madagascar (d. 2001)
  - Eva Wilma, Brazilian actress (d. 2021)
- December 15
  - Tim Conway, American actor and comedian (d. 2019)
  - Ralph T. O'Neal, 4th and 6th Premier of the Virgin Islands (d. 2019)
- December 17 – Shirley Abrahamson, American jurist, Chief Justice of the Wisconsin Supreme Court (d. 2020)
- December 22
  - Abel Pacheco, 44th President of Costa Rica
  - John Bowab, American theater and television director
- December 23 – Akihito, 125th Emperor of Japan
- December 25 – Phan Văn Khải, 5th Prime Minister of Vietnam (d. 2018)
- December 26
  - Emmanuel Dabbaghian, Syrian Armenian Catholic patriarch (d. 2018)
  - Caroll Spinney, American puppeteer (d. 2019)

== Deaths ==
=== January ===
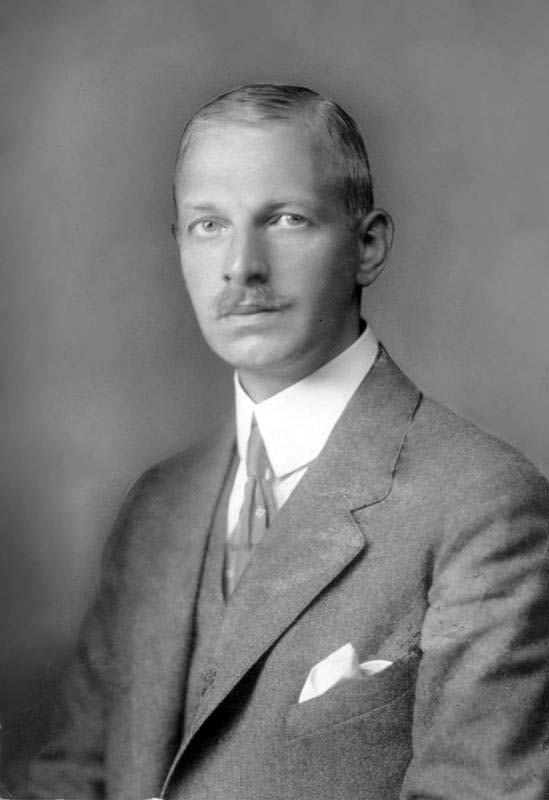
Wilhelm Cuno

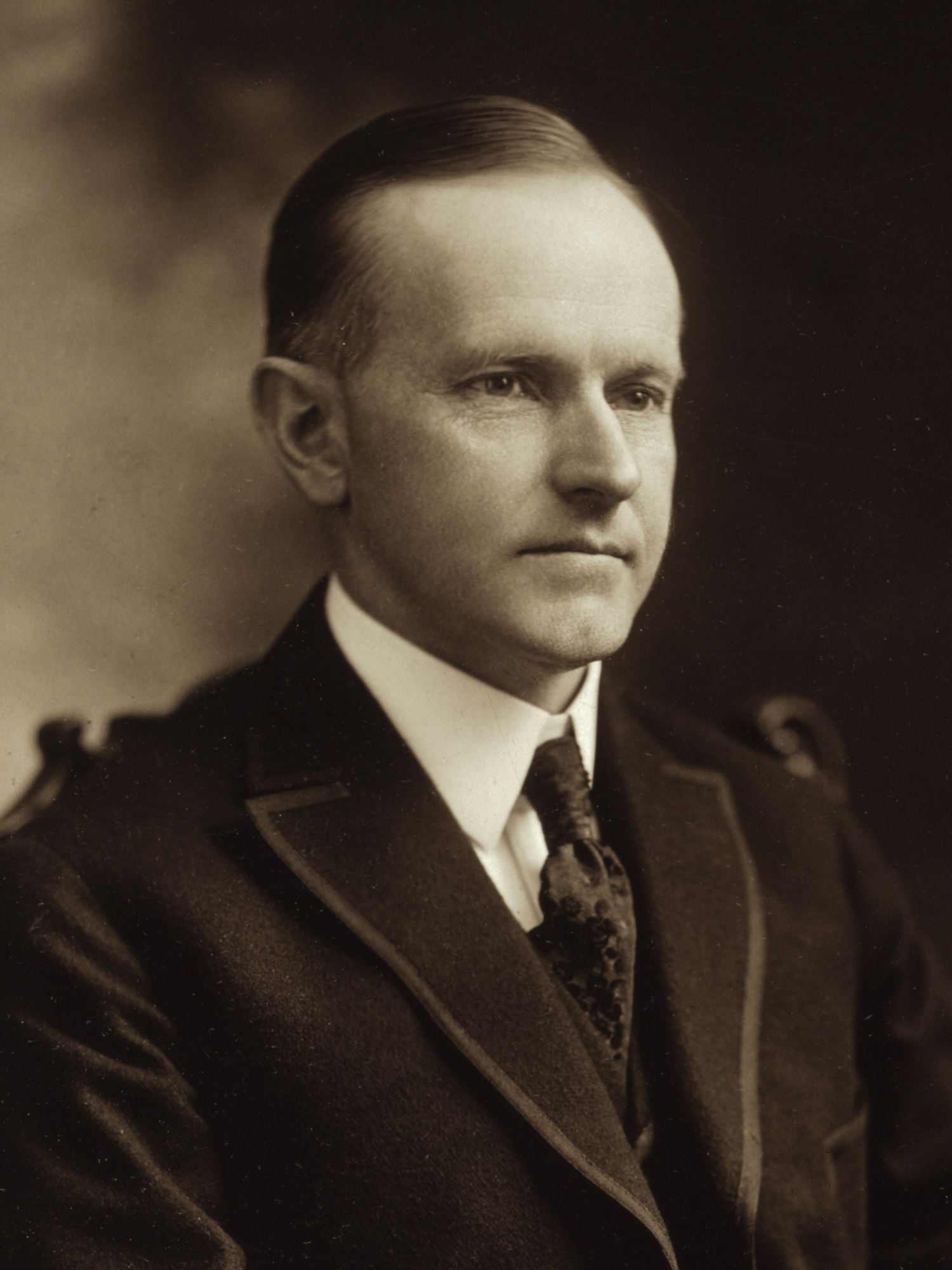
Calvin Coolidge

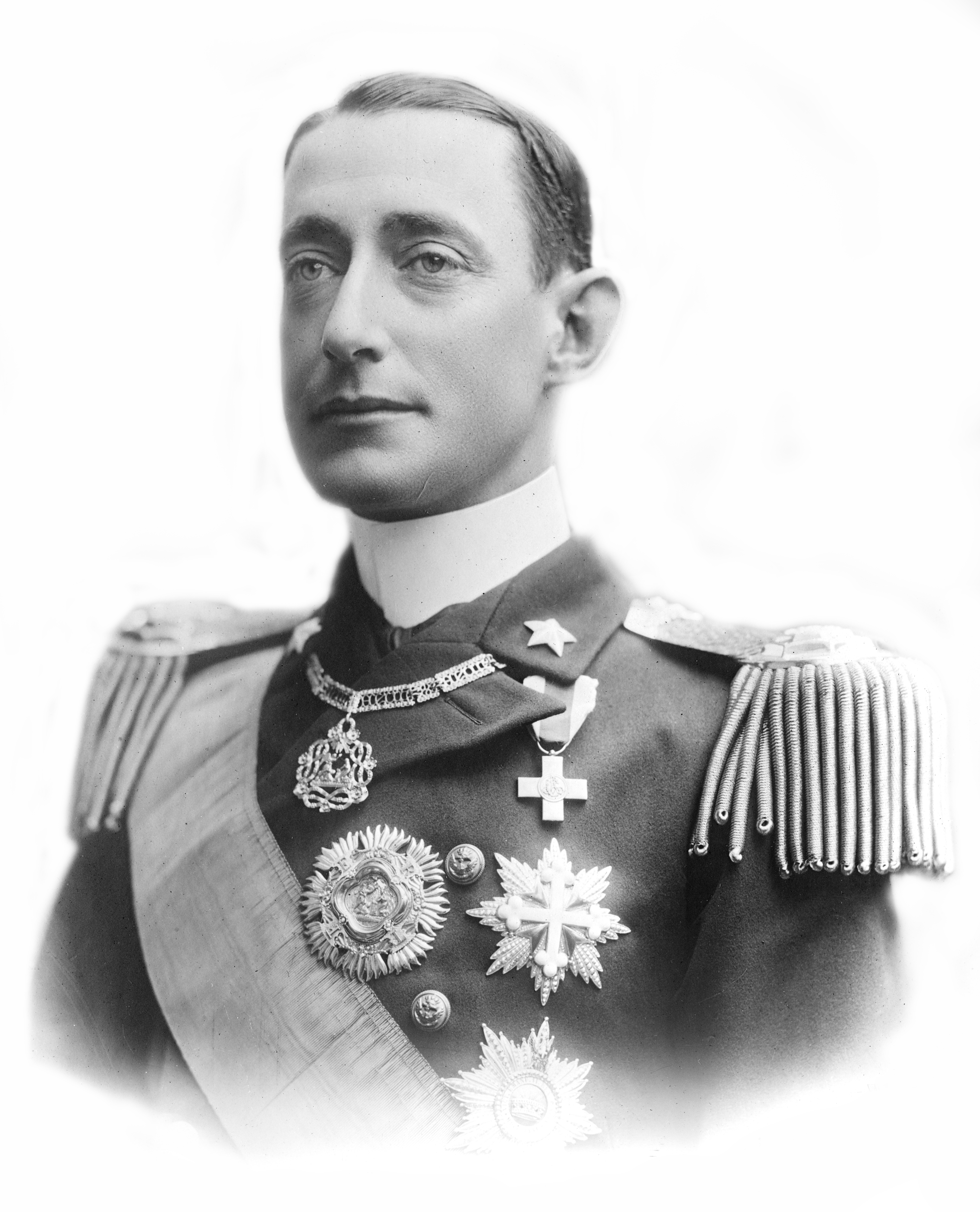
Prince Luigi Amedeo, Duke of the Abruzzi

- January 3
  - Wilhelm Cuno, German businessman, politician and 15th Chancellor of Germany (b. 1876)
  - Jack Pickford, Canadian-born actor, film director and producer (b. 1896)
- January 5 – Calvin Coolidge, 30th President of the United States (b. 1872)
- January 7 – Bert Hinkler, Australian aviator (b. 1892)
- January 9
  - Kate Gleason, American engineer (b. 1865)
  - Daphne Akhurst, Australian tennis champion (b. 1903)
- January 10 – Roberto Mantovani, Italian geologist (b. 1854)
- January 17 – Louis Comfort Tiffany, American stained glass artist, jewellery designer, son of Charles Lewis Tiffany (b. 1848)
- January 25 – Lewis J. Selznick, American film producer (b. 1870)
- January 29
  - Thomas Coward, British ornithologist (b. 1867)
  - Sara Teasdale, American lyrical poet (b. 1884)
- January 31 – John Galsworthy, British writer, Nobel Prize laureate (b. 1867)

=== February ===
- February 5
  - James Banning, American aviation pioneer (b. 1900)
  - Josiah Thomas, Australian politician (b. 1863)
- February 12
  - Henri Duparc, French composer (b. 1848)
  - Sir William Robertson, British field marshal (b. 1860)
- February 14 – Carl Correns, German botanist, geneticist (b. 1864)
- February 15 – Pat Sullivan, Australian-born American director, producer of animated films (b. 1885)
- February 18 – James J. Corbett, American boxer (b. 1866)
- February 26
  - Spottiswoode Aitken, British-American actor (b. 1868)
  - Grand Duke Alexander Mikhailovich of Russia (b. 1866)
- February 27 – Walter Hiers, American actor (b. 1893)

=== March ===
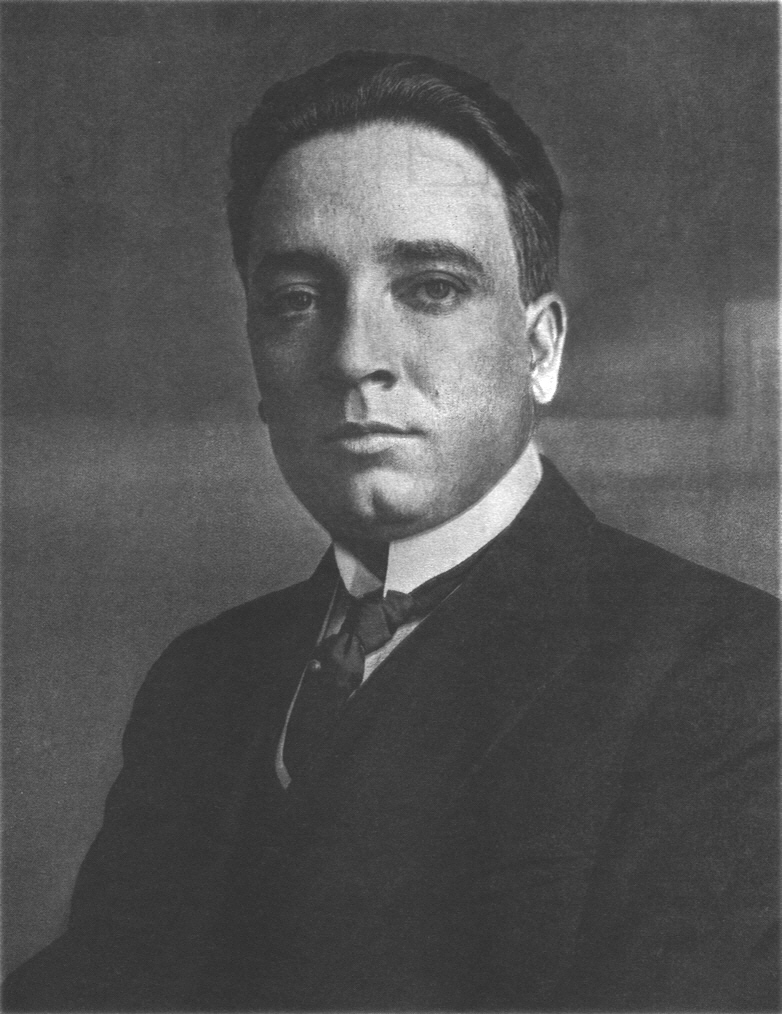
Baltasar Brum

- March 2 – Thomas J. Walsh, American politician (b. 1859)
- March 6
  - Anton Cermak, Mayor of Chicago, Illinois (assassinated) (b. 1873)
  - Cyril R. Jandus, American lawyer and politician (b. 1867)
- March 10 – Ahmed Sharif as-Senussi, Chief of the Senussi order in Libya (b. 1873)
- March 13
  - Andon Dimitrov, Bulgarian revolutionary leader (b. 1867)
  - Robert T. A. Innes, South African astronomer (b. 1861)
- March 14
  - Balto, American sled dog (b. 1919)
  - Antonio Garbasso, Italian physicist, politician (b. 1871)
- March 15 – Gustavo Jiménez, Interim President of Peru (b. 1886)
- March 18 – Prince Luigi Amedeo, Duke of the Abruzzi, Italian mountaineer, explorer and admiral (b. 1873)
- March 19 – Erhard Heiden, German Nazi officer and 3rd commander Reichsführer-SS of the Schutzstaffel (b. 1901)
- March 20 – Giuseppe Zangara, American attempted assassin of Franklin D. Roosevelt (b. 1900)
- March 26 – Eddie Lang, American musician (b. 1902)
- March 30 – Dan O'Connor, Canadian prospector (b. 1864)
- March 31 – Baltasar Brum, 23rd President of Uruguay (b. 1883)

=== April ===
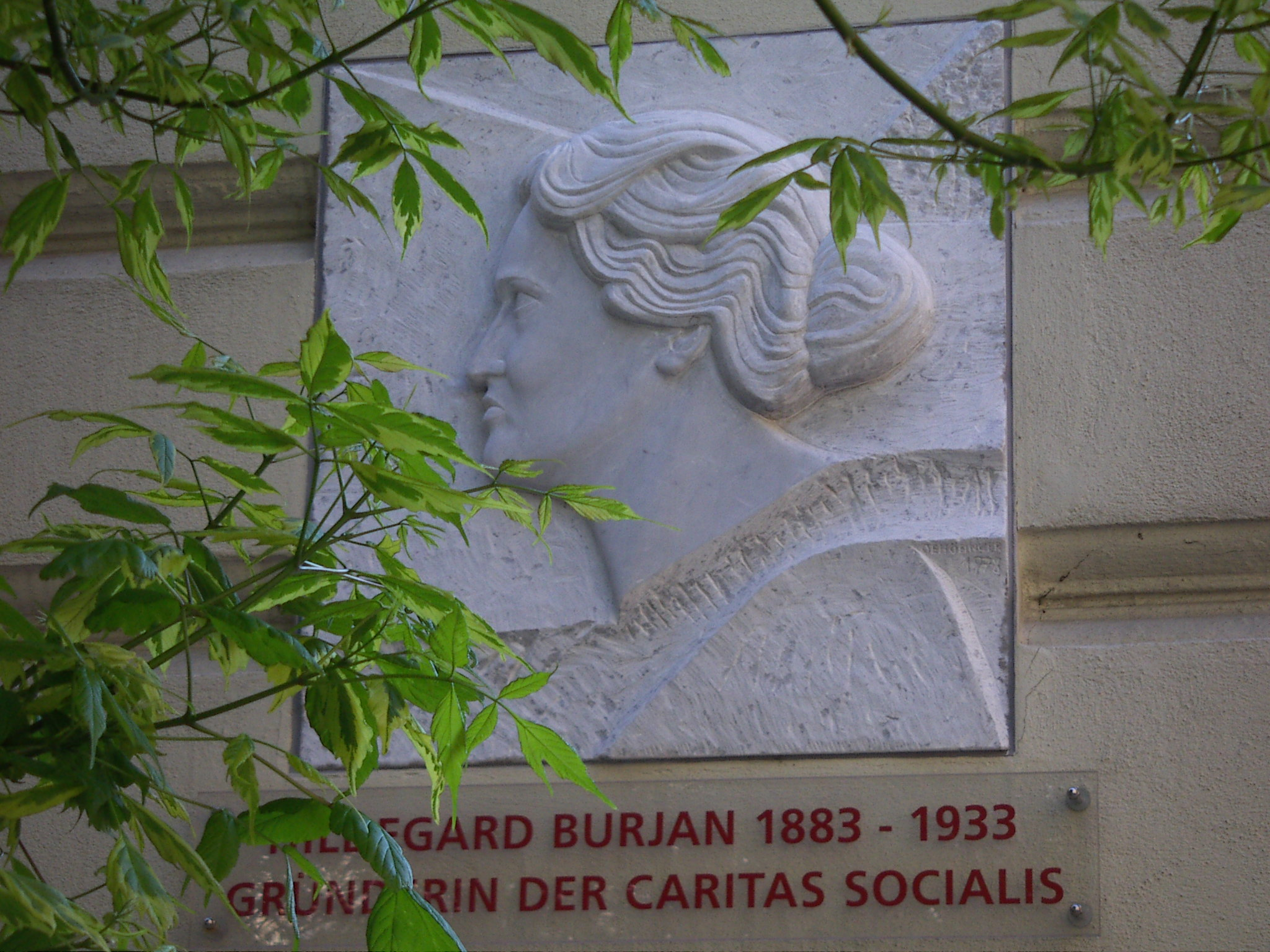
Blessed Hildegard Burjan

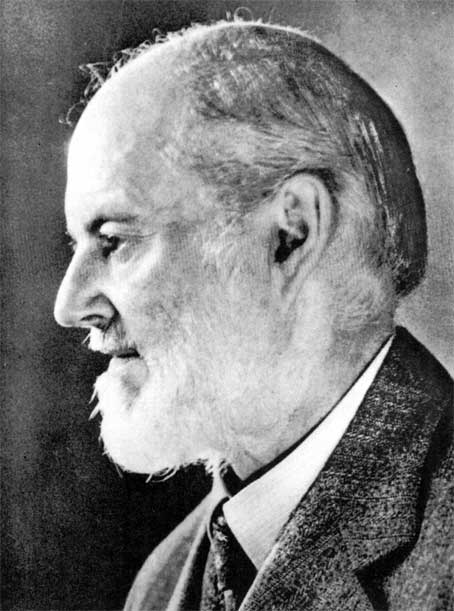
Henry Royce

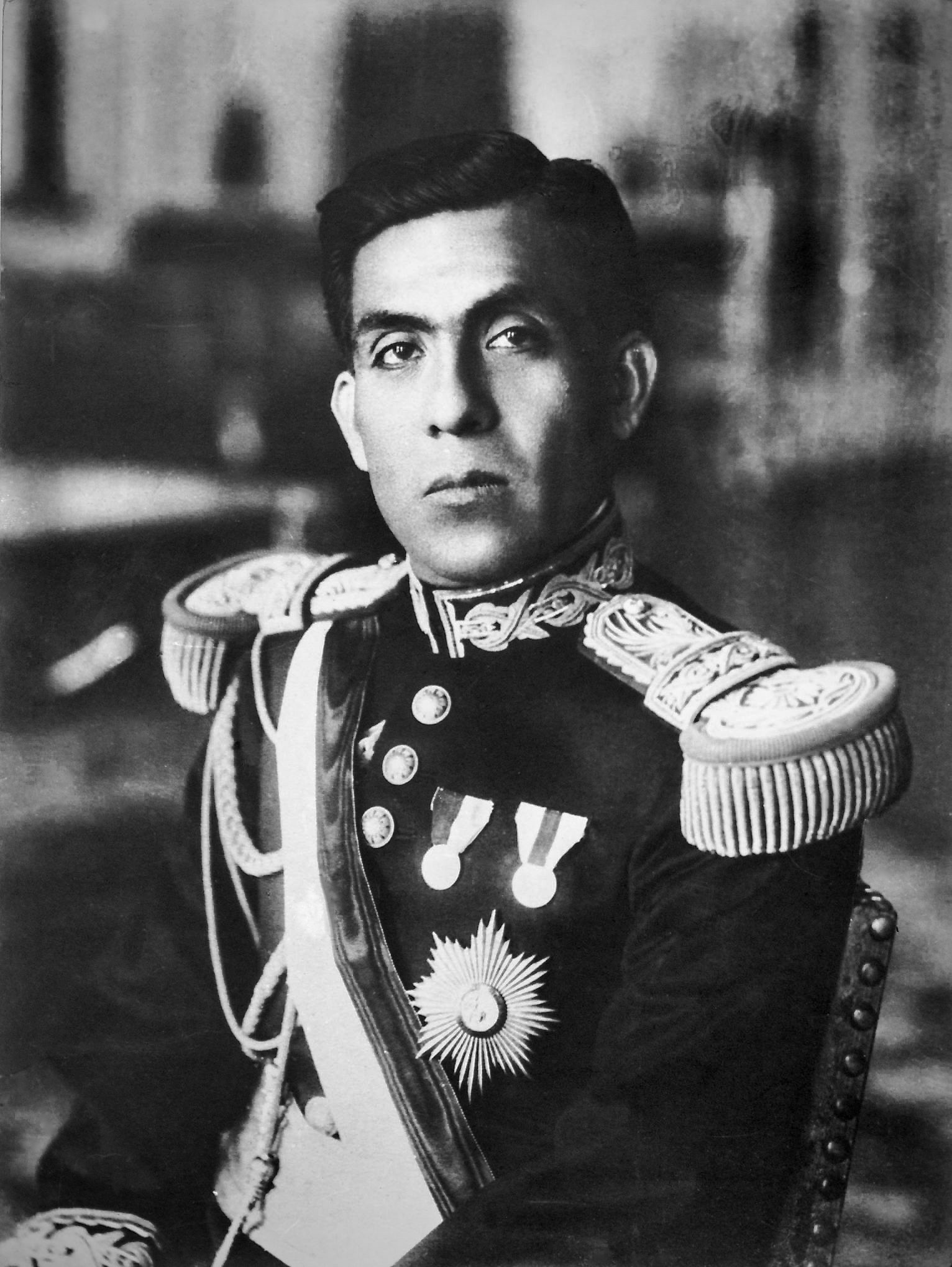
Luis Miguel Sánchez Cerro

- April 1 – Frederic Thesiger, 1st Viscount Chelmsford, British politician and colonial governor, Viceroy of India (b. 1868)
- April 2 – Ranjitsinhji, Indian cricketer and ruler of Nawanagar. (b. 1872)
- April 4 – William A. Moffett, U.S. admiral (crash of airship USS Akron (ZRS-4)) (b. 1869)
- April 7 – Archduke Charles Stephen of Austria (b. 1860)
- April 15 – Mary Isabella Macleod, North American pioneer (b. 1852)
- April 17 – Harriet Brooks, Canadian physicist (b. 1876)
- April 20 – William Courtenay, Canadian actor, director (b. 1875)
- April 22
  - Prince Ludwig Philipp of Thurn and Taxis (b. 1901)
  - Sir Henry Royce, English car manufacturer (b. 1863)
- April 23 – Tim Keefe, American baseball player, MLB Hall of Famer (b. 1857)
- April 29 - C.P. Cavafy, Greek-Egyptian poet (b. 1863)
- April 30 – Luis Miguel Sánchez Cerro, 77th Prime Minister of Peru, 48th President of Peru (assassinated) (b. 1889)

=== May ===
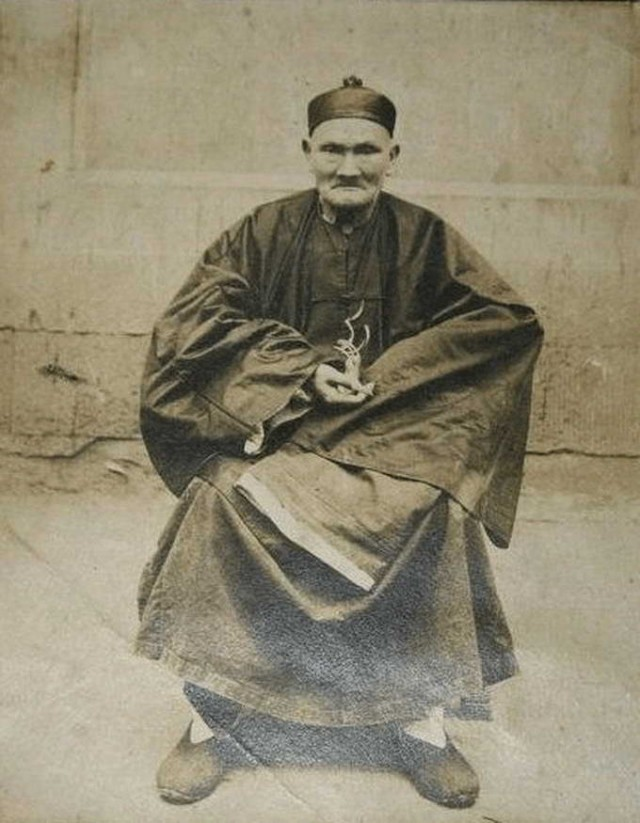
Li Ching-Yuen

- May 3 – Frederick Kerr, English actor (b. 1858)
- May 6 – Li Ching-Yuen, Chinese herbalist, martial artist and tactical advisor
- May 13 – Ernest Torrence, British actor (b. 1878)
- May 15 – Hermann von François, German general (b. 1856)
- May 16 – John Henry Mackay, Scottish-born German anarchist writer and philosopher (b. 1864)
- May 22 – Sándor Ferenczi, Hungarian psychoanalyst (b. 1873)
- May 24
  - Percy C. Mather, British Protestant missionary (b. 1882)
  - Rosslyn Wemyss, 1st Baron Wester Wemyss, British admiral (b. 1864)
- May 26
  - Horatio Bottomley, British politician and businessman (b. 1860)
  - Jimmie Rodgers, American country singer (b. 1897)

=== June ===
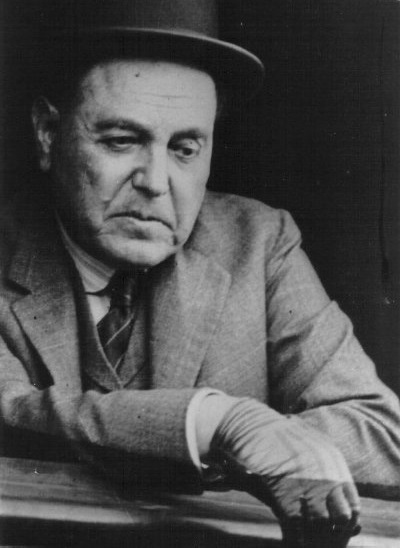
Hipólito Yrigoyen

- June 2 – Frank Jarvis, American athlete (b. 1878)
- June 7 – Cyrus H. K. Curtis, American publisher (b. 1850)
- June 15 – Hildegard Burjan, German Roman Catholic nun and blessed (b. 1883)
- June 18 – Harry Sweet, American actor and director (b. 1901)
- June 25
  - Jean Cugnot, French Olympic cyclist (b. 1899)
  - Giovanni Giacometti, Swiss painter (b. 1868)
- June 29 – Roscoe Arbuckle, American actor, comedian, film director and screenwriter (b. 1887)

=== July ===
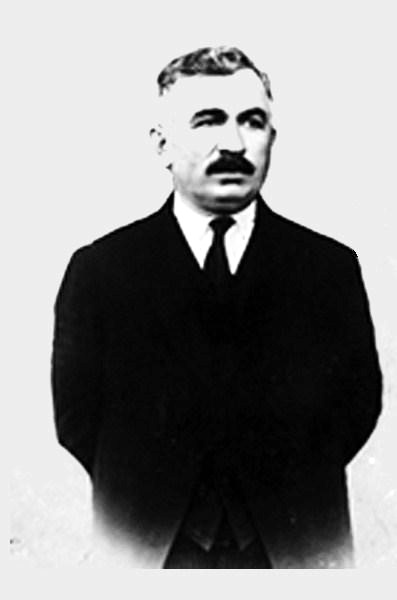
Sulejman Delvina

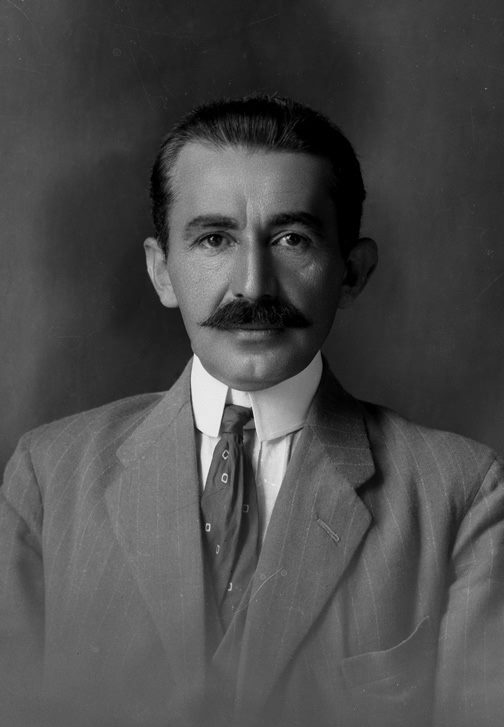
Hasan Prishtina

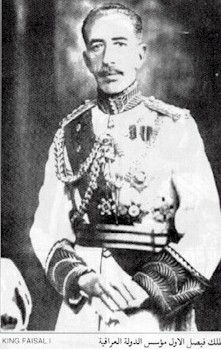
King Faisal of Iraq

- July 3
  - Hipólito Yrigoyen, 18th President of Argentina (b. 1852)
  - Franz Wilhelm Seiwert, German painter, sculptor (b. 1894)
- July 6 – Robert Kajanus, Finnish conductor and composer (b. 1856)
- July 11 – Edward Dillon, American actor, director (b. 1879)
- July 15
  - Irving Babbitt, American literary critic (b. 1865)
  - Freddie Keppard, American jazz musician (b. 1890)
  - Léon de Witte de Haelen, Belgian general (b. 1857)
- July 18 – Charles Prince, French actor (b. 1872)
- July 27 – Nobuyoshi Mutō, Japanese field marshal, ambassador (b. 1868)

=== August ===
- August 1 – Sulejman Delvina, Albanian politician, 5th Prime Minister of Albania (b. 1884)
- August 10 – Alf Morgans, Australian politician, 4th Premier of Western Australia (b. 1850)
- August 13 – Hasan Prishtina, Albanian politician, 8th Prime Minister of Albania (b. 1873)
- August 18 – James Williamson, British film director (b. 1855)
- August 22 – Alexandros Kontoulis, Greek general (b. 1858)
- August 23
  - Marie Cahill, American singer, actress (b. 1866)
  - Adolf Loos, Austrian-Czechoslovak architect (b. 1870)
- August 30 – Kustaa Ahmala, Finnish politician (b. 1867)

=== September ===
- September 2 – Francesco de Pinedo, Italian aviator (b. 1890)
- September 7 – Edward Grey, 1st Viscount Grey of Fallodon, British statesman (b. 1862)
- September 8 – King Faisal I of Iraq (b. 1885)
- September 10 – Giuseppe Campari, Italian opera singer, Grand Prix driver (b. 1892)
- September 17
  - Jules Culot, French entomologist (b. 1861)
  - Joseph De Piro, Maltese Roman Catholic priest, missionary and Servant of God (b. 1877)
- September 20 – Annie Besant, British Theosophist, women's rights activist, writer and orator (b. 1847)
- September 21 – Kenji Miyazawa, Japanese novelist and poet of children's literature (b. 1896)
- September 24 – Dorothea Baird, British actress (b. 1875)
- September 25
  - Paul Ehrenfest, Austrian-Dutch physicist (b. 1880)
  - Ring Lardner, American writer (b. 1885)
- September 26 – William Kennedy-Cochran-Patrick, British-born flying ace (b. 1896)
- September 28 – Alexander von Krobatin, Austro-Hungarian field marshal and politician (b. 1849)

=== October ===
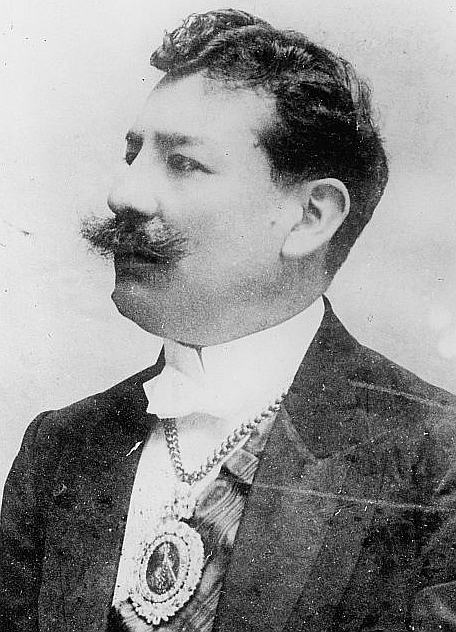
Ismael Montes

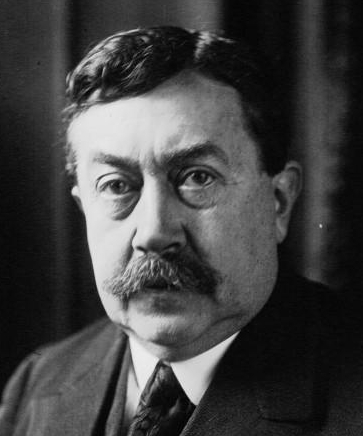
Paul Painlevé

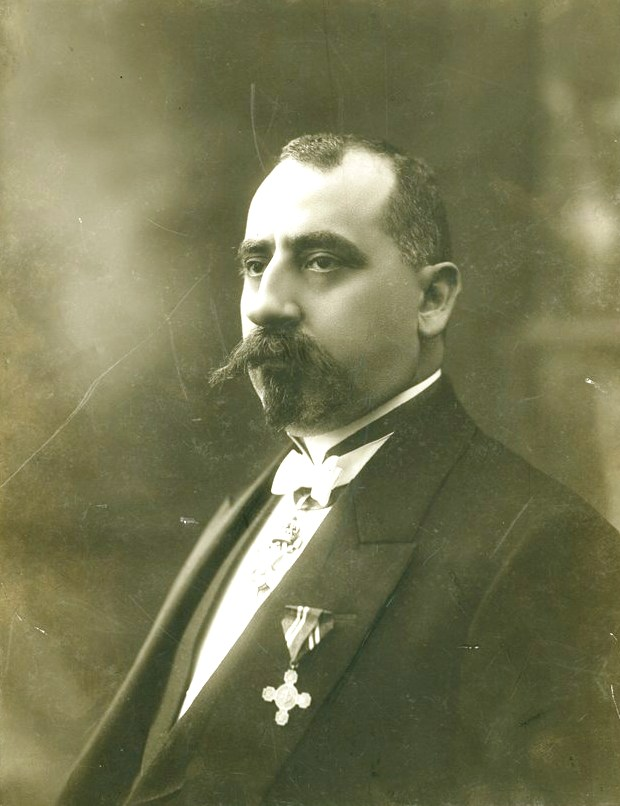
Andrey Lyapchev

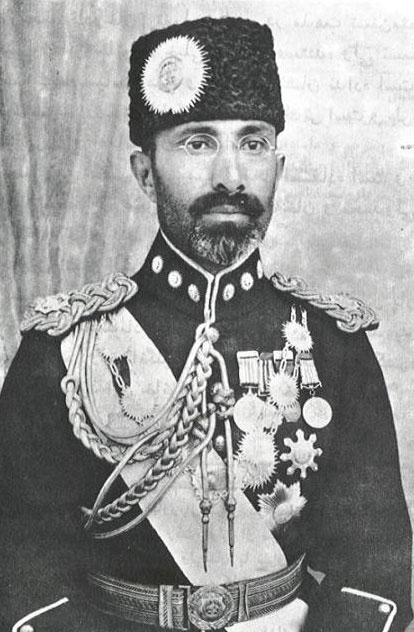
King Mohammad Nadir Shah

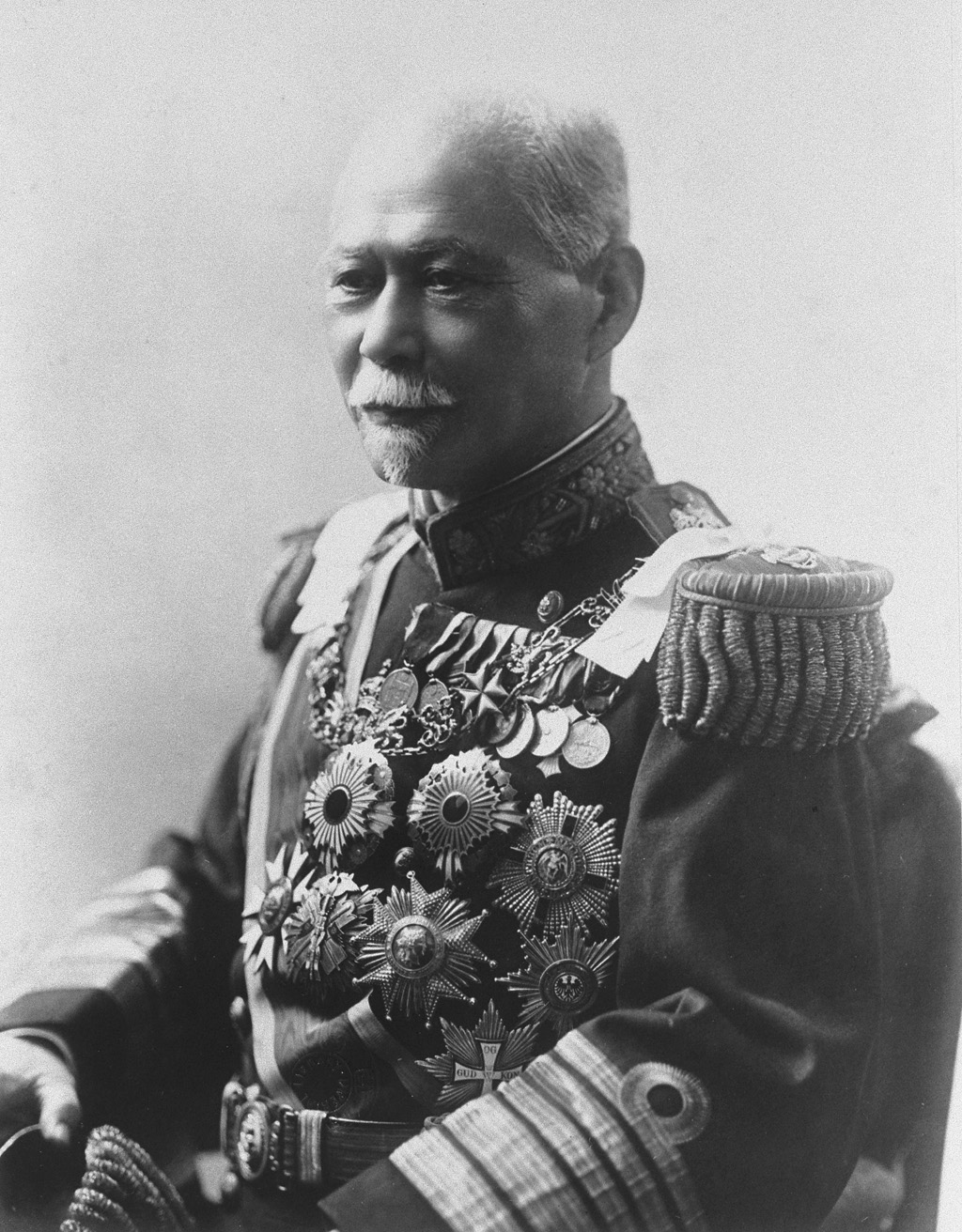
Yamamoto Gonnohyoe

- October 1 – Joseph Hofmeister, Czech American bandleader, composer and musical educator (b. 1867)
- October 4 – Edward Lyon Buchwalter, American Union captain and businessman (b. 1841)
- October 5 – Renée Adorée, French actress (b. 1898)
- October 7 – Jo Labadie, American labor organizer (b. 1850)
- October 16 – Ismael Montes, Bolivian general and political figure, 26th President of Bolivia (b. 1861)
- October 27 – Emily Murphy, Canadian woman's rights activist (b. 1868)
- October 29
  - George Luks, American painter (b. 1867)
  - Albert Calmette, French bacteriologist, immunologist (b. 1863)
  - Paul Painlevé, French mathematician and statesman, 62nd Prime Minister of France (b. 1863)

=== November ===
- November 2 – Gao Qifeng, Chinese painter (b. 1889)
- November 3 – Pierre Paul Émile Roux, French physician (b. 1853)
- November 5 – Texas Guinan, American actress, producer and entrepreneur (b. 1884)
- November 6 – Andrey Lyapchev, 22nd Prime Minister of Bulgaria (b. 1866)
- November 8
  - Pietro Albertoni, Italian psychologist, politician (b. 1849)
  - Mohammad Nadir Shah, King of Afghanistan (b. 1883)
- November 16 – Kyrillos III of Cyprus, archbishop of the Cypriot Orthodox Church (b. 1859)
- November 18 – Francisco Javier Gaxiola, Mexican diplomat, lawyer and politician (b. 1870)
- November 20 – Augustine Birrell, English politician and author (b. 1850)
- November 21 – Inez Clough, American actress (b. 1873)
- November 23
  - Eusebio Hernández Pérez, Cuban eugenicist, obstetrician, and guerrilla (b. 1853)
  - François Albert, French journalist (b. 1874)
- November 30 – Sir Arthur Currie, Canadian general (b. 1875)

=== December ===
- December 2
  - Clarence Burton, American actor (b. 1882)
  - Émile Meyerson, Polish-French epistemologist, chemist and philosopher (b. 1859)
- December 4 – Stefan George, German poet (b. 1868)
- December 6 – Auguste Chapuis, French composer (b. 1858)
- December 8
  - Yamamoto Gonnohyoe, Imperial Japanese army officer, 8th Prime Minister of Japan (b. 1852)
  - Karl Jatho, German airplane pioneer (b. 1873)
  - John Joly, Irish physicist (b. 1857)
- December 10 – János Hadik, 19th prime minister of Hungary (b. 1863)
- December 16 – Robert W. Chambers, American writer (b. 1865)
- December 17
  - Thubten Gyatso, 13th Dalai Lama (b. 1876)
  - Oskar Potiorek, Austro-Hungarian general (b. 1853)
- December 18 – Hans Vaihinger, German philosopher (b. 1852)
- December 19
  - George Jackson Churchward, English Great Western Railway chief mechanical engineer (b. 1857)
  - Friedrich von Ingenohl, German admiral (b. 1857)
- December 21
  - Dora Montefiore, English suffragist and socialist (b. 1851)
  - Knud Rasmussen, Danish polar explorer and anthropologist (b. 1879)
  - Tod Sloan, American jockey (b. 1874)
- December 24 – Prince Aribert of Anhalt (b. 1866)
- December 25 – Francesc Macià, President of the Generalitat (autonomous government of Catalonia) (b. 1859)
- December 26 – Anatoly Lunacharsky, Russian Marxist revolutionary (b. 1875)
- December 29 – Ion G. Duca, 35th Prime Minister of Romania (b. 1879)

== Nobel Prizes ==

- Physics – Erwin Schrödinger and Paul Adrien Maurice Dirac
- Chemistry – not awarded
- Physiology or Medicine – Thomas Hunt Morgan
- Literature – Ivan Bunin
- Peace – Sir Norman Angell (Ralph Lane)
