= Patriarch Arsenius =

Patriarch Arsenius may refer to:

- Patriarch Arsenius of Alexandria, Greek Patriarch of Alexandria in 1000–1010
- Patriarch Arsenius I of Constantinople, Ecumenical Patriarch of Constantinople in 1255–1260 and 1261–1267
- Serbian Patriarch Arsenius II, Serbian Patriarch from 1457 to 1463
- Serbian Patriarch Arsenius III, Serbian Patriarch from 1674 to 1690 (1706)
- Serbian Patriarch Arsenius IV, Serbian Patriarch from 1725 to 1737 (1748)

== See also ==
- Arsenius (name)
- Patriarch (disambiguation)
- Patriarch Arsenije (disambiguation)
