= Arsen =

Arsen (in Armenian, Արսեն; Georgian, არსენ; Russian, Арсен; Ukrainian, Арсен) is a given name, a diminutive of Greek Arsenios. Notable people with the name include:

- Arsen Akayev (born 1970), Kumyk-Russian professional football coach and a former player
- Arsen Avakov (born 1964), Ukrainian politician
- Arsen Avakov (born 1971), former Tajik football player
- Arsen Avetisyan (born 1973), Armenian football player
- Arsen Aydinian (1825–1902), Armenian priest, linguist, grammarian, and master of ten languages
- Arsen Balabekyan (born 1986), Armenian football striker
- Arsen Beglaryan (born 1993), Armenian football player
- Arsen Dedić (1938–2015), Croatian singer-songwriter, musician and composer and a poet
- Arsen Fadzayev (born 1962), former Soviet wrestler, world champion and Olympic champion in freestyle wrestling
- Arsen Gasparian, former Armenian press secretary, publisher and cigar manufacturer
- Arsen Gitinov (born 1977), male freestyle wrestler from Kyrgyzstan
- Arsen Goshokov (born 1991), Russian footballer
- Arsen Kanokov (born 1957), President of Kabardino-Balkaria
- Arsen Karađorđević (1859–1938), Serbian royalty
- Arsen Kasabiev (born 1987), Georgian weightlifter of Ossetian origin
- Arsen Kotsoyev (1872–1944), one of the founders of Ossetic prose
- Arsen Martirosian (born 1977), Armenian super bantamweight boxer
- Arsen Mekokishvili (1912–1972), Georgian Soviet wrestler and Olympic champion in Freestyle wrestling
- Arsen Melikyan (born 1976), Armenian weightlifter and Olympic medallist
- Arsen Minasian (1916–1977), founder of Gilan's sanatorium, the first modern sanatorium in Iran, in 1954
- Arsen Mirzoyan, Ukrainian singer
- Arsen Ninotsmindeli (died 1082), Georgian calligrapher
- Arsen Ostrovsky (born 1987, in Odessa), pro-Israel advocate and lawyer.
- Arsen Papikyan (born 1972), Russian professional football coach and a former player
- Arsen Roulette (born 1976), American singer, lyricist, guitar player and upright bass player
- Arsen Terteryan (1882–1953), Soviet Armenian literary critic, academic of Science Academy of Armenia
- Arsen Tlekhugov (born 1976), Kazakh football forward
- Raymonde Arsen, servant in the Comté de Foix in the early fourteenth century

== Companies ==
- Arsen (company), American cigar company

== See also ==
- Arsenius (name)
- Arsène
- Arseni
- Arsenović
