= Arsenijević =

Arsenijević (Serbian Cyrillic: Арсенијевић) is a Serbian surname, a patronymic derived from the given name Arsenije (from Greek Arsenios). It may refer to:

- Milorad Arsenijević (d. 1987), Yugoslav Serbian footballer
- Filip Arsenijević, Serbian footballer
- Stefan Arsenijević (born 1977), Serbian film director
- Nemanja Arsenijević (born 1986), Serbian footballer
- Vladimir Arsenijević (born 1965), Serbian novelist
- Marina Arsenijevic (born 1970), Serbian-born American concert pianist and composer

== See also ==
- Arsenović
- Arsić
