= Archbishop Arsenije =

Archbishop Arsenije may refer to:

- Archbishop Arsenije I, Serbian Archbishop from 1233 to 1263
- Archbishop Arsenije II, Archbishop of Peć and Serbian Patriarch from 1457 to 1463
- Archbishop Arsenije III, Archbishop of Peć and Serbian Patriarch from 1674 to 1690 (1706)
- Archbishop Arsenije IV, Archbishop of Peć and Serbian Patriarch from 1725 to 1737 (1748)

== See also ==
- Arsenije (name)
- Patriarch Arsenije (disambiguation)
- List of heads of the Serbian Orthodox Church
