= Arsić =

Arsić (Serbian Cyrillic: Арсић) is a Serbian surname, a patronymic derived from the given names Arsa and Arso (themselves diminutives of Arsenije). It may refer to:

- Eustahija Arsić (1776–1843), Serbian writer
- Jovica Arsić (born 1968), Serbian basketball coach
- Lazar Arsić (born 1991), Serbian footballer
- Petar Arsić (born 1973), Serbian former professional basketballer
- Tihomir Arsić (1957–2020), Serbian actor

== See also ==
- Arsenijević
- Arsenović
