= Arsenović =

Arsenović (Serbian Cyrillic: Арсеновић, IPA: [ǎrsɛːnɔʋit͡ɕ]) is a Serbian surname, a patronymic derived from the given name Arsen (itself a diminutive of Greek Arsenios). It may refer to:

- Dragan Arsenović (1952–2004), Yugoslav Serbian footballer
- Konstantin Arsenović (1940–2017), Serb politician and military official in Serbia serving in the National Assembly of Serbia from 2008 until his death in 2017
- Nikola Arsenović (1823–1887), Serb tailor and designer, called a Yugoslav ethnographer

== See also ==
- Arsenijević
- Arsen
- Arsène
- Arsić
