= Trouvé =

Trouvé is a French surname. Notable people with the surname include:

- Arsène Trouvé (fl. 1831–1835, French painter
- Aurélie Trouvé (born 1979), French politician
- Gustave Trouvé (1839–1902), French electrical engineer and inventor
- Kristof Trouvé (born 1976), Belgian former professional road cyclist
- Rudy Trouvé (born 1967), Belgian musician
- Tatiana Trouvé (born 1968), French artist

== See also ==
- Ariste Jacques Trouvé-Chauvel (1805–1883), French businessman, banker and politician
