= Arsenyev (surname) =

Arsenyev / Arseniev (masculine) or Arsenyeva / Arsenieva (feminine) is a Russian patronymic surname derived from the given name Arseny. Notable people with the surname include:

- Arsenyevs, Russian noble family
- Anton Arsenyev (footballer)
- Dmitry Arsenyev (1832–1915), Russian admiral
- Konstantin Ivanovich Arsenyev (1789–1865), Russian geographer and historian
- Konstantin Arsenyev (1837–1919), Russian lawyer, essayist, and political activist
- Mikhail Arseniev
- Natallia Arsiennieva
- Nikolay Arsenyev (1739–1796), Russian major-general
- Nikolay Arsenyev (writer) (1888–1977), Russian/Soviet religious philosopher and writer
- Vladimir Arsenyev (1872–1930), Russian/Soviet explorer, scientist, and writer
- Varvara Arsenyeva, Russian courtier and mistress of Peter the Great.
- Vladimir Romanovich Arsenyev (1948–2010), Soviet/Russian ethnographer and writer

== Fictional characters ==
- Protagonist of The Life of Arseniev

== See also ==
- Arsentyev
