= Nikanor Onatsky Regional Art Museum in Sumy =

- Сумський округовий художньо-історичний музей ім.Никанора Онацького
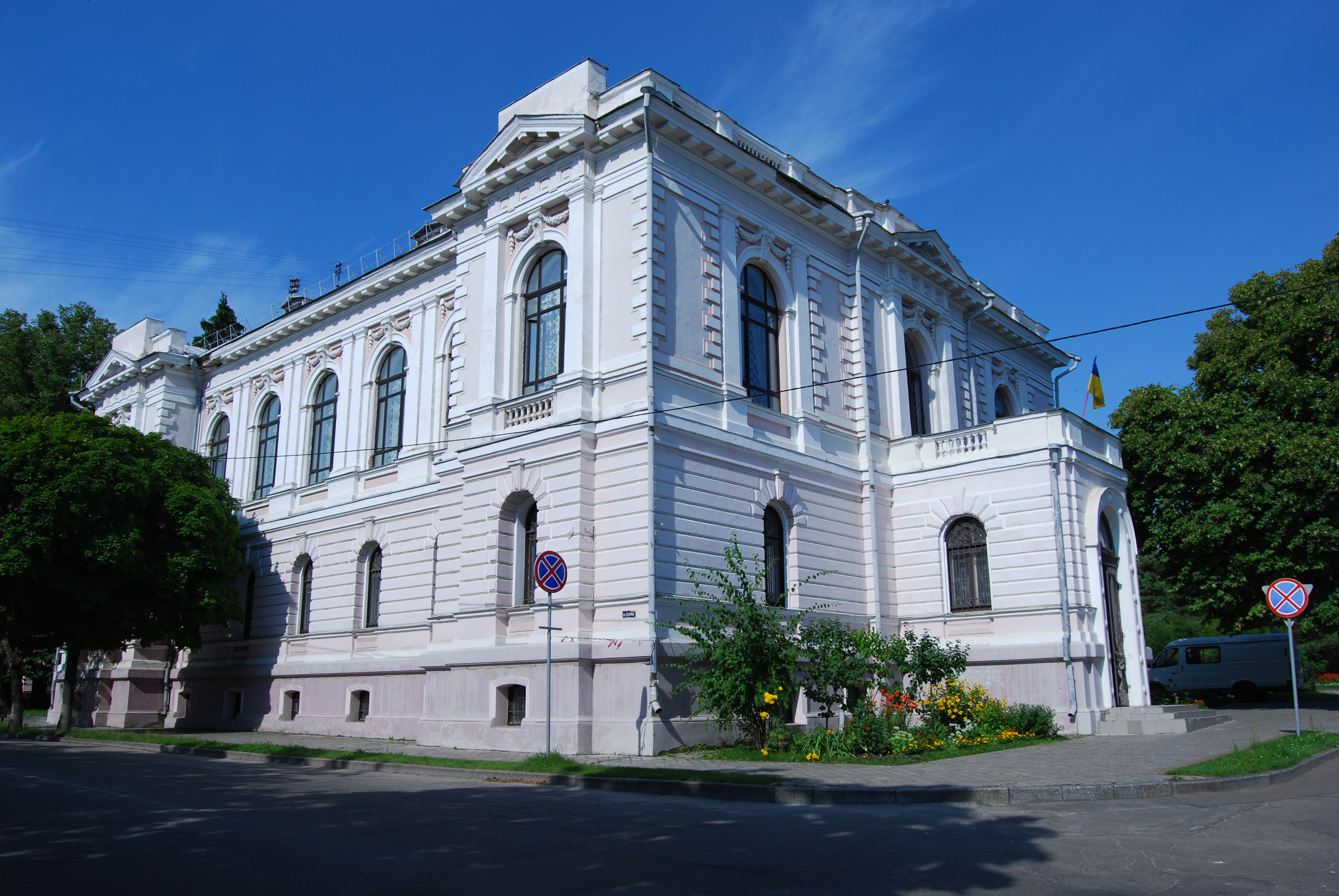
- The museum in 2017
- Established: March 1, 1920
- Location: Sumy, Sumy Oblast, Ukraine
- Coordinates: 50°54′21″N 34°47′59″E
- Type: Art museum; Cultural institution
- Collection size: 10,279
- Founder: Nykanor Onatskyi
- Director: Chayanova Alla Valerievna
- Owner: Nykanor Onatskyi
- Website: http://artmuseum.sumy.ua

Immovable Monument of Local Significance of Ukraine
- Official name: Будинок державного банку (Building of the state bank)
- Type: Architecture
- Reference no.: 2749-См

The Nikanor Onatsky Regional Art Museum in Sumy (Ukrainian: Сумський художній музей імені Никанора Онацького) is a state-owned museum in Sumy, Ukraine. Its collection is one of the best in Ukraine and contains works of native and from all over the world artists.

It is a real treasure trove of national and foreign fine and decorative arts of 16th–21st centuries, based on the art collection of the famous Kyiv industrialist and philanthropist Oskar Hansen.

== History and exposition ==
The museum was founded on March 1, 1920, by Nikanor Onatsky (1875–1937), an artist, teacher and public figure, an apprentice of Ilya Repin.

The museum was formed on the basis of local private collections that had been nationalised and O. Gansen's collection that was located in the city at that time.

The exposition and the funds of the museum number over 15,000 museum pieces.

The exposition occupies eight rooms of the two-storey mansion that was built in the late 19th – early 20th century by G. Sholts, an architect from Sumy, and originally housed the State Bank of the Russian Empire. On display there are paintings, drawings, sculptures, decorative works by the old masters as well as by modern artists, from both Ukraine and abroad.

== Gallery ==
=== Paintings ===
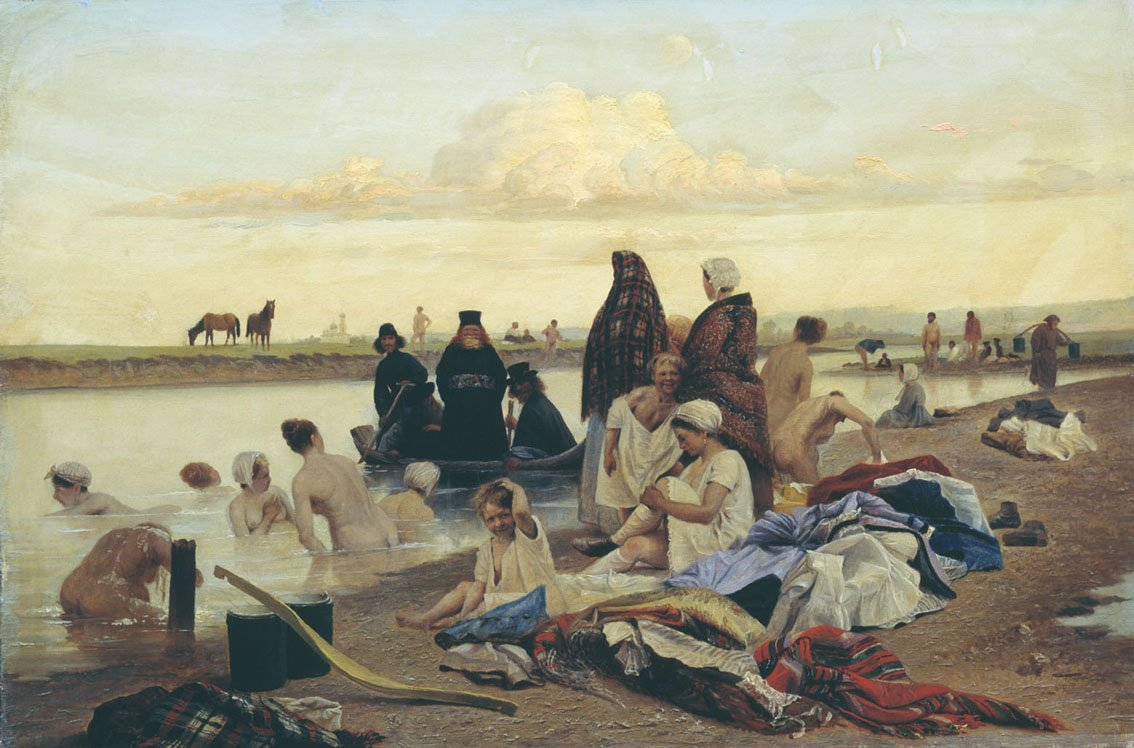
Monks. Went to the wrong place (1870s), by Lev Grigorievich Solovyov

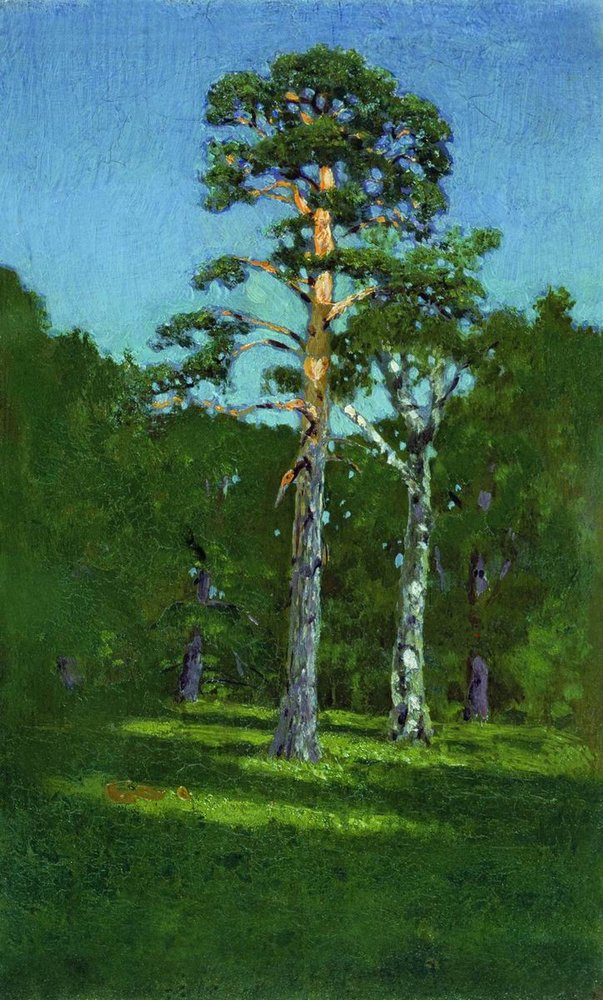
Pine (1878), by Arkhip Kuindzhi

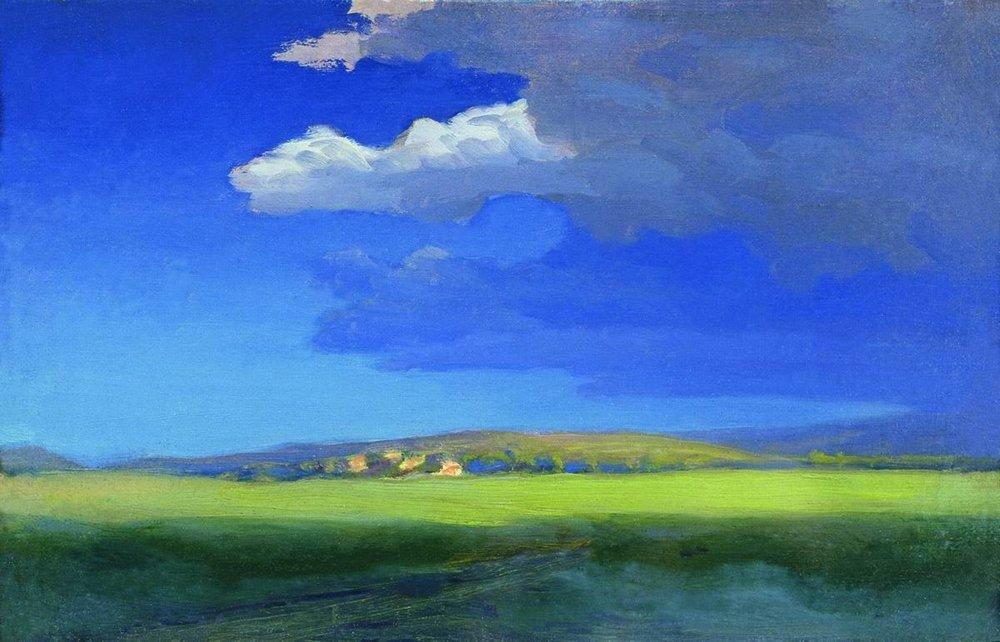
After the thunderstorm (1879), by Arkhip Kuindzhi

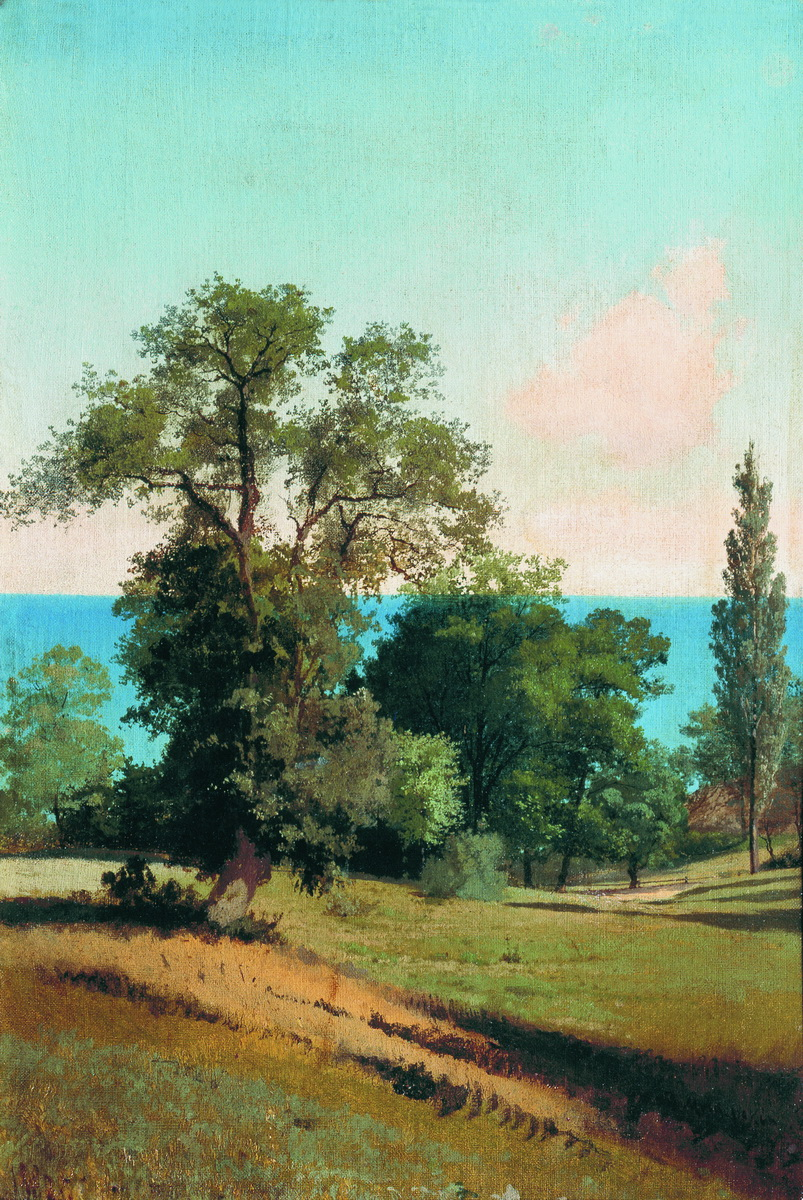
Southern Landscape (1880), by Arseny Meshchersky

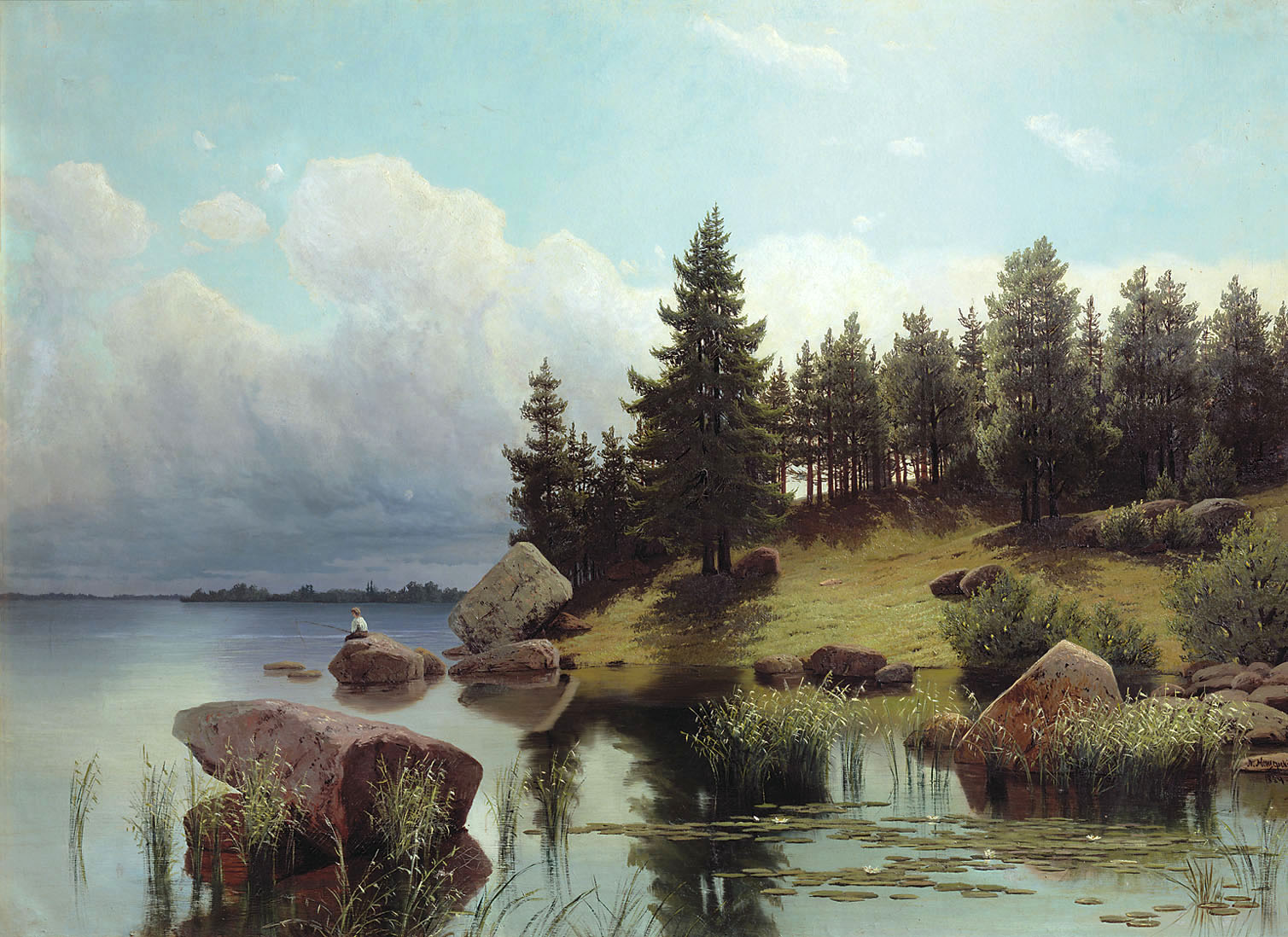
Forest Lake (1884), by Arseny Meshchersky
