= Alexandrine von Wistinghausen =

Baltic German landscape painter (1850–ca. 1914–1918)

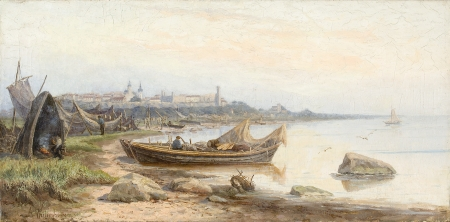
- Tallinna vaade Piritalt by Alexandrine von Wistinghausen
- Born: 20 January 1850 (in Julian calendar); Tallinn
- Occupation: Painter
- Parent(s): Alexander von Wistinghausen; Friederike Karoline Helene von Wistinghausen

Amalie Henriette Alexandrine von Wistinghausen (20 January 1850 (Julian) – ca. 1914–1918) was a Baltic German landscape painter.

Alexandrine von Wistinghausen was born on 20 January 1850 in Reval, Estonia. She was the daughter of Alexander von Wistinghausen and Karoline von Wistinghausen, the daughter of Otto von Kotzebue. She exhibited in Estonia and at the St. Petersburg Academy of Arts.

She studied under Julius von Klever in St Petersburg and Octave de Champeaux in Paris.
