= Arsenio =

Arsenio is an Italian, Portuguese, and Spanish version of the male given name Arsenius. It may refer to:

== People ==
- Arsenio Balisacan, Filipino economist
- Arsénio Bano (born 1974), East Timorese politician
- Arsenio Benítez (born 1971), Paraguayan footballer
- Arsenio Chaparro Cardoso (born 1960), Colombian racing cyclist
- Arsenio Chirinos (1934–2015), Venezuelan cyclist
- Arsenio Climaco (1870–1952), Filipino politician
- Arsenio Corsellas (1933–2019), Spanish voice actor
- Arsenio Cruz Herrera (1863–1917), Filipino politician
- Arsénio Duarte (1925–1986), Portuguese footballer
- Arsenio Duodo, 15th century Venetian merchant and politician
- Arsenio da Trigolo (1849–1909), Italian Roman Catholic priest
- Arsenio Erico (1915–1977), Paraguayan footballer
- Arsenio Farell (1921–2005), Mexican lawyer and politician
- Arsenio Fernández de Mesa (born 1955), Spanish politician
- Arsenio Frugoni (1914–1970), Italian medieval historian
- Arsenio González (born 1960), Spanish cyclist
- Arsenio Halfhuid (born 1991), Dutch footballer
- Arsenio Hall (born 1956), American entertainer
- Arsenio Iglesias (born 1930), Spanish footballer
- Arsenio Jazmin (born 1935), Filipino sprinter
- Arsenio Lacson (1912–1962), Filipino journalist and politician
- Arsenio Laurel (1931–1967), race car driver
- Arsenio Linares y Pombo (1848–1914), Spanish military officer and government official
- Arsenio Luzardo (born 1959), Uruguayan footballer
- Arsenio López (born 1979), Puerto Rican swimmer
- Arsenio Martínez Campos (1831–1900), Spanish officer
- Arsénio Nunes (born 1989), Portuguese footballer
- Arsénio Pompílio Pompeu de Carpo (1792–1869), Portuguese slave trader
- Arsenio Rodríguez (1911–1970), Cuban musician
- Arsenio Valpoort (born 1992), Dutch footballer
- E. Arsenio Manuel (1909–2003), Philippine historian and anthropologist

== See also ==
- The Arsenio Hall Show - late night talk show often referred to as Arsenio
- Arsenio (TV series), 1997 American situation comedy
- Arsenios Autoreianos (c. 1200–1273), Ecumenical Patriarch of Constantinople
- Linda Arsenio (born 1978), American actress and model
- Raúl Arsenio Oviedo, town in Paraguay
- Sant'Arsenio, town in Italy
