= Patriarch Arsenije =

Patriarch Arsenije may refer to:

- Patriarch Arsenije II, Archbishop of Peć and Serbian Patriarch from 1457 to 1463
- Patriarch Arsenije III, Archbishop of Peć and Serbian Patriarch from 1674 to 1690 (1706)
- Patriarch Arsenije IV, Archbishop of Peć and Serbian Patriarch from 1725 to 1737 (1748)

== See also ==
- Arsenije (name)
- Archbishop Arsenije (disambiguation)
- Patriarch Gavrilo (disambiguation)
- List of heads of the Serbian Orthodox Church
