= Patriarch Gabriel =

Patriarch Gabriel may refer to:

- Gabriel I of Constantinople, Ecumenical Patriarch of Constantinople in 1596
- Gabriel II of Constantinople, Ecumenical Patriarch of Constantinople in 1657
- Gabriel III of Constantinople, Ecumenical Patriarch of Constantinople in 1702–1707
- Gabriel IV of Constantinople, Ecumenical Patriarch of Constantinople in 1780–1785
- Pope Gabriel I of Alexandria, Pope of Alexandria & Patriarch of the See of St. Mark in 910–920/1
- Pope Gabriel II of Alexandria, Pope of Alexandria & Patriarch of the See of St. Mark in 1131–1145
- Pope Gabriel III of Alexandria, Pope of Alexandria & Patriarch of the See of St. Mark in 1268–1271
- Pope Gabriel IV of Alexandria, Pope of Alexandria & Patriarch of the See of St. Mark in 1370–1378
- Pope Gabriel V of Alexandria, Pope of Alexandria & Patriarch of the See of St. Mark in 1408–1427
- Pope Gabriel VI of Alexandria, Pope of Alexandria & Patriarch of the See of St. Mark in 1466–1475
- Pope Gabriel VII of Alexandria, Pope of Alexandria & Patriarch of the See of St. Mark in 1525–1570
- Pope Gabriel VIII of Alexandria, Pope of Alexandria & Patriarch of the See of St. Mark in 1587–1603
- Pope Gabriel of Blaouza, Maronite Patriarch in 1704–1705

== See also ==
- Patriarch Gavrilo (disambiguation)
