= Arsène =

- Gender: male

Origin
- Origin: Greek
- Meaning: strong, virile
- Region of origin: Common in Francophone countries and regions

Other names
- Related names: Arsènie, Arsen

Arsène is a masculine French given name. It is derived from the Latin name Arsenius, the Latinized form of the Greek name Ἀρσἐνιος (Arsenios), which means "male, virile". It has also been used as a surname. It may refer to:

== Given name ==
- Arsène Alancourt (1904–1965), French professional road bicycle racer
- Arsène Alexandre (1859–1937), French art critic
- Arsène Auguste (1951–1993), Haitian footballer
- Arsène Copa (born 1988), Gabonese footballer
- Arsène Darmesteter (1846–1888), French philologist
- Arsène de Cey (1806–1887), French playwright and novelist
- Arsène Do Marcolino (born 1986), Gabonese footballer
- Arsène Heitz (1908–1989), French draughtsman, co-creator of the Flag of Europe
- Arsène Herbinier (1869–1955), French lithograph artist
- Arsène Houssaye (1815–1896), French novelist and poet
- Arsene James (1944–2018), Saint Lucian politician
- Arsène Kra Konan (born 19??), Ivorian sprinter
- Arsène Menessou (born 1987), Beninese international footballer
- Arsène Mersch (1913–1980), Luxembourger road bicycle racer
- Arsène Millocheau (1867–1948), French road bicycle racer
- Arsène Né (born 1981), Ivorian footballer
- Arsène Oka (born 1983), Ivorian footballer
- Arsène Piesset (1919–1987), French long-distance runner
- Arsène Pint (born 1933), Belgian pentathlete and Olympian
- Arsène Pujo (1861–1939), American politician
- Arsène Roux (1893–1971), French linguist, Arabist and Berberologist
- Arsene Tema Biwole (born 1992), Cameroonian nuclear engineer and plasma physicist
- Arsène Trouvé (fl. 1800s), French painter
- Arsène Tsaty-Boungou, Congolese politician
- Arsène Marie Paul Vauthier (1885–1979), French Major General
- Arsène Wenger (born 1949), French football manager

== Fictional characters ==
- Arsène Lupin is a gentleman thief created by novelist Maurice Leblanc.
- Lupin III, referred to as "Arsène Lupin III" in some English adaptations, is a gentleman thief created by manga artist Monkey Punch and the title character of the Lupin the Third franchise.
- Arsène, Joker's Persona in Persona 5

== Surname ==
- Dean Arsene (born 1980), Canadian ice hockey defenceman
- Faed Arsène (born 1985), Malagasy football striker
- Hervé Arsène (born 1963), Malagasy football player and coach

== See also ==
- Arsenius (name)
- Arsen
- Arsenović
