= Arsenis =

Arsenis is a Greek surname. Notable people with the surname include:

- Gerasimos Arsenis (1931–2016), Greek politician
- Kriton Arsenis (born 1977), Greek environmentalist and politician

== See also ==
- Arsenio
