= Arsenius =

Male given name

- Gender: Masculine
- Language: Greek
- Name day: May 8

Origin
- Origin: ἀρσενικός
- Meaning: "male" or "virile"

Other names
- Alternative spelling: Arsenios

Arsenius (Latinized form) and Arsenios (Greek form) is a male first name. It is derived from the Greek word arsenikos (ἀρσενικός), meaning "male" or "virile". The name is especially prevalent among followers of Eastern Orthodox Christianity, as it is the name of several saints. Arsenius' name day is May 8 in Greece.

It may refer to:

- Saint Arsenius the Great (c. 350 – 445), also known as Arsenius the Deacon, Arsenius of Scetis and Turah, and Arsenius the Roman
- Saint Arsenius of Corfu, first bishop of Corfu, (died c. 959) one of the principal patron saints of Corfu
- Patriarch Arsenius of Alexandria, patriarch of Alexandria from 1000 to 1010
- Saint Arsenius of Latros, (c. 8th–11th century), feast day December 13
- Saint Arsenije Sremac (died 1266), archbishop of Serbia
- Arsenius Autoreianos (died 1273), patriarch of Constantinople
- Saint Arsenius of Tver (died 1409), bishop of Tver, feast day March 2
- Saint Arsenius of Konevits (died 1447), founder of Konevits Monastery, feast day June 12
- Arsenije II, patriarch of Serbia 1457–1463
- Arsenius Apostolius (c. 1468 – 1538), Greek scholar and Bishop of Monemvasia
- Gualterus Arsenius (c. 1530 – c. 1580), instrument maker
- Saint Arsenius of Suzdal (died 1627), archbishop of Suzdal, feast day April 29
- Arsenije III Crnojević (1633–1706), patriarch of Serbia
- Arsenije IV Jovanović Šakabenta (1698–1748), patriarch of Serbia
- Arsenius Walsh (1804–1869), Irish Catholic missionary in Hawaii
- Saint Arsenius of Paros (1800–1877), feast day January 31
- Saint Arsenios the Cappadocian (1840–1924), god father and spiritual father of Saint Paisios of Mount Athos
- Arsenius Stadnitsky (1862–1936), Archbishop and then Metropolitan of Novgorod from 1910 to 1933
- Arsenios the Cave Dweller (1886–1983), Greek Orthodox monk and elder at Mount Athos
- Arsenius Heikkinen (born 1957), Bishop of Joensuu of the Orthodox Church of Finland
- Arsenios Kardamakis (born 1973), Greek Orthodox Metropolitan of Austria

== Variants ==
- Armenian: Arsen
- Georgian: Arsen
- French: Arsène
- Italian, Portuguese and Spanish: Arsenio
- Kazakh: Arsen
- Macedonian: Arsen
- Polish: Arseniusz
- Romanian: Arsenie
- Russian: Arseny (Russian: Арсений, also transliterated as Arseni, Arseniy, Arsenij, Arsenii). The Russian surname Arsenyev is derived from it. The older form of this name is Arsentiy (Арсентий)
- Serbian and other South Slavic languages: Arsenije and diminutives Arsen, Arsa
- Lithuanian: Arsenijus
- Hungarian: Arzén
