= Arsentyev =

Arsentyev / Arsentiev (masculine) or Arsentyeva / Arsentieva (feminine) is a Russian patronymic surname derived from the given name Arsentiy. Notable people with the surname include:

- Francys Arsentiev (1958–1998), American mountaineer

== See also ==
- Arsenyev (surname)
