= Arseny =

Arseny (officially transliterated as Arsenii) (also Arseni and Arseniy) (Russian: Арсений, Ukrainian: Арсеній) is a name, derived from Arsenius. Notable people with the name include:

== Arseny ==
- Arseny Avraamov (1886–1944), Russian avant-garde composer and theorist
- Arseny Bondarev (born 1985), Russian ice hockey player
- Arseny Borrero (born 1979), Cuban sport shooter
- Arseny of Winnipeg (Andrew Chagovstov) (1866–1945), bishop of the Russian Orthodox Greek Catholic Church in America
- Arseny Golenishchev-Kutuzov (1848–1913), Russian poet
- Arseny Koreshchenko (1870–1921), Russian pianist and composer
- Arseny Logashov (born 1991), Russian football
- Arseny Matseyevich (1697–1772), Russian archbishop
- Arseny Meshchersky (1834–1902), Russian landscape painter
- Arseny Pavlov (1983–2016), Russian militant
- Arseny Roginsky (born 1946), Soviet dissident and Russian historian
- Arseny Semionov (1911–1992), Soviet Russian painter and art teacher
- Arseny Sokolov (1910–1986), Russian theoretical physicist
- Arseny Tarkovsky (1907–1989), Soviet poet and translator
- Arseny Turbin (born 2008), Russian political activist
- Arseny Vvedensky (1844–1909), Russian literary critic, historian, essayist and author
- Arseny Zakrevsky (1783 or 1786–1865), Russian statesman and Minister of the Interior
- Arseny Zverev (1900–1969), Soviet Russian politician, economist and statesman

=== Spiritual Fathers ===
- Father Arseny, central figure of two books by Vera Bouteneff concerning a spiritual father in the former Soviet Union during the period of communist regime.

== Arseni ==
=== Given name ===
- Arseni Comas (born 1961), Spanish football player
- Arseni Markov (born 1981), Canadian-Russian competitive ice dancer

=== Surname ===
- Alexandru Arseni, Moldovan politician

== Arseniy ==
- Arseniy Golovko (1906–1962), Soviet admiral
- Arseniy Lavrentyev (born 1983), Russian-born Portuguese swimmer
- Arseniy Vorozheykin (1912–2001), commander in the Soviet Air Force
- Arseniy Yatsenyuk (born 1974), Ukrainian politician, economist and lawyer
