= Maksim Vorobyov (painter) =

Russian landscape painter (1787–1855)

- Максим Никифорович Воробьёв
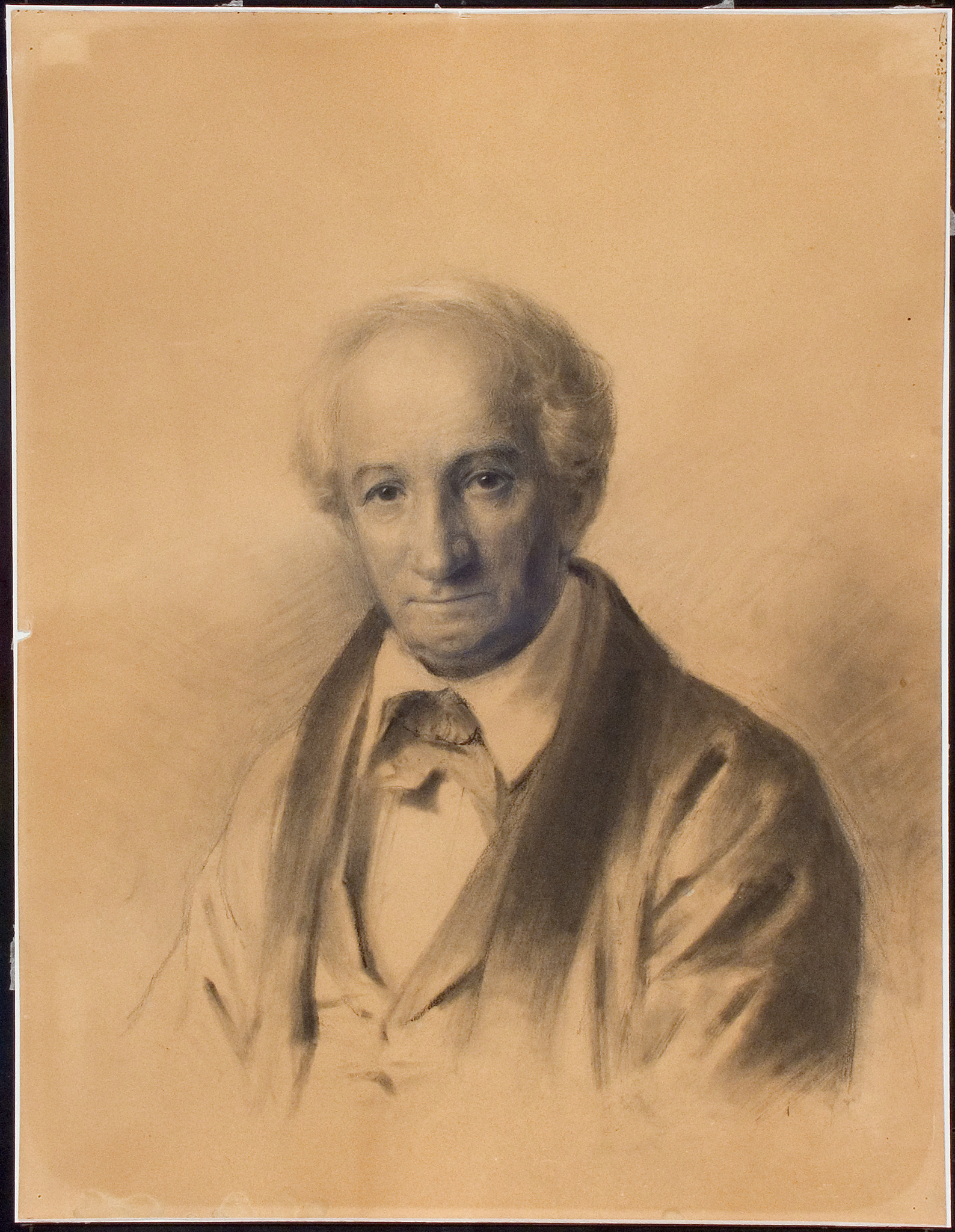
- Portrait drawing by Apolinary Horawski, 1854, pencils with stump and white on paper; Tretyakov Gallery, Moscow
- Born: August 6, 1787; Pskov
- Died: August 30, 1855 (aged 68); Saint Petersburg
- Resting place: Tikhvin Cemetery, St. Petersburg
- Education: Imperial Academy of Arts (1809)
- Known for: Landscape painting
- Elected: Member Academy of Arts (1814)

Maksim Nikiforovich Vorobyov (Russian: Макси́м Ники́форович Воробьёв; 17 August 1787, in Pskov – 11 September 1855, in Saint Petersburg) was a Russian landscape painter.

== Biography ==
He was the son of a retired soldier who later served as a custodian at the Imperial Academy of Arts. At the age of ten, he was enrolled in the elementary classes and went on to study landscape painting with Fyodor Alekseyev and architecture with Jean-François Thomas de Thomon. In 1809, Alekseyev joined an expedition to explore the historic areas of Central Russia and Vorobyov went with him as an assistant.

In 1813-1814, he accompanied the Russian army on its campaigns in Germany and France. In 1815, he became a teacher at the Academy, a position he held until his death. Later, in 1820, he would make a trip to Palestine as part of a diplomatic mission, on behalf of then Grand Duke Nikolai Pavlovich, to draw and make architectural plans of the major Christian sites, for eventual use on projects near Moscow. Most of this work had to be done in secret to avoid interference by the local Ottoman authorities. Besides the ancient ruins, he also drew sketches of contemporary Jerusalem and the Dead Sea as well as scenes from Istanbul, Smyrna, Jaffa and other places he passed through. The final result was a collection of over 90 watercolor sheets that would serve as the basis for many paintings. He received a lifetime pension for his work there.

During the Russo-Turkish War he was attached to the retinue of Nicholas I (now the Tsar) to sketch and make paintings upon his direction, which included several scenes from the Siege of Varna. Following the sudden death of his beloved wife Cleo in 1840, he fell into a period of chronic depression and alcoholism which led to the illness that eventually took his life. His output decreased to a trickle, consisting largely of sketches made from 1844 to 1846 while travelling through Italy in an effort to assuage his grief. When he died, most of his paintings were still in his possession or being passed around by friends and associates. The majority are now in palaces or private collections. He was also a talented violinist. Some of his best known students were Lev Lagorio, Mikhail Clodt, and Alexey Bogolyubov. His son, Sokrat, also became a landscape painter and art teacher.

== Selected paintings ==
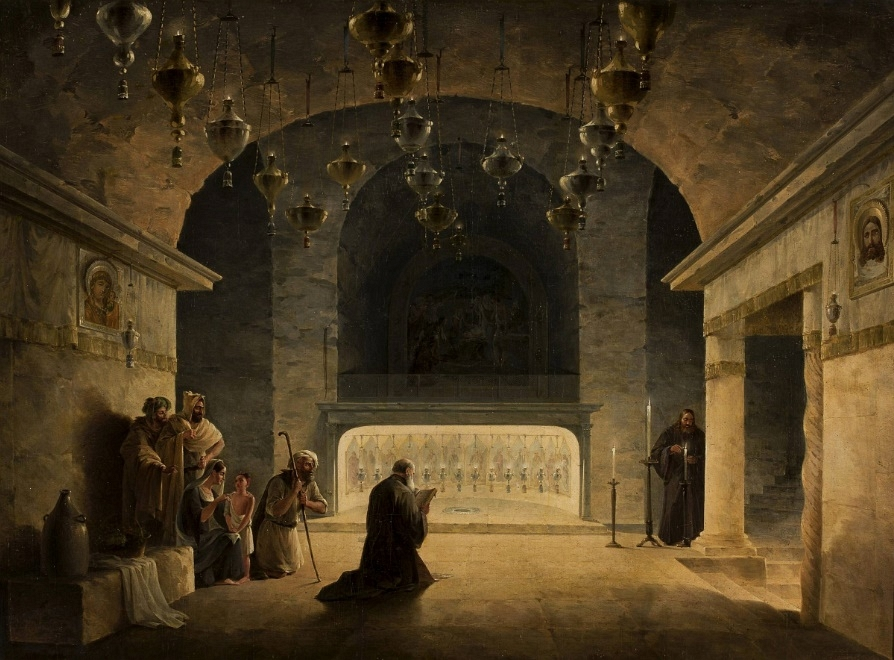
View of Church of the Nativity

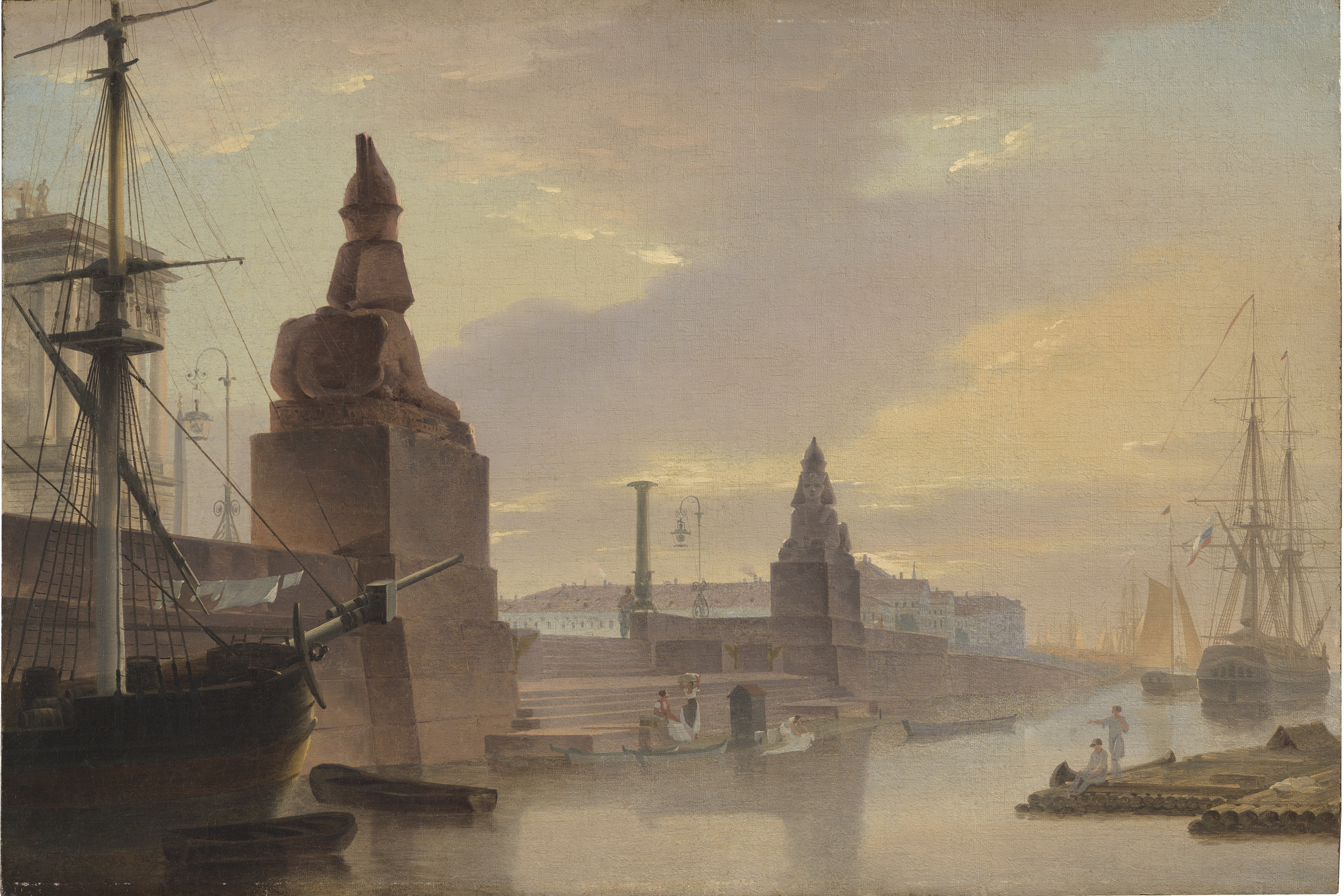
Sphinxes on a Quay Near the Imperial Academy

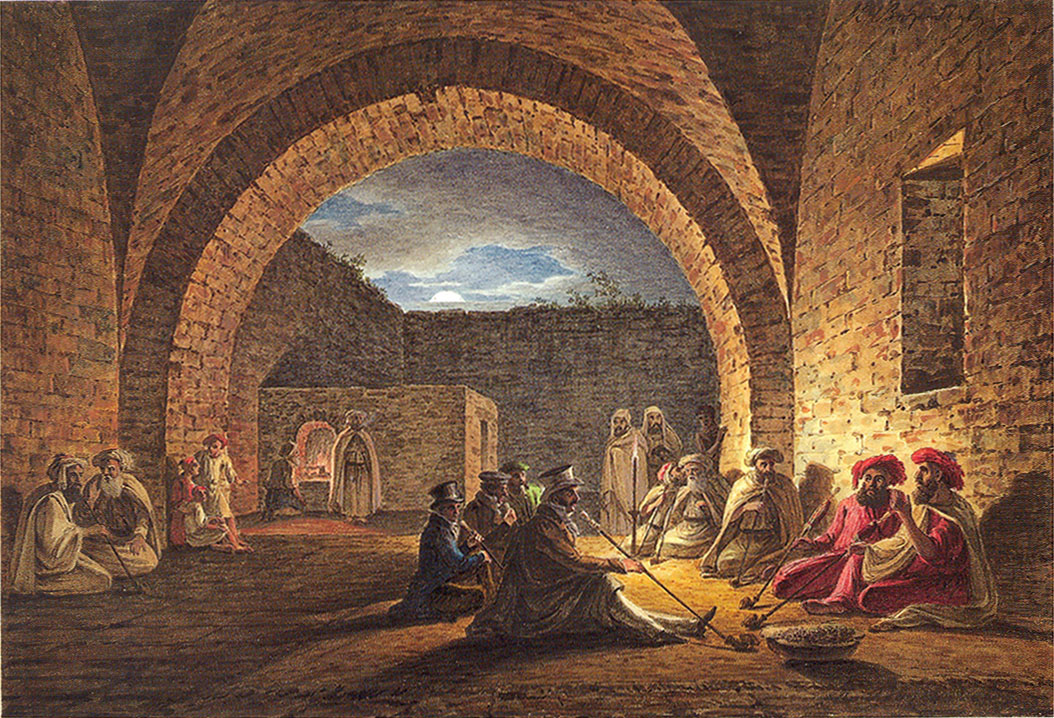
A Visit with
Two Arabian Sheikhs

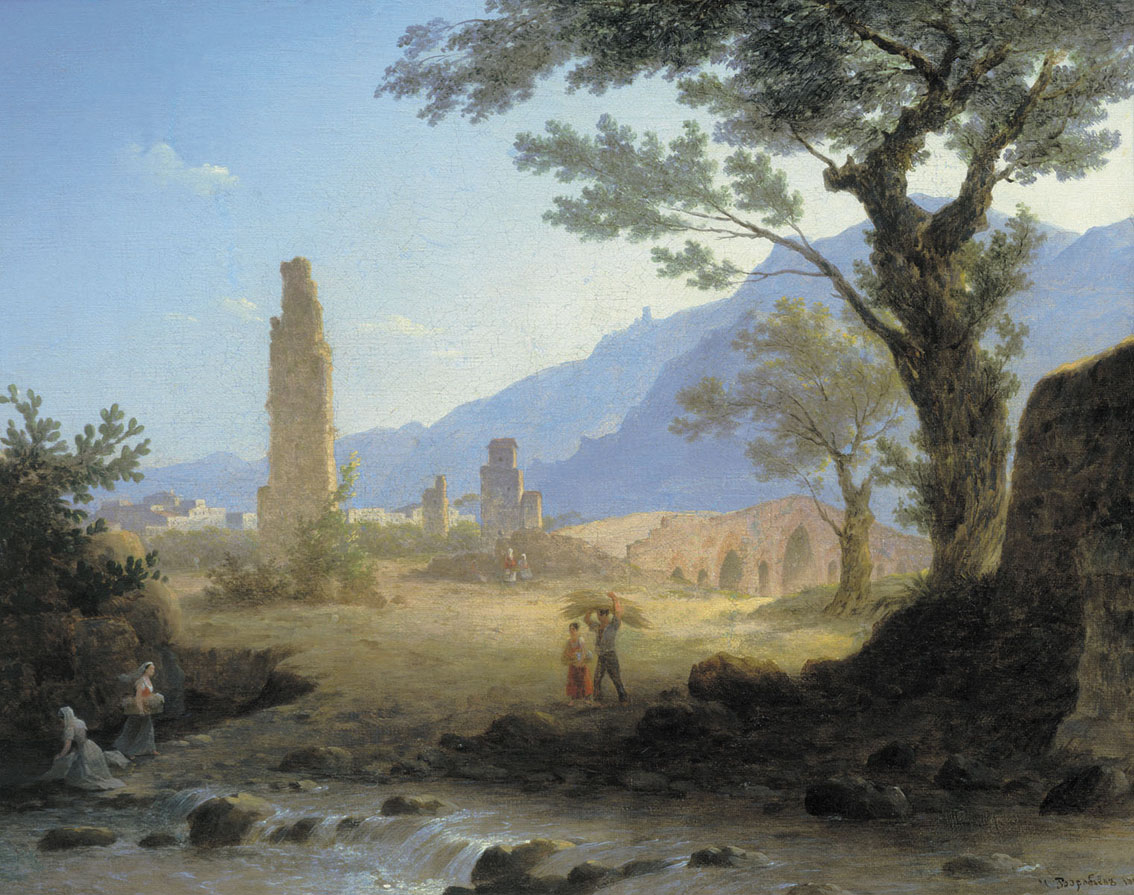
Italian Landscape

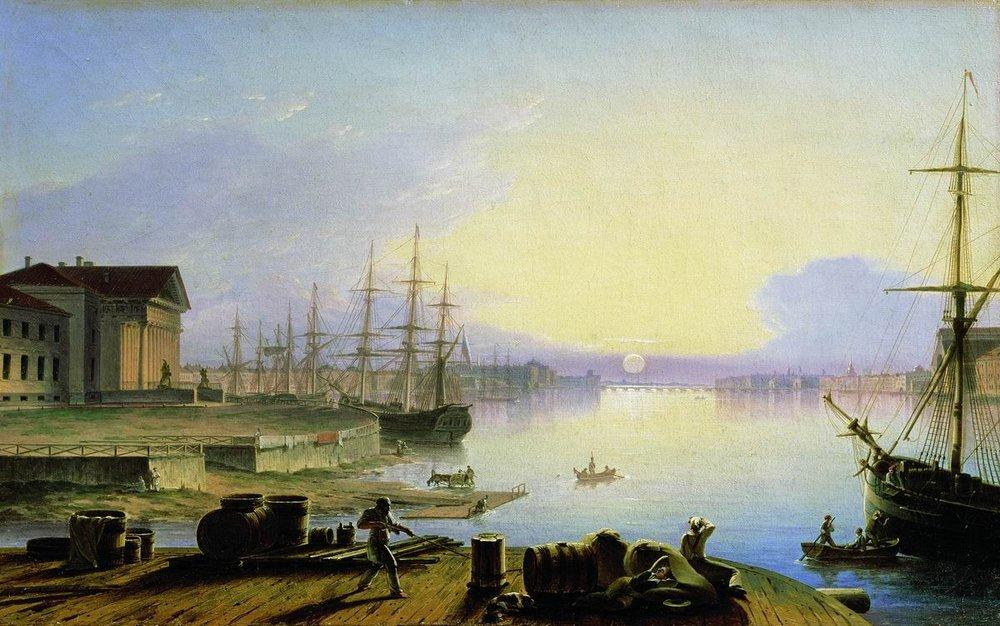
Sunrise Over the Neva

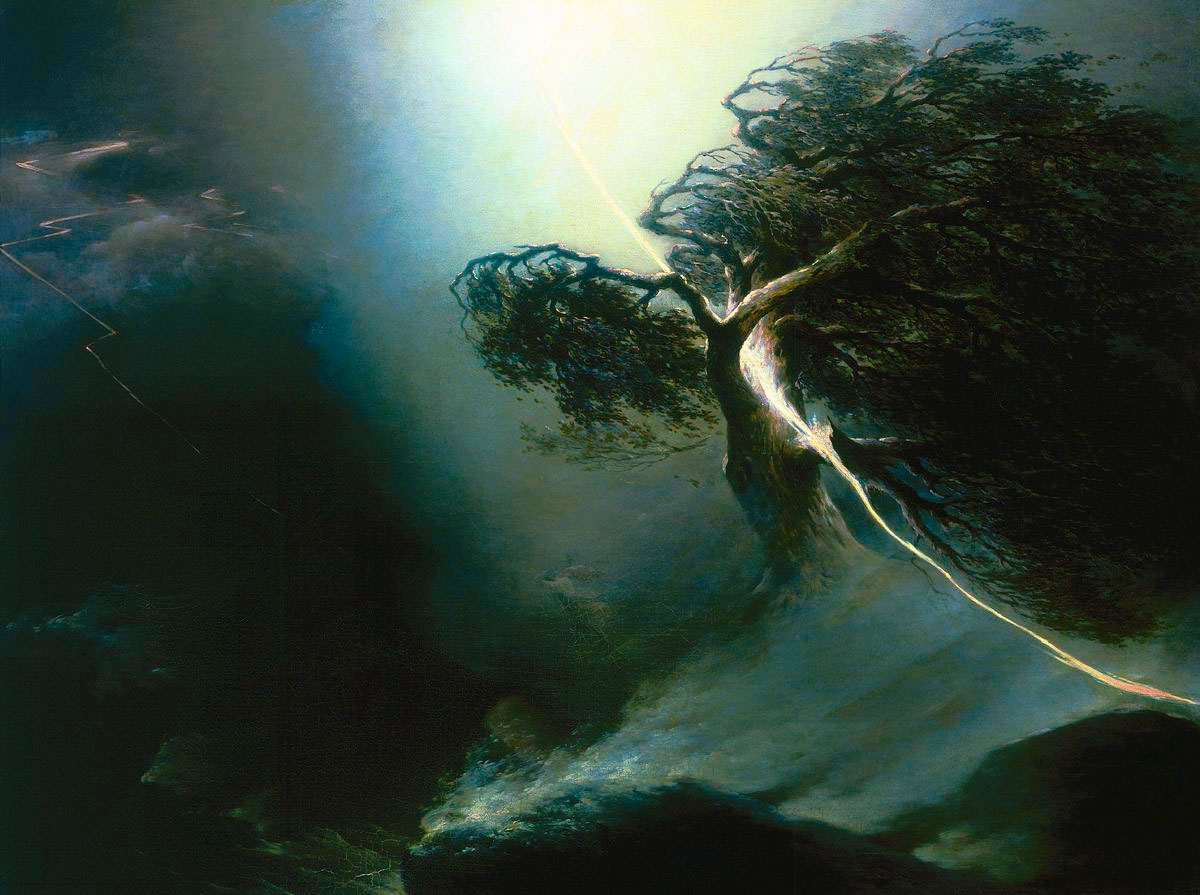
Oak Fractured by Lightning (an allegory on his wife's death)
