= Arseny Turbin =

Russian teenage political prisoner and anti-war activist

- Арсений Турбин
- Born: August 19, 2008 (age 17); Dubai, United Arab Emirates
- Known for: Anti-war activism, political imprisonment in Russia

Arseny Turbin (Russian: Арсений Турбин, born 19 August 2008) is a Russian teenager and political activist. He became internationally known in 2024 after being sentenced to five years in a juvenile correctional colony in Russia on charges of "participating in a terrorist organization." He is widely regarded by human rights groups and media as one of the youngest political prisoners in modern Russia.

== Early life ==
Turbin was born in Dubai, United Arab Emirates, to a Russian mother and Emirati father. He was raised in Livny, Oryol Oblast, Russia. He was an academically successful student at the Bulhakov Lyceum and aspired to attend MGIMO University. Reports suggest he was bullied for his mixed heritage.

== Activism ==
In 2023, Turbin began posting anti-war content on Telegram, including founding a channel called "Свободная Россия" ("Free Russia") and distributing anti-Putin leaflets. On 1 June 2023, he allegedly emailed the anti-Kremlin military group Freedom of Russia Legion offering to assist with spreading their message, though he later stated that he never completed or submitted their recruitment form.

== Arrest and prosecution ==
On 29 August 2023, Turbin’s home was raided by the FSB, and he was detained on 5 September 2023. He was initially placed under house arrest and later transferred to a pre-trial detention center. In June 2024, the 2nd Western District Military Court in Moscow sentenced him to five years in a juvenile correctional colony under Article 205.5 Part 2 of the Russian Criminal Code (participation in a terrorist organization). According to Mediazona and The Moscow Times, the prosecution’s evidence was allegedly manipulated, and the FSB misrepresented Turbin’s statements during interrogation.

Turbin was held at Moscow’s SIZO-5 (Vodnik), where he reported abuse by a cellmate and significant weight loss. In October 2024, he was placed in solitary confinement after a cell dispute and later transferred to a juvenile colony in Perm Krai.

In December 2025, according to his lawyer, a notebook was planted in his locker with A.U.E. writing. They claimed this was an attempt by the Russian authorities to bring a larger sentence, but that it failed and the prison began working on a new case.

On 21 February 2026, a support group advocating for Turbin reported that he was transferred to pre-trial detention, indicating a new criminal case. The defense stated that Turbin was charged with Article 212 - participating in mass riots, and could face 3 to 8 years for the new charge.

== Human rights designation ==
The human rights organization Memorial recognized Turbin as a political prisoner.

== See also ==
- Freedom of Russia Legion
- Human rights in Russia
