= Arsenie =

Arsenie is a male given name. It may refer to:

- Arsenie Boca (1910–1989), Romanian Orthodox monk, theologian and artist
- Arsenie Todiraș (born 1983), Moldovan singer and member of boyband O-Zone. Also a solo singer in Romania known by his mononym Arsenie or sometimes as Arsenium

== See also ==
- Arsenius (name)
- Arseniev or Arsenyev, a town in Primorsky Krai, Russia
