= Arsen (company) =

Arsen Cigars
- Industry: Tobacco
- Founded: 2010
- Headquarters: Miami, United States
- Area served: United States, Russia, Ukraine, Spain, Armenia
- Key people: Arsen Gasparian
- Website: arsencigars.com
- Footnotes / references Carcinogenicity: IARC group 1

In 2010, Arsen Cigars was launched by Arsen Gasparian, a former diplomat and journalist who came to the cigar industry originally as a publisher of the Russian Cigar Magazine, Hecho A Mano.

== History ==
Arsen was founded by Arsen Gasparian, who was once the press secretary for the Armenian Ministry of Foreign affairs and later the founder and publisher of the Russian magazine Hecho A Mano, began manufacturing cigars in 2010. Gasparyan is the CEO of Florida based Vitolier Company and also runs De Los Reyes Cigars, Inc. in Miami, Florida together with Carlos da Cruz, the son-in-law of race car driver Emerson Fittipaldi.

== Logotype ==
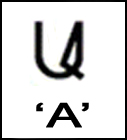
First Letter in Armenian alphabet

The Arsen trademark, according to the application filed with the United States Patent and Trademark Office, is a graphic representation of the first letter of the Armenian alphabet that transliterates in the Latin alphabet to "Ah".

== Arsen Conniosseur Collection ==
Gasparian released his Connoisseur Collection in June 2011, which is made in the Dominican Republic by Corporacion Cigar Export, and distributed in the United States by the Vitolier Co.

== Arsen Pink for Men ==
The Pink line of cigars are crafted from 100% Dominican tobacco and are rolled in a 3-year-old, shade-grown Habano Vuelta Abajo wrapper. They are aged for five months and come in four sizes.

== Models/Vitolas ==
Name	Model/Vitola	Length (in.)	Ring Gauge
Toro	toro	6.00	54
Robusto	robusto	5.00	50
Gordito	gordito	4.00	58
