= Gualterus Arsenius =

Flemish scientific instrument maker

Gualterus Arsenius (c. 1530 – c. 1580), also known as Gualterius Arsenius, Gautier Arsens, and Walter Arsenius, was a Flemish scientific instrument maker.

He was the nephew of the mathematician and cosmographer Gemma Frisius (1508–1555), and he worked in Louvain from 1555 to about 1570 (his presence there is still documented in 1579). The most prominent member of a family of scientific instrument makers, Arsenius produced exquisitely crafted and highly accurate devices such as armillary spheres, astrolabes, astronomical annuli (rings) and sundials, whose designs reveal the influence of his uncle and Gerard Mercator (1512–1594).
