= Arsenio Fernández de Mesa =

Spanish politician (born 1955)

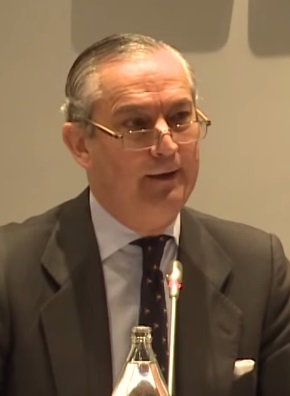
Arsenio Fernández de Mesa

Arsenio Fernández de Mesa (20 July 1955, Ferrol, Galicia, Spain) is a Spanish politician of People's Party.

== Trajectory ==
He was commercial delegate and inspector of paintings for ships in the Maritime Department of International Marine Coatings with headquarters in the port of Ferrol. He started his political career as councillor of Ferrol (1983-1991), he was deputy mayor of Ferrol (1987-1989). In the 1989 national elections. He was elected deputy in the Congress of Deputies for the province of A Coruña (1989-2000). He was a government delegate in Galicia (2000-2008) and during the Prestige disaster (2002) his work was heavily criticized by the opposition, Nunca Máis and ecologists. He was also elected as deputy for A Coruña in the elections of 2008 and 2011.

In December 2011 he was elected general director of the Civil Guard, until 18 November 2016. In February 2017 he was hired as adviser of the electric company Red Eléctrica de España which was criticized by some politicians and media as an example of revolving door.
