= Julius von Klever =

Russian painter (1850–1924)

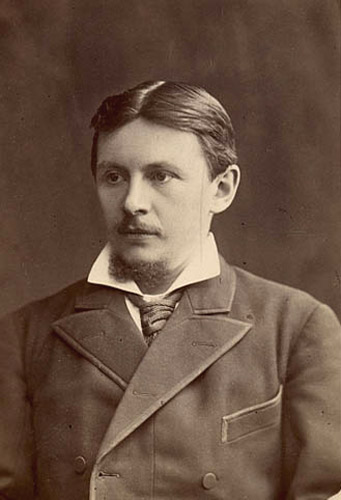
- Klever, before 1900
- Born: 31 January 1850; Dorpat, Governorate of Livonia, Russian Empire
- Died: 24 December 1924 (aged 74); Leningrad, Russian SFSR, Soviet Union
- Resting place: Smolensky Cemetery, St. Petersburg
- Education: Member Academy of Arts (1878); Professor by rank (1881)
- Alma mater: Imperial Academy of Arts (1876)
- Known for: Landscape painting
- Notable work: Winter Landscape (1883); Winter (1876)
- Movement: Romanticism

Julius Sergius von Klever, russified as Yuly Yulyevich Klever (31 January 1850 – 24 December 1924), was a Russian landscape painter of Baltic German descent.

== Biography ==
His father was a chemist who taught pharmacology at the Veterinary Institute. He displayed artistic talent at an early age and took lessons from Konstantin von Kügelgen. After completing his primary education, was enrolled at the Imperial Academy of Fine Arts where, at his father's insistence, he studied architecture. After a short time, however, he began to take landscape painting classes; first with Sokrat Vorobiev, then Mikhail Clodt.

In 1870, he was apparently expelled from the Academy, for unknown reasons. Undeterred, he started exhibiting his works. In 1871, one was purchased by Count Pavel Stroganov and, the following year, his painting "Sunset" was acquired by Grand Duchess Maria Nikolaevna. In 1874, he had his first solo exhibition at the Imperial Society for the Encouragement of the Arts. After Tsar Alexander II expressed interest in his work, he was named an "Artist" by the Academy, despite having not graduated. In 1878, he became an "Academician".

In 1879, he and the actor Vasily Samoylov (who was an amateur painter) spent some time working on Nargen island. The resulting works were purchased by Pavel Tretyakov and the Imperial Family, including Tsar Alexander III. Following this, the Academy named him a Professor. In 1885, he helped organize the Russian exhibit at the Exposition Universelle d'Anvers.

In the late 1890s, a friend of his from the Academy was implicated in a scandal involving gambling and embezzlement. He was drawn into it and suffered a nervous breakdown that forced him to give up painting temporarily. In 1908, he went to Germany with his family to avoid the situation and lived in Neustrelitz until 1915, when the war forced him to return home.

After the Revolution, he began receiving support from the "Society of Artists". For the rest of his life, he taught at the Academy (under its successive new Soviet names) and at the Art and Industry Academy, where he headed the department of "monumental" painting.

Three of his four children became painters; Maria (1878–1967) a theater artist, Julius (1882–1942) who taught at the Art and Industry Academy, and Oscar (1887–1975), a theater artist who also designed costumes.

== The artist's legacy ==
Von Klever's works are in the State Russian Museum, State Tretyakov Gallery, Odesa Fine Arts Museum, museums in Zaraisk, Barnaul, Vladimir, Volgograd, Kaluga, Kozmodemyansk, Kostroma, Krasnodar, Lipetsk, Veliky Novgorod, Sevastopol, Semey, Serpukhov, Stavropol, Syktyvkar, Tambov, Ulyanovsk, Almaty, Yerevan, Voronezh; in private collections.

The quick success of Von Klever gave him many orders. Sometimes creating a picture a day, Klever began to quickly brush over the underpainting, made by his assistants. This is how numerous works by "Von Klever and the Studio" appeared. The most famous of his collaborators was Prince Nikolai Obolensky. Count Muravyov was named among the successors of the Klever style in painting.

== Selected paintings ==
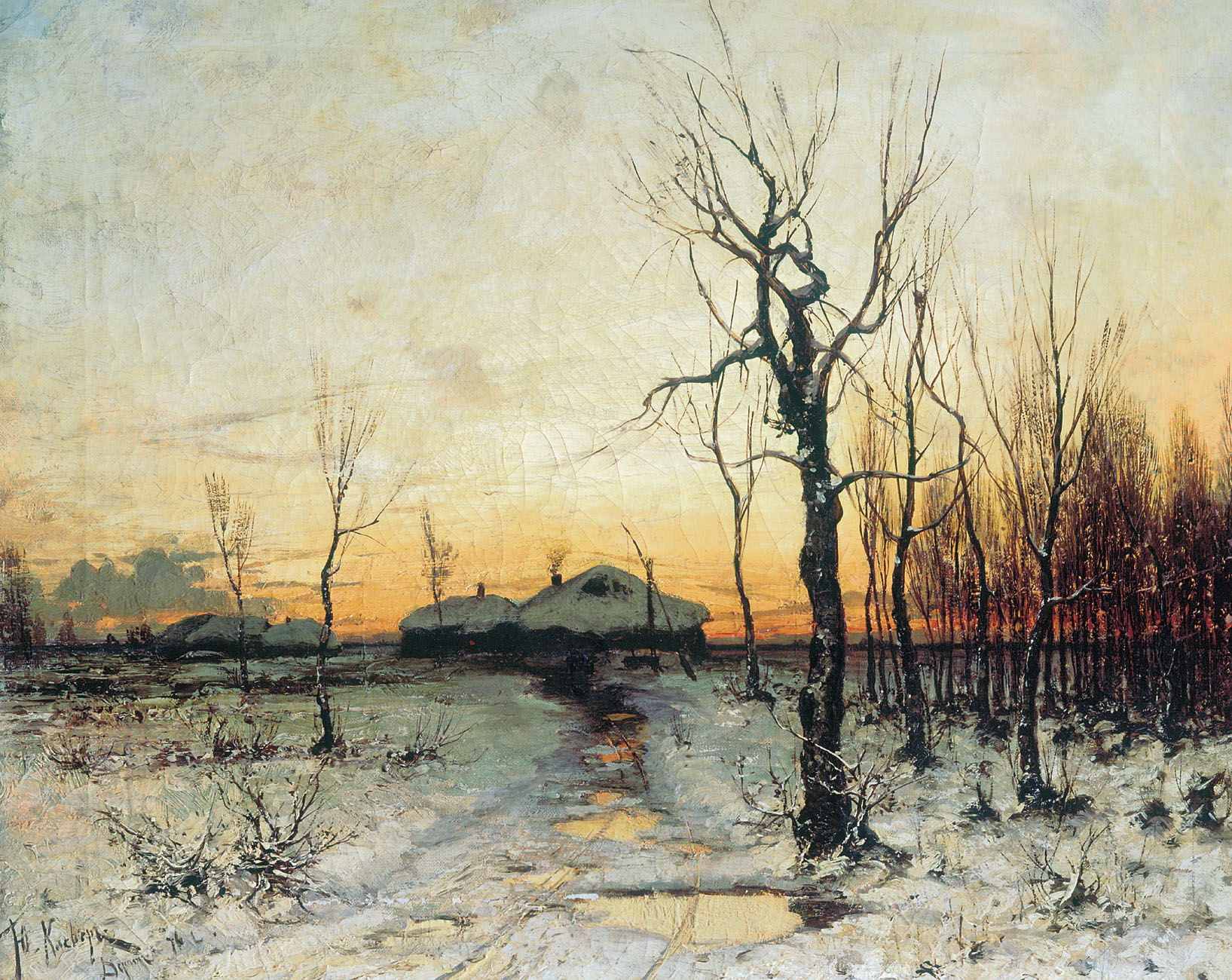
Winter

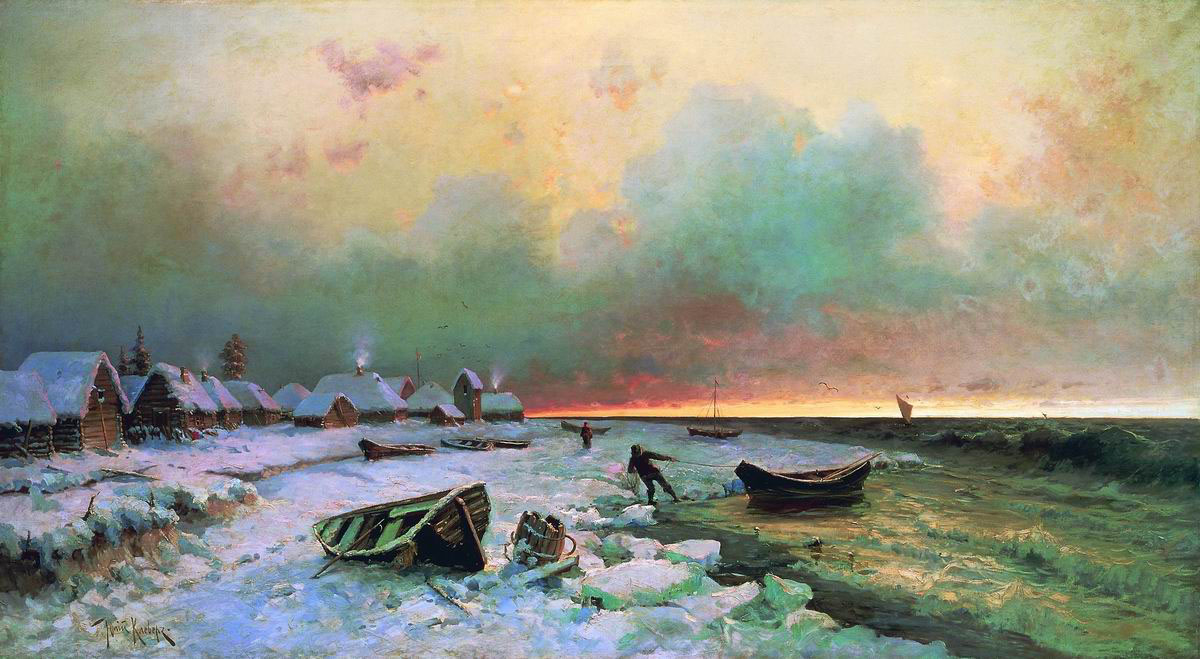
Village on Nargen

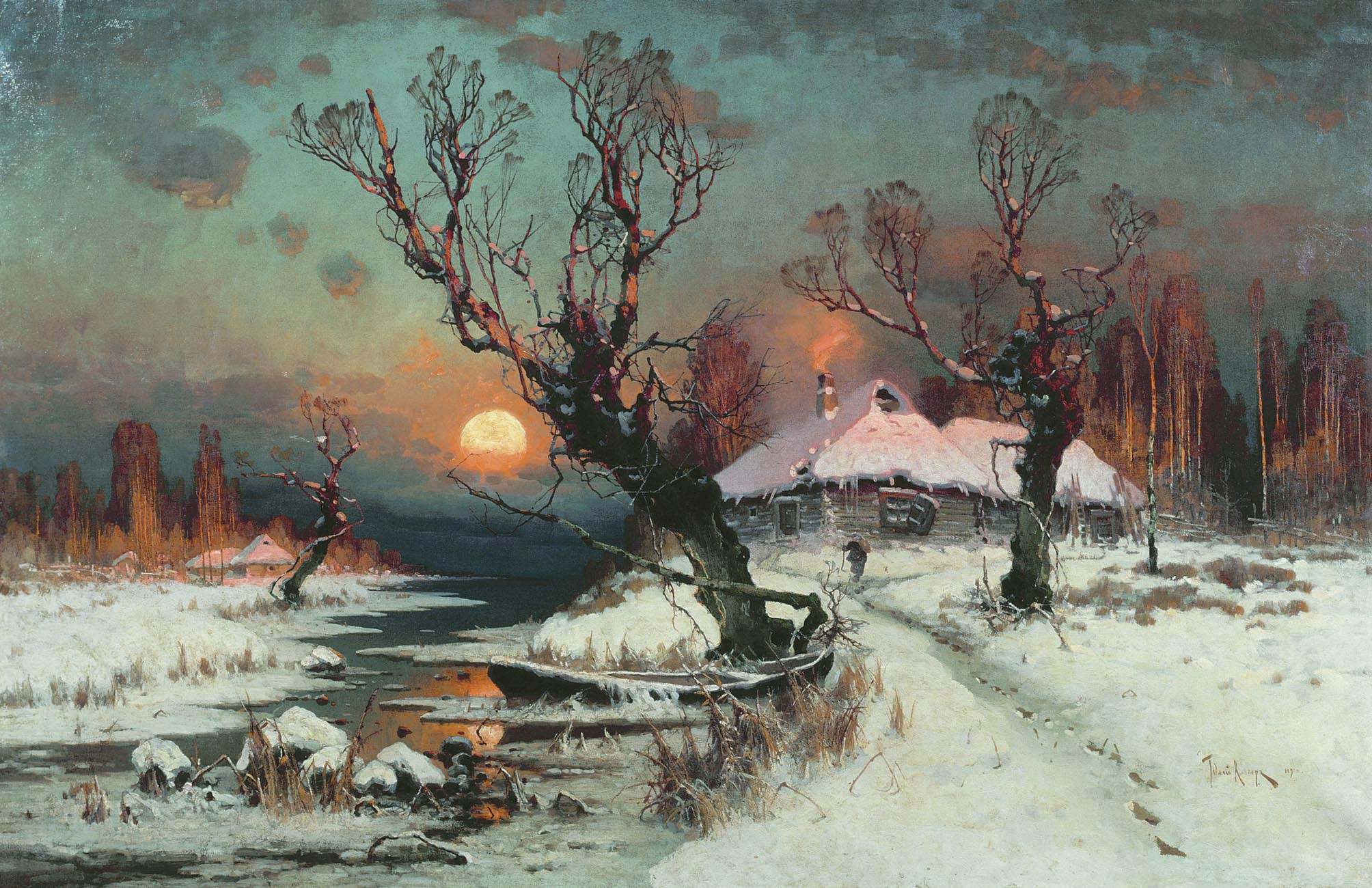
Sunset in the Winter

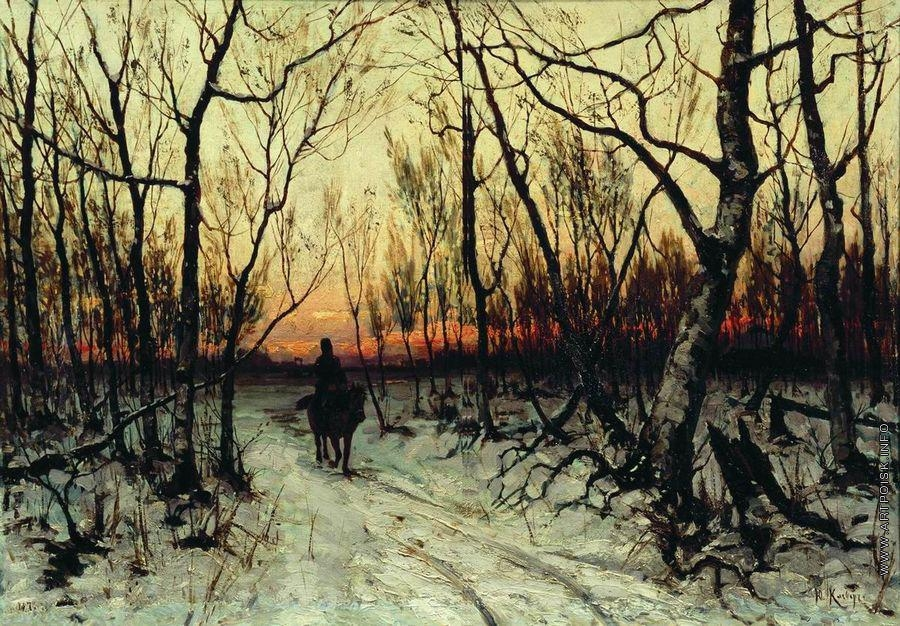
Evening

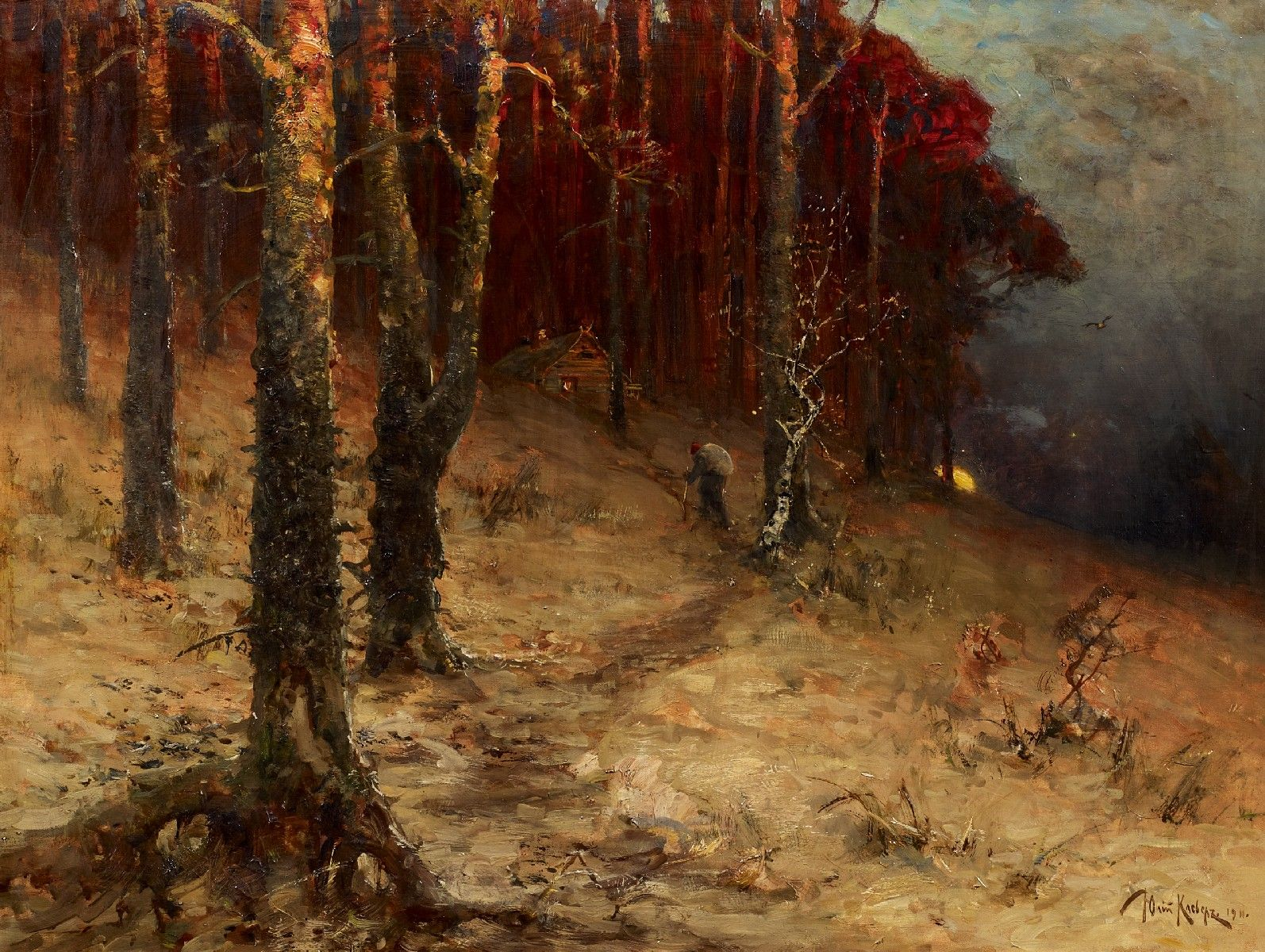
The Brushwood Collector

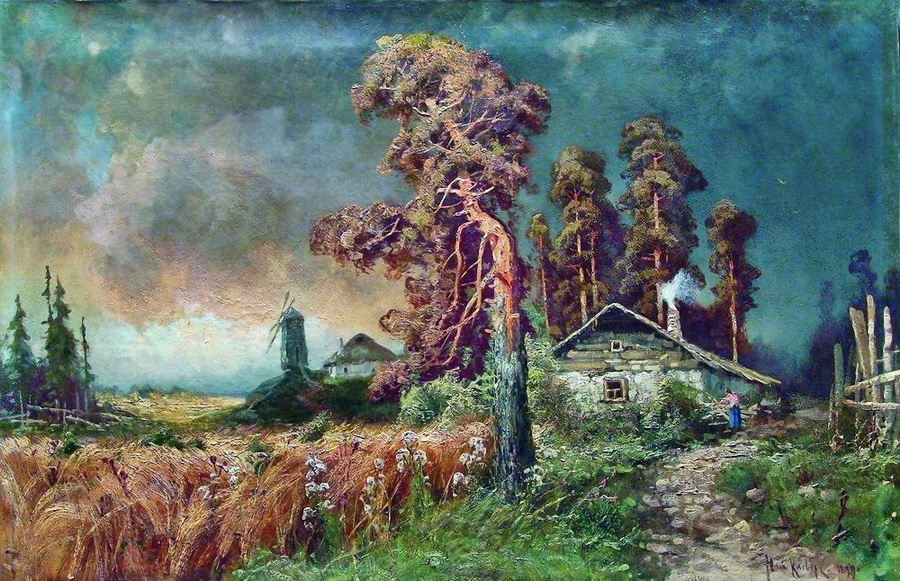
Before the Storm

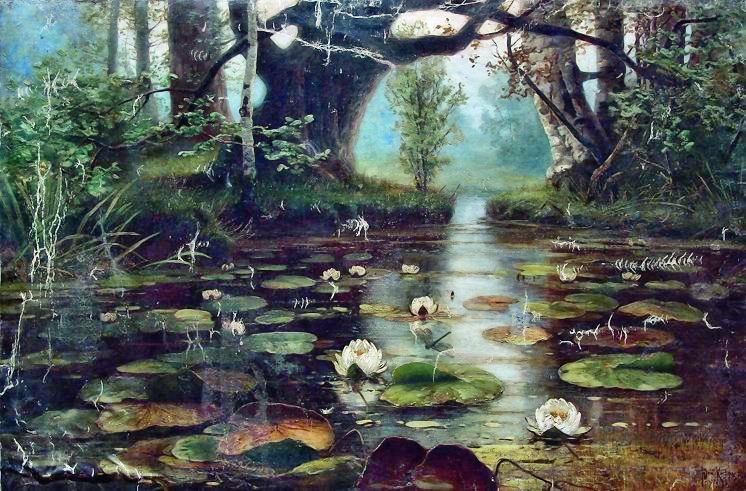
Pond with White Lilies

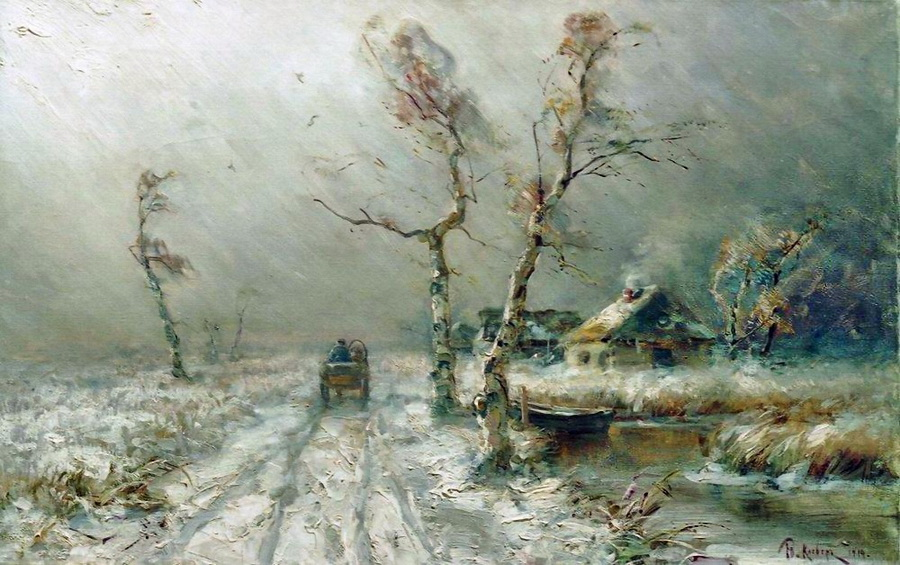
Approaching Blizzard

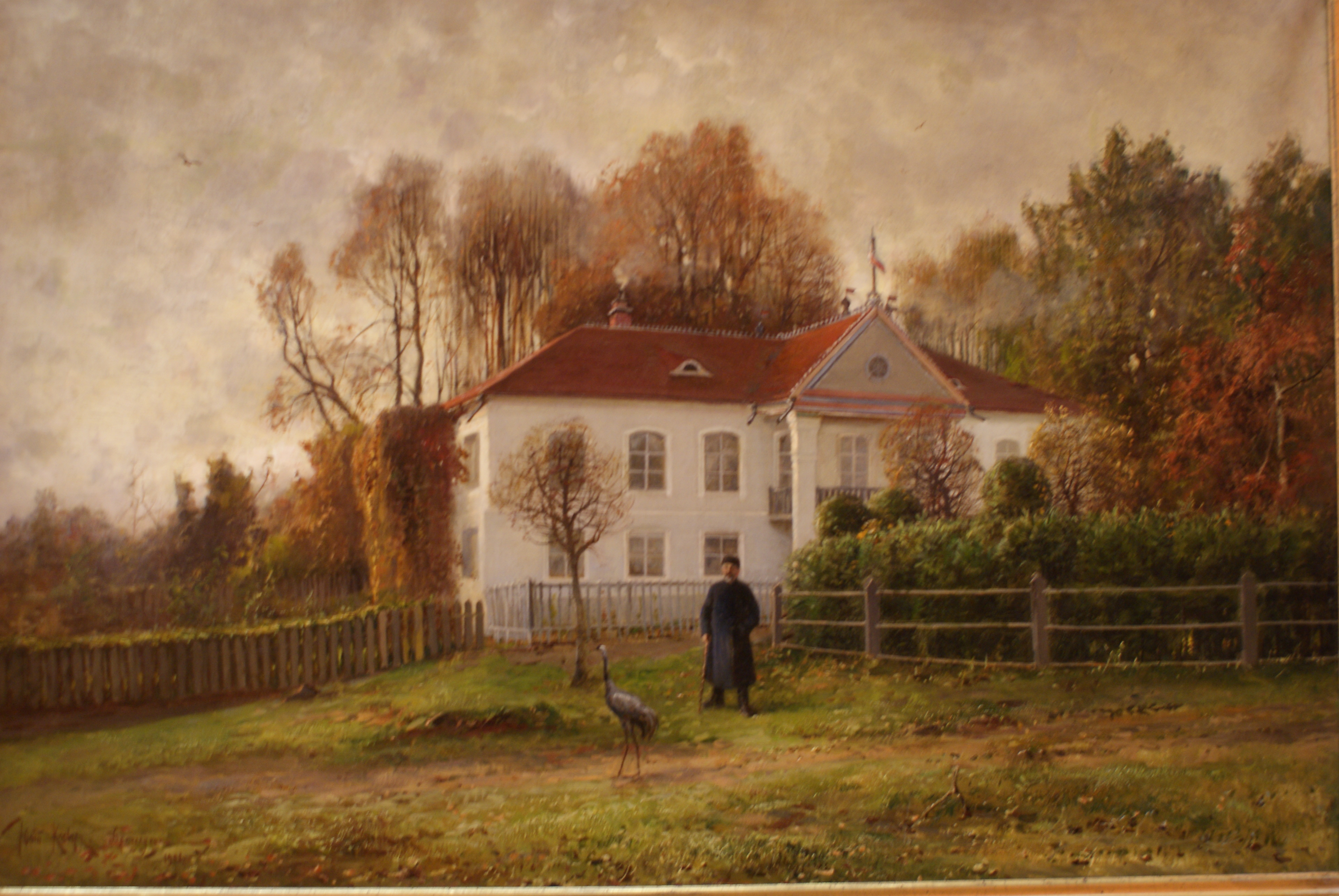
Drecheluki Country Estate

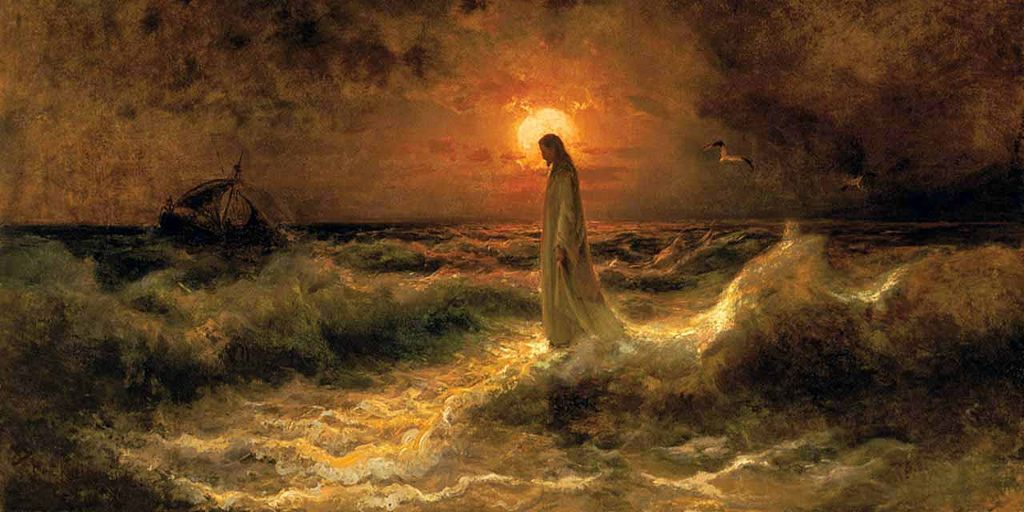
Christ Walking on the Waters
