= Arsenio Corsellas =

Spanish actor (1933–2019)

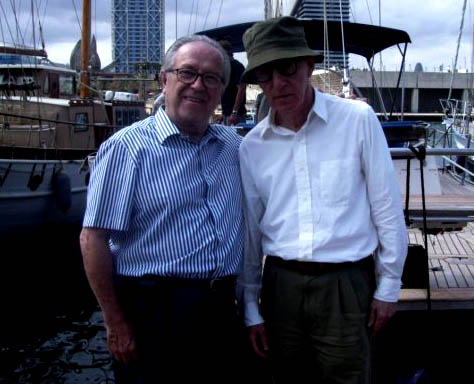
- Corsellas (left) with Woody Allen in 2007
- Born: Arsenio Corsellas Serra; 17 September 1933; Figueres, Spain
- Died: 17 November 2019 (aged 86); Madrid, Spain
- Occupation: Actor
- Height: 1.69 m (5 ft 6 1/2 in)
- Children: David Corsellas Ferrer

Arsenio Corsellas Serra (17 September 1933 – 17 November 2019) was a Spanish actor.

== Biography ==
He provided the Spanish dubbing for Sean Connery, Burt Lancaster, Nick Nolte, Kirk Douglas, Robert Shaw, Charlton Heston, Donald Sutherland, Richard Burton, Rock Hudson, and others.

He hosted Voz de España S. A. He dubbed George Lazenby in On Her Majesty's Secret Service (1969) and Sean Connery in Diamonds Are Forever (1971) and Never Say Never Again (1983). As an actor he appeared in Amor propio (1994) and Lo mejor que le puede pasar a un cruasán? (2003).

He was one of the foremost voice actors in Spain along with Constantino Romero. He also worked with Manuel Cano and Rosa Guiñón.

He died on 17 November 2019 in Madrid at the age of 86.

== Filmography ==
- The Aviators (2008) as McBomb
- Lo mejor que le puede pasar a un cruasán (2003) as El padre
- Amor propio (1994) as Presidente
- Despertaferro (1990) as Rocafort
- Els orígens d'un poble. Naixement de Catalunya
- Los últimos golpes de 'El Torete' (1980) as Rémy Julienne
- Destino: Estambul 68 (1967) as Jeff Gordon / Agent Z-55

=== TV series ===
- Marcelino, pan y vino (2001) as Jesus Christ
