= Arsenije =

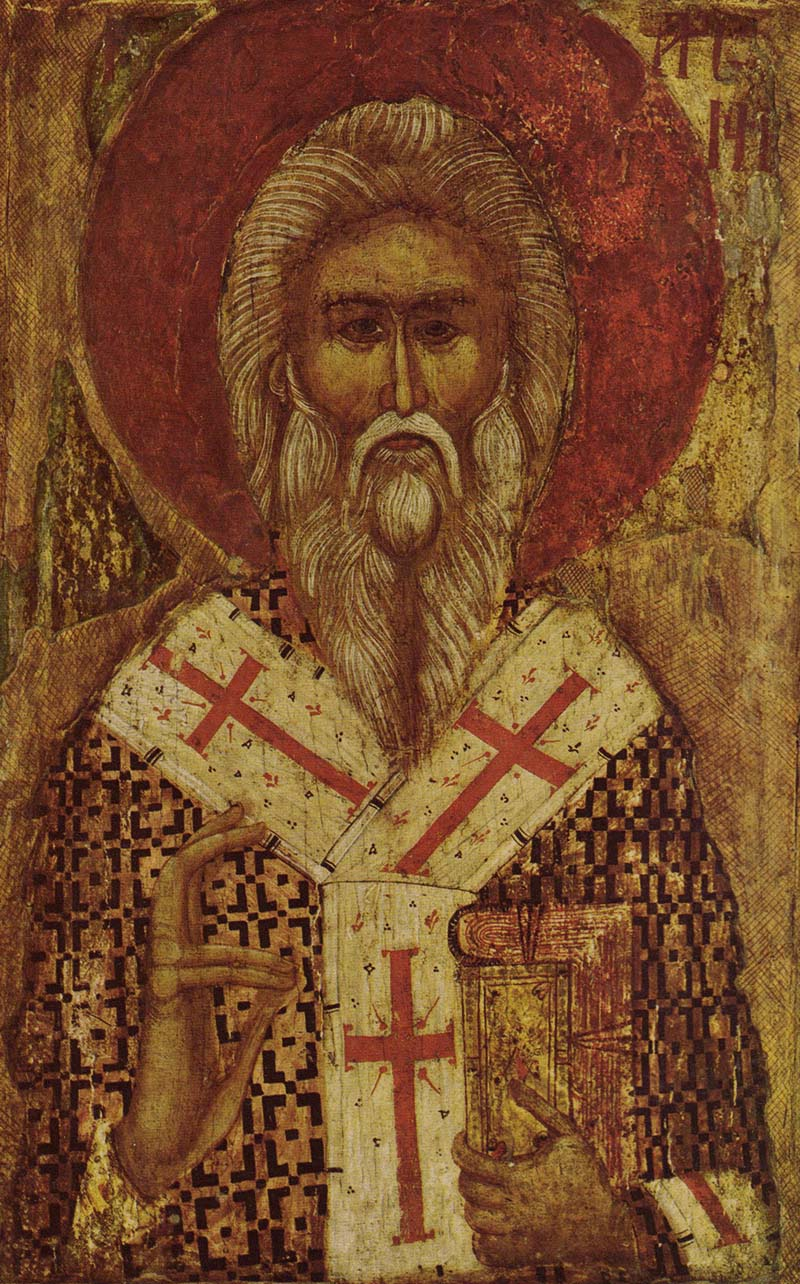
Arsenije Sremac, second Archbishop of the Serbian Orthodox Church

Arsenije (Serbian Cyrillic: Арсеније; Serbian pronunciation: [ǎrsɛːnijɛ]) is a Serbian given name, a variant of the Greek name Arsenios. Diminutives of the name include Arsen, Arsa and Arso. It may refer to:

- Arsenije Sremac (died 1266), second Archbishop of the Serbian Orthodox Church (1233–1263)
- Arsenije II, Archbishop of Peć and Serbian Patriarch from 1457 to 1463
- Arsenije III Čarnojević (1633–1706), Serbian Patriarch (1674–1706)
- Arsenije IV Jovanović Šakabenta (1698–1748), Serbian Patriarch (1725–1748)
- Arsenije Plamenac, Metropolitan of Cetinje (1781–1784)
- Arsenije Sečujac (1720–1814), Habsburg general
- Arsenije Loma (1778–1815), Serbian revolutionary
- Arsenije Milošević (1931–2006), Yugoslav and Serbian film and television director
- Arsenije Zlatanović (born 1989), Serbian tennis player
