= Vladimir Romanovich Arsenyev =

Vladimir Romanovich Arsenyev (Russian: Влади́мир Рома́нович Арсе́ньев) (7 August 1948, Leningrad - 30 October 2010, St. Petersburg) was a Russian Africanist, ethnographer, and exhibition curator noted for his research in Western Africa, and particularly of the Bambara; he was a foreign member of the French Académie des sciences d'outre-mer (Paris, 1999) and a member of the Scientific Council of the Russian Academy of Science for the Problems of African Countries (Moscow, 1999) as well as a member of the Société des Africanistes (Paris, 2004).

== Biography ==
Arsenyev was born into a family of doctors. In 1971, he graduated the Oriental department of Leningrad University. In 1971–1974, he served in Africa as a military translator; he was a student of D.A. Olderogge. He received his PhD from the Institute of Ethnography of the Soviet Academy in 1977. From 1977 to 2006 he worked in the Kunstkamera. Starting in 2006 he was a senior research fellow of its Centre for Political and Social Anthropology. He taught Africanist disciplines at the Oriental department of the Saint Petersburg State University. He participated in the field work in Mali in 1971–1974, 1980–1981, 1996–1997, 2002, 2005; and expeditions to Perm Oblast (1967–1970), Kuril Islands (1985).

== Works ==
- Арсеньев В.Р. Звери - боги - люди. М., 1991. - 160 с.
- Арсеньев В.Р. Альтернативы будущего. СПб., 1996. - 40 с.
- Арсеньев В.Р. Бамбара: люди в переходной экономике. СПб., 1997. - 260 с.
- Арсеньев В.Р. Бамбара: от образа жизни к образам мира и произведениям искусства: опыт этнографического музееведения. СПб., 2000. - 270 с.
- Арсеньев В.Р. Основные понятия этнософии. Les notions principales de l'Ethnosophie. Манифестация. Учебно-теоретический журнал "Ленинградской школы африканистики". No. 7a. СПб., 2006. - 94 с.
- Arseniev, Vladimir . 1999. Le musée d'Anthropologie et d'Ethnographie Pierre-le-Grand à Saint-Pétersbourg. Cahiers d'Études africaines 39, no. 155/156: 681–699.
- Arseniev, Vladimir. 2008. L’Afrique: une affection partagée. Quelques approches a la méthode et aux Expériences applicatives. SPb.- 180 P.
