= A.U.E. =

Russian criminal group employing children

AUE
- Founded: 2000
- Named after: Prof-convict's slogan and rule
- Founding location: Siberia, Zabaykalsky Krai (TransBaykal region), other parts of Russia
- Years active: 2011–present
- Territory: Educational and youth correction institutions, poor suburbs, poor villages
- Ethnicity: Predominantly Russian and other Russian Federation nationalities
- Membership: Mainly underage youth 12–17 years old
- Criminal activities: Theft, murder, mobbing, robbery, racketeering, extortion, protection racket, drug trafficking

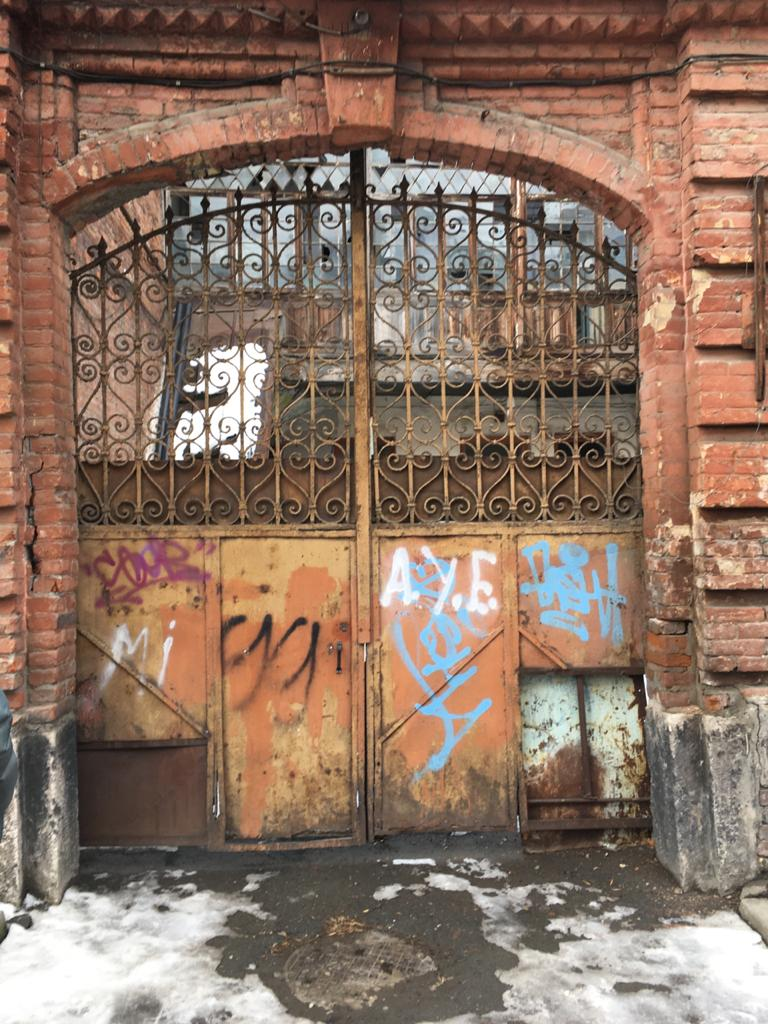

AUE (or A.U.E.; Russian: АУЕ, А.У.Е.) is an informal and vaguely-defined organization of Russian criminals, mainly consisting of children and teenagers, who are often indirectly ruled by adult criminals.

The acronym, transcribed from Russian: АУЕ or А.У.Е., comes from Арестантский уклад\устав един or Арестантское уркаганское единство. which can be translated into English as "Prisoner's Structure/Code is United" and "Prisoner's Criminal Unity".

The history of AUE started in 1980 but surfaced only in the 2010s.

On 17 August 2020, the Supreme Court of the Russian Federation ruled to recognize the movement as extremist.

== Timeline ==
In 2011, police identified a gang that operated in the village of Priiskovy, Nerchinsky District, Zabaykalsky Krai Territory. The gang included nearly two dozen people, who attacked a goods office. The raiders brutally beat the guard, but an alarm went off in the room and they had to escape. The watchman managed to identify one of the criminals, and the investigators found the remaining gang members. The gang included teenagers and young men from prosperous families aged 15 to 22 years. Gang members imposed thieves' ideas at their school and in elementary grades. According to the local newspaper, in each class had "watchers", who collected tribute from classmates in the "common fund". According to police, some of the funds from the "common fund" were transferred to gang members in a colony located on the territory of the village.

In 2013, in the city of Chita, Zabaykalsky Krai, mass riots broke out in professional/technical colleges (vocational colleges) number 6 and 14. A hostage situation was reported. Around 100 policemen took part in raids there; 30 youngsters (2 of them girls) were detained, and 1 million rubles worth of damage was reported. Authorities linked it with AUE influence.

In the Republic of Buryatiya, in the village Maliy Kunaley, the local parade on Victory Day (9 May) ended violently when a mass of people came close to the state foster house (the local orphanage). Three boys from this foster house (two of them who had prior criminal records, the other under current criminal investigation) started to throw stones at the policemen. Three police officers were injured.

AUE criminal activity was uncovered in December 2016 in the state military Guard cadet corps in the town of Usolye-Sibirskoye, Irkutsk region. One cadet charged with racketeering escaped, and asked a teacher for help; they both went to the police but corps managers denied the whole story. The teacher was later fired. The director of the corps, Igor Pimenov, previously worked as a prison director and employed 17 former convicts for work in the corps.

== Official reaction ==
The President Council for Civil Society Development and Human Rights has reported that AUE took control of educational institutions in 18 regions of Russia: Republic Buryatia, Moscow, Chelyabinsk, Ulyanovsk, and Tver regions, Zabaykalsky and Stavropol Krai.

In 2020, the movement was prohibited in Russia.

== See also ==
- Dedovshchina, from where the A.U.E.'s system of hierarchical domination is believed to originate
- Fagin, whose modus operandi resembles that of the A.U.E.
