= Arsen Aydinian =

Armenian linguist and grammarian (1825–1902)

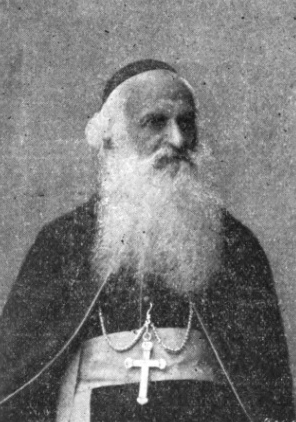
Arsen Aydinian

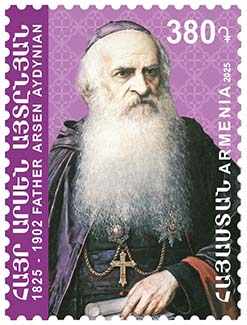
Arsen Aydinian on a 2025 stamp of Armenia

Arsen Aydinian (Armenian: Արսէն Այտընեան, born Istanbul, Ottoman Empire, January 19, 1825 – died Vienna, Austria, July 21, 1902) was an Armenian Catholic priest, linguist, grammarian, and master of ten languages.

== Work ==
Arsen Aydinian contributed immensely to Armenian linguistics and grammar. He was from the Viennese Mekhitarist Order, and spoke both classical and modern Armenian. He was Abbot General of the Viennese Mekhitarist Order. In 1887, he was the leading figure in the establishment of the official journal, Handes Amsorya, where he published many articles on linguistics. However, Aydinian’s biggest achievement was Knnakan kerakanutiwn ashkharhabar kam ardi hayeren lezvi (Critical grammar of the vernacular or modern Armenian language), published in 1866. It remains a highly important achievement in Armenian linguistics till this day. This book was especially significant due to the fact that the Armenian people at large were demanding the use of a more vernacular language in the literature and arts. This was a breakthrough since Classical Armenian was the language mainly associated with priesthood and high-ranked members of society.
