= Patriarch Gavrilo =

Patriarch Gavrilo (Serbian Cyrillic: Патријарх Гаврило) may refer to.

- Patriarch Gavrilo I, Serbian Patriarch (1648–1655)
- Patriarch Gavrilo II, Serbian Patriarch (1752)
- Patriarch Gavrilo III, Serbian Patriarch (1752–1755)
- Patriarch Gavrilo IV, Serbian Patriarch (1758)
- Patriarch Gavrilo V, Serbian Patriarch (1938–1950)

== See also ==
- Gavrilo
- Patriarch Arsenije (disambiguation)
