= Arsen Roulette =

Arsen Roulette | Arsen Giorgio
- Born: July 23, 1976; Fresno, California, US
- Genres: Rockabilly, rock and roll, Americana, blues, country
- Occupations: Singer-songwriter, Bespoke Shoemaker
- Instruments: Vocals, Lead and Rhythm Guitar, upright bass
- Years active: 1998–present
- Labels: El Toro Records / El Toro Music SGAE Doghouse and Bone / France RockNroll Ri¢H Records / California
- Website: arsenroulette.com

Arsen Giorgio Sheklian, better known by his stage name Arsen Roulette, (born July 23, 1976) is an American singer, lyricist, guitar player and upright bass player from Fresno, California. Roulette is a prolific songwriter penning more than 100 songs in the Rockabilly Genre, a mixture of Rock and Roll, Blues and American Hillbilly music. In 1996 Arsen discovered Rockabilly music and in 1997 Arsen formed the rockabilly trio "Arsen Roulette and the Ricochets", the bands rotating members were a veritable whose who of neo-rockabilly giants. After several name changes and a successful U.S. tour, the trio grew into a quartet of semi-permanent musicians, mainly European Rock-A-Billy musicians who play full-time in other bands of this genre. Arsen Roulette makes bi-annual pilgrimages to Europe, frequently headlining Europe's biggest Rockabilly events; Summer Jamboree, Hemsby, Screamin' Festival, Brighton Rumble, Sjock and Turnhout just to name a few.

Currently, Arsen is playing as Arsen Giorgio and continues to tour all over the world.

== Discography ==
=== Studio albums ===
- The Lost Recordings (CD, 2005)
- Let's Get on With It (CD, 2006)
- Knock Me A Kiss (CD, vinyl, 2007)
- LIVE in MONO-PHONIC (CD, vinyl, 2008)
- Dear You (CD 2011)
- Hit, Git Split (vinyl 2014)
- 20,000 Leagues Under The Sea (Vinyl 2019)
- Best Dressed Beggar (2024)

=== Compilations ===
- Viva Las Vegas 7 (CD, 2004)
- Viva Las Vegas 9 (CD, 2006)
- Lost & Found: Rockabilly And Jump Blues (CD, 2007)

=== B-Sides ===
- "Honey Hush" (CD, 2007)
- "Mamma Voglio L'uvo a la Coque" (CD, 2011)
- "La Piu' Bella Del Mondo" (CD, 2011)

== Filmography ==
- Strolling Back to You (Music video – Let's Get On With It)
- Down the Line (Music video – Beauty 24)
- Beauty 24 – Full-length documentary
