= Arseny Meshchersky =

Russian painter

- Арсений Иванович Мещерский
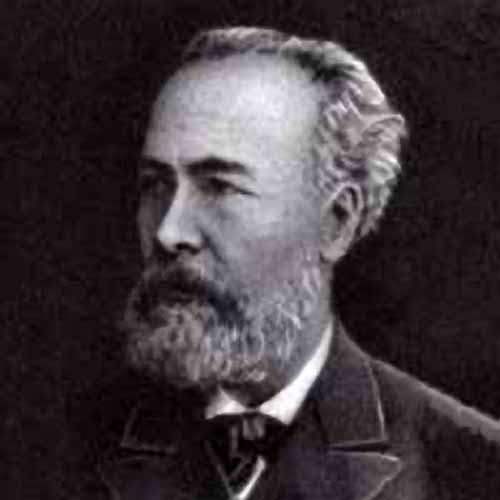
- Arseny Meshchersky
- Born: 1834; Tver Governorate
- Died: November 26, 1902 (aged 67–68); Saint Petersburg
- Education: Member Academy of Arts (1864); Professor by rank (1876)
- Alma mater: Imperial Academy of Arts
- Known for: Painting
- Awards: Big Gold Medal of the Imperial Academy of Arts (1859)

Arseny Ivanovich Meshchersky (Russian: Арсе́ний Ива́нович Меще́рский; 1834 – 13 November 1902) was a Russian landscape painter.

== Biography ==
Arseny was the son of a peasant. By 1854, when he was only twenty, he appears to have received a thorough artistic training. At that time, he was enrolled at the Imperial Academy of Arts where he studied with Fyodor Bruni, Sokrat Vorobiev and Timofey Neff. The following year, he participated in his first academic exhibition.

Then suddenly, in 1857, he dropped out of the academy and moved to Switzerland (at his own expense or that of a patron) to improve his painting skills by studying with the landscape painter Alexander Kalam (1810-1864). Two years later, he exhibited at the academy, winning a gold medal, the title of Artist First-Class and a stipend that allowed him to travel at government expense. In 1864 he returned home, although he continued to travel extensively and, three years later, he was chosen to be part of the entourage accompanying Grand Duke Alexei Alexandrovich on his voyage around the world. In 1876, he was named a Professor at the academy.

In 1879, he became ill with pneumonia and developed complications, hovering close to death for almost two months. He recovered, but suffered from breathing difficulties for the rest of his life, especially in the winter.

In 1886, he was awarded the Order of St. Anna, Third Degree. He once again began to travel, visiting Turkey, Greece, Italy and Switzerland over the course of the next twelve years.

In mid-November 1902, the newspaper Новое время (New Times) published an obituary (between advertisements for soap and gloves) noting that "Arseny Meshchersky, Professor of landscape painting, who once enjoyed great popularity...", had died from an attack of "asthma".

== Selected paintings ==
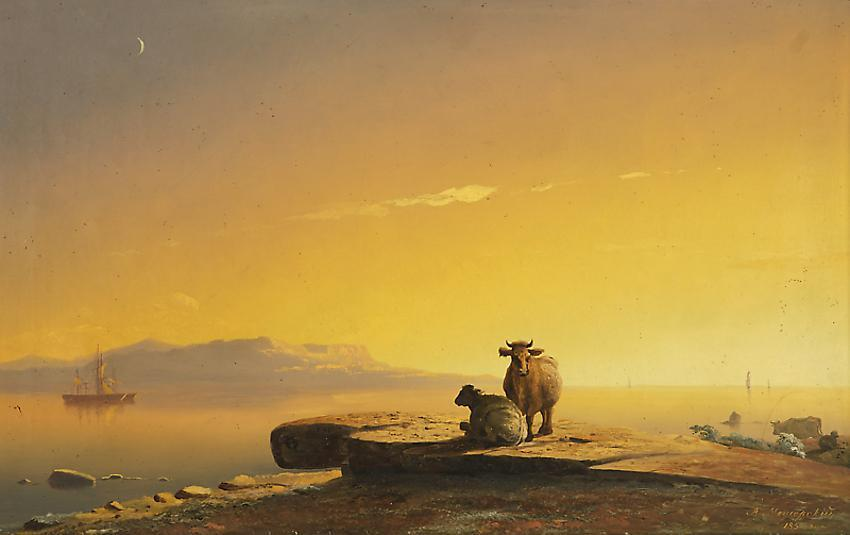
Evening (1857)

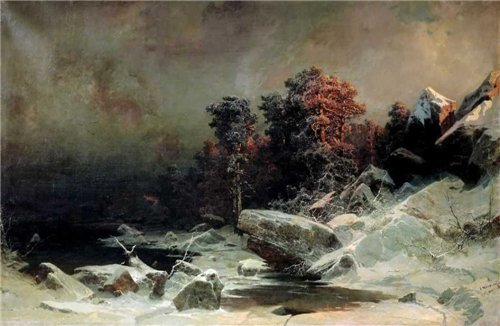
Winter evening in Finland (1866)

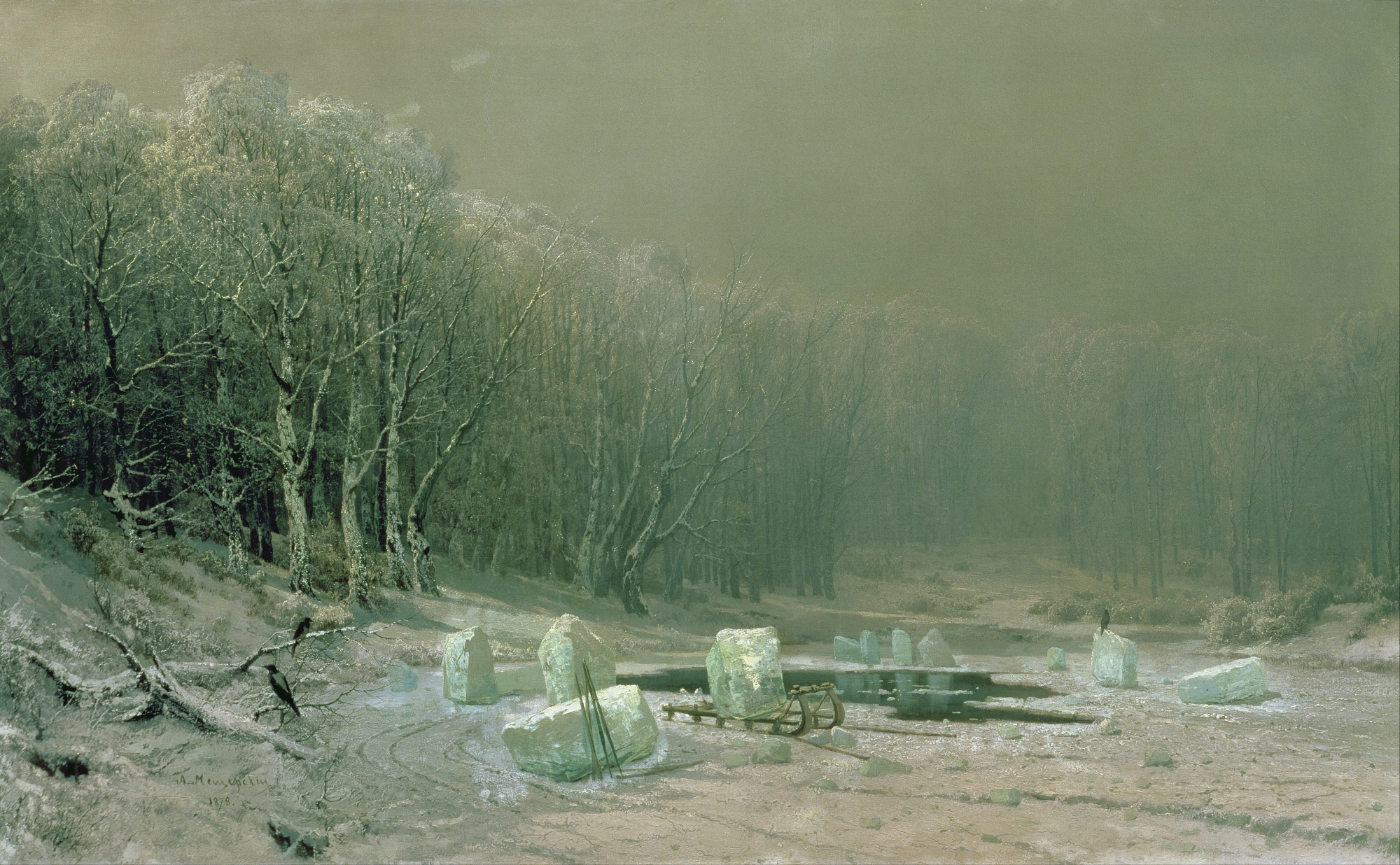
Winter. Ice break (1878)

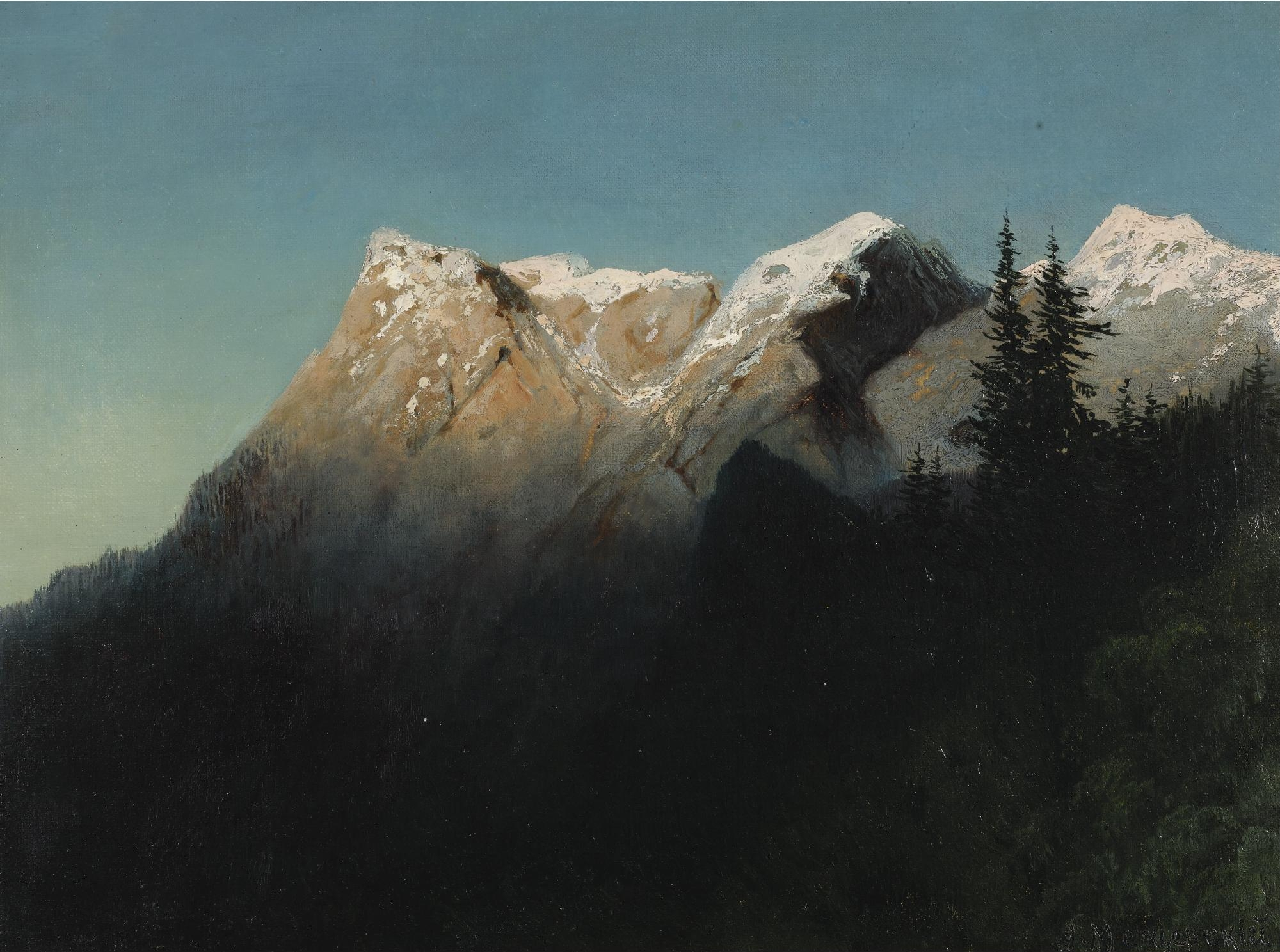
Mountain peaks in the snow (1878)

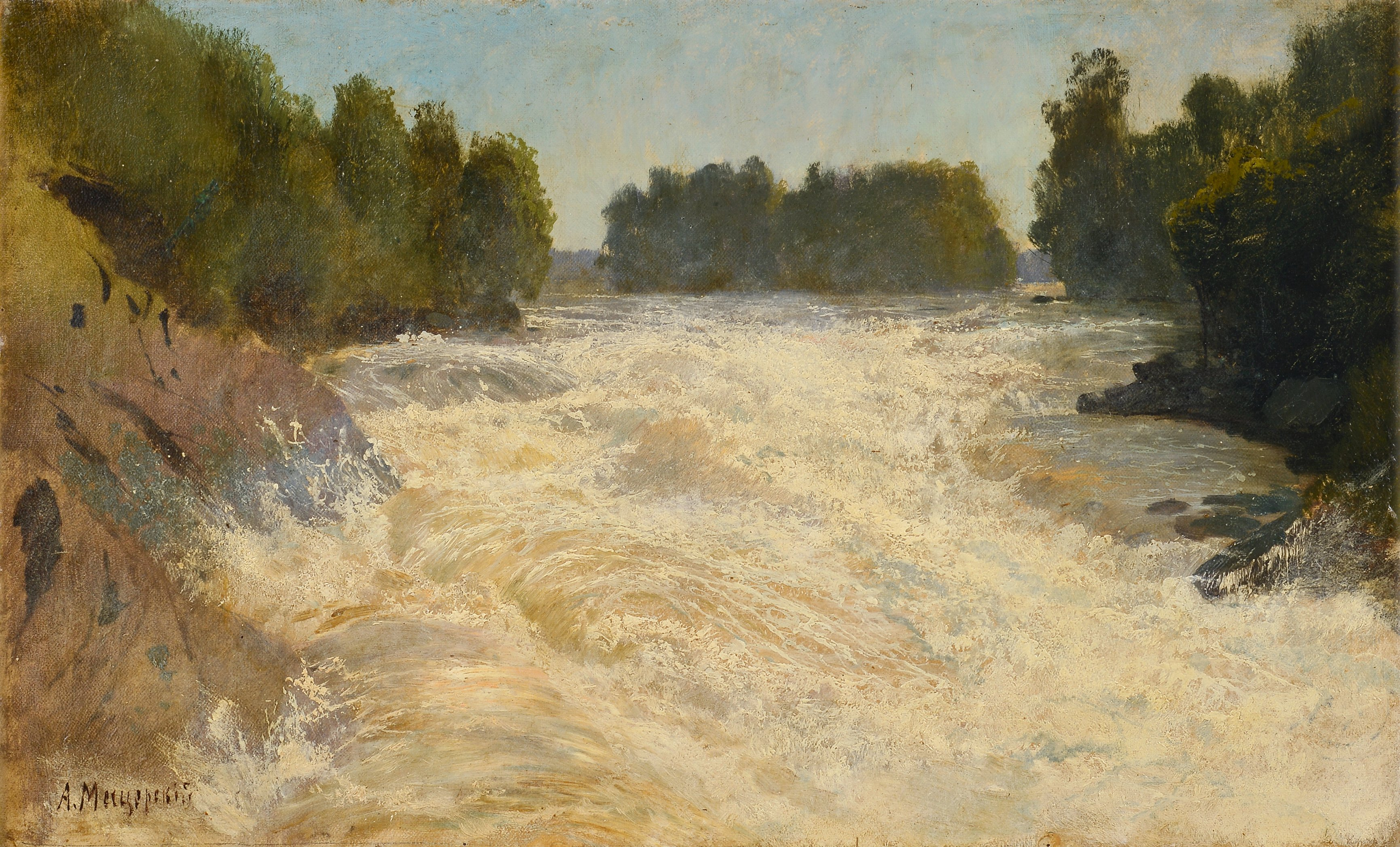
Rapids (1886)
