= Arsène Trouvé =

French painter

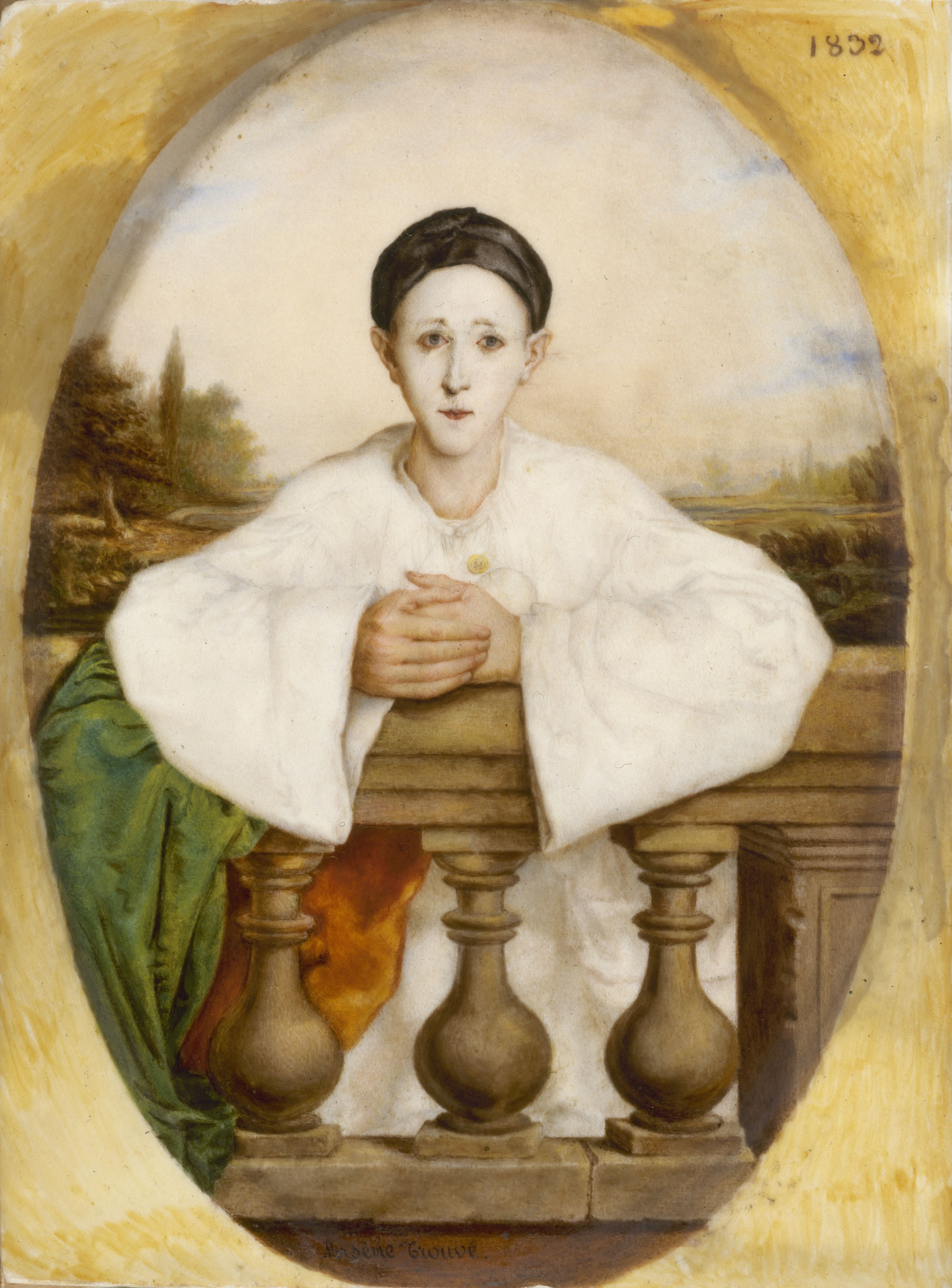
Portrait of Jean-Gaspard Deburau, porcelain painting by Arsène Trouvé after Auguste Bouquet, 1832 (Paris, musée Carnavalet)

Arsène Trouvé was a French painter, active during the nineteenth century.

Little is known of Trouvé's life or career, save that she specialized in paintings on porcelain and that she lived at 43, rue Hauteville, in what would later become the 10th arrondissement of Paris. In 1831 she showed a Portrait of Elizabeth of France, after Peter Paul Rubens, at the Salon of 1831. She participated in the Salons of 1833, 1834, and 1835 as well, showing more copies of oil paintings at each. In 1834 she also exhibited a watercolor of a vegetable seller, which may have been an original piece. Her best-known work is a portrait of Jean-Gaspard Deburau after an original by Auguste Bouquet. Exhibited at the Salon of 1835, today it is in the collections of the Carnavalet Museum.
