= Arso =

Arso or ARSO may refer to:

- Arso Jovanović (1907–1948), Yugoslav partisan general during World War II
- Arso Airport, in Papua, Indonesia
- Arso language, spoken in Papua, Indonesia
- African Organization for Standardisation
- Slovenian Environment Agency (Slovene: Agencija Republike Slovenije za okolje)
