= Arsenije II =

Serbian Patriarch

- Archbishop of Peć and Serbian Patriarch
- Church: Serbian Patriarchate of Peć
- See: Patriarchal Monastery of Peć
- Installed: 1457
- Term ended: 1463
- Predecessor: Nikodim II
- Successor: Makarije I

Personal details
- Denomination: Eastern Orthodoxy

Arsenije II (Serbian Cyrillic: Арсеније II) was the Patriarch of the Serbian Patriarchate of Peć from 1457 to 1463.

Arsenije was the primate of the Serbian Patriarchate of Peć and the last known Serbian Patriarch of the medieval era. During his tenure, the Ottoman Turks conquered the Serbian capital city of Smederevo in 1459, destroying the Serbian Despotate. After his death in 1463, a new patriarch was not elected and the Serbian Patriarchate of Peć entered a period of prolonged sede vacante.

== See also ==
- List of heads of the Serbian Orthodox Church

Eastern Orthodox Church titles
| Preceded by Nikodim II | Serbian Patriarch; 1457–1463 | Vacant Title next held by Makarije I |

== Sources ==
- Fotić, Aleksandar (2008). "Serbian Orthodox Church". Encyclopedia of the Ottoman Empire. New York: Infobase Publishing. pp. 519–520. ISBN 9781438110257.
- Ćirković, Sima (2004). The Serbs. Malden: Blackwell Publishing. ISBN 9781405142915.
- Слијепчевић, Ђоко М. (1962). Историја Српске православне цркве (History of the Serbian Orthodox Church). Vol. књ. 1. Минхен: Искра.
- Вуковић, Сава (1996). Српски јерарси од деветог до двадесетог века (Serbian Hierarchs from the 9th to the 20th Century). Београд: Евро.
