= Pauline Couriard =

Russian painter (1848–1898)

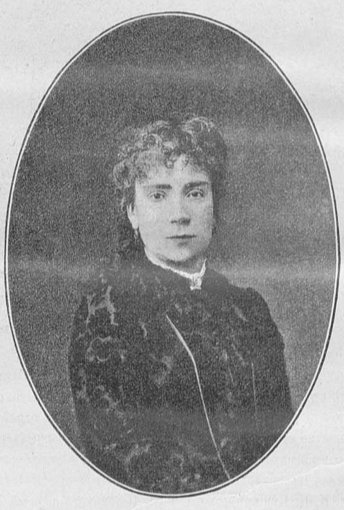
- Born: Pelageia Petrovna Vokhina; 1848; Saint Petersburg, Russian Empire
- Died: 1898 (aged 49–50); Saint Petersburg, Russian Empire
- Known for: Artist
- Awards: 2 silver medals from Imperial Academy of Arts

Pauline Couriard (born Petrovna Vokhina; 1848 – 1898) was a Russian painter, an honorary member of the Imperial Academy of Arts. She is best known for founding and chairing the First Ladies Art Circle in Saint Petersburg. She exhibited her artworks throughout Europe.

== Life and work ==
Pelageia Vokhina was born in 1848, in Saint Petersburg in an old nobility family. Her father, Piotr Vokhin, was a general in the Russian army. She was educated under the guidance of a popular artist Lev Lagorio. She exhibited for the first time at the age of 28 and it was a success.

Vokhina married Swiss doctor Alfred Couriard, who worked in Mariinski hospital in Saint Petersburg and took his family name. Several years preceding her husband's death Couriard was living in Geneve. She exhibited her landscapes at the Imperial Academy of Arts, where she received 2 silver medals, and in 1882 was recognized as an honorary member of the Imperial Academy of Arts.

In 1882, Couriard returned to Saint Petersburg. The same year she founded the First Ladies Art Circle aimed to facilitate women's access to the courses provided by the Academy of Fine Arts. She chaired the First Ladies Art Circle for more than ten years. In 1892, on the occasion of tenth anniversary of the First Ladies Art Circle Couriard received a series of drawings as a gift from the members of the Circle. Geneve museum bequested these drawings in 1899. The drawings donated by Pauline Couriard were featured in the exhibition Russian painters and travelers of 19th century at the Museum of Art and History in Geneva in 2008–2009.

Pauline Couriard died in 1898, aged 49 or 50, in Saint Petersburg.

== Examples of works ==
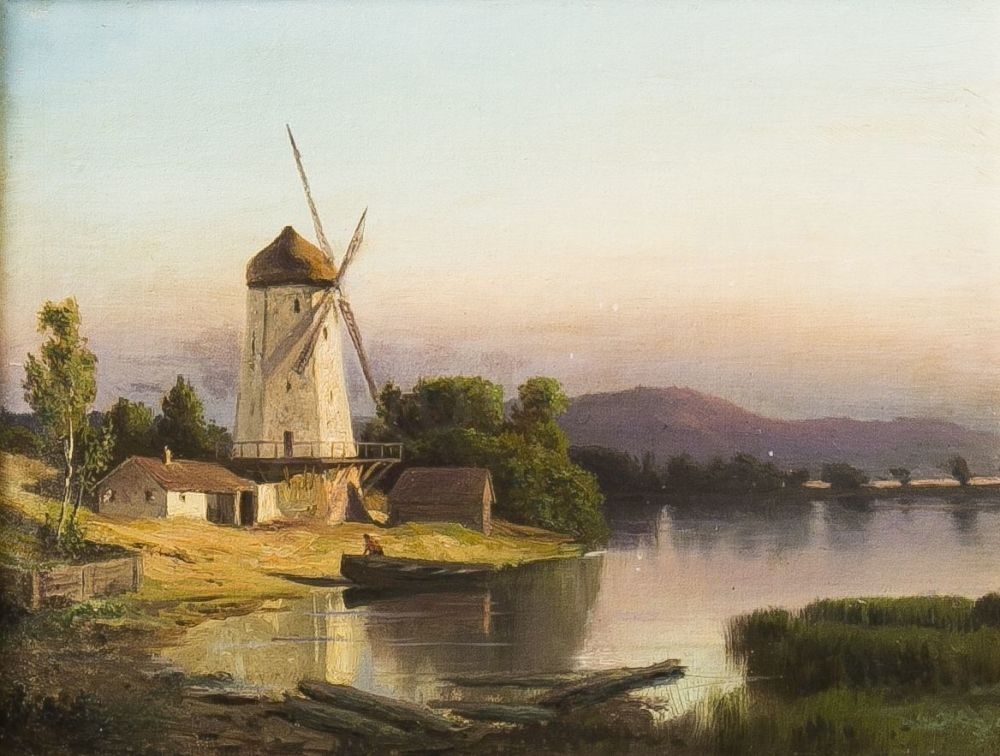
Windmill, c.1880

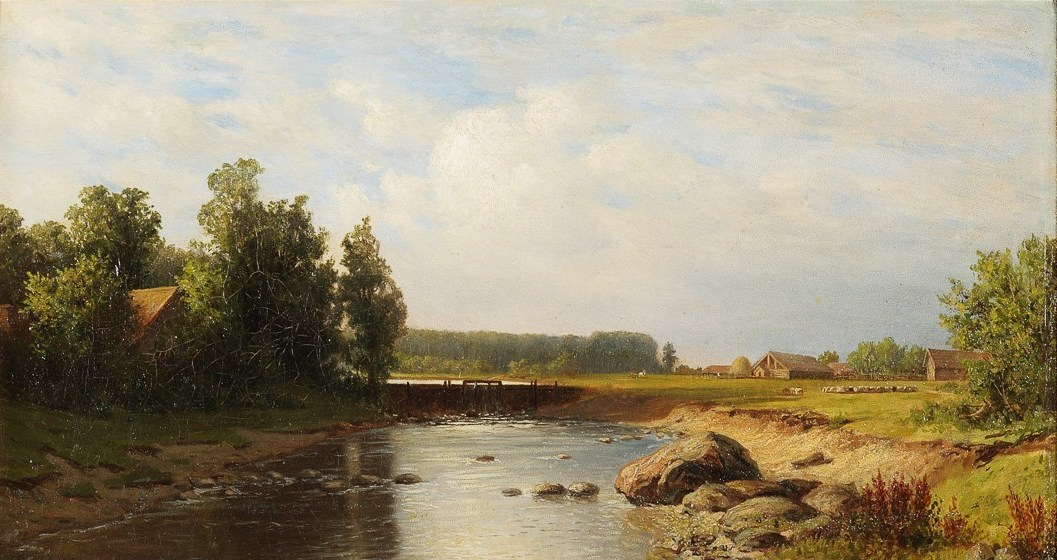
Summer landscape, c.1884

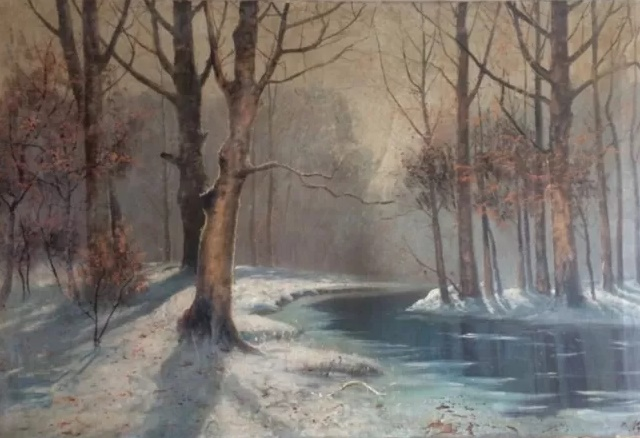
Wintry landscape, c.1875
