= Perring =

Perring is a surname. Notable people with the surname include:

- Christian Perring (born 1962), American philosopher
- George Perring (1884–1960), American baseball player
- James Ernest Perring (1822–1889), British opera singer, voice trainer and composer
- John Perring (disambiguation), multiple people
- William Perring (1866–1937), British politician

== See also ==
- Perring baronets, two British baronetcies
