= Gerring =

Gerring is a surname. Notable people with the surname include:

- Cathy Gerring (born 1961), American golfer
- Gunnar Gerring (1916–2009), Swedish diplomat
- Liz Gerring, American choreographer

== See also ==
- Gerling (surname)
- Herring (surname)
- Perring
