= Apolinary Horawski =

Belarusian-born painter of XIX century

- Аполлинарий Горавский
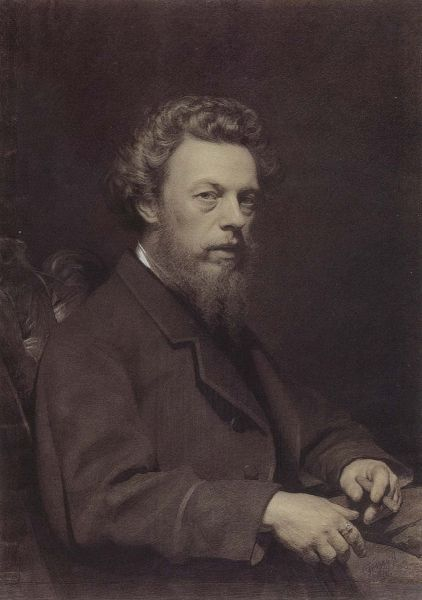
- Portrait drawing by Ivan Kramskoi, 1867, sauce; Russian Museum
- Born: 1833; Minsk Governorate
- Died: 1900 (aged 66–67); Saint Petersburg
- Resting place: Vyborg Cemetery, St. Petersburg
- Education: Maksim Vorobyov; Fyodor Bruni
- Alma mater: Imperial Academy of Arts (1854)
- Known for: Painting
- Awards: Big Gold Medal of the Imperial Academy of Arts (1854)
- Elected: Member Academy of Arts (1861)

Horawski, by Maria von der Pahlen, 1898, oils; Russian Museum

Apolinary Horawski (also spelled Gorawski; Belarusian: Апалінарый Гіляравіч Гараўскі; Russian: Аполлинарий Гиляриевич Горавский; 23 January 1833 – 28 March 1900) was a Belarusian-born Polish painter active mainly in Saint Petersburg.

== Biography ==
Apalinar (Apollinary) was born into an impoverished family of the Belarusian landed gentry. His parents were Guilyar Frantsevich and Maryanna Yakauleuna Garausky. The family used the coat of arms "Korab" (since the 17th century) and traced its bloodline to the Belarusian nobleman Grakala-Garausky (in the 19th century the first part of the surname Grakala fell into disuse). The artist's father Guilyar Garausky inherited the land (about 200 ha) from his father and grandfather. In the family, there were three daughters and the sons Ipalit (1828 ― after 1864), Apalinar (Apollinary) (1833―1900), Karl (1838 ― after 1869), Hektar (1843―1893), Guilyar (1847 ― after 1875). Karl and Hektar were professional servicemen, Ipalit, Apalinar and Guilyar ― artists.

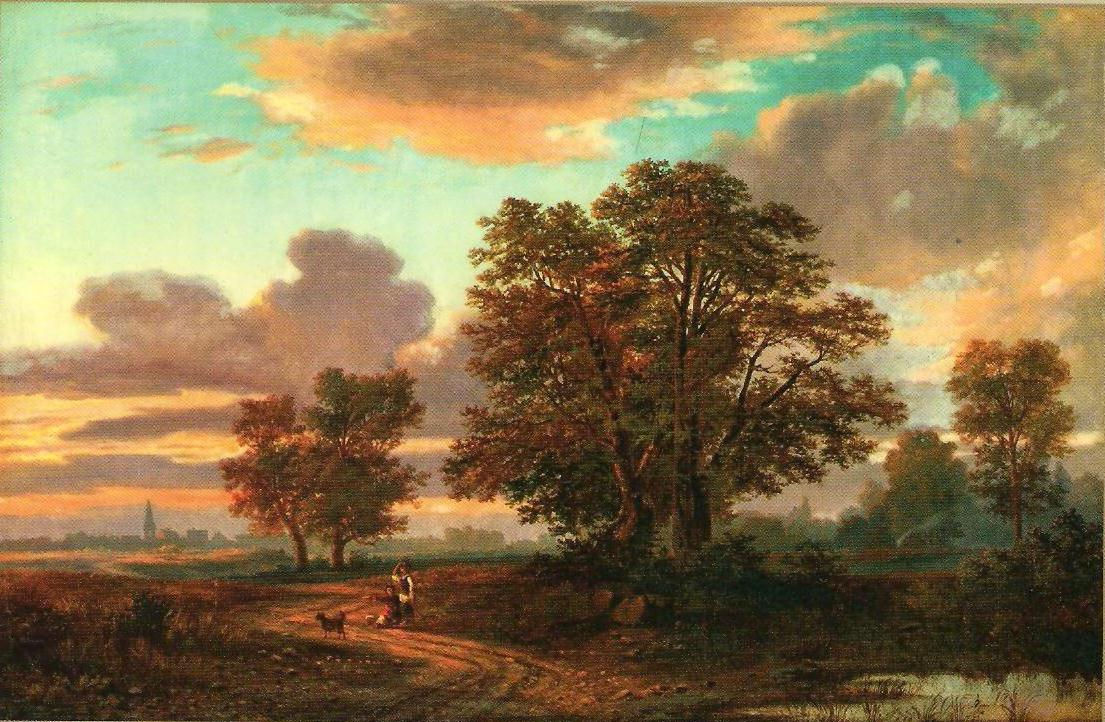
Evening in Minsk (1870s)

Apollinary, at ten, was sent to serve in the Brest-Litovsk Cadet Corps. Cadets studied general subjects of the classical school curriculum, such as languages, natural and social sciences. They were taught military disciplines, marching drill, riding, shooting, fencing, gymnastics, swimming, and also music and dance, drawing and painting. Apollinary had no inclination for military affairs, but liked drawing and painting.

The architect Nicholas Benois, who was visiting Goravsky's uncle (Chief of the Cadet Corps), took notice of Apollinary's works and later helped him enroll at the Imperial Academy of Arts, where he studied with Maxim Vorobiev and Fyodor Bruni. He graduated in 1854 with a gold medal. From 1855 to 1860 he travelled and painted throughout Europe, visiting Geneva, Paris and Rome and stopping in Düsseldorf to study with Andreas Achenbach. During this trip, he met Pavel Tretyakov and began a collaboration that would later be very beneficial to his career. On his return to Saint Petersburg, he was elected an Imperial Academician.

In 1869, the Academy gave him a stipend of 300 rubles annually to "complete his education" and produce paintings of folk-life in Belarus and Ukraine, a commission which he pursued diligently, despite the cold weather and rheumatism in his right leg. For twenty years (1865—1885), he occasionally taught drawing at the "Society for the Encouragement of the Arts", although he spent most of his time in Belarus at his estate near Kirilovich.

Apollinary Goravsky died on March 28, 1900, at the Mariinsky Hospital in St. Petersburg at the age of 67. The death was reported in Novoye Vremya (New Times) and Istorichesky Vestnik (Historical Herald) magazines. The burial of Horawski, at the Vyborg Cemetery, was forgotten even before the said cemetery was destroyed during the Soviet era.

His widow, Alexandra, remained without maintenance with daughters, Marya and Yulia, and started selling the artist's works in the 1900s. The greater part of his works are exhibited in the Belarusian National Arts Museum. In 2009, Belarus issued a stamp featuring his painting "Evening in Minsk".

== Works in the Belarusian National Arts Museum ==
- The view of the Narva Gates from Ekateringof Park (1851)
- Landscape with a river and a road (1853)
- Praying old woman (1872)
- The view of the Arve river in the vicinity of Chamonix (1859)
- Praying Jew (1857?)
- Portrait of the mother (1868)
- The bathers (1858)
- Evening (1854)
- Landscape with a river (1859)
- Oaks (1858)
- Rural landscape (1855)
- The repentant Mary Magdalene (1861)
- Portrait of an unknown in a black dress (1868)
- Portrait of S.M. Tretyakova (1857)
- A weedy pond
- Near a forge (1862)
- Landscape with a river (1853)
- The view of an oak grove on the banks of the Svislach river near Babruisk (1855)
- By the piano (1868)
- By the easel (1868)
- An evening in Minsk province (1870s)
- Portrait of a young woman in a white dress (1863)
- Portrait of an unknown with a palette (1867)
- Portrait of artist L.F. Lagorio (1890s)
- Clover in gloom and forest expanses (1895)
- Landscape (1897)

== Selected works ==
Landscape paintings

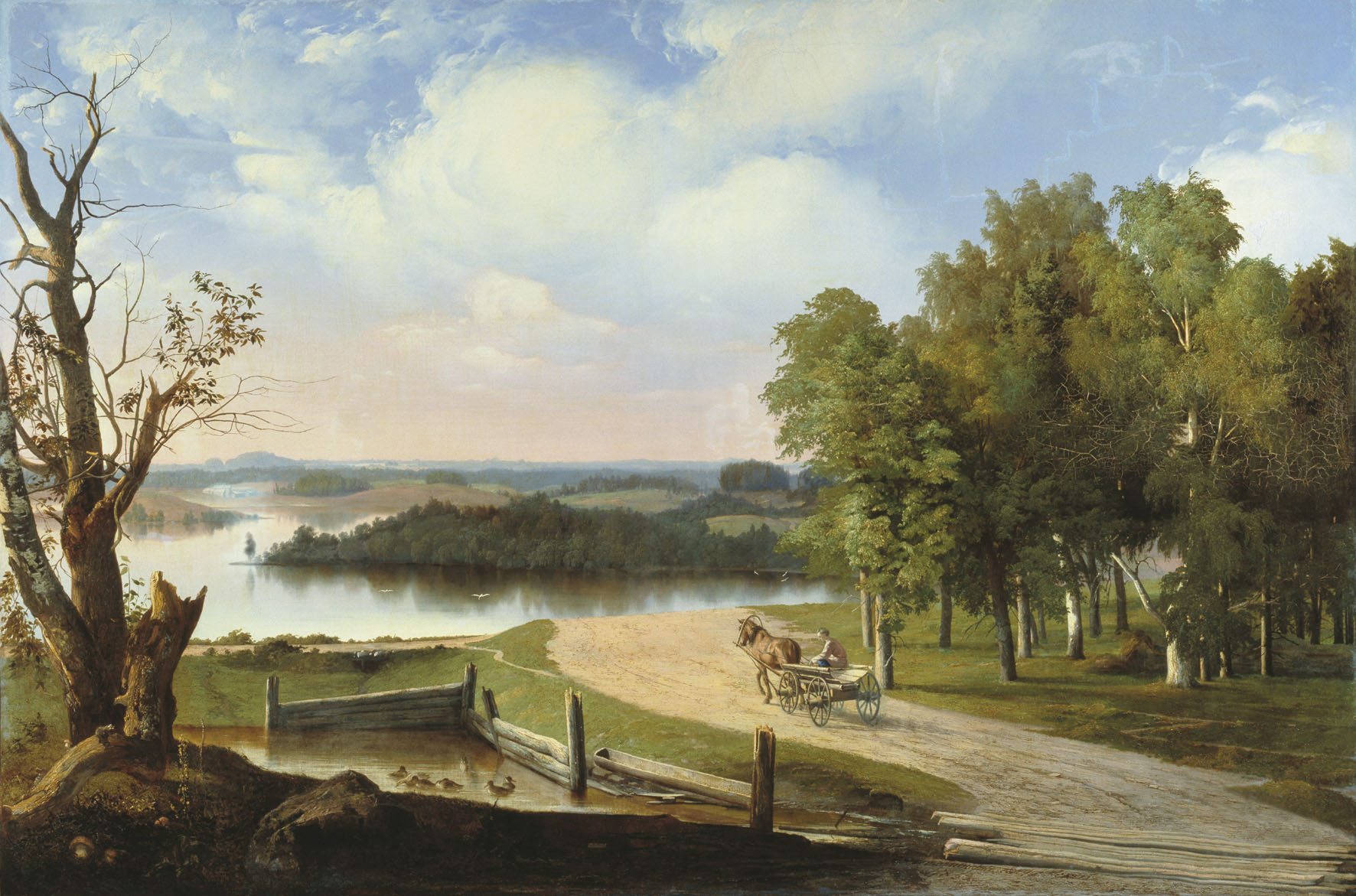
Landscape with a River and a Road, 1853; Art Museum of Belarus

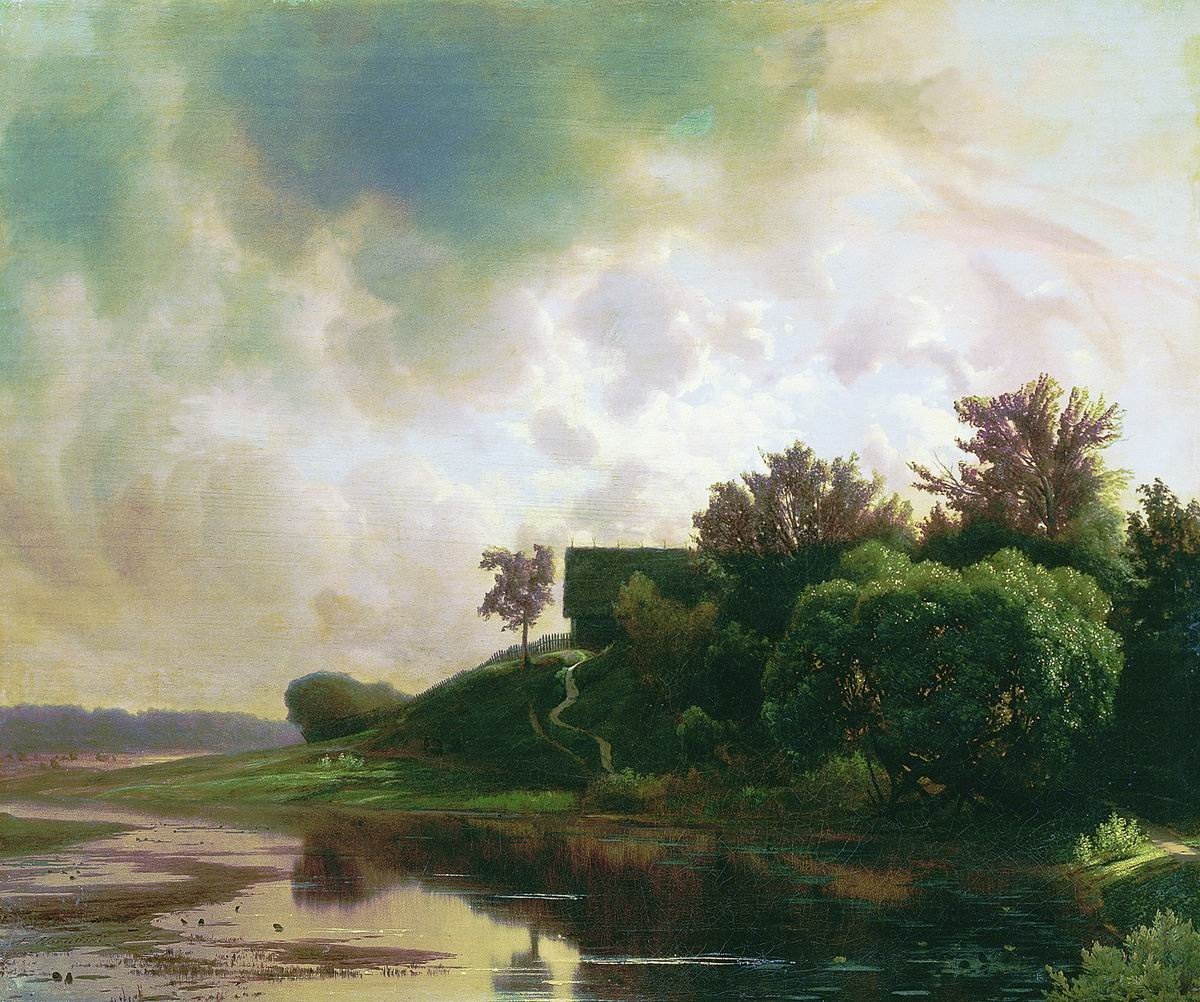
Evening Landscape, 1854; Stavropol Regional Museum of Visual Art

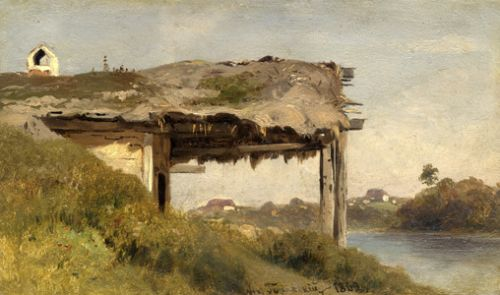
Near a Forge, 1862; Art Museum of Belarus
Portrait paintings

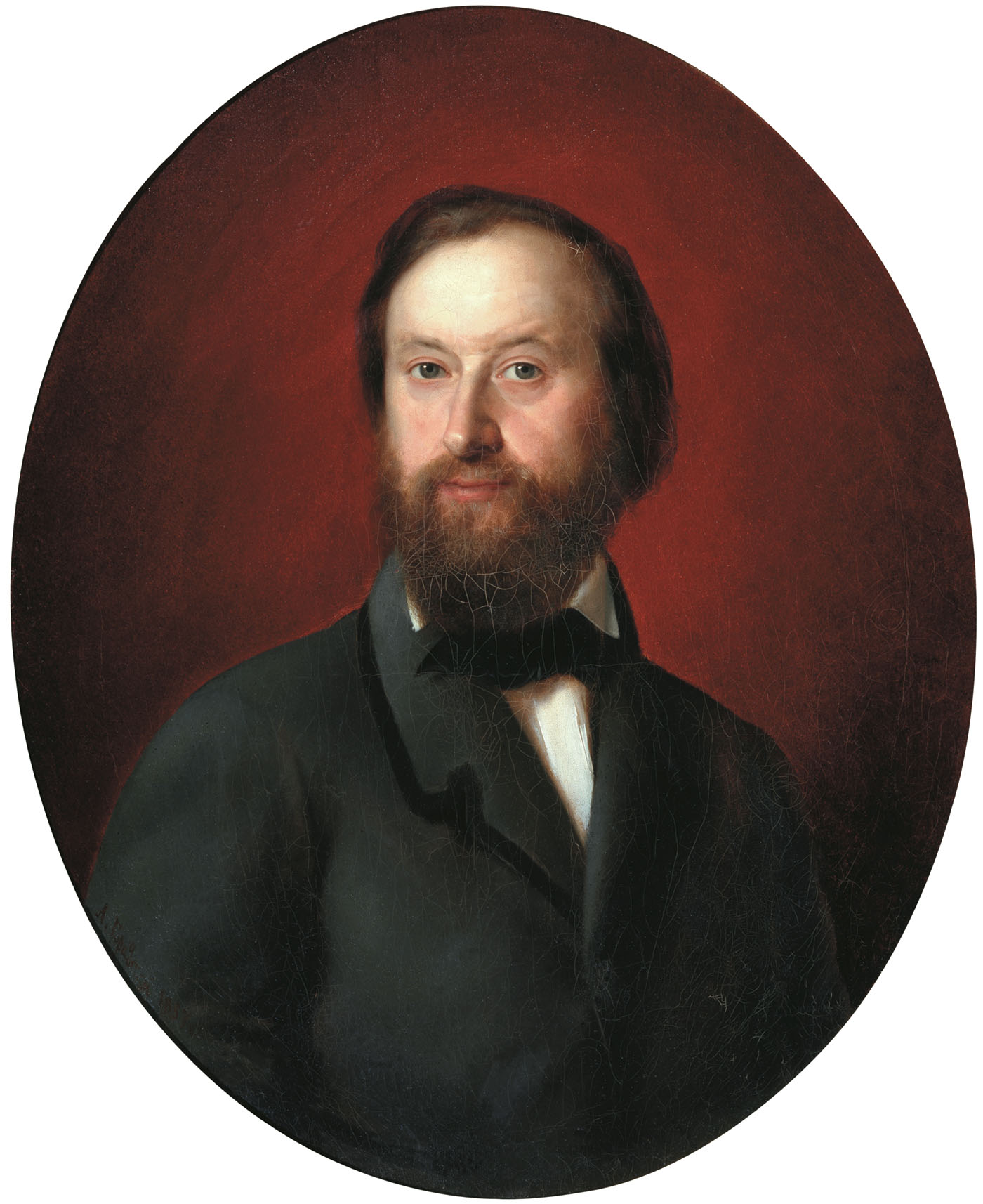
Kozma Soldatyonkov, 1857; Tretyakov Gallery

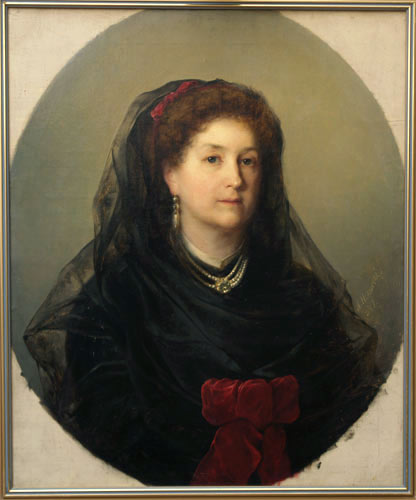
A Lady in Black, 1868; Russian Museum

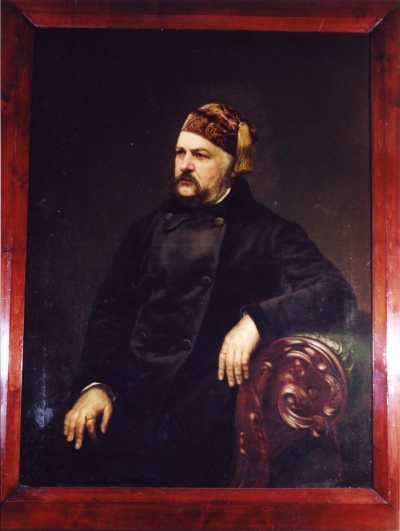
Mikhail Glinka, after photograph by Sergey L. Levitsky, c. 1869–1871; Moscow Conservatory, commissioned and once owned by Pavel Tretyakov

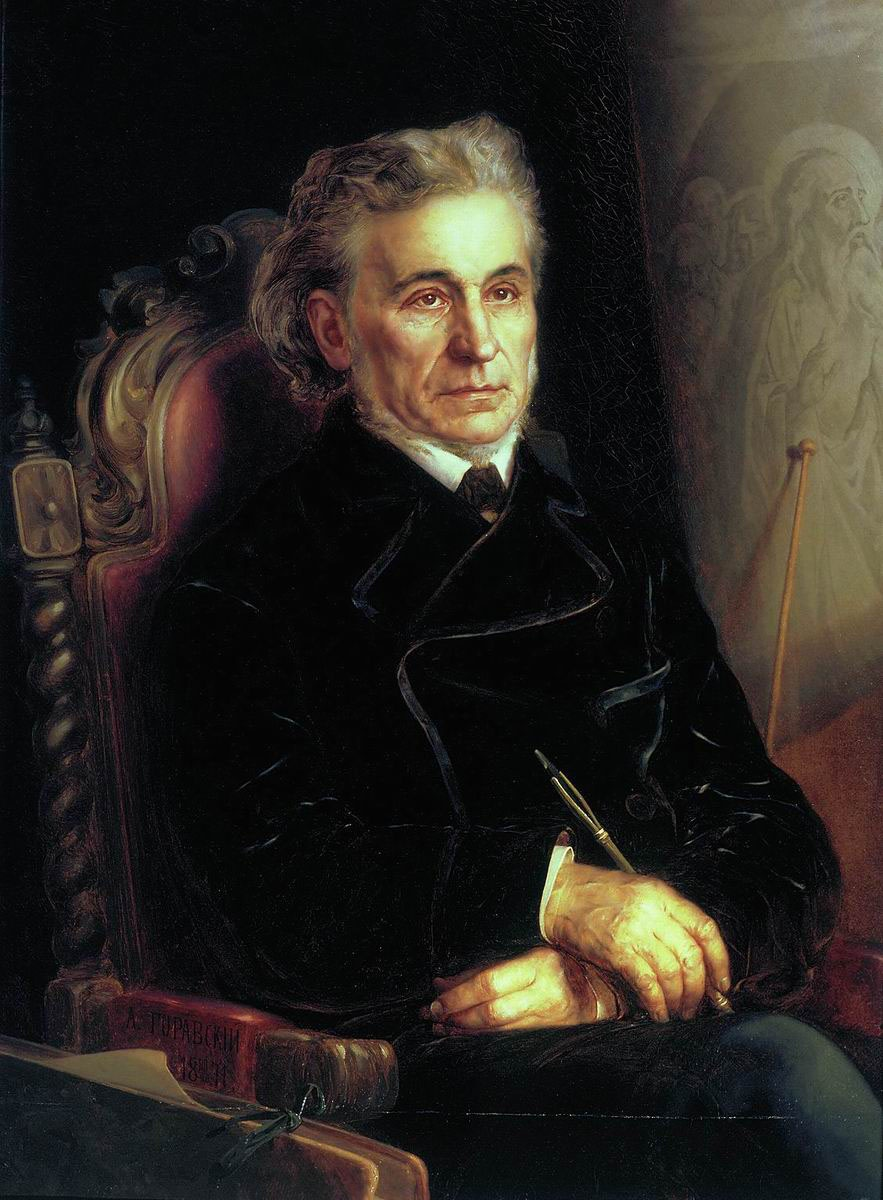
Fyodor Bruni, 1871; Tretyakov Gallery

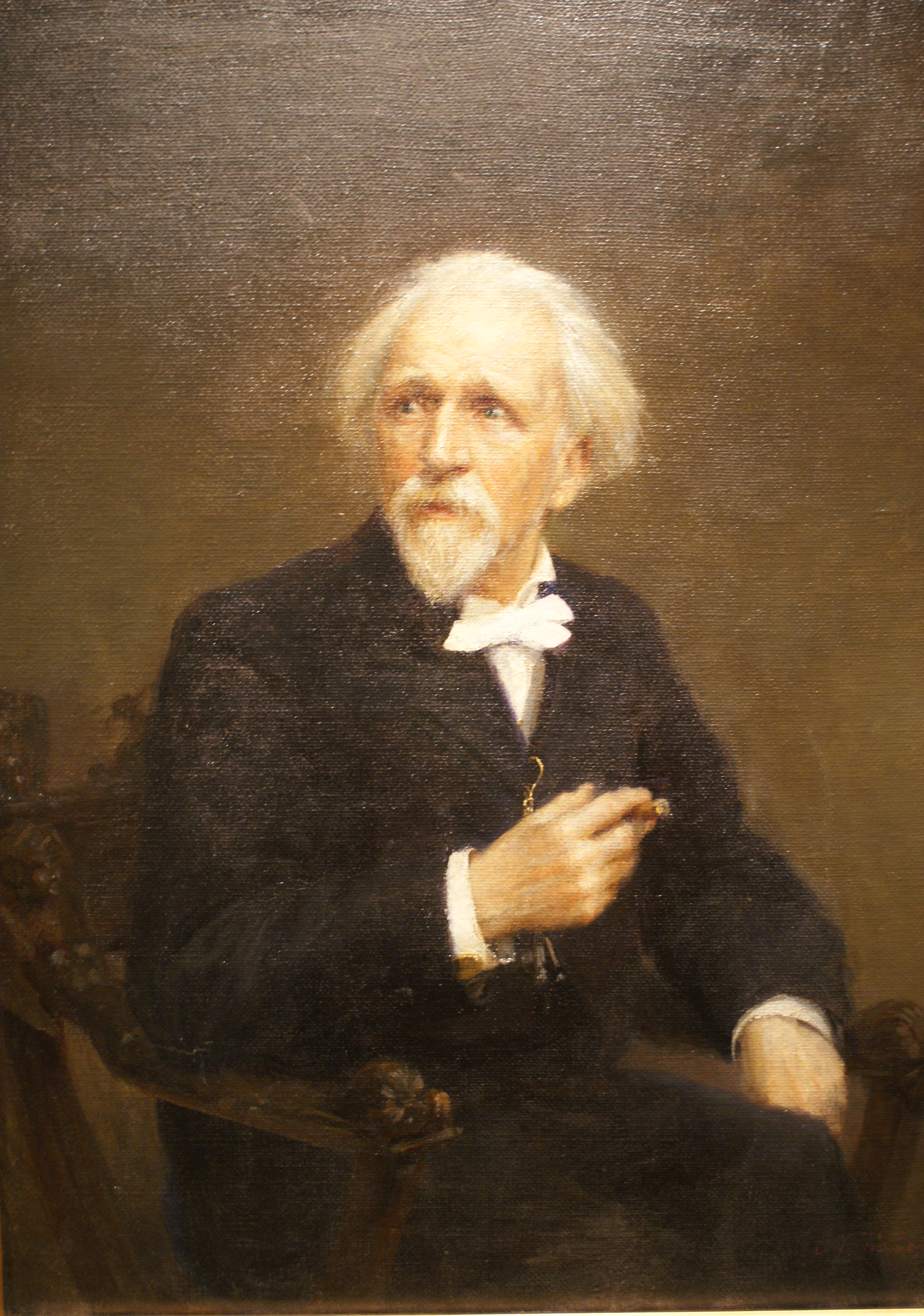
Lev Lagorio, 1890s; Art Museum of Belarus

== Literature ==
- Апалінар Гараўскі = Аполлинарий Горавский = Apalinar Garausky. Минск : Беларусь, 2014. ― ISBN 978-985-01-1111-1.
- Гiсторыя беларускага мастацтва (History of Belarusian Art) 6 vols. Мінск : 1989.
