= Joseph Edwards Carpenter =

- Born: 2 November 1813
- Origin: England
- Died: 6 May 1885 (aged 71)
- Occupations: Playwright, Composer, and Songwriter

Joseph Edwards Carpenter (2 November 1813, London – 6 May 1885, Bayswater) was an English playwright, composer, and songwriter.

In 1851, Carpenter moved from Leamington to London. He wrote various touring musical entertainments such as The Road, the Rail and the River, and a Vocal, Pictorial, and Descriptive Illustration of Uncle Tom's Cabin (1853). He appeared in Wisbech at the Public-hall accompanied by the Misses Jolly to present musical entertainments including An Hour in Fairyland in November 1854. A two-act musical drama The Sanctuary and his three-act drama Love and Honour appeared in 1854, and a three-act drama Adam Bede in 1862.

He wrote lyrics for over 2500 songs and duets, publishing them in Ainsworth's Magazine and other magazines, and partnering with various composers including Henry Bishop, Stephen Glover, and James Ernest Perring.

From 1865 to 1867, Carpenter edited 10 volumes of Penny Readings in prose and verse.

He is buried on the western side of Highgate Cemetery.

== Works ==
- Random rhymes or lays of London, 1833
- Minstrel musings, London, 1838
- The romance of the dreamer, and other poems, London, 1841
- What Are the Wild Waves Saying?, 1853
- Songs and ballads, new ed., London, 1844; new ed. with additions, 1854
- Poems and lyrics, new ed., London, 1845
- Lays and legends of fairyland, London & Leamington, 1849
- My jubilee volume, London, 1883
