= John Perrin =

John Perrin may refer to:

- John Perrin (American sportsman) (1898–1969, American baseball and football player
- John Perrin (translator) (1558–1615), English churchman and academic
- John Draper Perrin (1890–1967), Canadian entrepreneur, mining executive and civic leader
- Johnny Perrin (born 1983), musician
- John Gordon Perrin (born 1989), Canadian volleyball player

== See also ==
- John Perring (disambiguation)
- Jack Perrin (1896–1967), actor
- Nig Perrine (John Perrine, 1885–1948), American baseball infielder
