= Fyodor Bruni =

Russian painter (1799–1875)

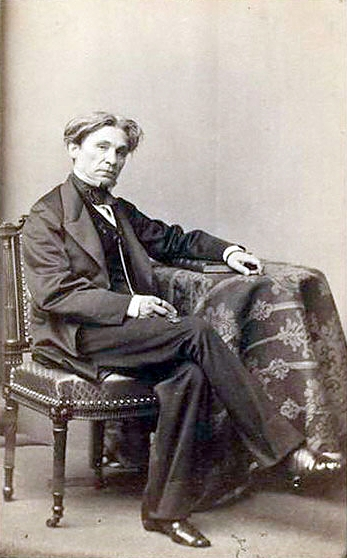
- Portrait photograph by Andrey Denyer, c. 1865
- Born: Fidelio Bruni; 10 June 1799; Milan
- Died: 30 August 1875 (aged 76); Saint Petersburg
- Resting place: Tikhvin Cemetery, Saint Petersburg
- Education: Imperial Academy of Arts (1818)
- Known for: History painting
- Notable work: The Brazen Serpent, 1833–1841
- Spouse: Angelica Serni (m. 1835)
- Children: 5
- Elected: Member Academy of Arts (1834); Professor by rank (1836)

Fedele Giovanni Baroffi Bruni, russified as Fyodor Antonovich Bruni (10 June 1799 – 30 August 1875) was a Russian painter and draughtsman of Swiss Italian descent, active during the Romantic period, best known for his history paintings. Along with his contemporaries Karl Bryullov and Alexander Ivanov, Bruni is considered among the most important Russian artisans during Tsar Nicholas I's reign.

== Biography ==
His father, Antonio, was a Swiss Italian painter and art restorer who relocated to Russia in 1800 to work on a project at Saint Michael's Castle for Tsar Paul I. At the age of ten, he was enrolled at the Imperial Academy of Arts, where he studied with Alexei Yegorov, Andrey Ivanovich Ivanov and Vasily Shebuyev. He graduated in 1818 with the title "Artist Class XIV".

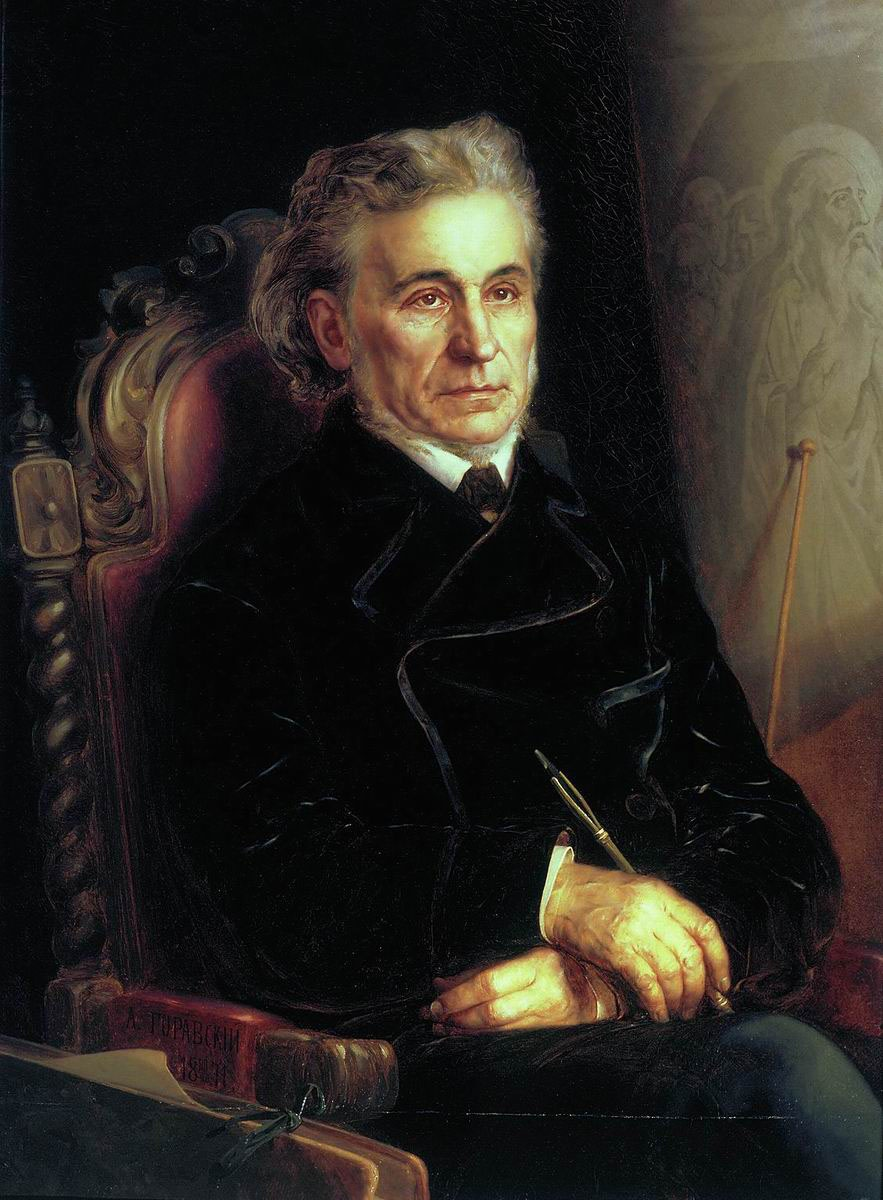
Apolinary Horawski, Fyodor Bruni, 1871, oil on canvas; Tretyakov Gallery, Moscow

His father, believing that a Russian art education was insufficient, sent him for further studies in Italy. At the age of twenty-two, he created his first large-scale work ("The Death of Camilla"), which was exhibited in the Capitol. Ten years later, when the painting was shown in Saint Petersburg for the first time, it earned him the title of Academician. In the early 1830s, he began a monumental painting of "The Brazen Serpent", but before its completion, he was recalled to Saint Petersburg to work on a project at Saint Isaac's Cathedral and teach at the Academy. He arrived in 1836 and produced several works for the Kazan Cathedral as well. Mikhail Botkin and Arseny Meshchersky were among his first students at the Academy.

In 1838, he was able to return to Rome to finish his work on "The Brazen Serpent". Two years later, it was completed and moved to Saint Petersburg, where it was exhibited in one of the halls of the newly restored Winter Palace. It is now the largest canvas on display at the Russian Museum. Returning to Rome for a third time from 1841 to 1845, he produced twenty-five sketches that would be the basis for frescoes at Saint Isaac's Cathedral. Some of the frescoes were executed by Bruni himself, others by various artists under his direction. The work was completed in 1853, and the originals are now stored at the Russian Museum.

In 1849, he became the custodian of the gallery at the Hermitage Museum and was sent abroad twice to acquire paintings for the collection there. Six years later, he became Rector of the Department of Sculpture and Painting at the Academy.

As he grew older, however, he became reclusive, even distancing himself from his own students and disappearing for weeks at a time. In his efforts to sustain the academic tradition, he began to openly express his dislike for younger artists and was forced to resign in 1871 because of his behaviour. By the time of his death, he was an honorary Professor at the Florence Academy of Fine Arts and the Accademia di San Luca in Rome.

== Paintings ==
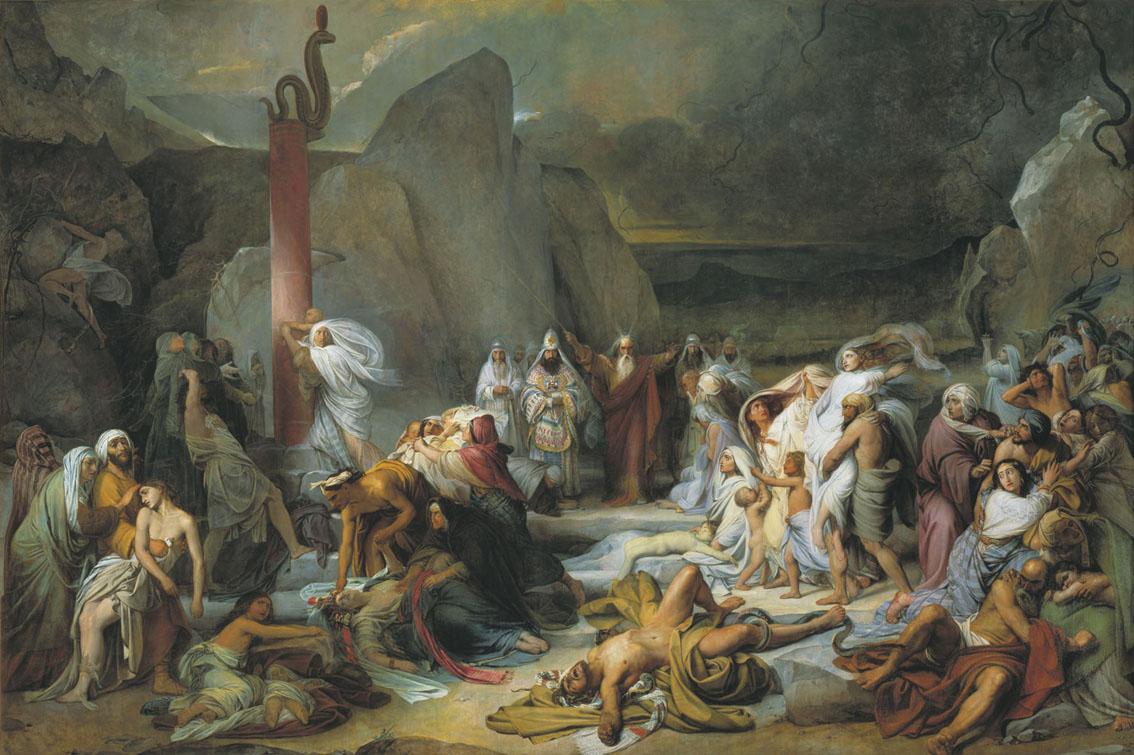
The Brazen Serpent (1840)

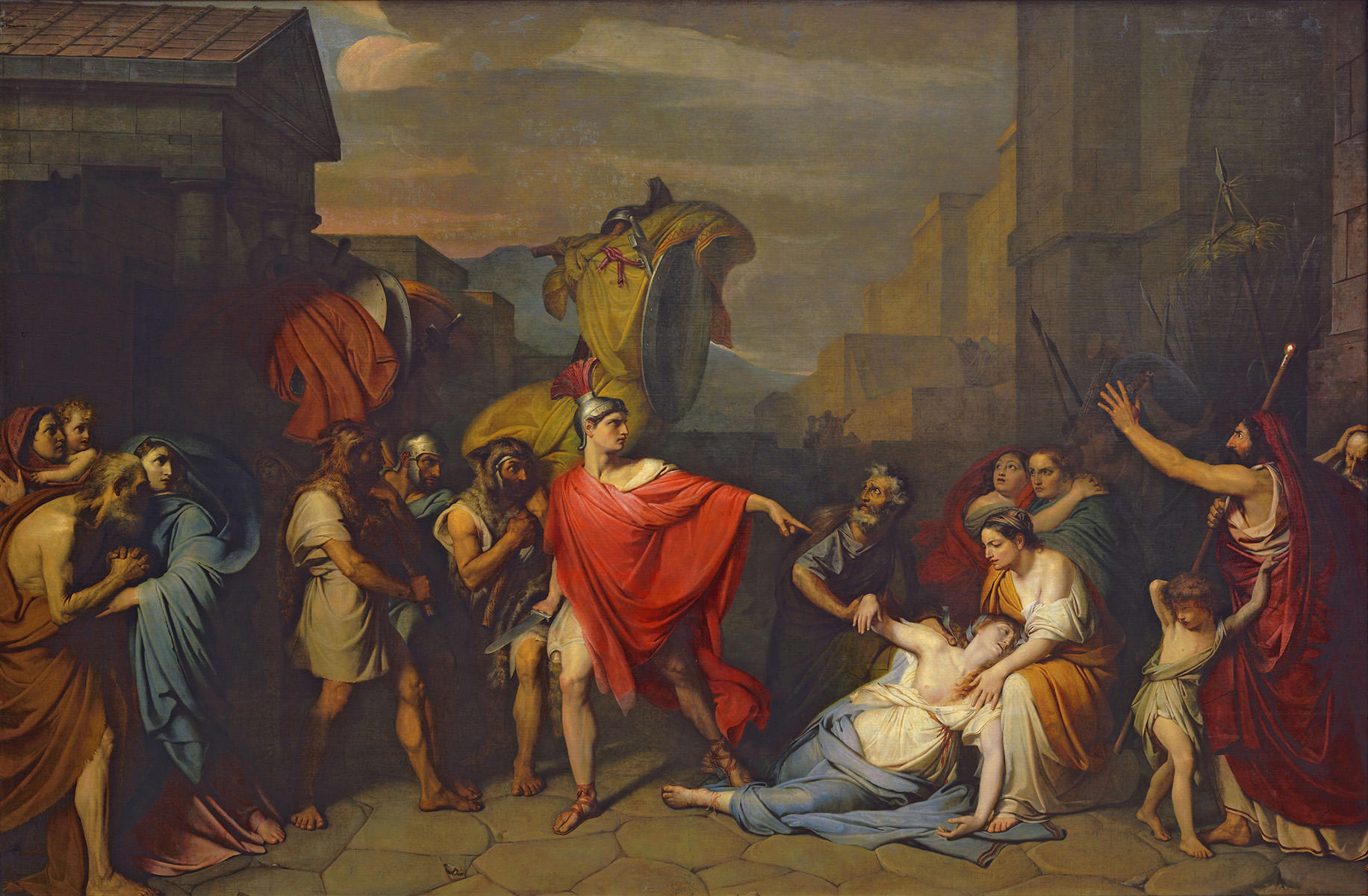
Death of Camilla (1824)

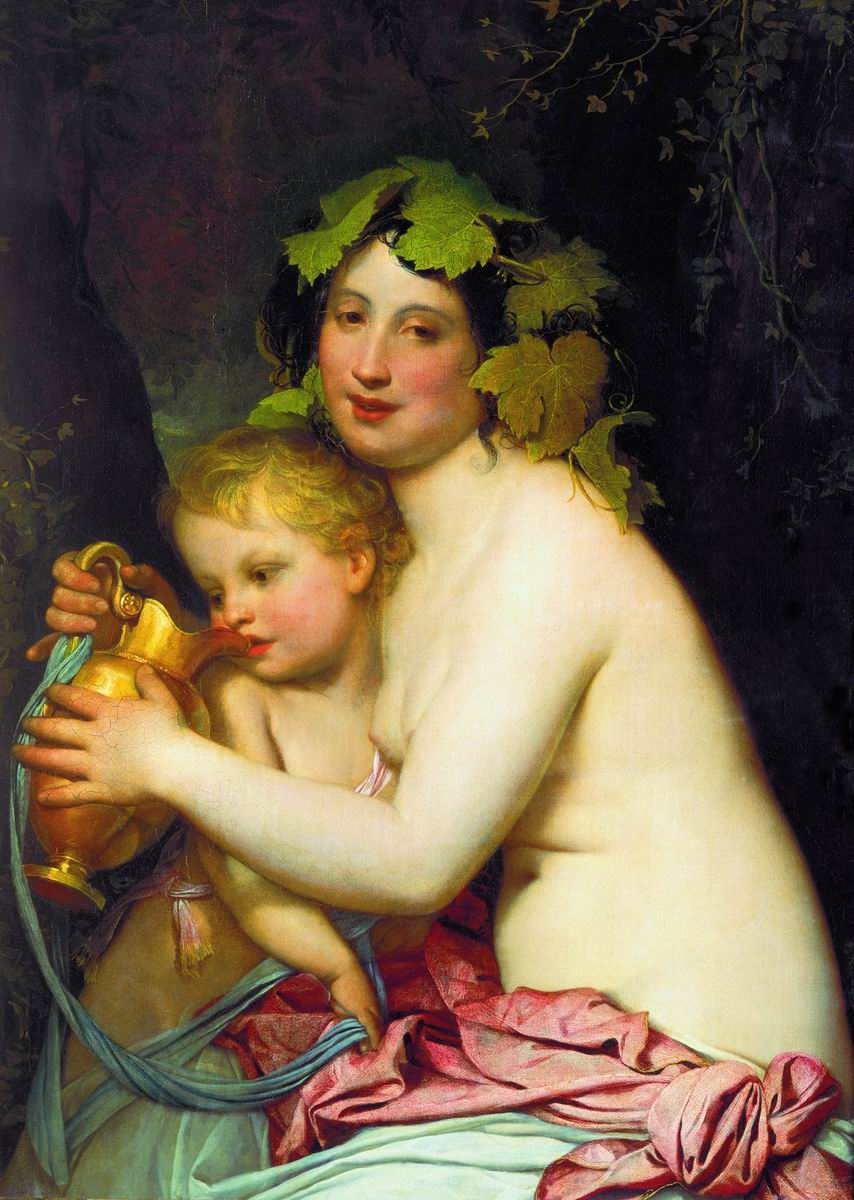
Bacchante Plying a Cupid with Wine (1828)

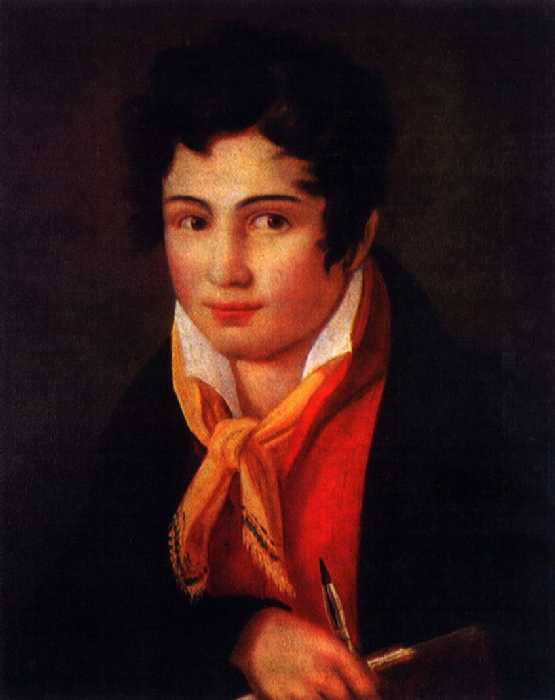
Self-portrait (1810)

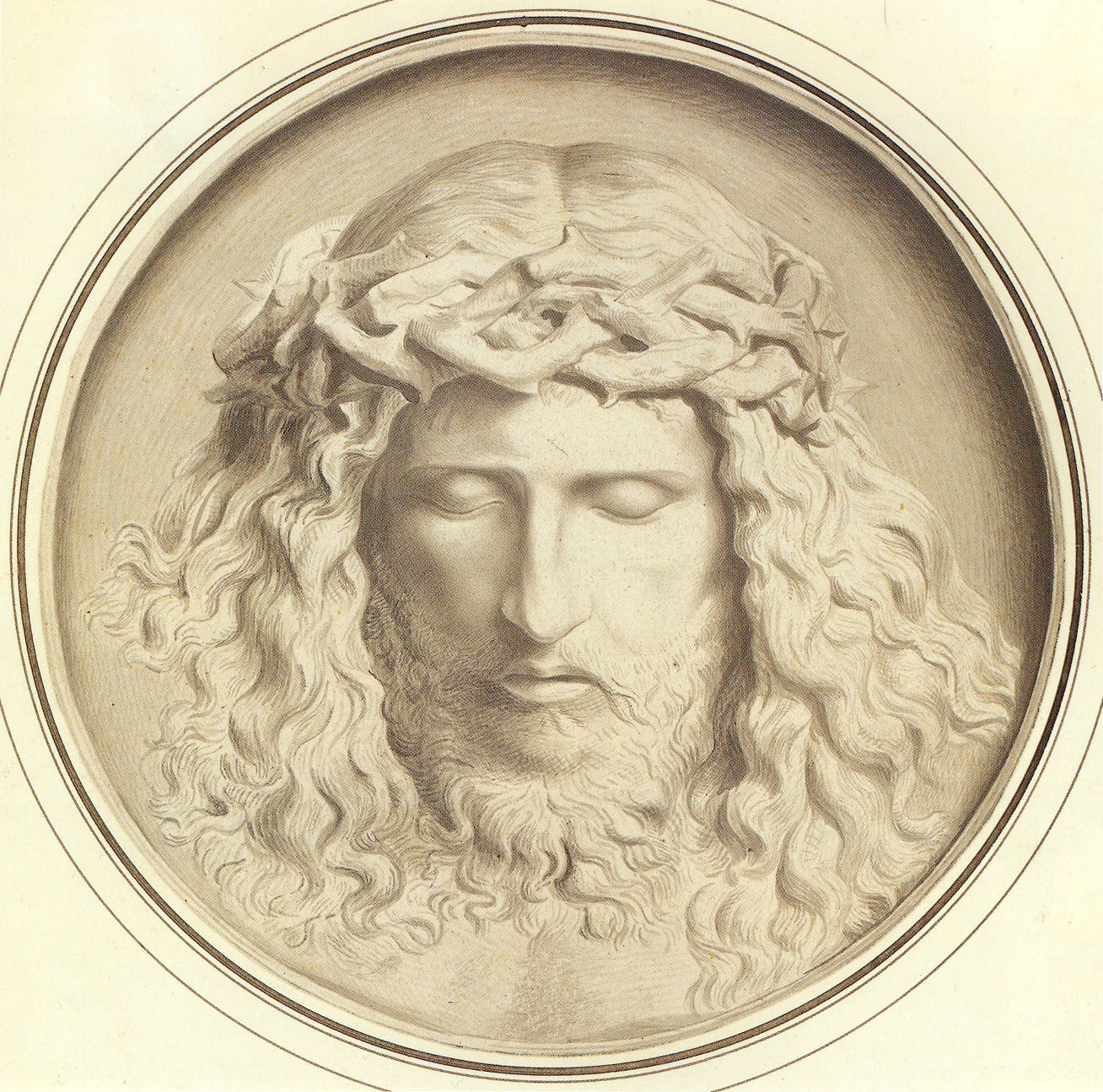
Head of Christ wearing a crown of thorns

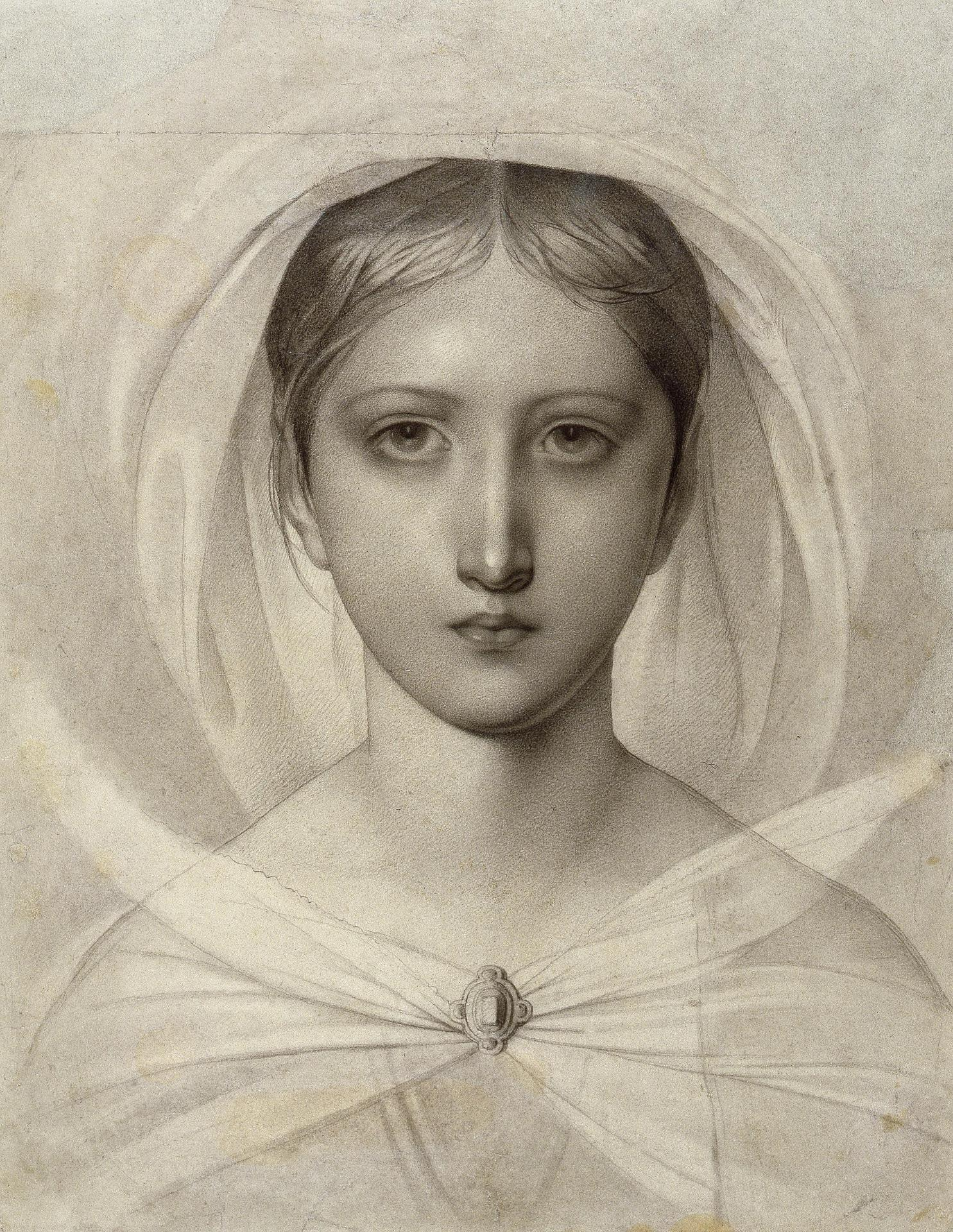
Head of the Madonna (1840)

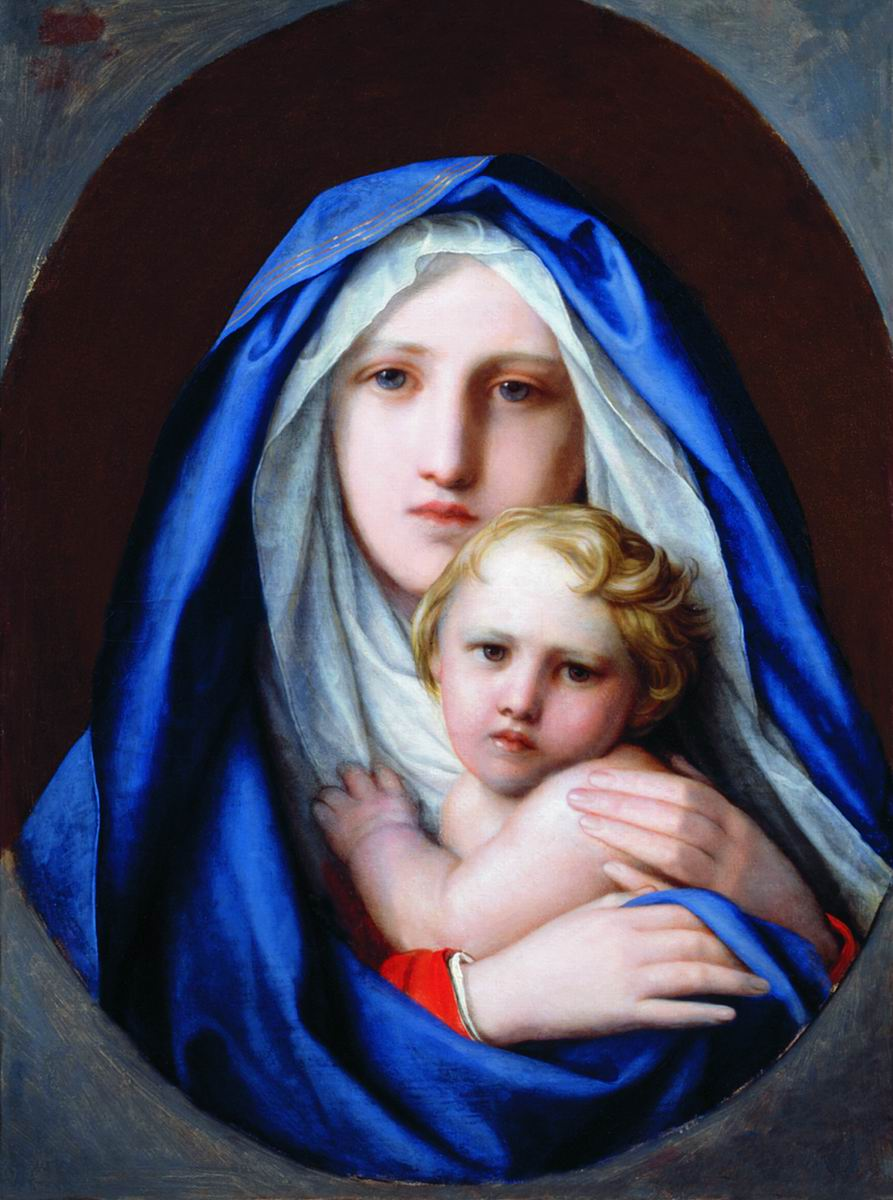
The Virgin and Child (1858)

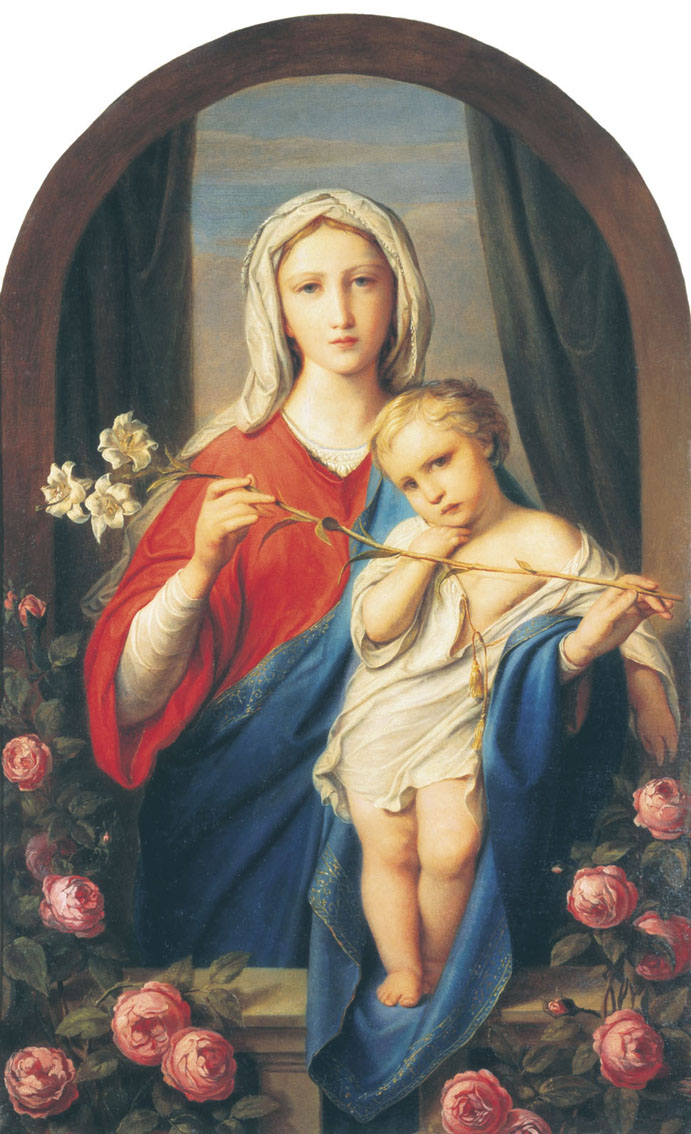
The Virgin and Child in Roses (1843)
