= James Ernest Perring =

English opera tenor (1822–1889)

James Ernest Perring (1 March 1822 – 12 January 1889) was a British opera singer, voice trainer, and composer.

== Life ==
Born in London, Perring led the soprano chorus as a boy at Her Majesty's Theatre before entering the Royal Academy of Music, studying under Sir Julius Benedict. He later studied in Italy and became a good friend of singer Sims Reeves. On his return to England, Perring commenced a successful career as a leading tenor, singing with Jenny Lind and Marietta Piccolomini, among others. He was noted for singing oratorios. He toured both Europe and the United States to great acclaim, with the great performers of the day.

He later became a vocal teacher, coaching singers such as Emma Abbott and Max Alvary. In 1850 he suffered financial hardship and was confined to a debtors' prison, at which time he was described as a "Professor of Music and Singing, composer and organist, occasionally dealing in musical instruments".

By 1859, he had moved to the United States, where he continued to perform until at least 1865, and teach and publish music until his death in 1889. From 1874 to 1876, he was the choirmaster and organist at Calvary Episcopal Church in Memphis, Tennessee. In 1878 he was hired by the new Cincinnati Musical College (a predecessor to the Cincinnati College-Conservatory of Music) to teach singing. He composed many ballads, parlor songs, and nocturnes, although few if any modern recordings of his work exist.

Perring died in 1889 in New York City and was buried at Westlawn Cemetery. He was survived by his New York-born wife and three sons and four daughters.

== Published pieces ==
- "The Fairy Ring", words Joseph Edwards Carpenter, 1840
- "I'd be a Fairy", words Carpenter, 1840
- "The Maids of Merry England", words R. Wynne, 1844
- "My Lowly Cottage Home", words Carpenter, 1845
- "May I Love Thee, Hebrew Maiden", words Carpenter, 1846
- "Away We Speed to our Native Shore"/"Flow on Ripling Stream"/"My Lowly Cottage Home"/"Sail on, Sail on, my Bark", words Carpenter, music by Strauss and Labitzky, arranged by Perring, 1847
- "I'd Be a Gypsy", words Carpenter, 1847
- "'Tis the Way of the World", words Carpenter, 1847
- "Come to the South", words Carpenter, 1848
- "The Fair Green Fields of England", words Carpenter, 1850
- "Have Faith in One Another", words Carpenter, 1850
- "I'd Be a Bloomer", words Ernest Reed, 1851
- "The Moss Rose", words Lt. Col. Addison, 1852
- "I'll Keep Thee in Remembrance", words Carpenter, 1854
- "Eva (song from Uncle Tom's Cabin)", words Carpenter, 1855
- "The Mountains of Malvern", words A. Park, 1856
- "Ye Sons of Merry England", words Col. Addison, 1857
- Six Songs (When Soft Upon the Grassy, My Youth's Early Dream, Young Kate, Darling Little Minnie, Lightly & Gaily, My Love He Is a Warrior Bold), words Charles J. Sprague, 1859
- "The Ladye That I Love", words J. Simmonds, 1860
- "Why Did She Leave Me", words Carpenter, 1860
- "The Child and the Stars", words Carpenter, 1861
- Admired Songs and Ballads, 1864
- "Beware!" (words by Henry Wadsworth Longfellow), 1864
- "Life's Rosy Morning", words Simmonds, 1864
- "The Spirit Bell", 1865
- "Come to Me Angel of Sleep", words Mrs. Frances Baker, 1866
- "Slowly Now the Day is Dying", words James T. Dudley, 1866
- "Sweet Nellie", 1867
- "The Wishing Gate", 1867
- "The Belle of the Ball Room", 1870
- "The Happiest Land", words translated by Longfellow, 1870
- "The Home of my Youth", words A. Morland, 1870
- "Break O' Day Galop", 1871
- "Rippling Rivulet", 1871
- "Blessed Home!", words Ellen C. Howarth, 1872
- "Grand Exhibition March", 1872
- "I'm Wand'ring Alone in the Twilight", words C. O. Clayton, 1872
- "Marguerite", 1872
- "Nocturno", 1876
- "As Pants the Hart" (a setting of Psalms 42), 1879
- "The Hope That Breathes of Spring", words Caroline Howe, 1879
- "There'll Be a Good Time at the Mowing", 1879
- "My Childhood's Home", 1880
- "The Danish Peasant Girl", 1880
- "Courtship", words F. Langbridge, 1881
- "The Bride and Her Sailor", words Dean Delmont, 1882
- "Come Live With Me and Be My Love", words Christopher Marlowe, 1882
- "Fairies of Dreamland", words Frank W. Green, 1882
- "Heaven Watches O'er You", 1882
- "The Love Once Ours", 1882
- "Oh! Do Not Doubt Me", words George Cooper, 1882
- "Under the Almond Tree", 1882
- "Flirting in the Square", 1884
- "The Shades of Night", 1887
- "Fascination", 1888
- "The Maids of Dear Columbia", words R. Wynne, ?
