= John Perring =

John Perring may refer to:

- John Shae Perring, British engineer & Egyptologist
- Sir John Perring, 1st Baronet (1765–1831), Lord Mayor of London, 1803, MP for New Romney and Hythe
- Sir John Perring, 2nd Baronet (1794–1843) of the Perring baronets
- Sir John Raymond Perring, 2nd Baronet (born 1931) of the Perring baronets

== See also ==
- John Perrin (disambiguation)
