= Max Alvary =

German operatic tenor

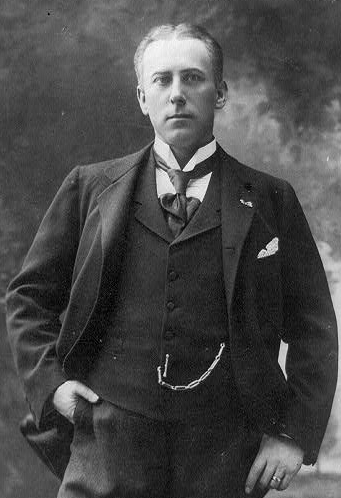
Max Alvary in 1896

Max Alvary (3 May 1856 – 7 November 1898), born as Maximilian Achenbach, was a German operatic tenor.

Born in Düsseldorf, Germany, he was the son of the painter Andreas Achenbach, over whose initial objections he pursued his singing career. He studied in Frankfurt with Julius Stockhausen, and in Milan with Francesco Lamperti.

He had a fine dramatic voice and a handsome stage presence, and speedily made a reputation in Germany in the leading roles in Wagnerian opera. From 1885 onwards he also appeared in America and England. On 9 November 1887 Alvary appeared as the title character in the United States premiere of Wagner's Siegfried at the Metropolitan Opera in New York. Vividly embodying Siegfried's youth and fiery individualism, the tenor created a sensation and became an idol of New York opera goers until his departure in 1889. In 1892, his performances as Tristan and Siegfried at the Royal Opera House, Covent Garden, aroused great enthusiasm.

In October 1894, he was seriously injured in a fall while rehearsing Siegfried at Mannheim and never fully recovered; he retired from the stage in 1897.

Alvary died in Großtabarz, Thuringia, Germany, in 1898.
