= Lev Lagorio =

Russian painter

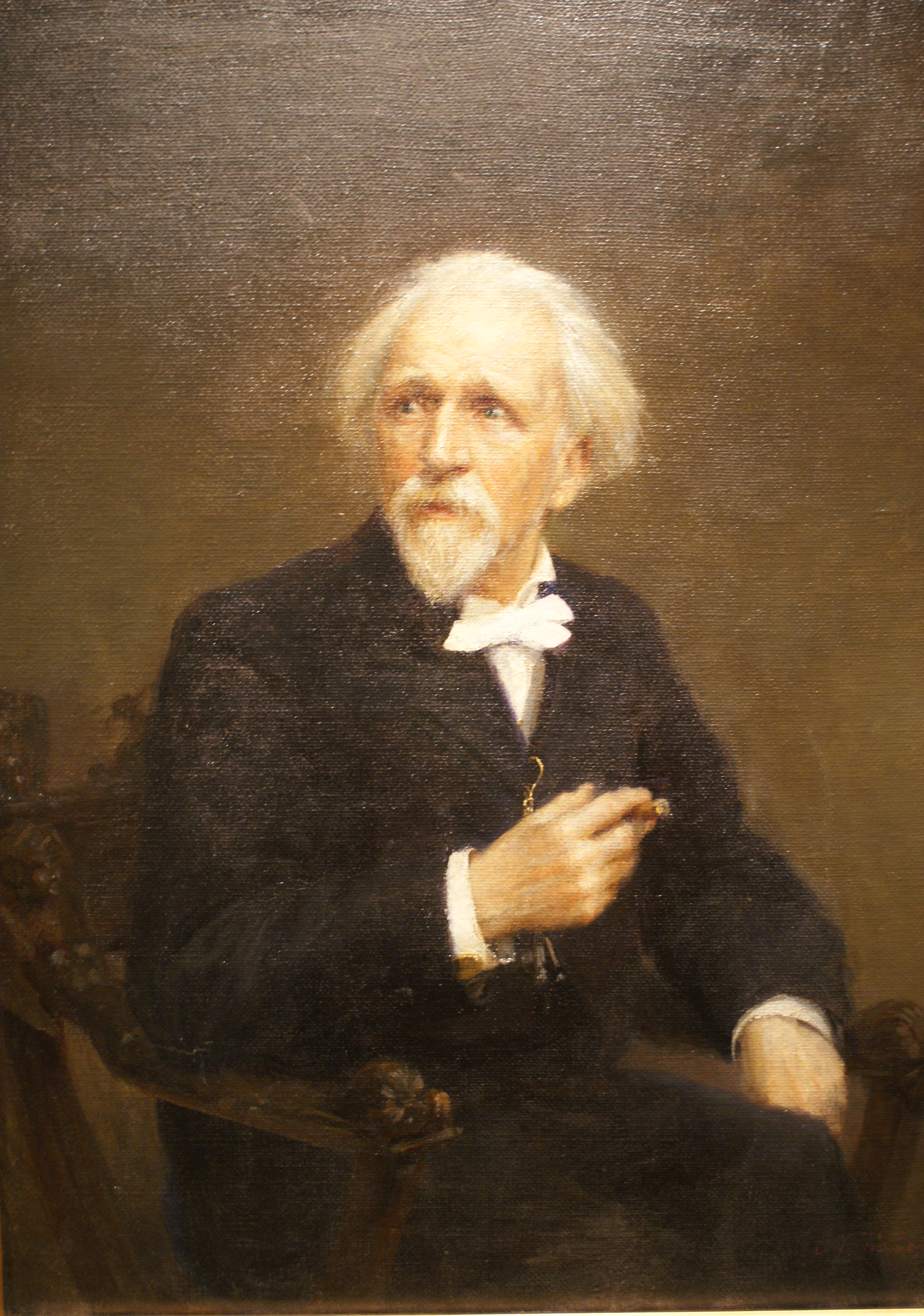
- Portrait of Lev Lagorio by Apollinary Goravsky
- Born: June 16, 1827; Feodosia
- Died: December 9, 1905 (aged 78); Saint Petersburg
- Education: Imperial Academy of Arts
- Known for: Painting
- Awards: Big Gold Medal of the Imperial Academy of Arts (1850)
- Elected: Professor by rank (1860)

Lev Feliksovich Lagorio (Russian: Лев Феликсович Лагорио; 9 December 1826 – 17 November 1905) was a Russian painter in the Academical style, active in Crimea and St. Petersburg during Tsars Nicholas I through Nicholas II's reigns, known primarily for his seascapes and maritime scenes. He was associated with the "Cimmerian" school of painting, composed of artists who worked in Southern Crimea.

== Biography ==
Lev Feliksovich was born in Feodosia in the family of the Neapolitan vice-consul. His father, Felice Lagorio (1781-1857) was a Genoese merchant serving as Vice-Consul for the Kingdom of the Two Sicilies. From 1839 to 1840, he received his first artistic training in the studios of Ivan Aivazovsky. In 1842, with the support of Alexander Kaznacheyev, the Governor of Taurida, he was able to enroll at the Imperial Academy of Arts. Later, he was able to obtain financial assistance from the Duke of Leuchtenberg, the Academy's new President. Among his teachers there were Alexander Sauerweid, Maxim Vorobiev and Bogdan Willewalde.

In 1850 Lagorio graduated from the Academy of Arts with a gold medal. In 1850, he received the title of "Artist" for his painting "View of Lakhta" and, two years later, became a Russian citizen. He was also awarded a pension to study abroad, visiting Paris first (1853), then Rome, where he stayed until 1859, the last two years at his own expense.

After his return, in 1860, he was named a Professor and exhibited the works he had created in Italy. He travelled to the Caucasus in 1861 and presented a series of landscapes from there to Tsar Alexander II, who presented him with the Order of Saint Anna.

He returned to the Caucasus in 1863 and 1864, with the entourage of Grand Duke Mikhail Nikolayevich, where he participated in the Caucasian War. Afterward he settled in Saint Petersburg, spent the summers in Sudak and often travelled abroad.

In 1885, he was commissioned to paint a series of works on the Russo-Turkish War of 1877-1878 and visited battlefields throughout the European and Asian theaters. In 1900, he was named an honorary member of the Academy. He is buried at Novodevichy Cemetery.

== Selected paintings ==
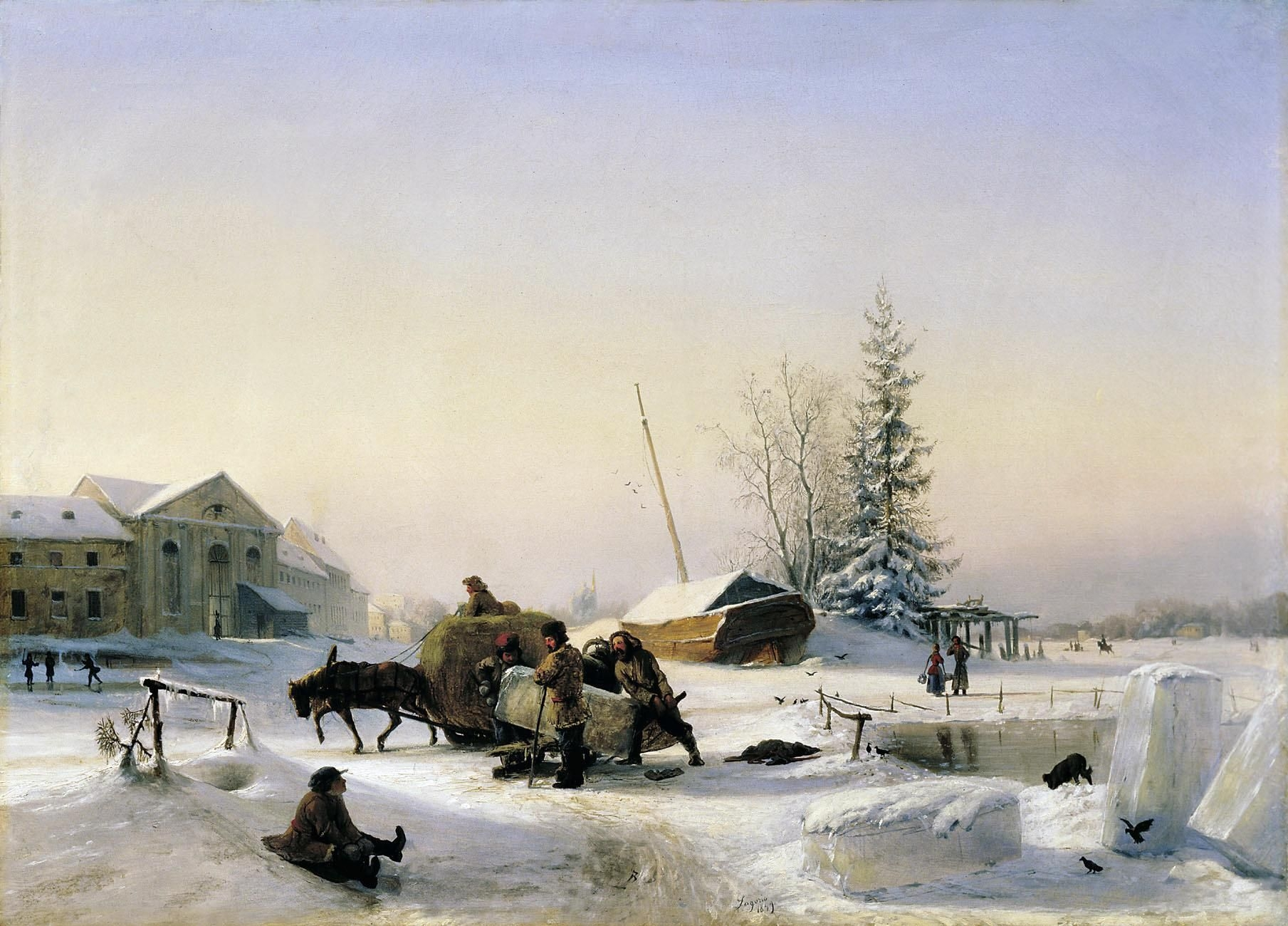
Transporting Ice, 1849

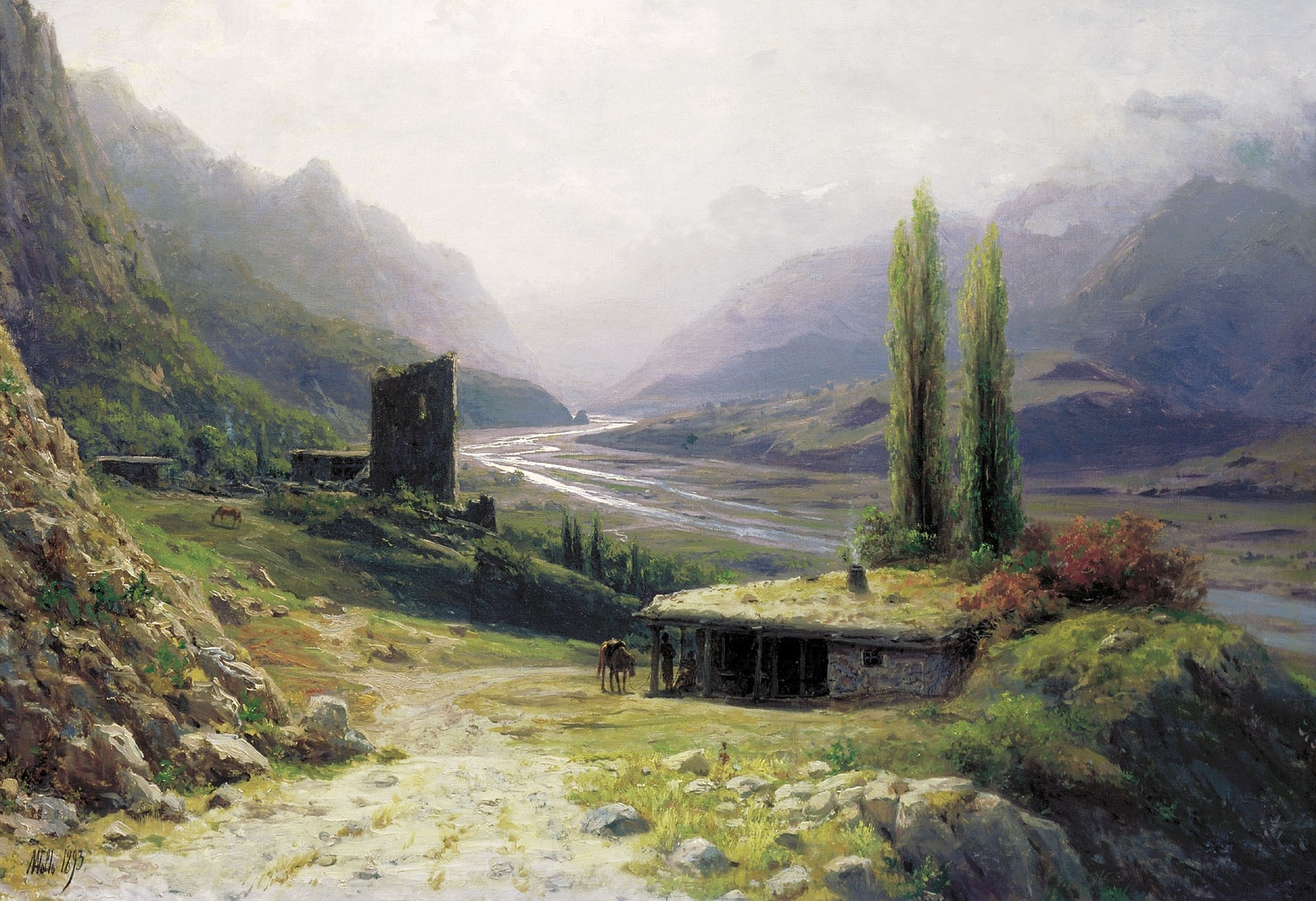
Caucasian Gorge, 1893

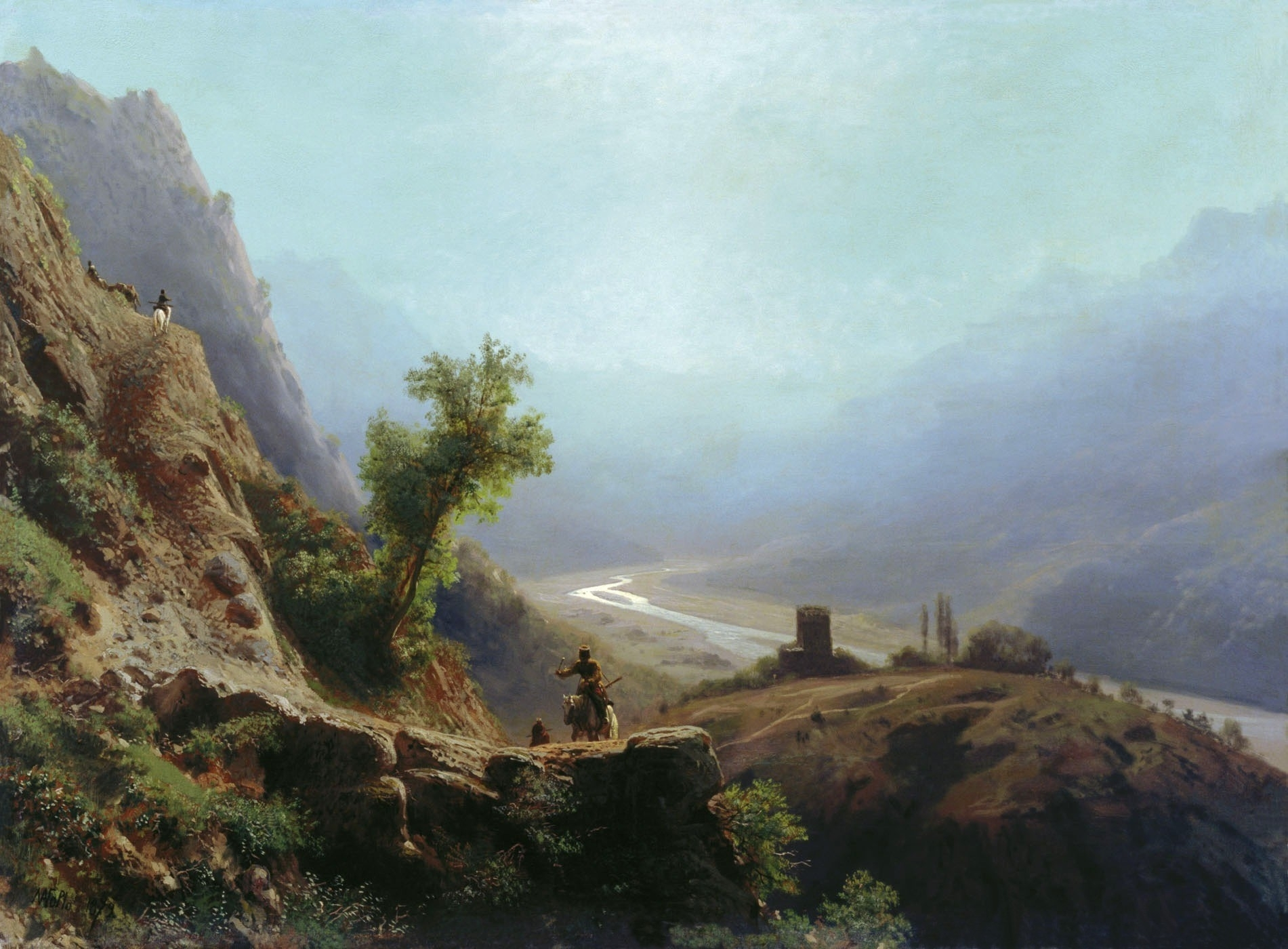
In the Caucasus Mountains, 1870

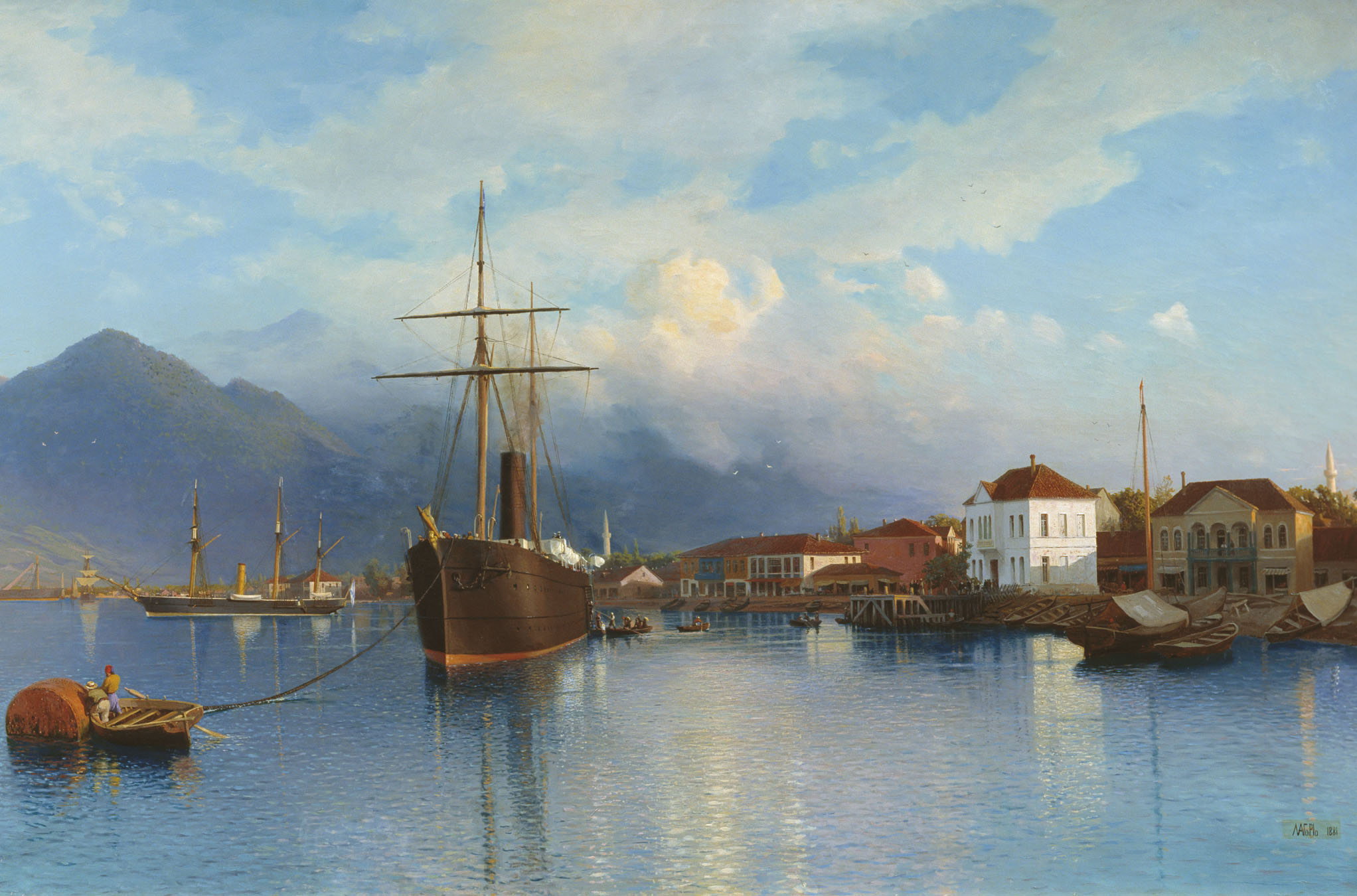
Batum, 1881

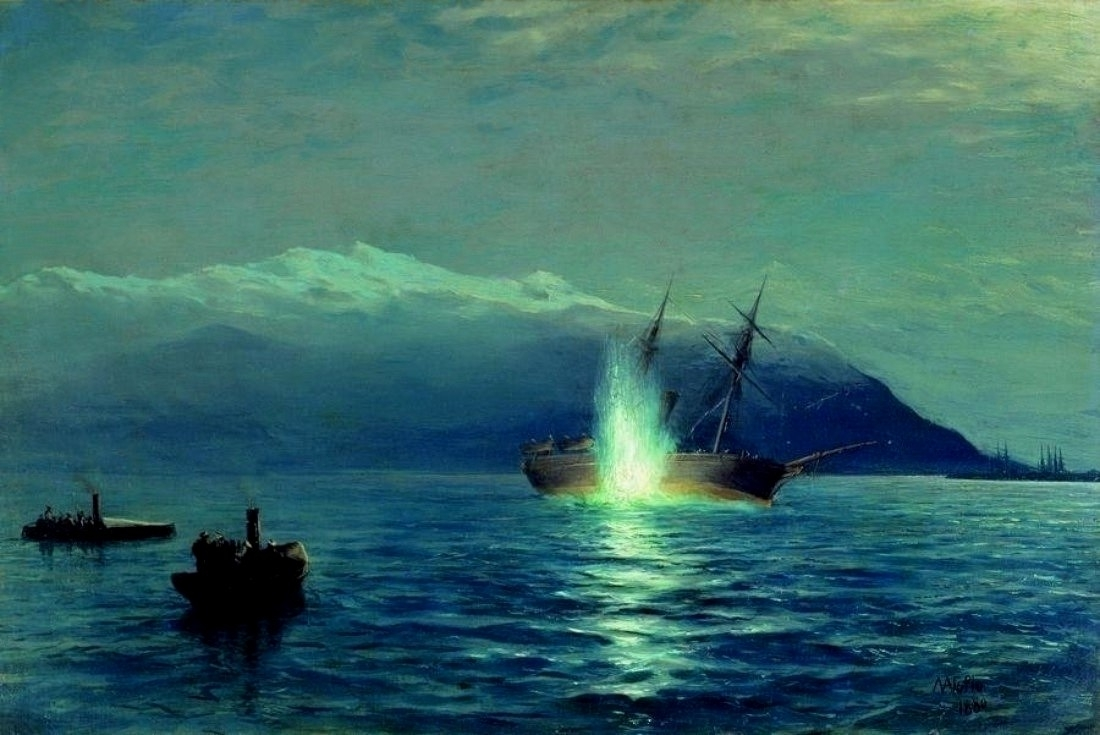
The Sinking of the Intibakh, 1880

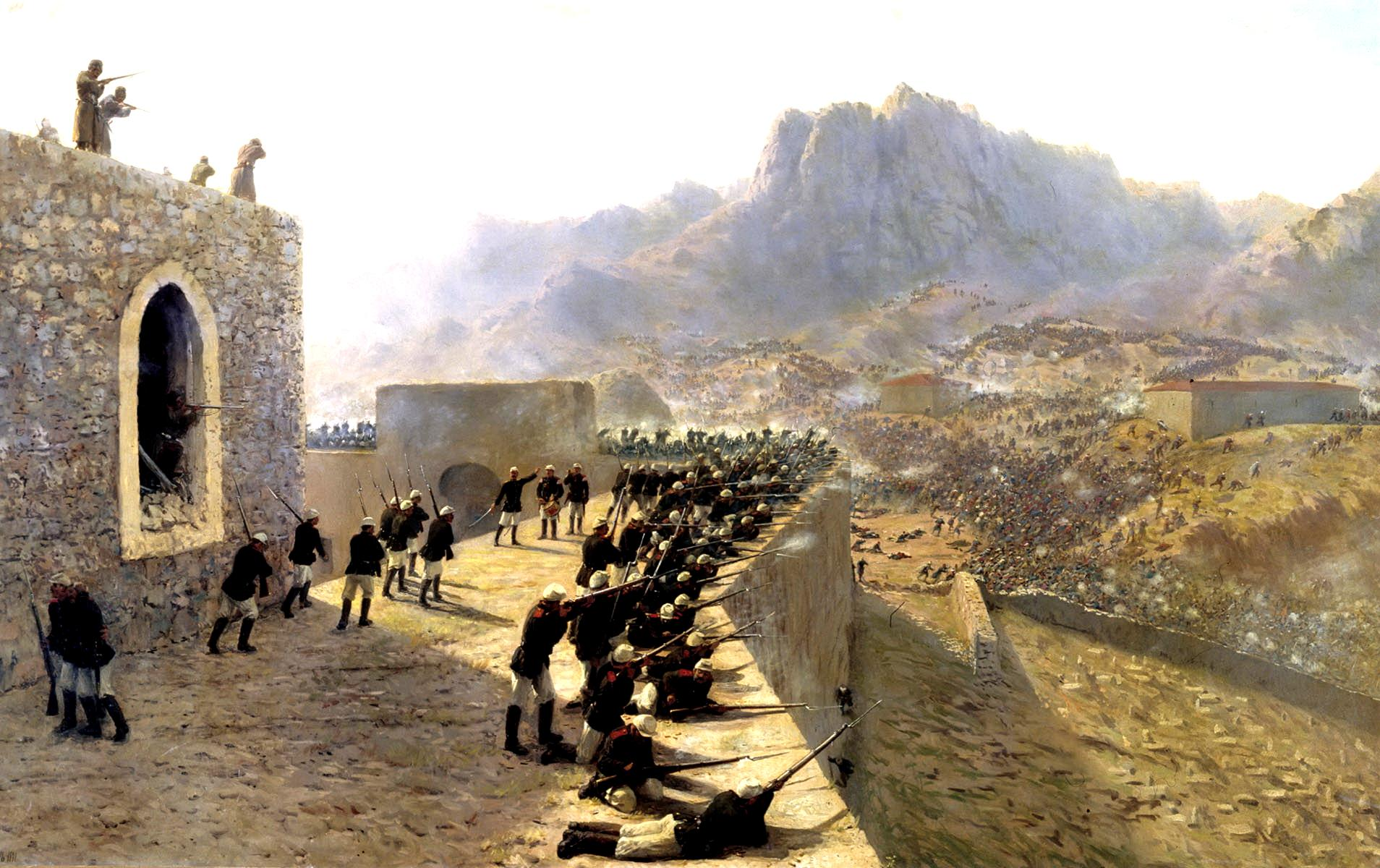
Defence of Bayezet during the
Russo-Turkish War, 1891

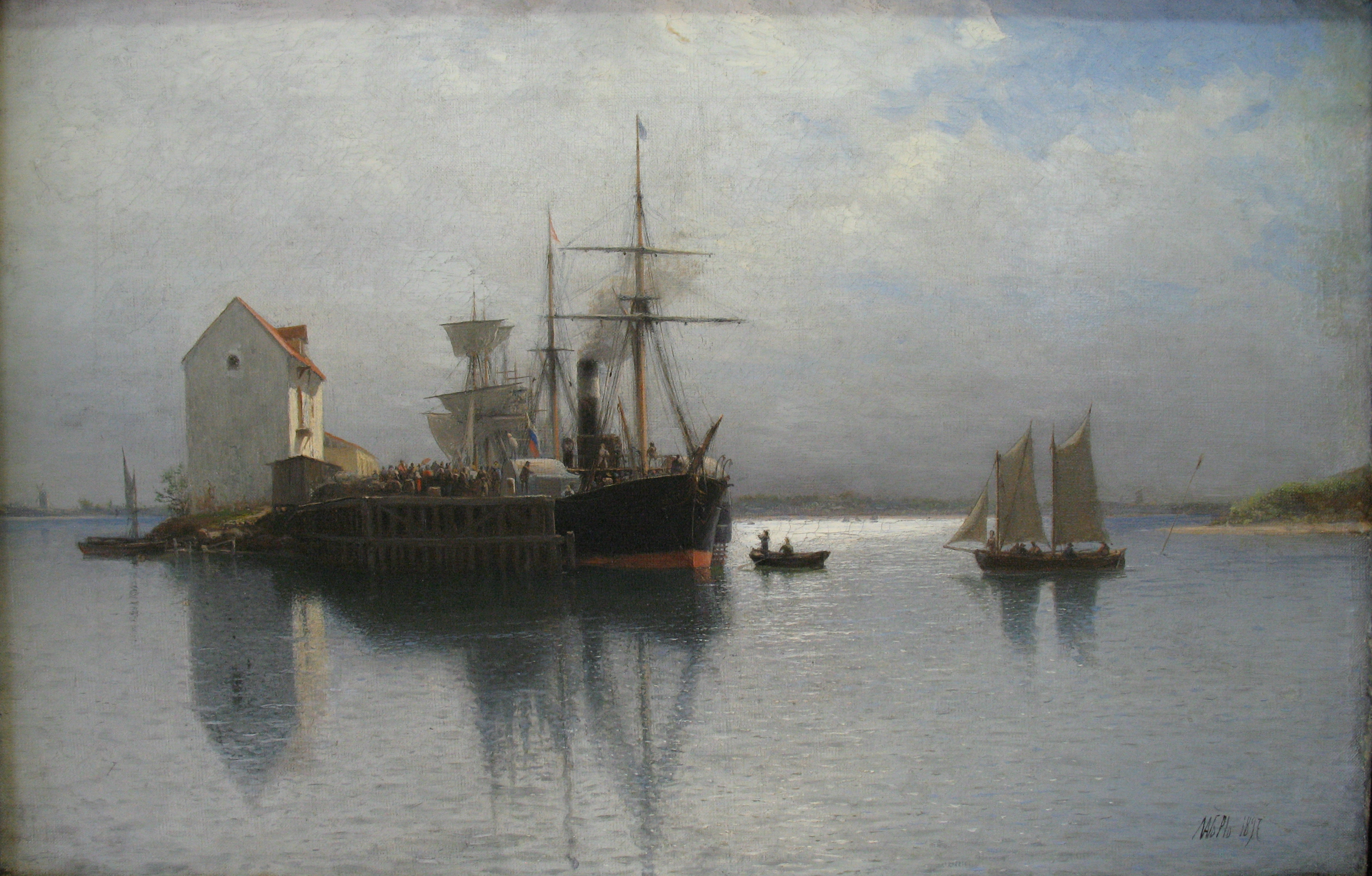
Seaside, 1897

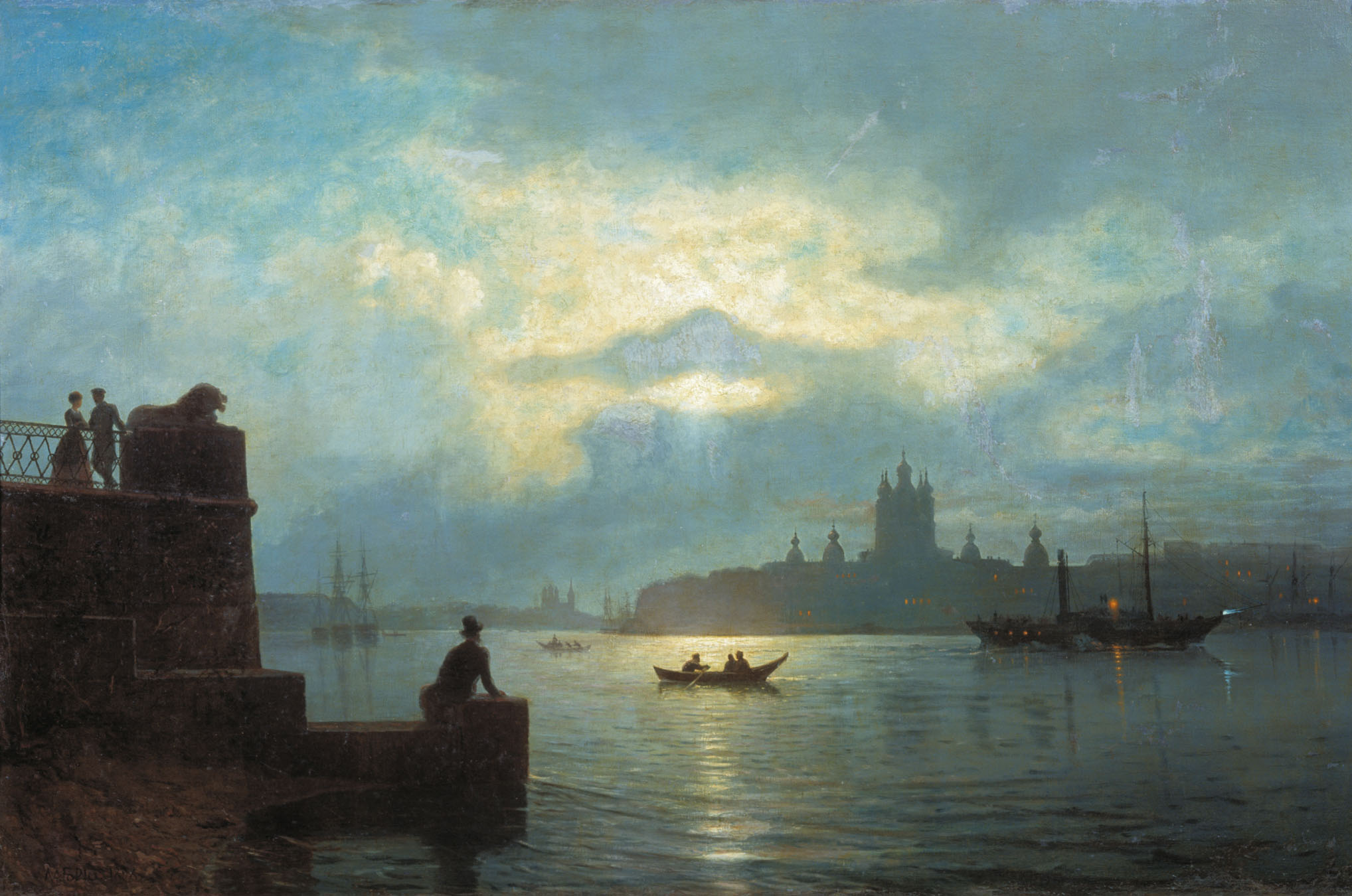
Moonlight on the Neva, 1898

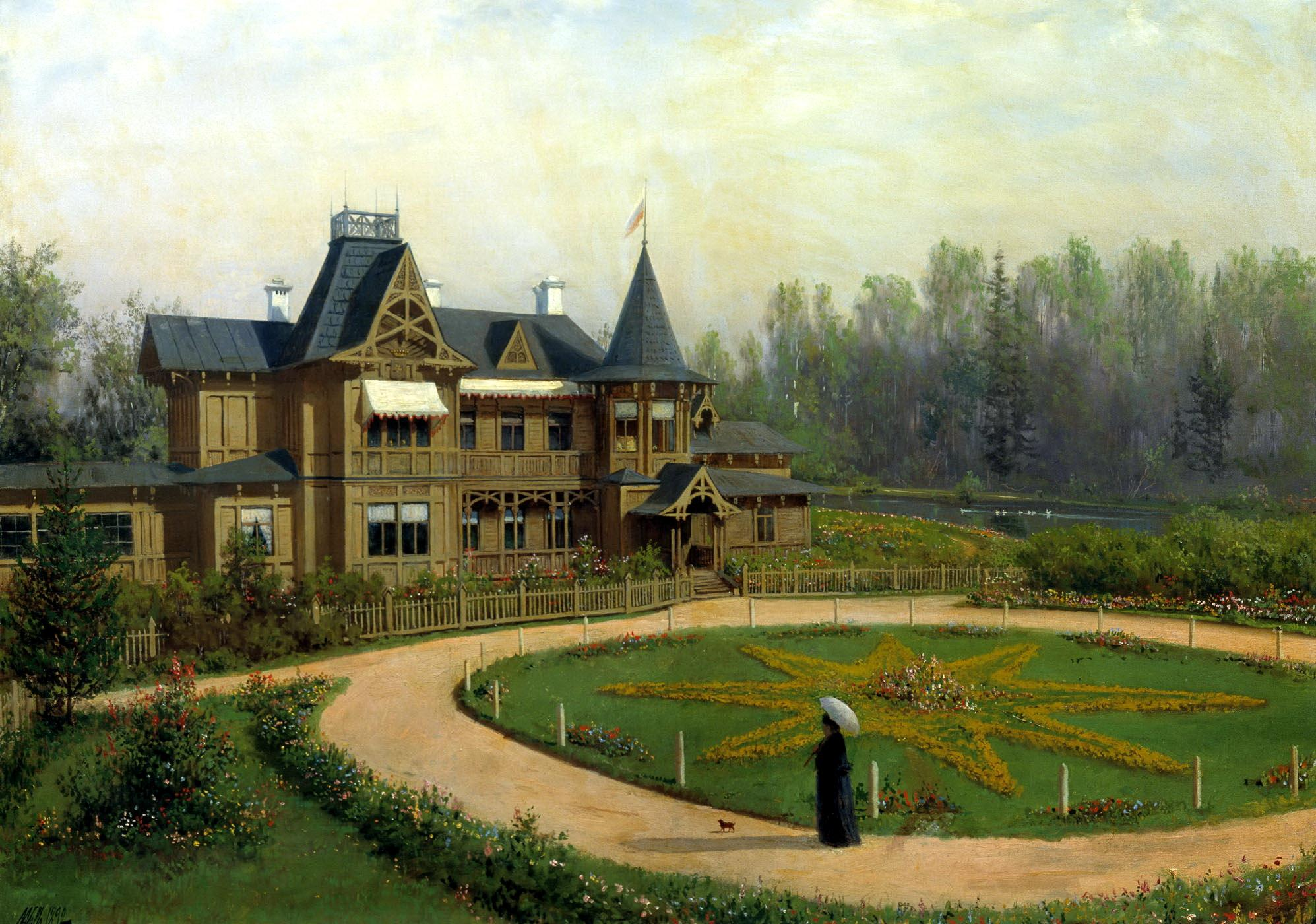
Dacha, 1892

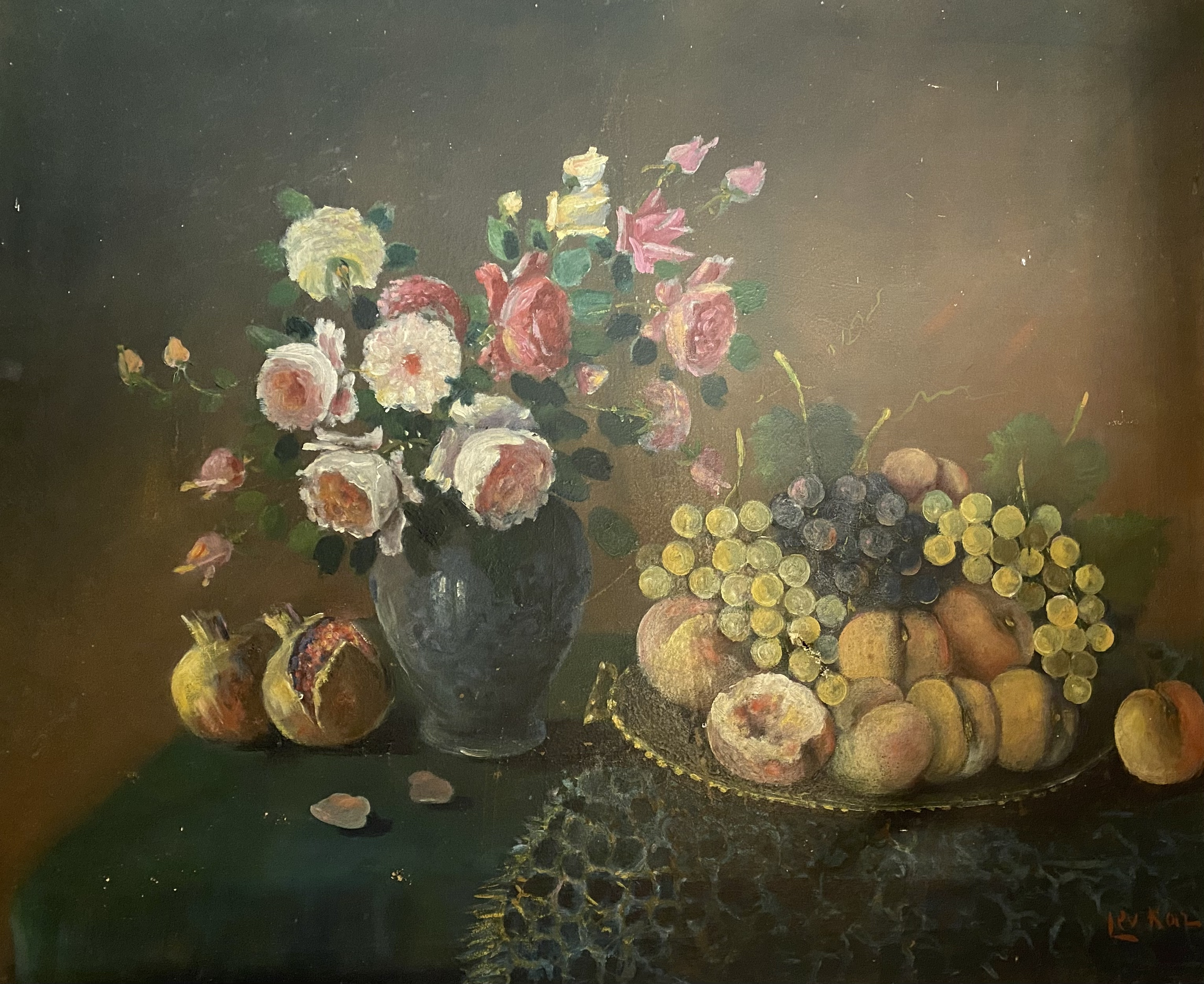
Fruits
