= Vereshchagin =

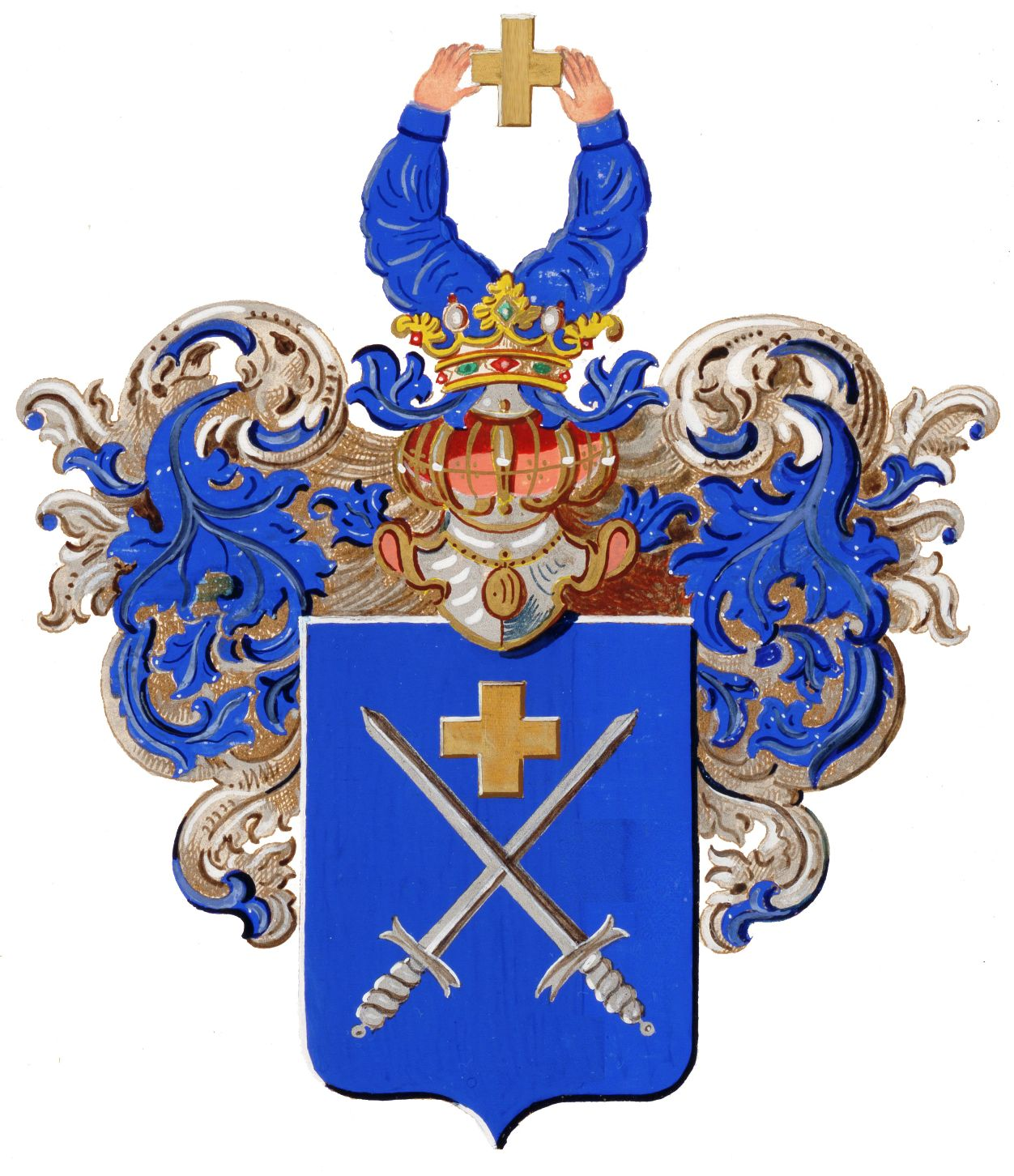
Coat of arms of the Vereshchagin noble family

Vereshchagin (Russian: Верещагин) is a Russian masculine surname, its feminine counterpart is Vereshchagina. It was also a name of an old Russian Boyar family.

== Notable surname bearers ==
- Pavel Vereshchagin, a character from the 1970 Soviet movie White Sun of the Desert
- Pyotr Vereshchagin (1834/36–1886), Russian landscape and cityscape painter
- Vasily Petrovich Vereshchagin (1835–1909), Russian portraitist, history painter and illustrator, brother of Pyotr
- Nikolay Vereshchagin (1839–1907), organizer of Russian cheese and butter industry
- Vasily Vereshchagin (1842–1904), Russian war painter, brother of Nikolay
  - The V. V. Vereshchagin Mykolaiv Art Museum
- Nikolai Kuzmich Vereshchagin (1908–2008), Russian zoologist who specialized in the study of mammoths and other Arctic paleofauna, grandson of the war painter Vasily Vereshchagin
- Igor Vereshchagin (born 1952), Russian music and street photographer.

== See also ==
- Vereshchagino
