= Vereshchagino =

Vereshchagino (Russian: Верещагино) is the name of several inhabited localities in Russia.

== Urban localities ==
- Vereshchagino, Vereshchaginsky District, Perm Krai, a town in Vereshchaginsky District of Perm Krai

== Rural localities ==
=== Ivanovo Oblast ===
- Vereshchagino, Kineshemsky District, Ivanovo Oblast, a village in Kineshemsky District
- Vereshchagino, Pestyakovsky District, Ivanovo Oblast, a village in Pestyakovsky District
- Vereshchagino, Puchezhsky District, Ivanovo Oblast, a village in Puchezhsky District

=== Yaroslavl Oblast ===
- Vereshchagino, Poshekhonsky District, Yaroslavl Oblast, a village in Leninsky Rural Okrug of Poshekhonsky District
- Vereshchagino, Tutayevsky District, Yaroslavl Oblast, a selo in Nikolsky Rural Okrug of Tutayevsky District

=== Other oblasts ===
- Vereshchagino, Kirov Oblast, a village under the administrative jurisdiction of Oktyabrsky City District of the City of Kirov in Kirov Oblast; 58°40′N 49°35′E
- Vereshchagino, Krasnoyarsk Krai, a selo in Turukhansky District of Krasnoyarsk Krai
- Vereshchagino, Lipetsk Oblast, a village in Krivetsky Selsoviet of Dobrovsky District in Lipetsk Oblast
- Vereshchagino, Moscow Oblast, a village in Dorokhovskoye Rural Settlement of Orekhovo-Zuyevsky District in Moscow Oblast; 55°36′N 39°21′E
- Vereshchagino, Ochyorsky District, Perm Krai, a village in Ochyorsky District of Perm Krai
- Vereshchagino, Vladimir Oblast, a village in Kameshkovsky District of Vladimir Oblast
- Vereshchagino, Vologda Oblast, a village in Bechevinsky Selsoviet of Belozersky District in Vologda Oblast
