= Pyotr Vereshchagin =

Russian painter

- Пётр Петрович Верещагин
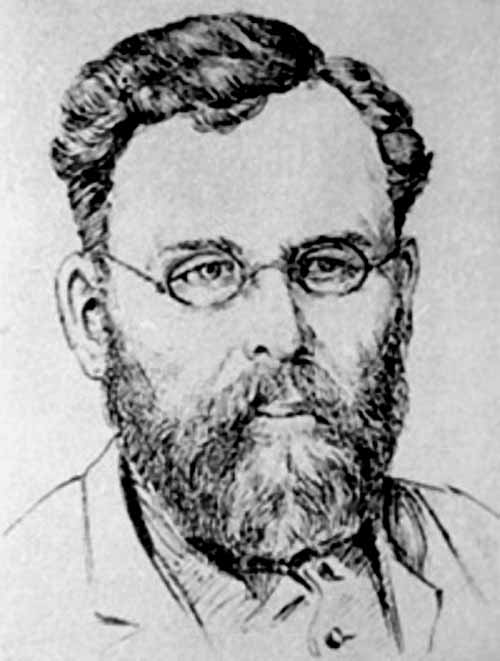
- Pyotr Vereshchagin (artist unknown)
- Born: January 14, 1834; Perm
- Died: January 16, 1886 (aged 52); Perm
- Education: Member Academy of Arts (1873)
- Alma mater: Imperial Academy of Arts (1865)
- Known for: Painting

Pyotr Petrovich Vereshchagin (Note: In this name that follows East Slavic naming customs, the patronymic is Petrovich and the family name is Vereshchagin.) (Russian: Пётр Петрович Верещагин; 14 January 1834/36 in Perm – 16 January 1886 in Perm) was a Russian landscape and cityscape painter in the Academic style. He was the first to paint plein-air in the wilderness of the Urals.

== Biography ==
His father, Pyotr Prokopovich (1795–1843) and grandfather, Prokopy Danilovich (1764-c.1811) were painters. His brothers, Vasily and Mitrofan (1842–1894) became painters as well. He was not related to the well-known military painter, Vasily Vasilyevich Vereshchagin.

His father was his first teacher. Later he studied with his maternal grandfather, a local icon painter named Ivan Babin. From 1858 to 1865, he was enrolled at the Imperial Academy of Arts, where his most influential instructor was Sokrat Vorobiev, a landscape painter who had spent many years in Italy.

His first exhibition came at the Academy in 1860 and he later received several silver medals. During these years, he also exhibited paintings of cityscapes, ranging from Moscow to Tallinn. He graduated as an "Artist, 3rd Degree" and worked as a teacher in Ludza; then part of the Vilna Governorate. In 1870, he gave up teaching and travelled for a year, painting. After that, he returned to Saint Petersburg. In 1873, he was named an "Academician".

He later exhibited internationally, as well as in Russia, participating in the Centennial Exposition in Philadelphia and the Exposition Universelle (1878) in Paris. In 1875 and 1876 he also worked for the Ural Railway Network, sketching scenes along the Chusovaya River, in preparation for extending the railway there. During the Russo-Turkish War, he painted with Russian troops in the Balkans and, on his return, created a panorama of the bombardment of the fortress at Ruse.

== Selected paintings ==
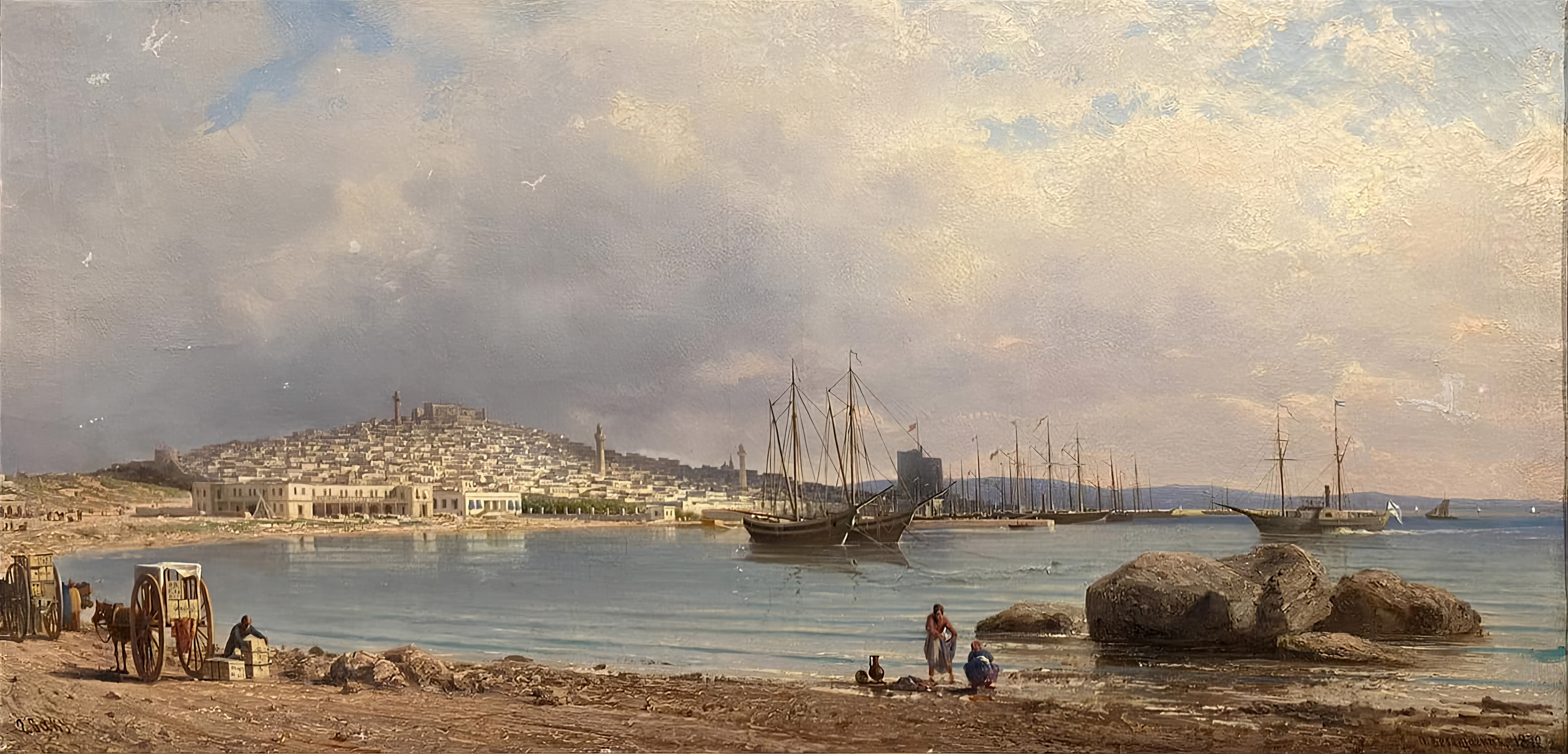
View of Baku from the sea (1872), National Art Museum of Azerbaijan

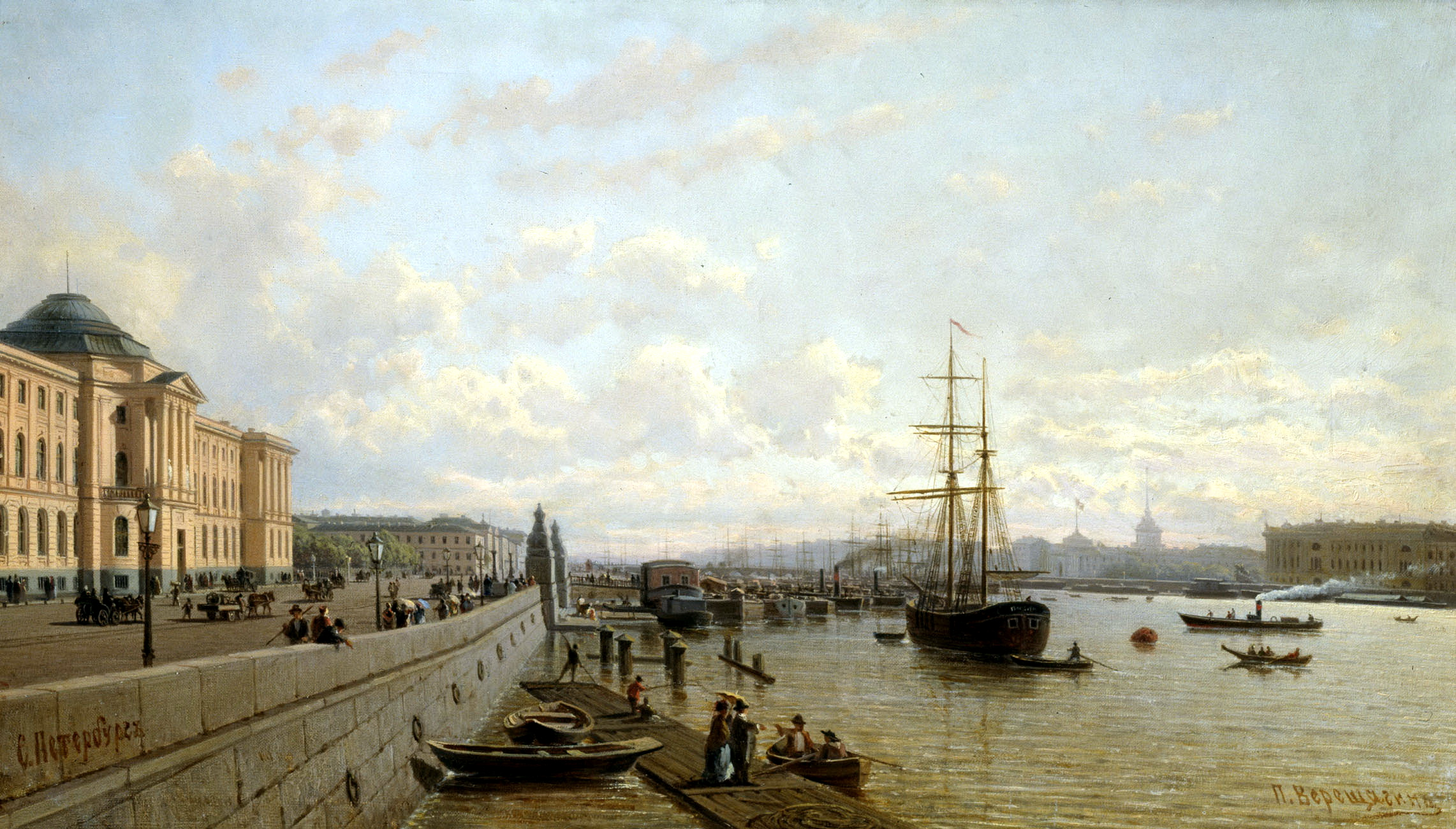
Neva Embankment, St. Petersburg

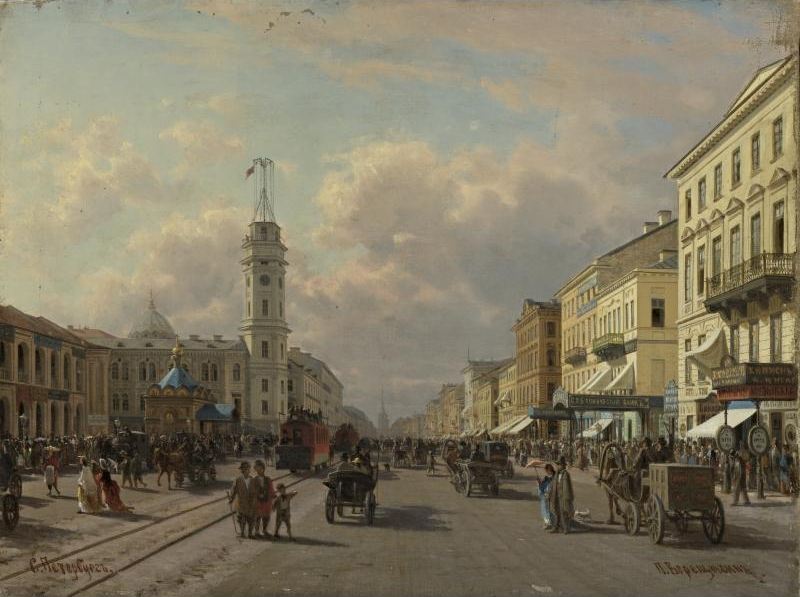
A view of Nevsky Prospekt in St. Petersburg

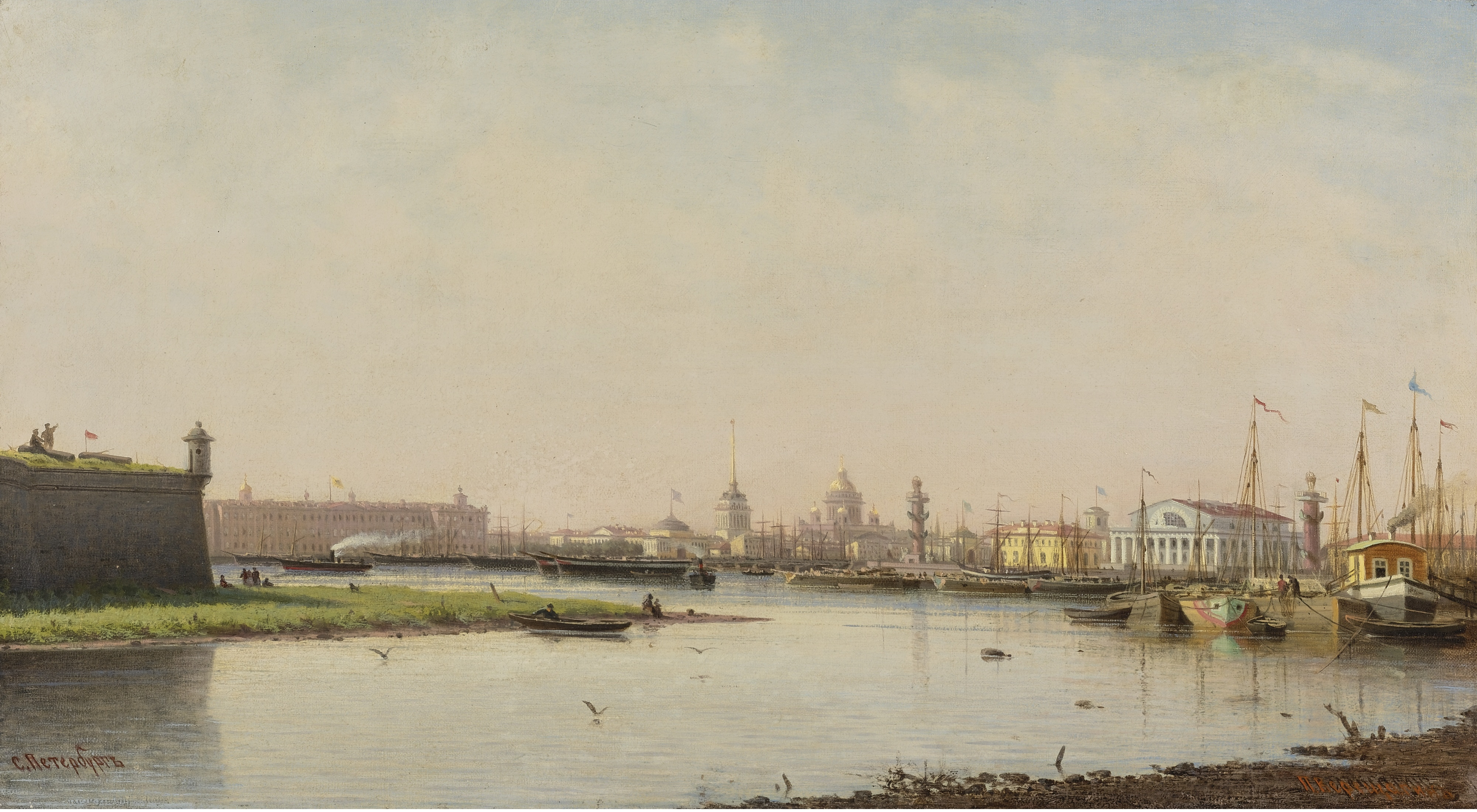
View of St. Petersburg

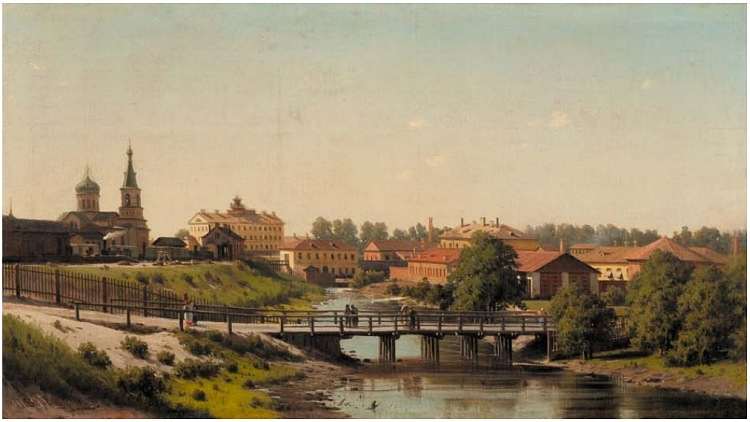
View of Melekkes (Dimitrovgrad today)

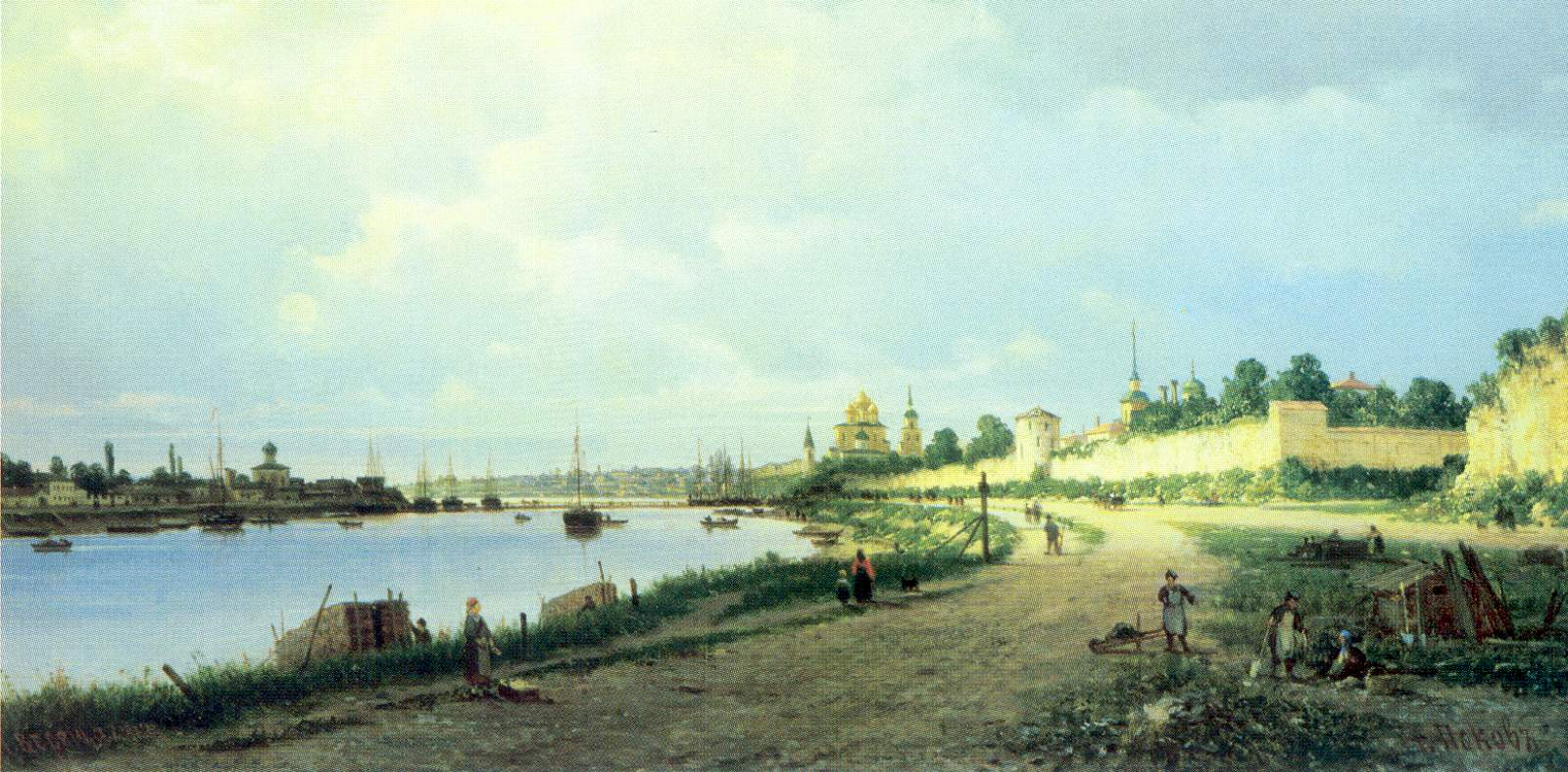
Pskov (1876)

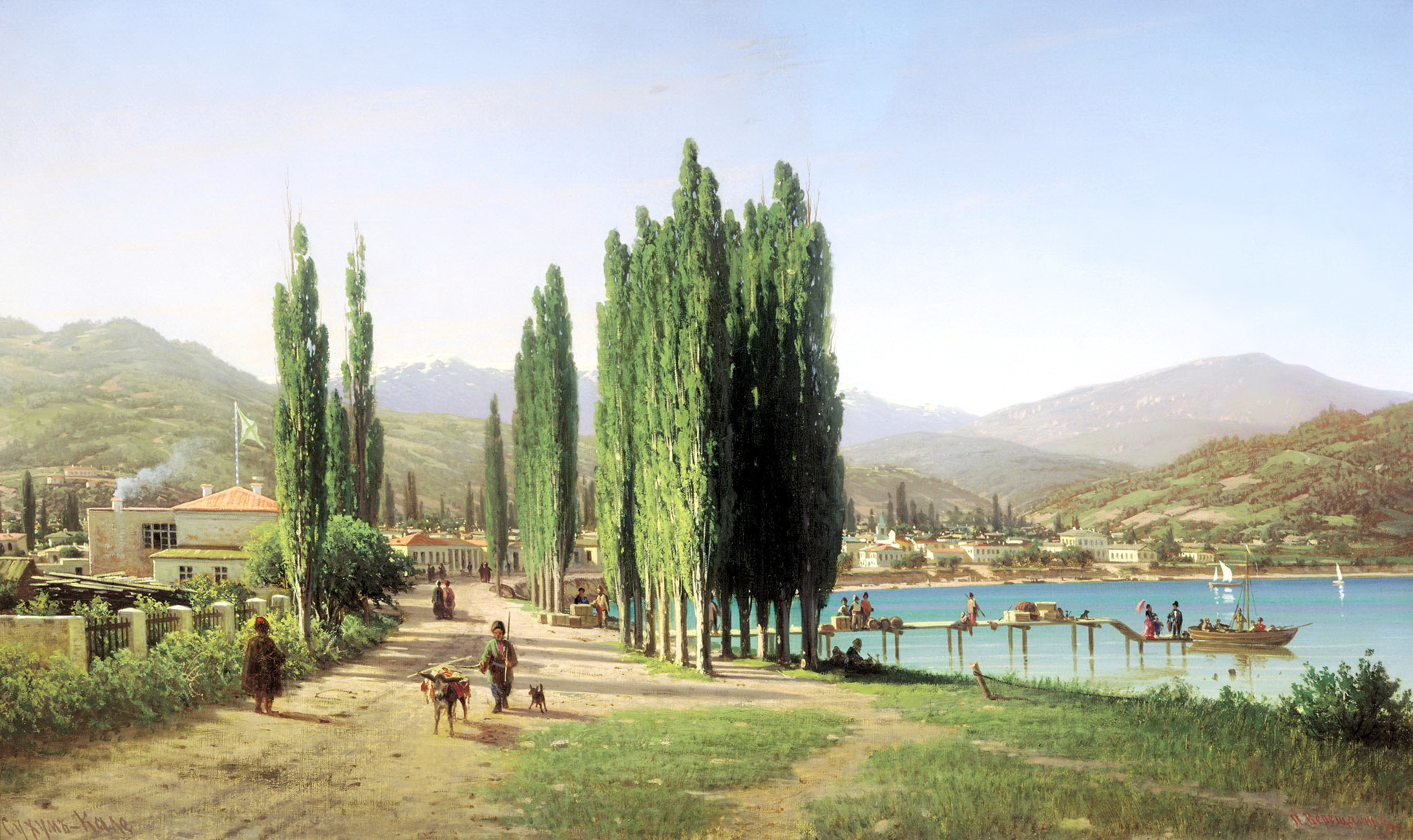
Sukhumi

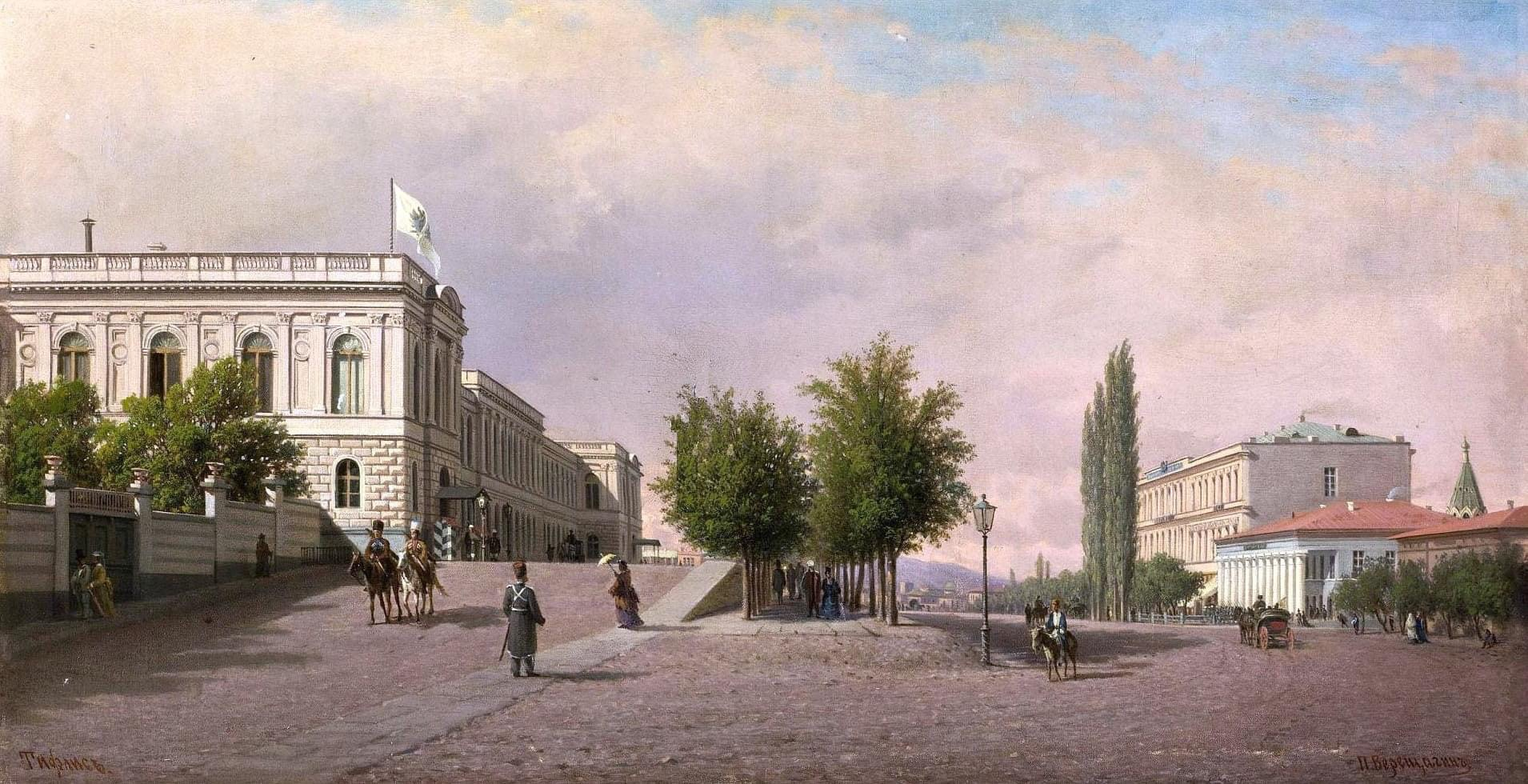
Viceroy's Palace, Tiflis

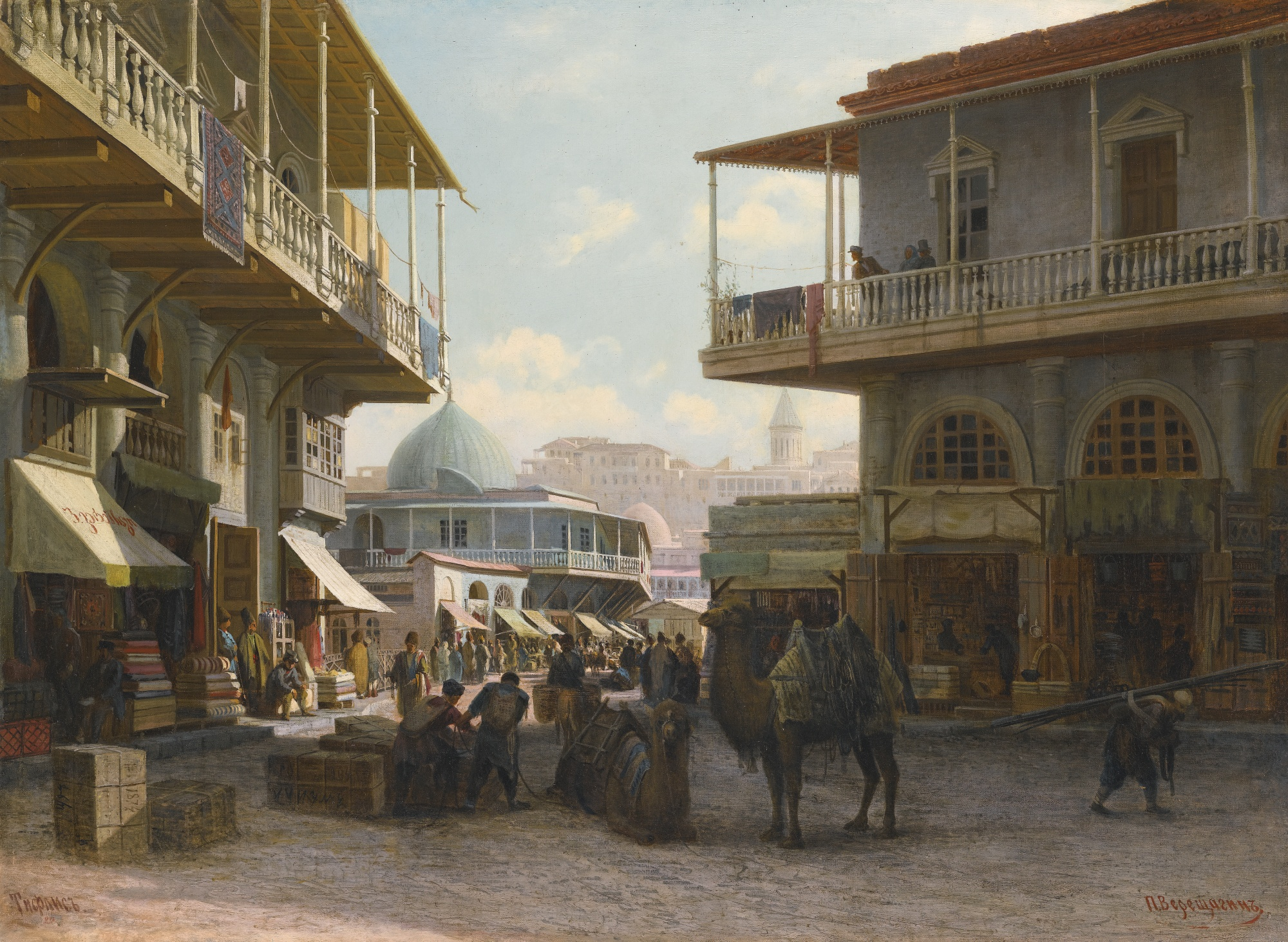
View of Tiflis

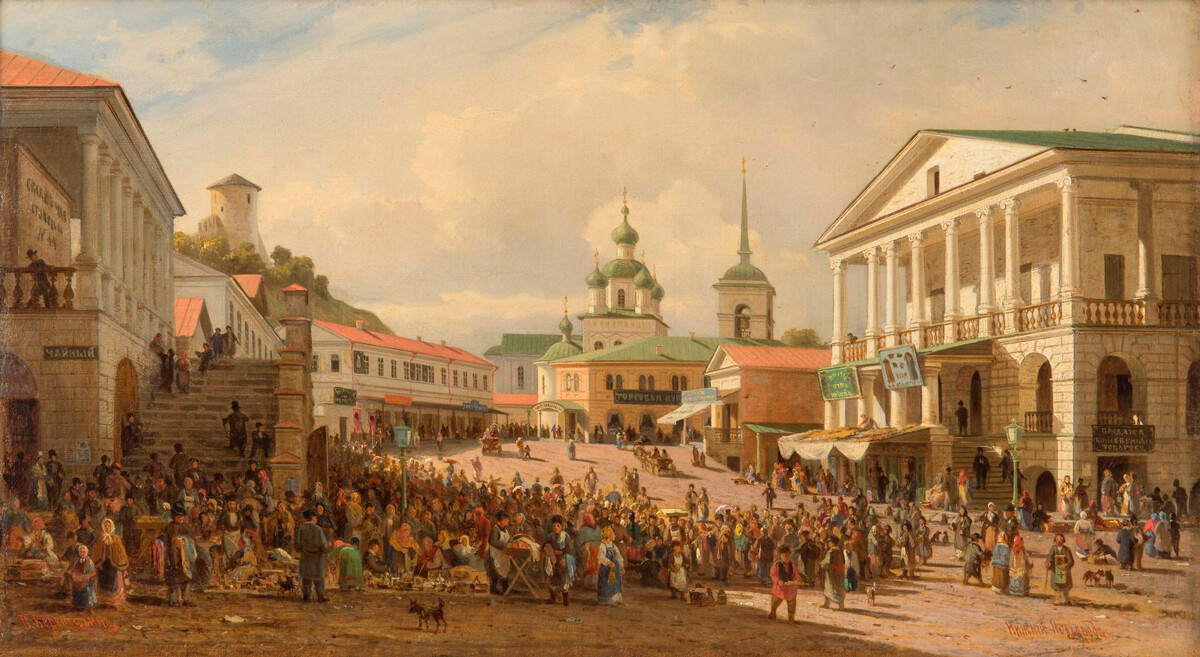
Lower Bazaar in Nizhny Novgorod (1860s), Gorky Museum

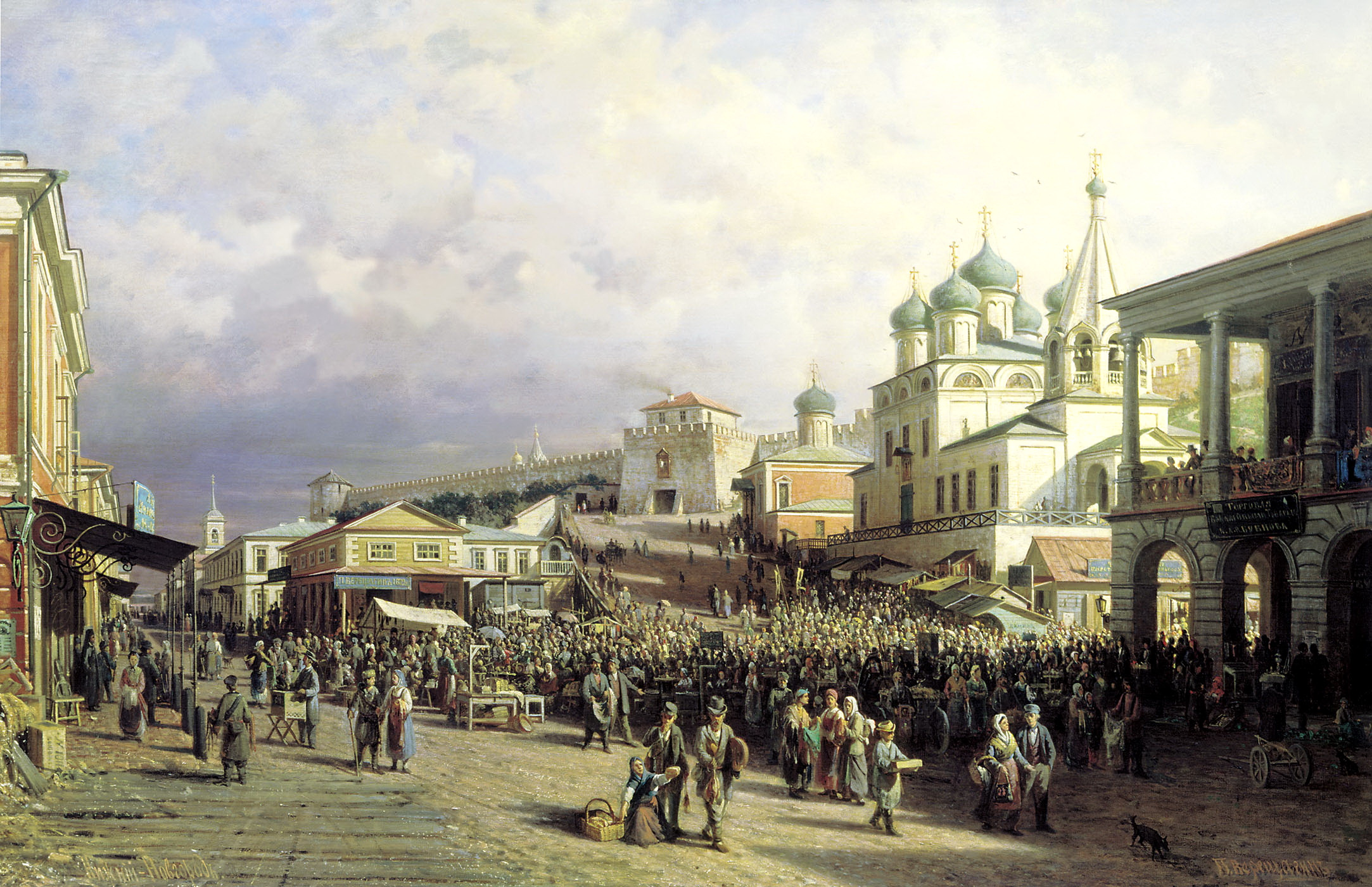
The Market in Nizhny Novgorod

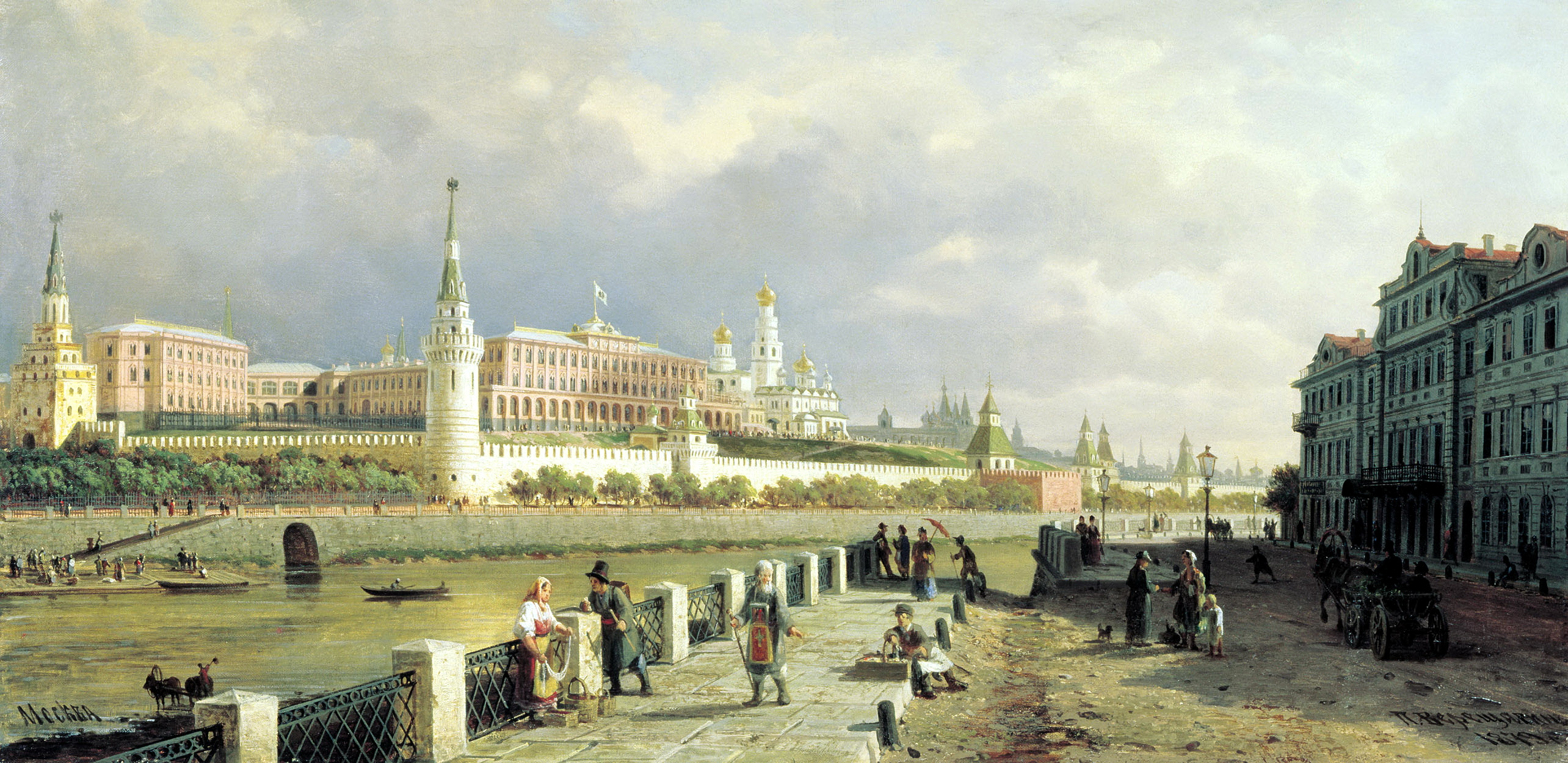
View of the Moscow Kremlin (1879), Yaroslavl Art Museum

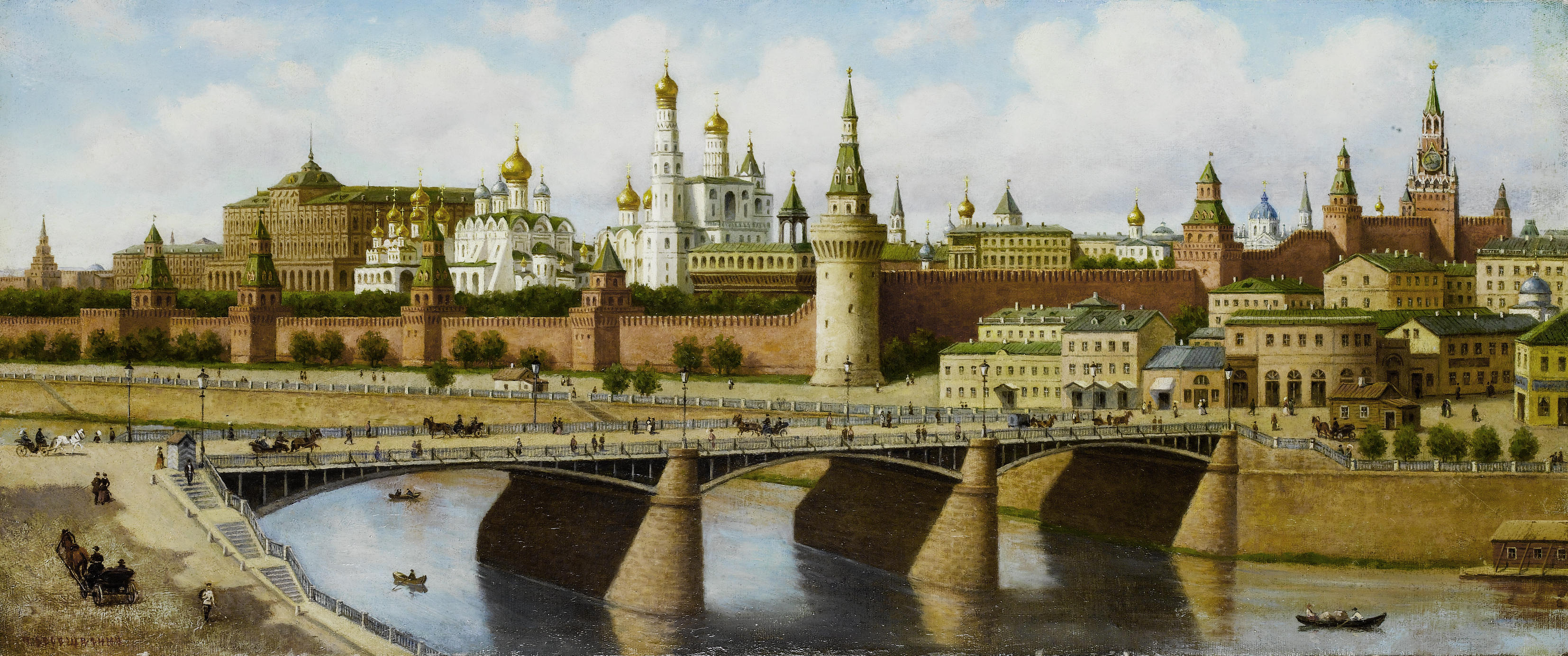
View of the Kremlin from the Moskvoretsky Bridge

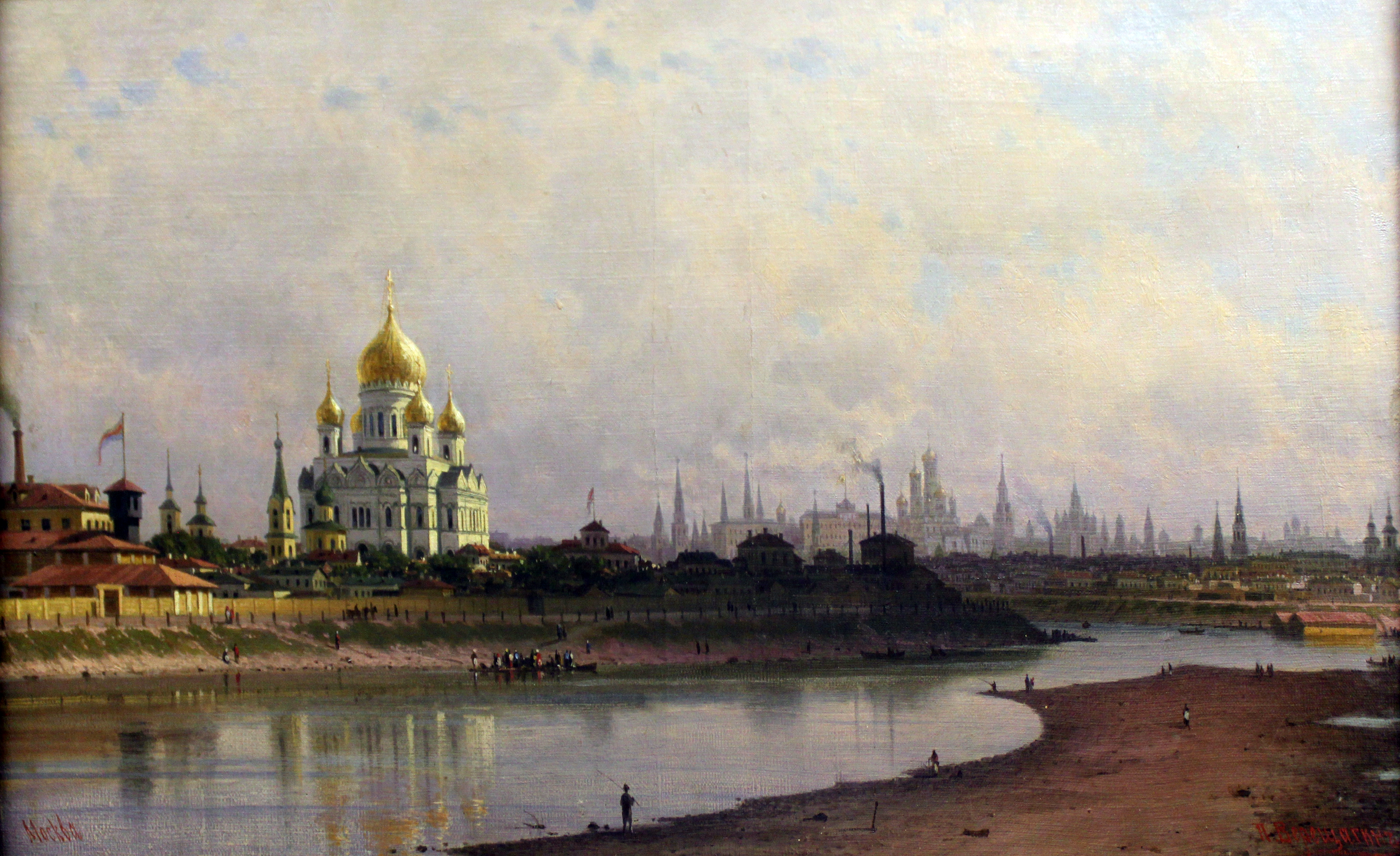
Old Moscow (1878), Yekaterinburg Museum of Fine Arts

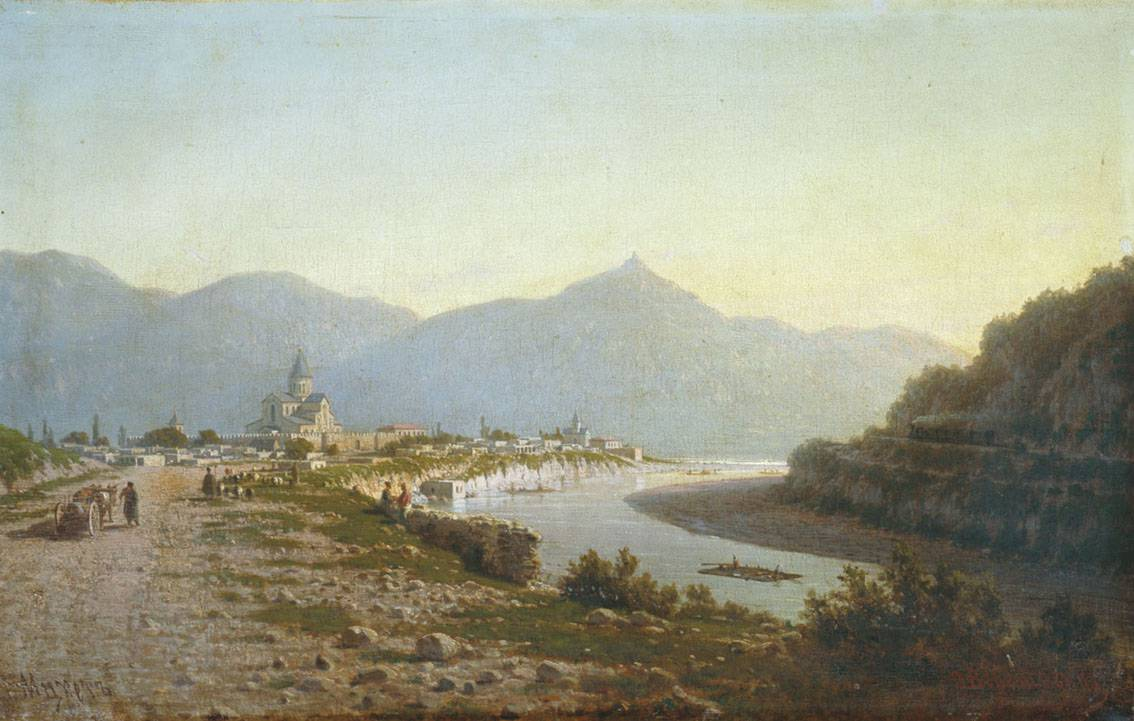
View of Mtskheta (1900)

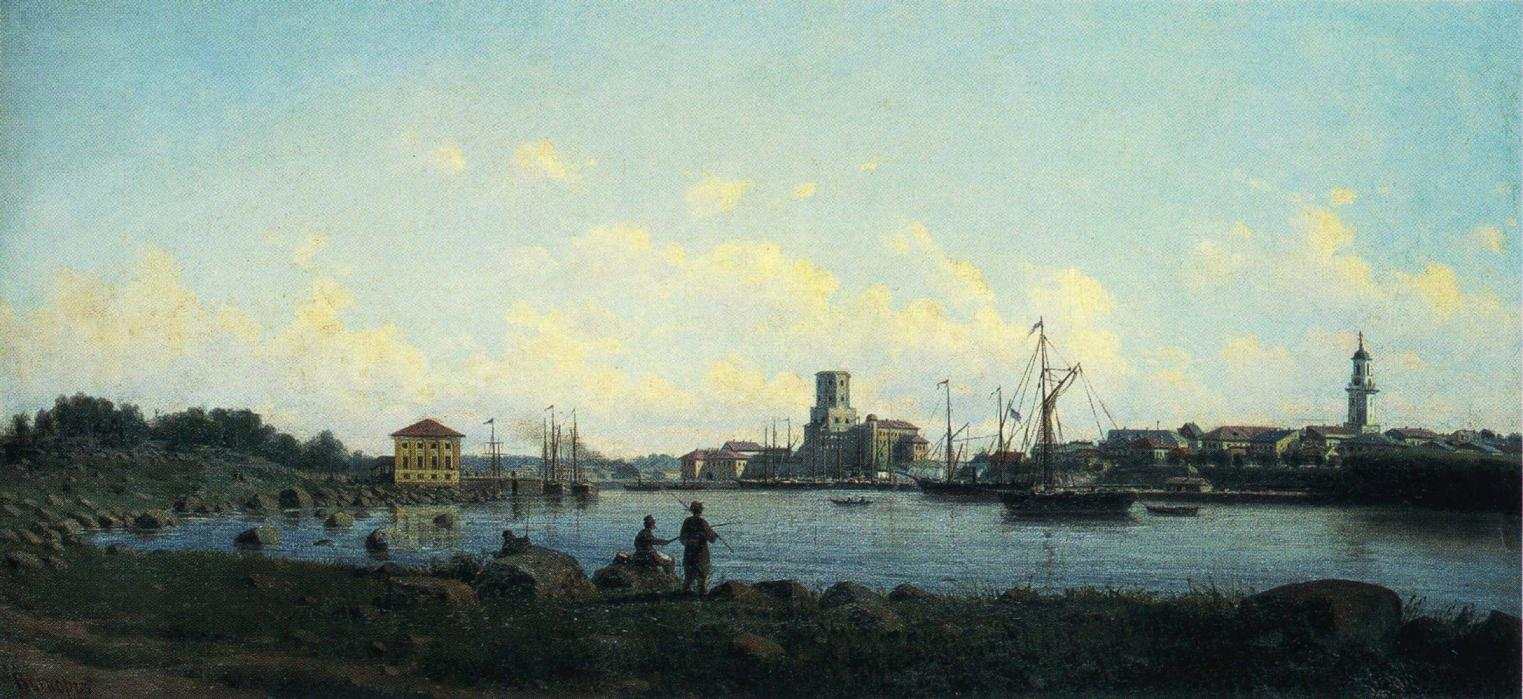
Harbour of Vyborg

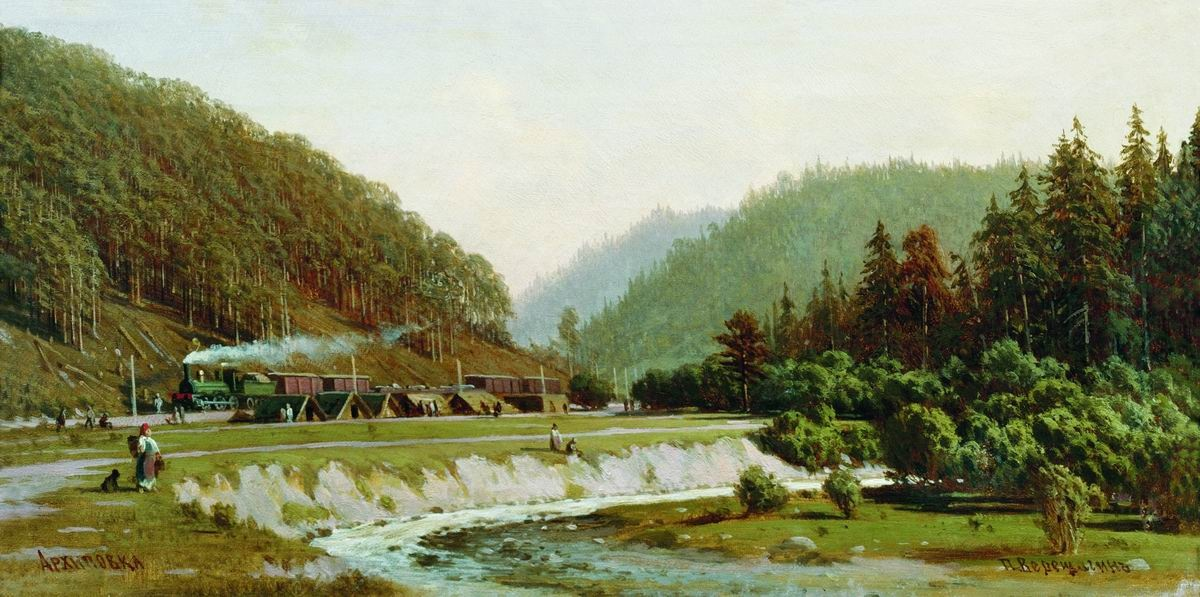
Arkhipovka (1876), Perm Art Museum

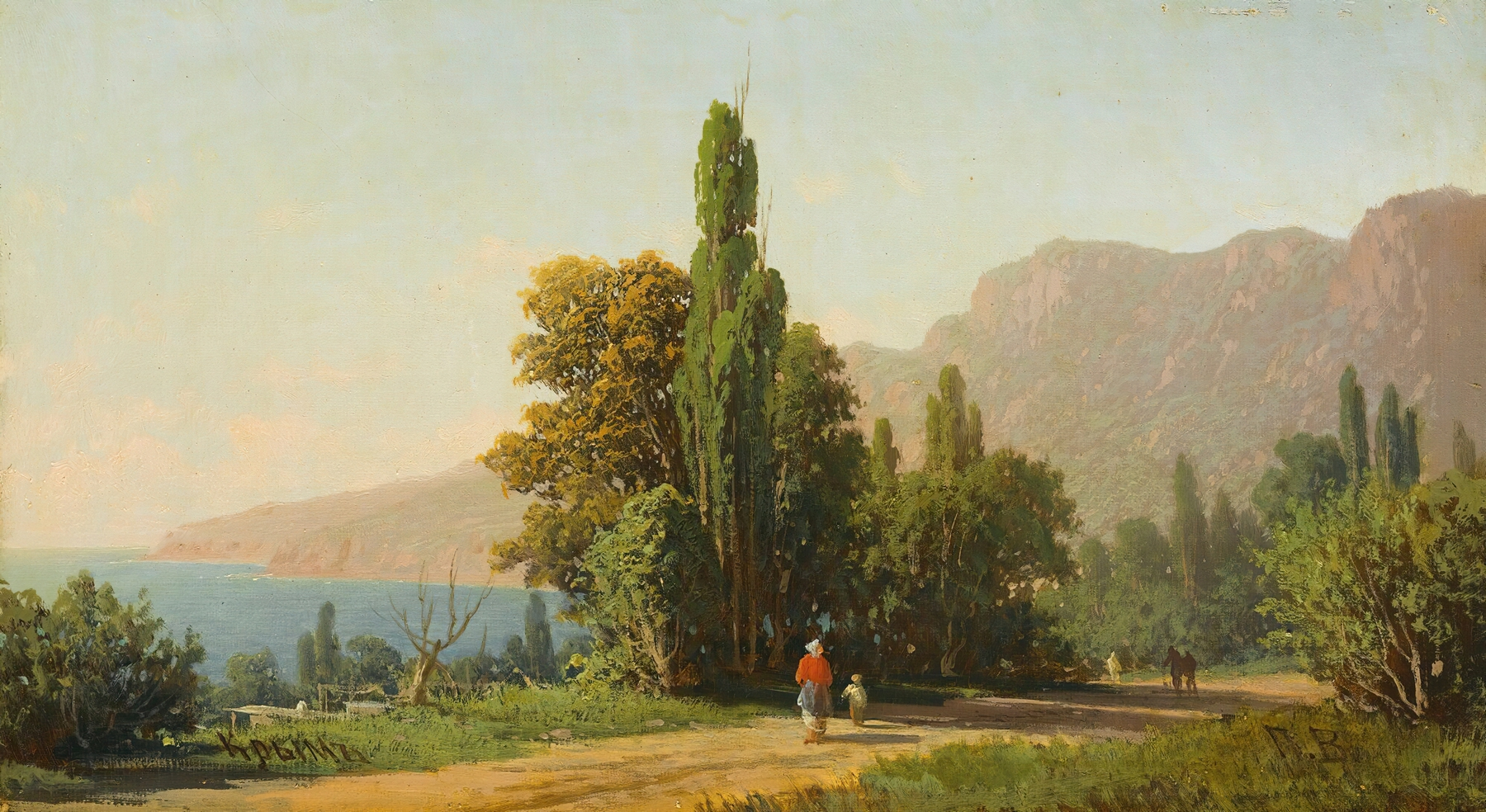
View of Ai-Petri (1883)

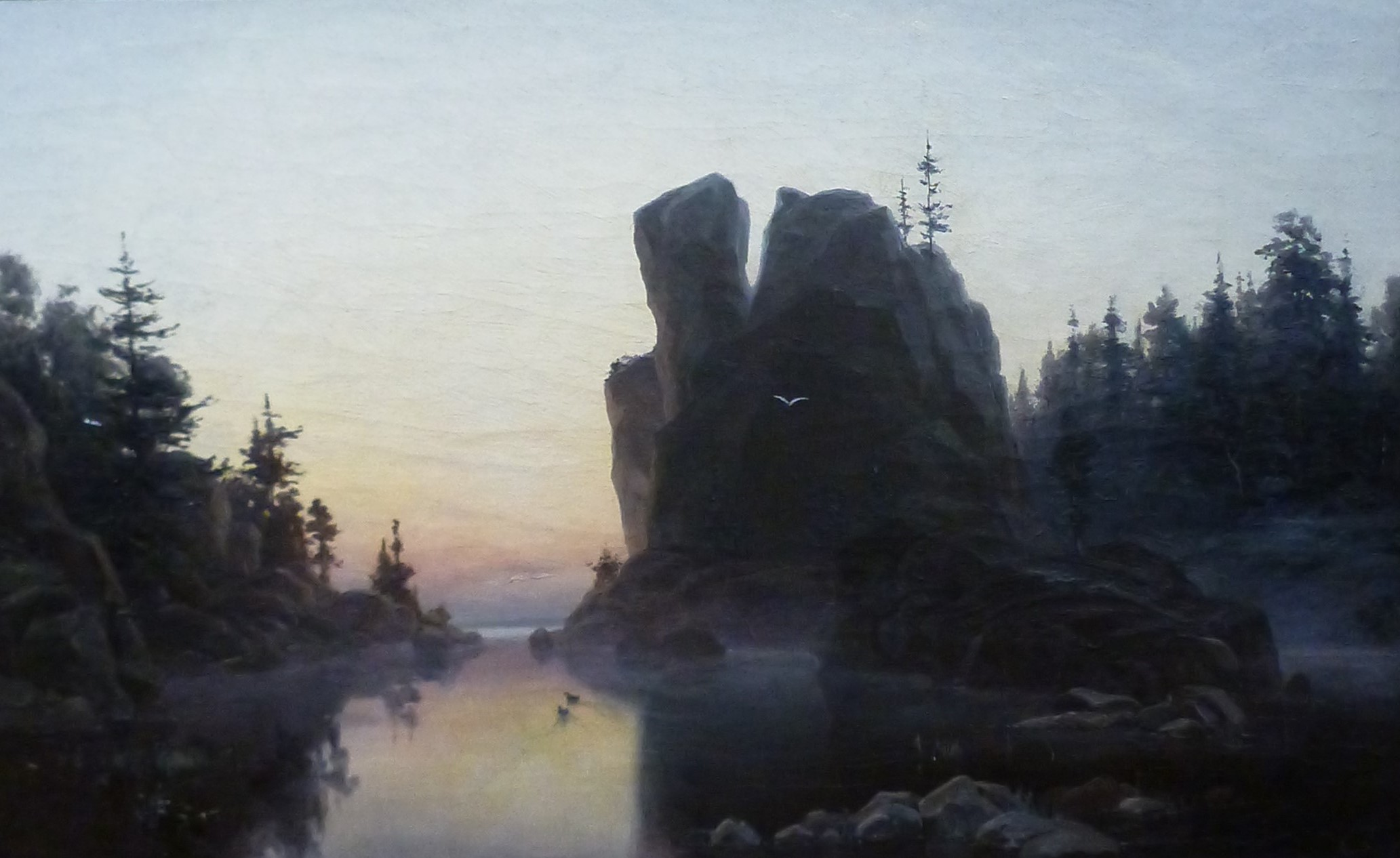
Kamen' Molokov (1877)

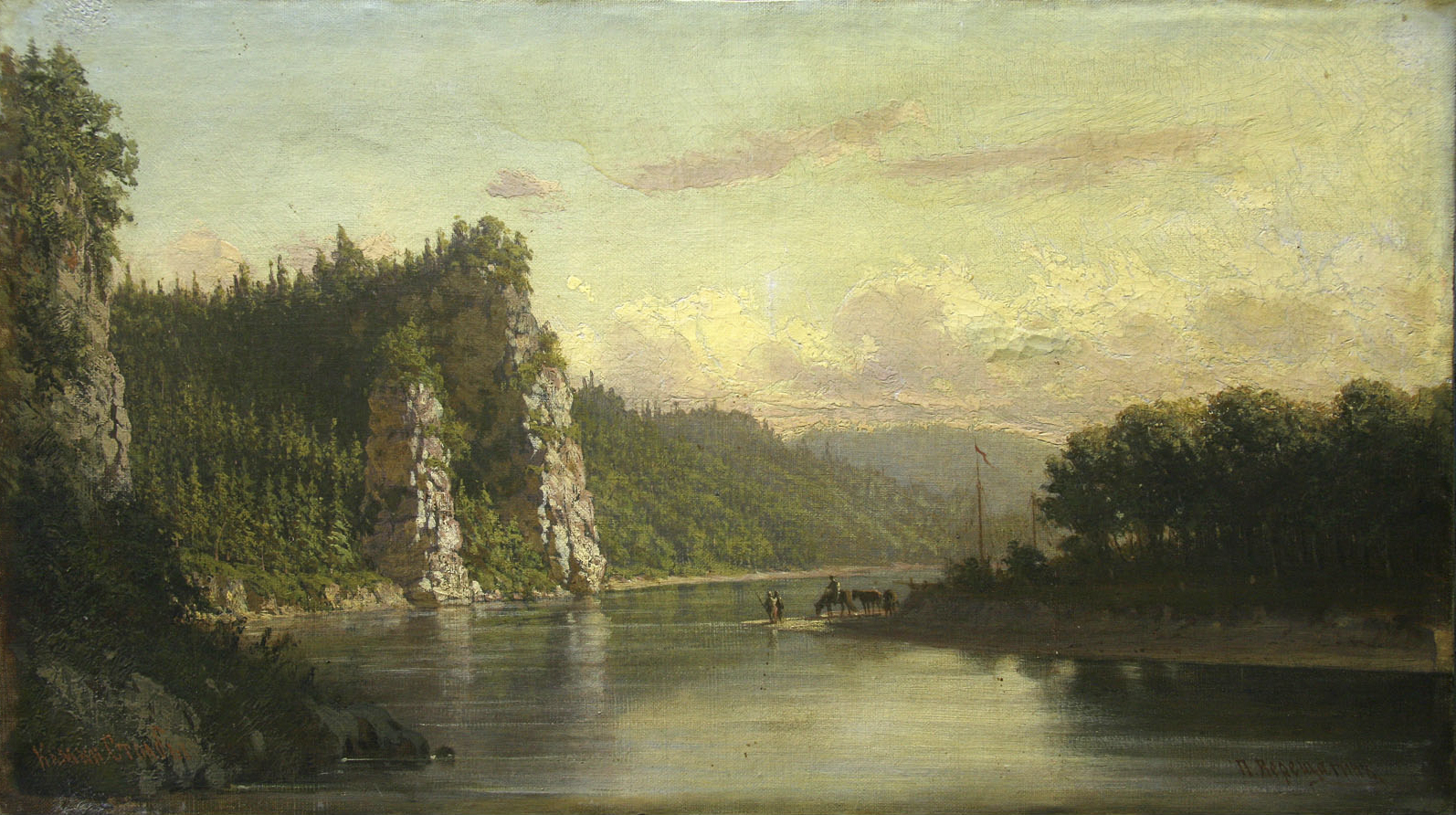
Pillar Stones

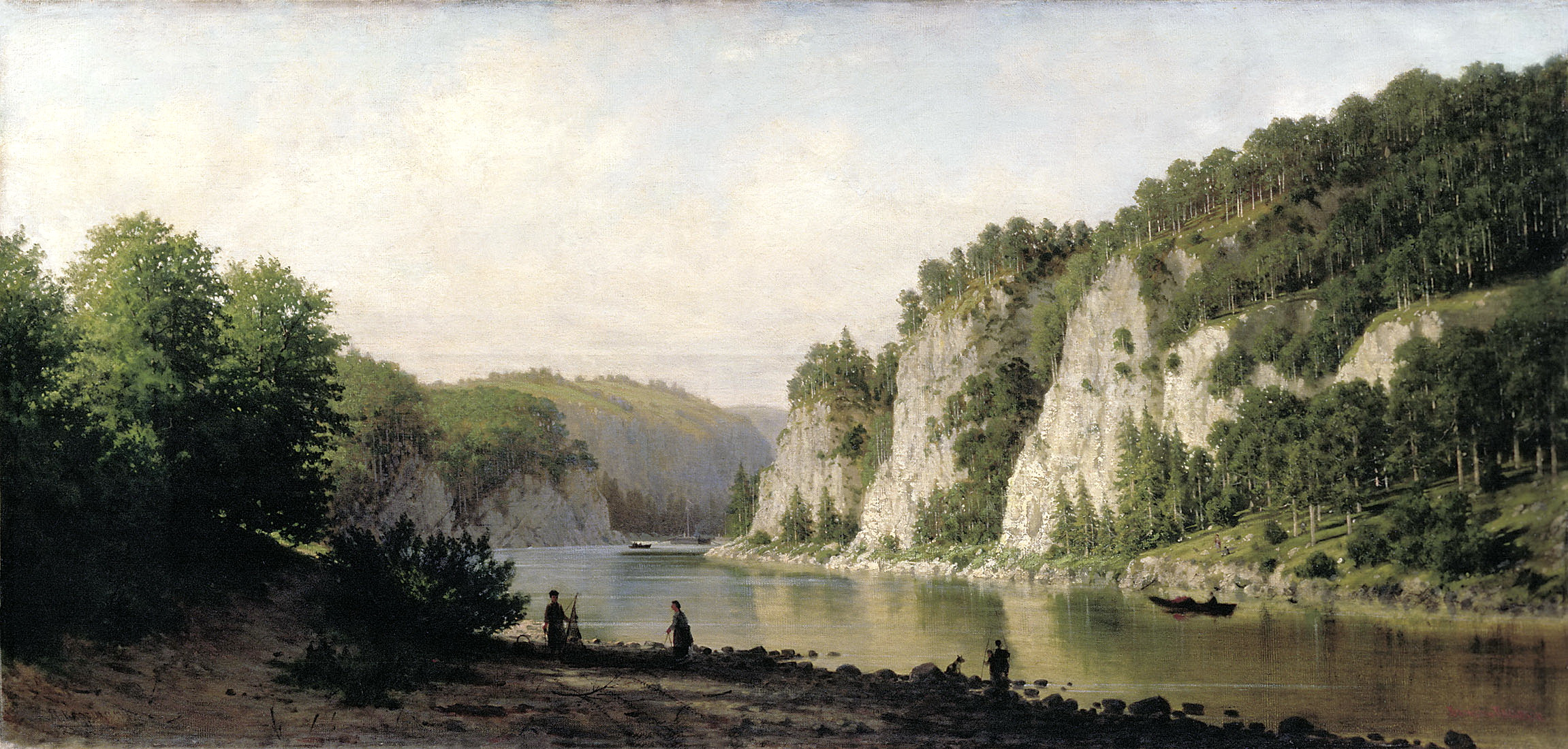
Pisanny Stone on the Chusovaya River

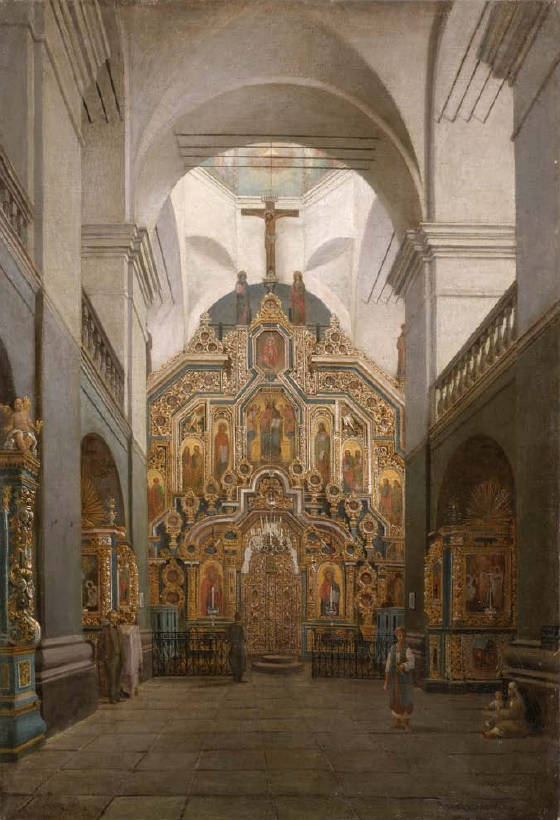
Interior of the Mezhyhirya Monastery

== Literature ==
- С. Н. Кондаков (1915). Юбилейный справочник Императорской Академии художеств. 1764-1914 (in Russian). Vol. 2. p. 36.
