= Nikolay Vereshchagin =

Russian entrepreneur

- Николай Верещагин
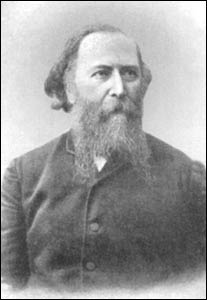
- Pronunciation: nʲikʌɭˈɑj vʲirʲiɕˈɑɡʲin
- Born: October 25, 1839; Cherepovets, Novgorod Governorate, Russian Empire
- Died: March 26, 1907 (aged 67); Pertovka estate, (Note: The area was flooded during the creation of Rybinsk Reservoir.) Cherepovetsky Uyezd, Novgorod Governorate, Russian Empire
- Education: Naval Cadet Corps (1856)
- Occupations: Entrepreneurship; Cheesemaking; Buttermaking
- Years active: 1866–1898
- Known for: being one of the organisers of mass cheese and butter production in Russia
- Family: Vereshchagin

Nikolay Vasilyevich Vereshchagin (Note: In this name that follows East Slavic naming customs, the patronymic is Vasilyevich and the family name is Vereshchagin.) (Russian: Николай Васильевич Верещагин, romanized: Nikolay Vasil'yevič Vereŝagin; 25 October [O.S. 13 October] 1839 – 26 March [O.S. 13 March] 1907) was a Russian entrepreneur who belonged to the organisers of the mass Russian cheese and butter industry; a rural manager-practitioner known for his labours to improve the homegrown dairy farming industry, founder of the first Russian artel cheese factories. A nobleman.

== Biography ==
In 1850 Nikolai entered the Naval Cadet Corps at his father's behest, and graduated from it. He became a midshipman, then a lieutenant, and received a medal for military operations during the Crimean War in the Gulf of Finland.

In 1856 Nikolai Vereshchagin entered the Faculty of Natural Sciences at St. Petersburg University.

In Switzerland, in the town of Kopne near Geneva, he gets a job as an apprentice in a cheese factory to learn how to make cheese.

Nikolai Vasilyevich tried to set up the first cheese factory in the village of Gorodnya, but without success.

From 1866 to 1868 Vereshchagin opened more than a dozen artel cheese factories in Tverskoy and Korchevskoy Uezds.

== Family ==
Brothers:

- Vasily Vereshchagin (painter)
- Alexander (received the rank of general)
- Aleksey (revolutionary)
- Sergey Vereshchagin (died volunteering for the Russo-Turkish War of 1877-1878)
- Mikhail (was engaged in homestead farming)

His wife was Tatyana (nee Vanina, a former serf)
