= Vasily Petrovich Vereshchagin =

Russian painter (1835–1909)

- Василий Петрович Верещагин
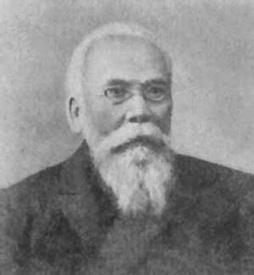
- Born: January 1, 1835; Perm
- Died: October 9, 1909 (aged 74); Saint Petersburg
- Education: Imperial Academy of Arts (1861)
- Known for: Painting
- Awards: Big Gold Medal of the Imperial Academy of Arts (1861)
- Elected: Professor by rank (1869)

Vasily Petrovich Vereshchagin (Russian: Василий Петрович Верещагин; 13 January 1835, in Perm – 22 October 1909, in Saint Petersburg) was a Russian portraitist, history painter and illustrator.

== Biography ==
His father, Pyotr Prokopovich (1795-1843) and grandfather, Prokopy Danilovich (1764-c.1811) were painters. His brothers, Pyotr and Mitrofan (1842–1894) became painters as well. His first art lessons came from his father while he was attending the public schools. He also worked with his maternal grandfather, a local icon painter named Ivan Babin.

In 1856, he enrolled at the Imperial Academy of Arts and studied with Alexey Markov. He remained there for six years and was awarded a gold medal for his painting of Sophia of Lithuania at the wedding of her son, Vasily the Blind. Later, thanks to a stipend from the Academy, he was able to study in Europe, especially Rome, where he copied the Old Masters, and won a gold medal at the International Exposition in Paris in 1867.

Upon his return to Saint Petersburg in 1869, he presented two large paintings with several portraits and watercolors and was appointed a Professor of history and portrait painting at the Academy, a position he held for twenty years. The following year, he created decorations on themes from Russian folk poetry in the palace of Grand Duke Vladimir.

In 1873, he received another gold medal at the Vienna Exposition, and did further decorative work at the Cathedral of Christ the Saviour (1875-1879) and in the Assumption Cathedral of the Kiev Pechersk Lavra. In 1891, he published an album, featuring portraits of notable people and scenes from history, which became very popular. After his health began to fail, he presented many of his paintings, and some by his late brother Pyotr, to the "Scientific Industrial Museum" in Perm, towards the goal of creating a separate art department there.

== Selected paintings ==
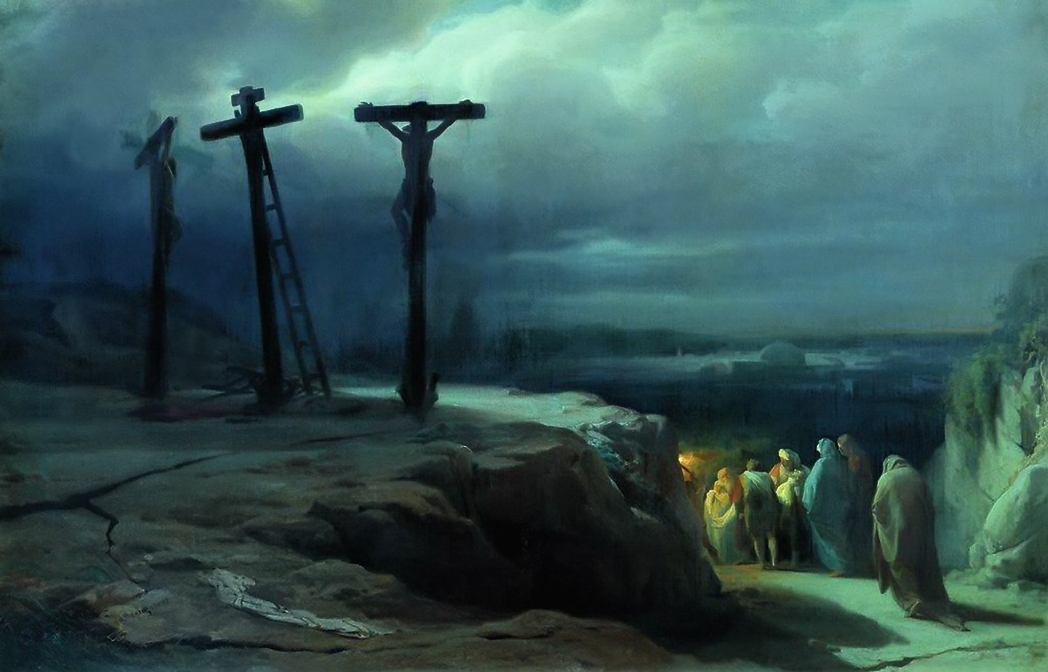
Night on Golgotha

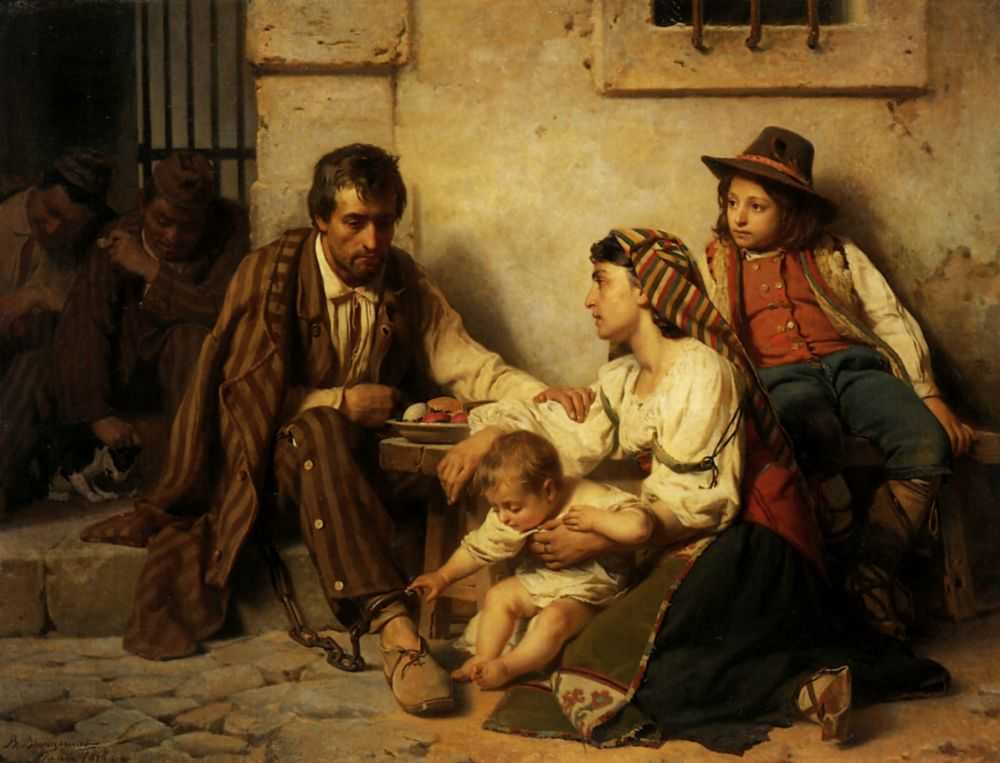
A Prison Visit

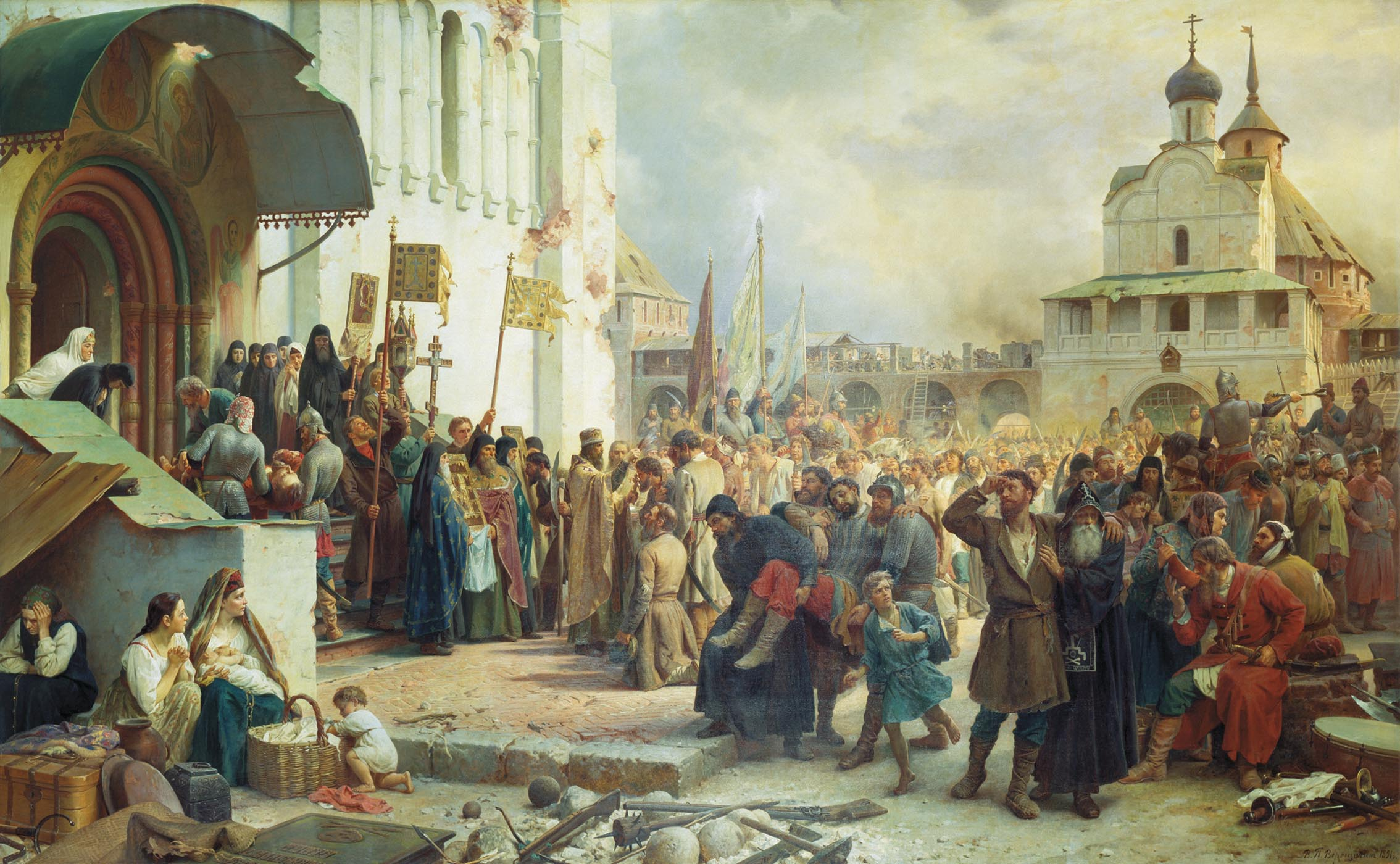
Defenders of the Holy Trinity (Trinity Lavra of St. Sergius) in 1608

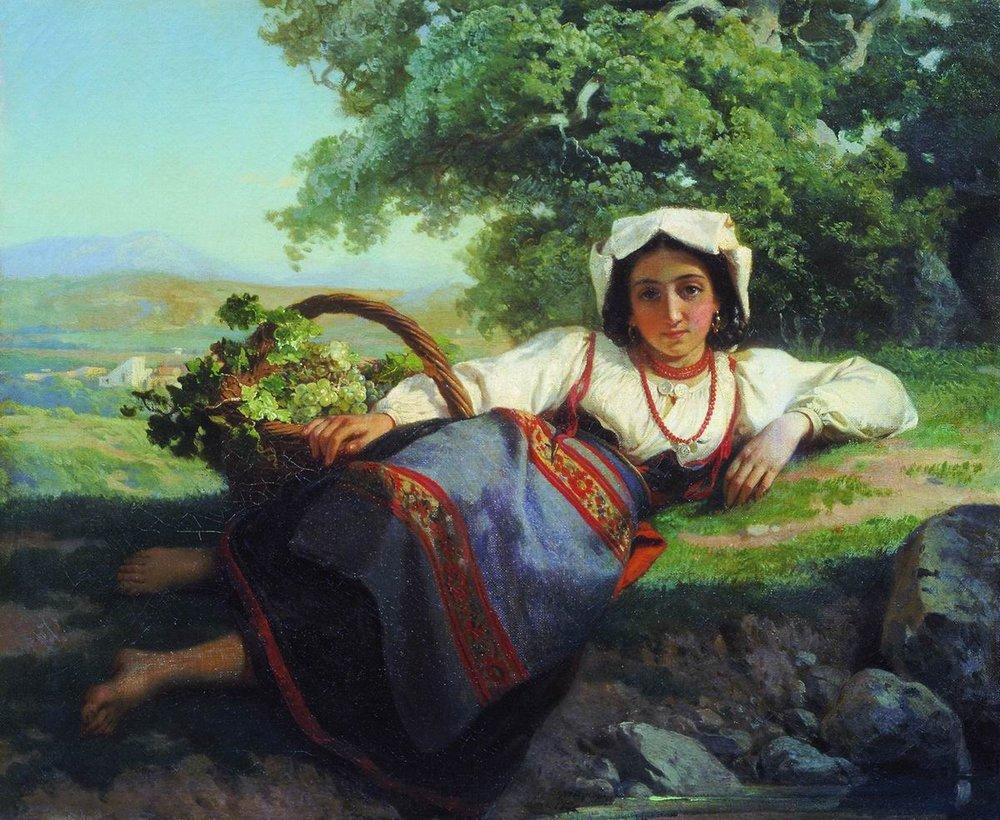
Girl with Grapes

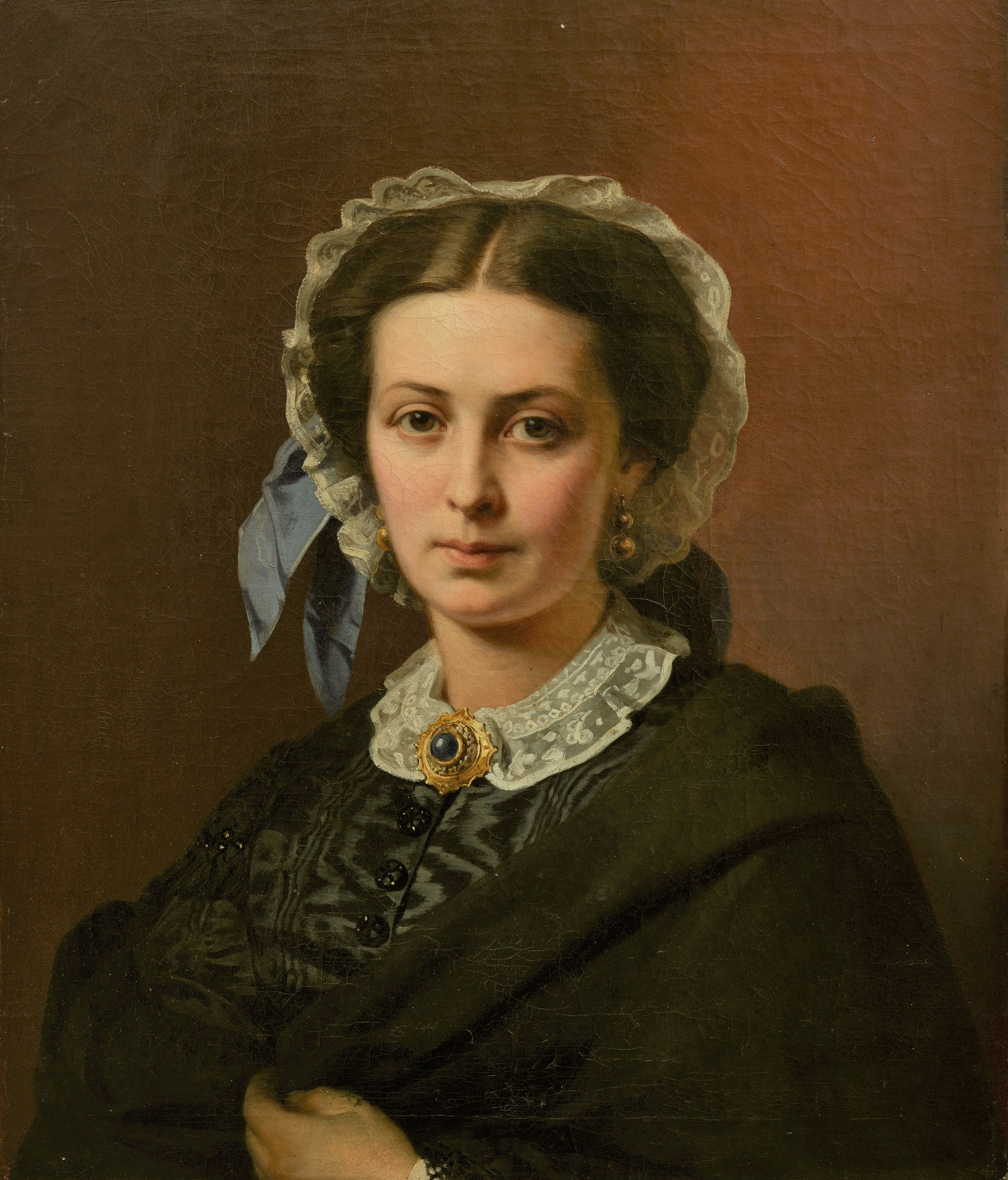
Portrait of Nadezhda Pavlovna Bogolyubova, Alexey Bogolyubov's wife

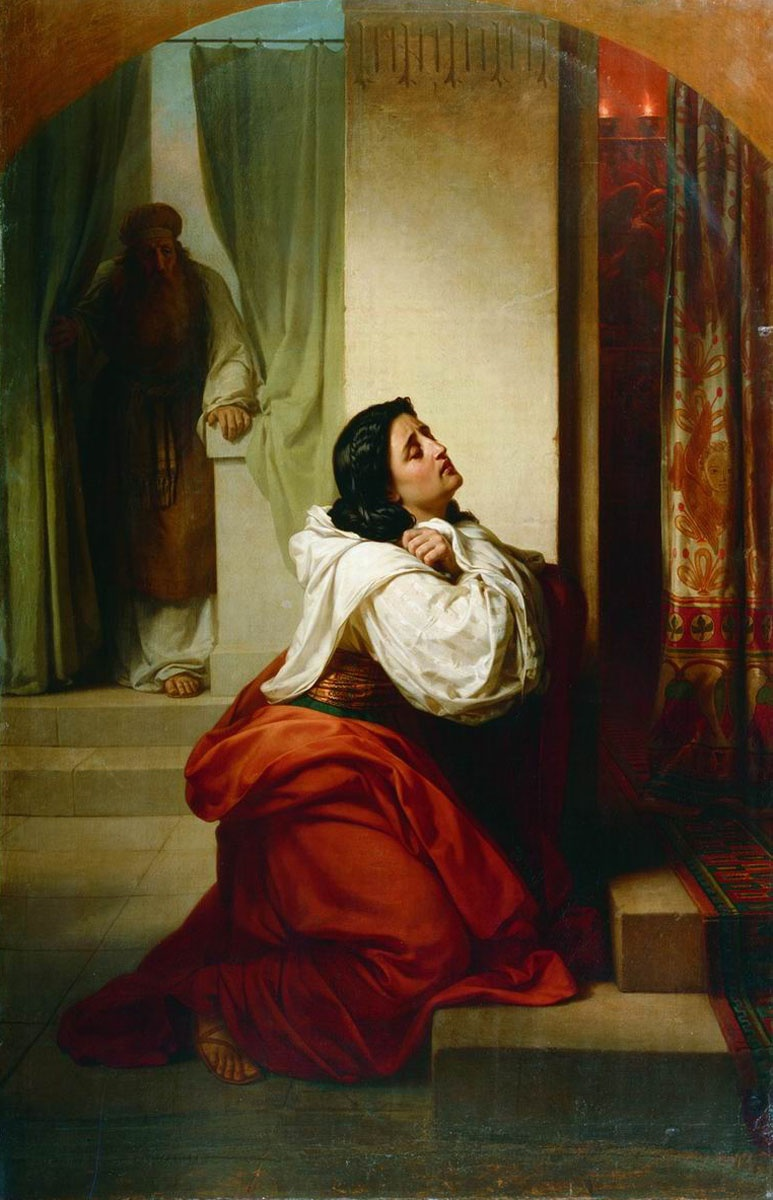
The prayer of Hannah, mother of Samuel

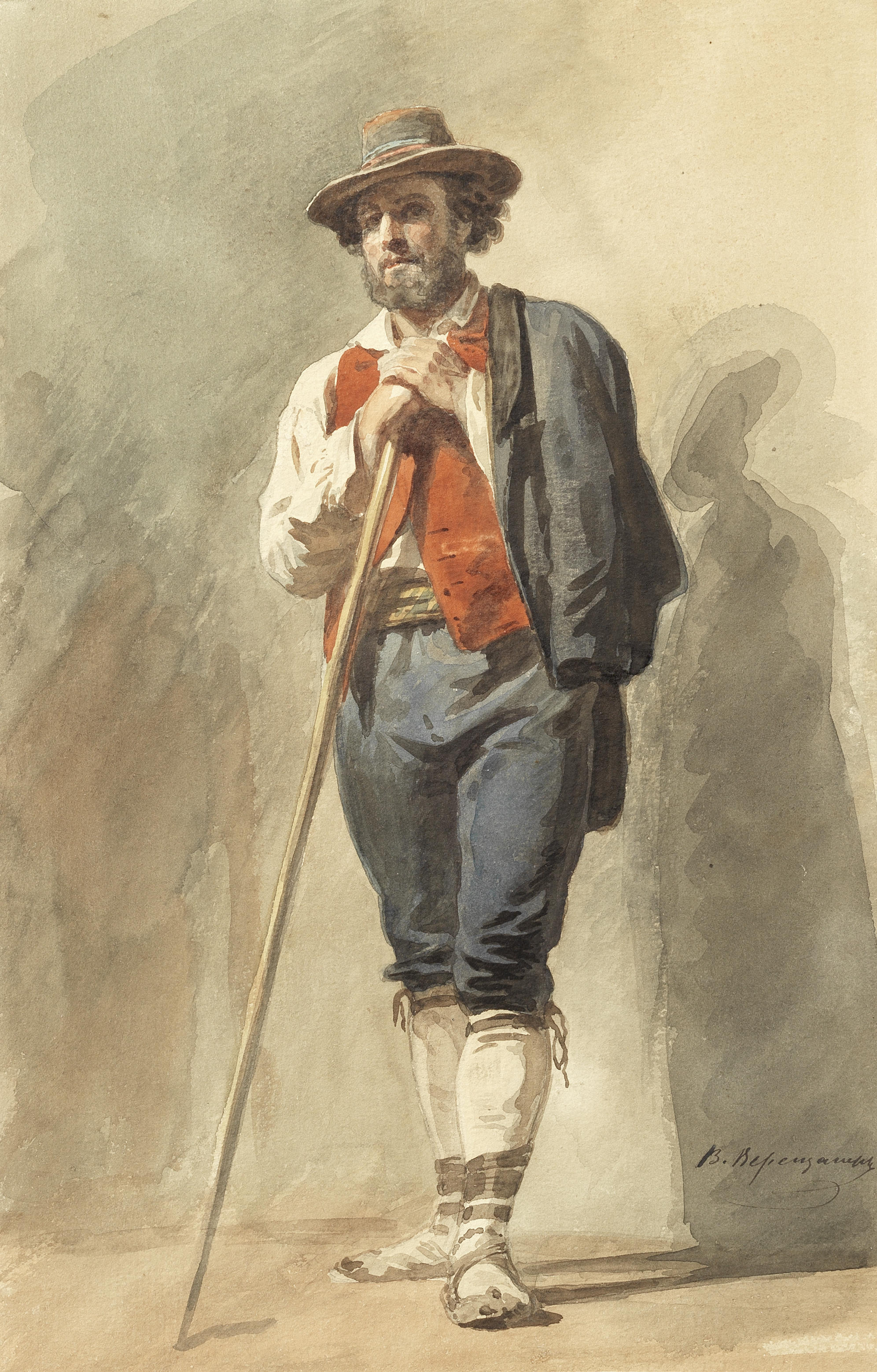
An Italian in native dress

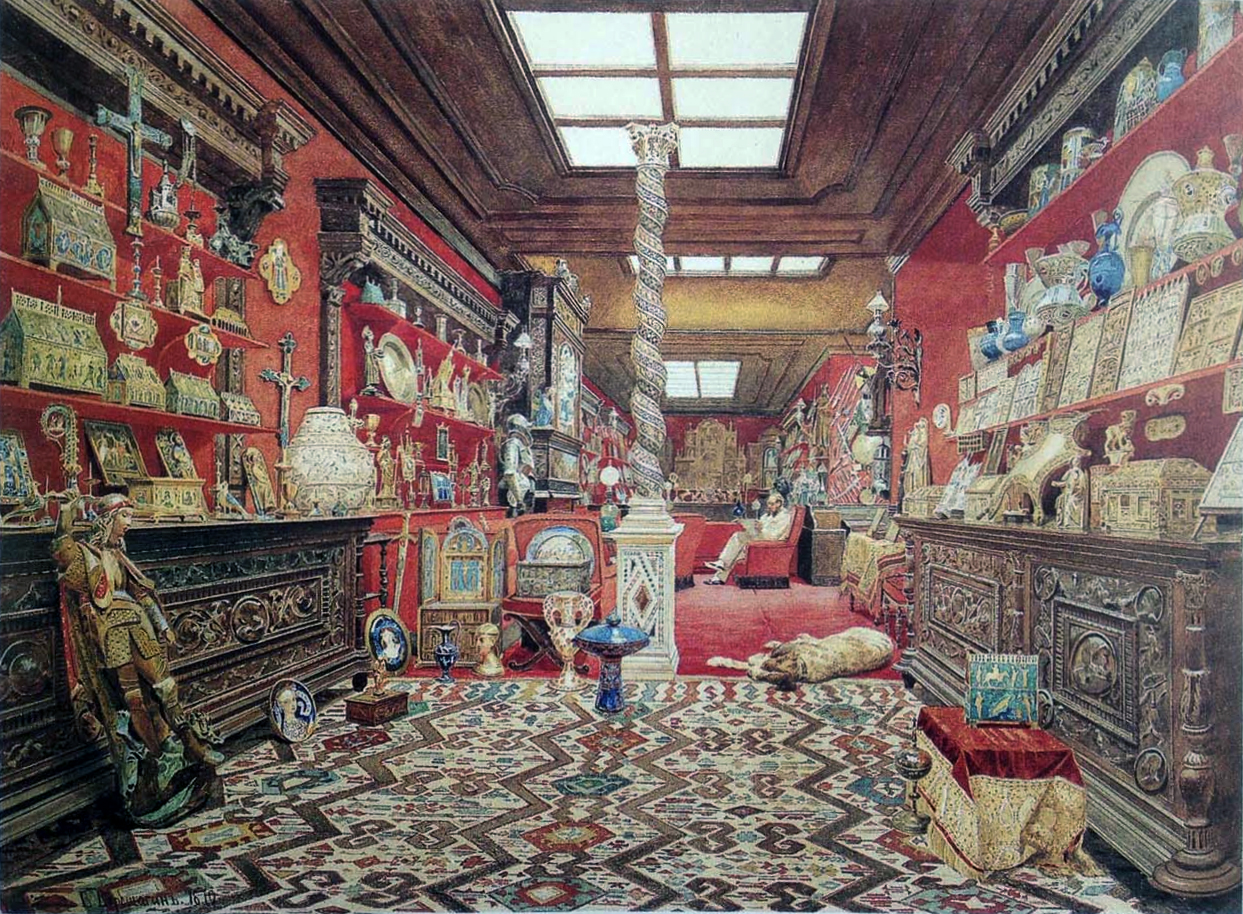
Alexander Bazilevsky's collection in Paris

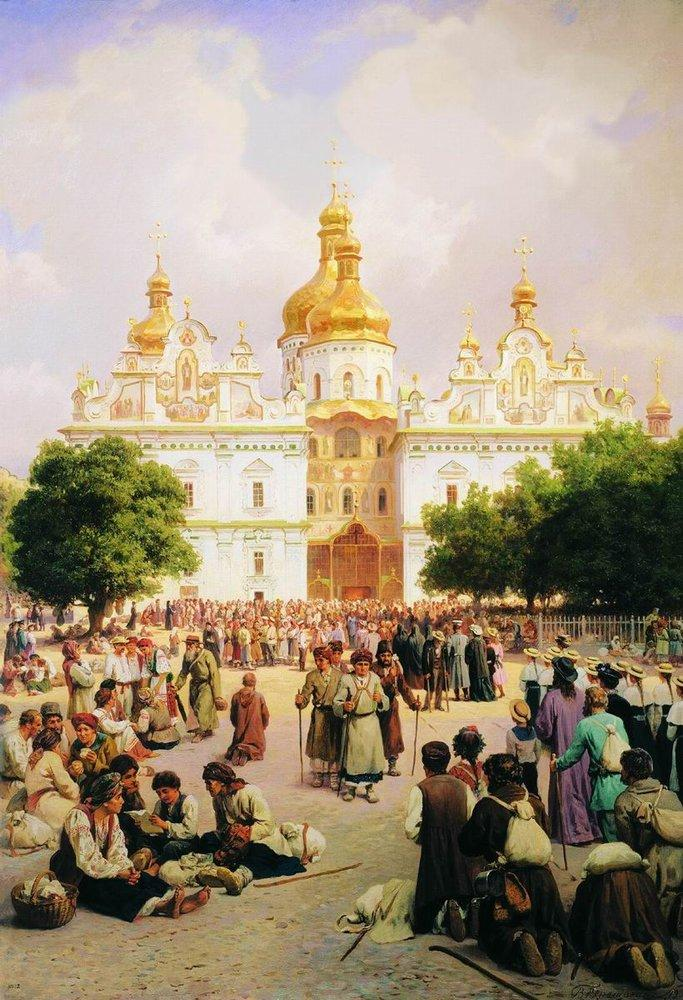
Kiev-Pechersk Lavra
