= Vereshchagino, Puchezhsky District, Ivanovo Oblast =

Vereshchagino Верещагино
- Village
- Location within Ivanovo Oblast Location within Russia
- Coordinates: 56°58′N 42°55′E
- Country: Russia
- Region: Ivanovo Oblast
- District: Puchezhsky District
- Time zone: UTC+3:00

Vereshchagino (Russian: Верещагино) is a rural locality (a village) in Puchezhsky District, Ivanovo Oblast, Russia. Population: 36 (2010 census);

== Geography ==
This rural locality is located 15 kilometres (9.3 mi) from Puchezh (the district's administrative centre), 118 kilometres (73 mi) from Ivanovo (capital of Ivanovo Oblast) and 349 kilometres (217 mi) from Moscow. Neupokoikha is the nearest rural locality.
