= Vereshchagino, Vladimir Oblast =

Vereshchagino Верещагино
- Village
- Location within Vladimir Oblast Location within Russia
- Coordinates: 56°22′N 41°05′E
- Country: Russia
- Region: Vladimir Oblast
- District: Kameshkovsky District
- Time zone: UTC+3:00

Vereshchagino (Russian: Верещагино) is a rural locality (a village) in Bryzgalovskoye Rural Settlement, Kameshkovsky District, Vladimir Oblast, Russia. The population was 144 as of 2010.

== Geography ==
Vereshchagino is located 7 km northeast of Kameshkovo (the district's administrative centre) by road. Novki is the nearest rural locality.
