= Vasily Mate =

Russian artist (1856–1917)

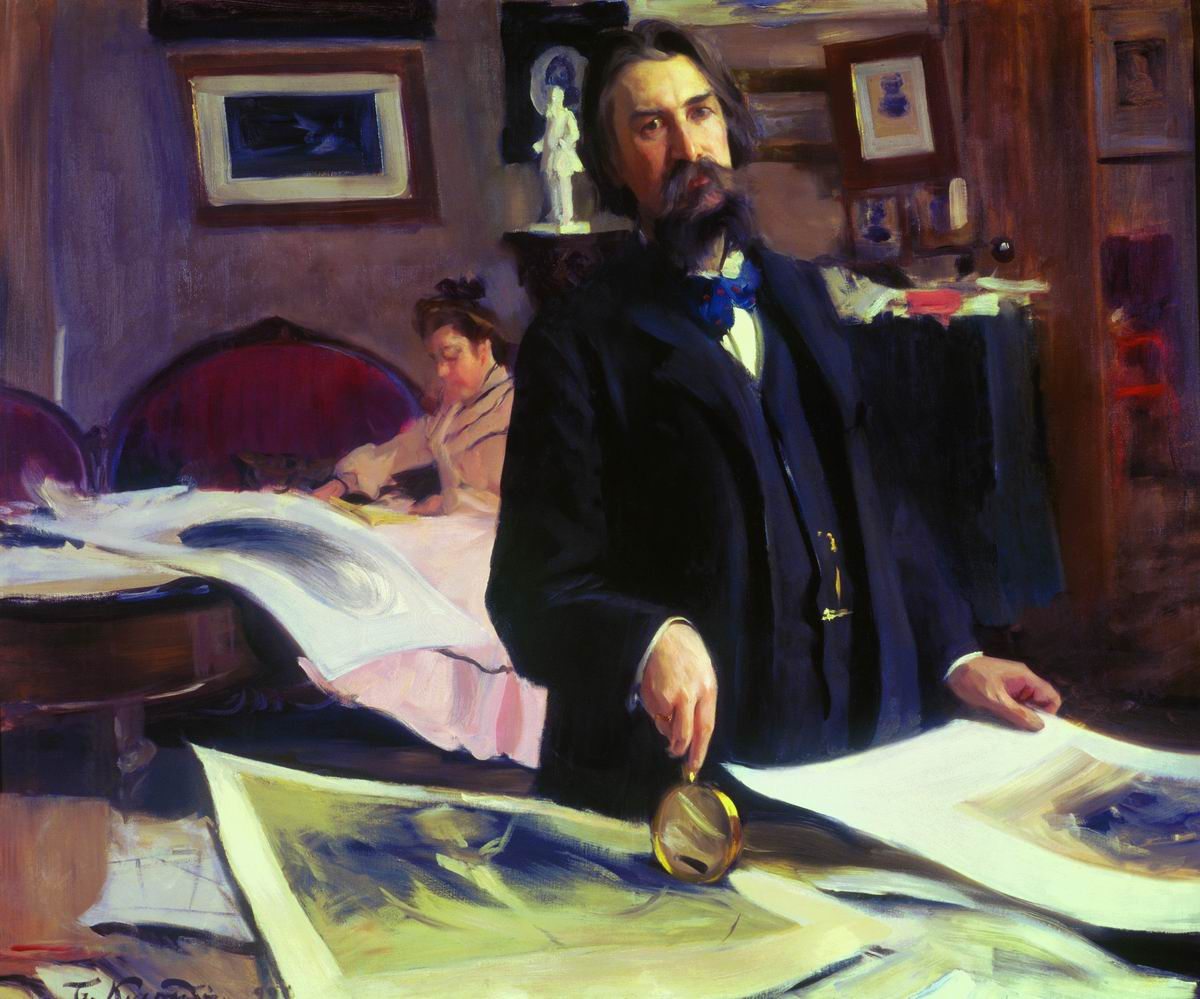
- Portrait by Boris Kustodiev, 1902
- Born: Wilhelm Johann Mathé; 23 February 1856; Verzhbolovo, Augustów Governorate, Russian Empire
- Died: 9 April 1917 (aged 61); Petrograd, Russian Republic
- Resting place: Smolensky Lutheran Cemetery, Saint Petersburg
- Education: Lavrentiy Seryakov; Fyodor Iordan
- Alma mater: Imperial Academy of Arts
- Known for: Etching and wood engraving

Vasily Vasilyevich Mate or Mathé (Russian: Василий Васильевич Матэ; 6 March [O.S. 23 February] 1856 – 22 April [O.S. 9 April] 1917) was a Russian etcher and wood engraver of German descent, active in St. Petersburg (later Petrograd) during Tsars Alexander III and Nicholas II's reigns In contrast to other Russian artisans of the era which prioritized poetry, he was a skilled engraver and was one of the major engravers in Russia during the late 19th century. He collaborated with major Russian painters and produced engravings of their paintings, thus helping popularize Russian art.

== Selected gallery ==
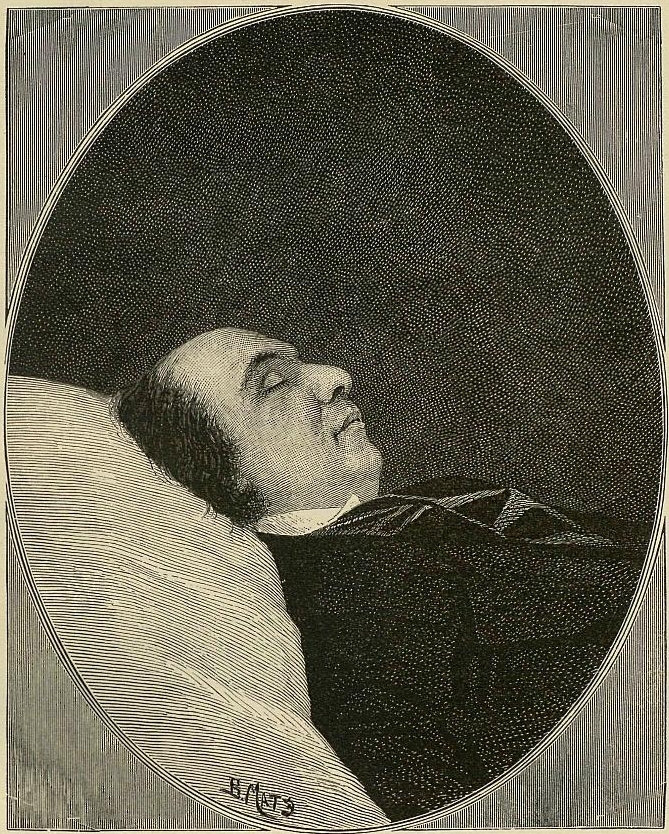
Timofey Granovsky

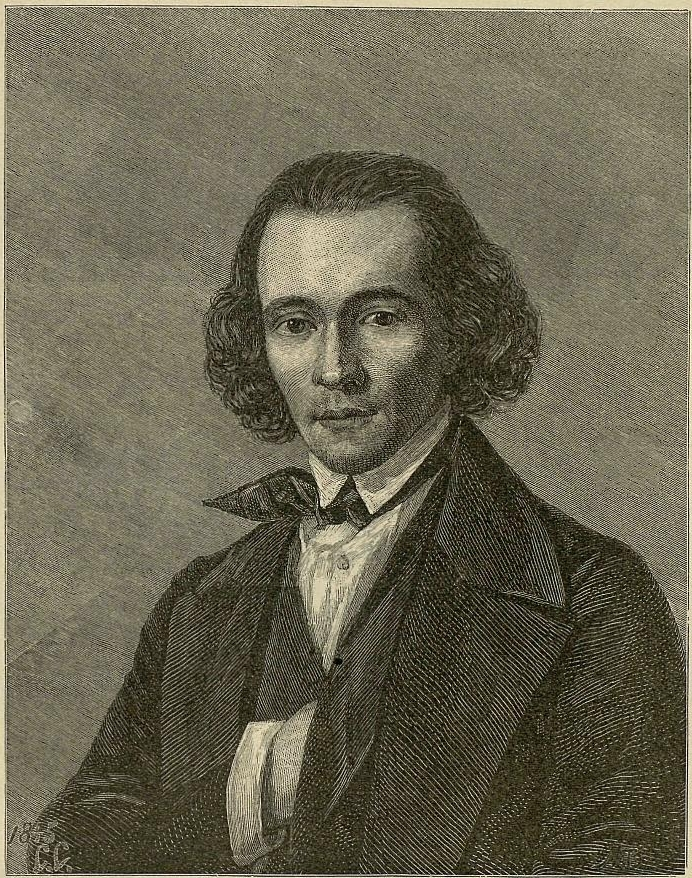
Alexander Serov

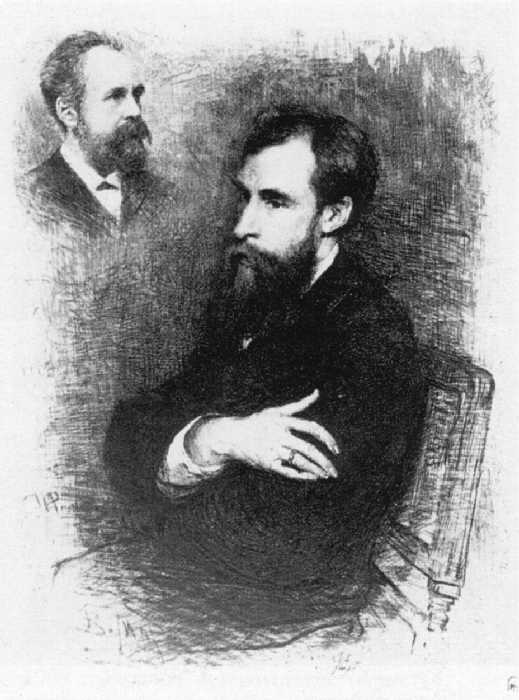
Pavel Tretyakov

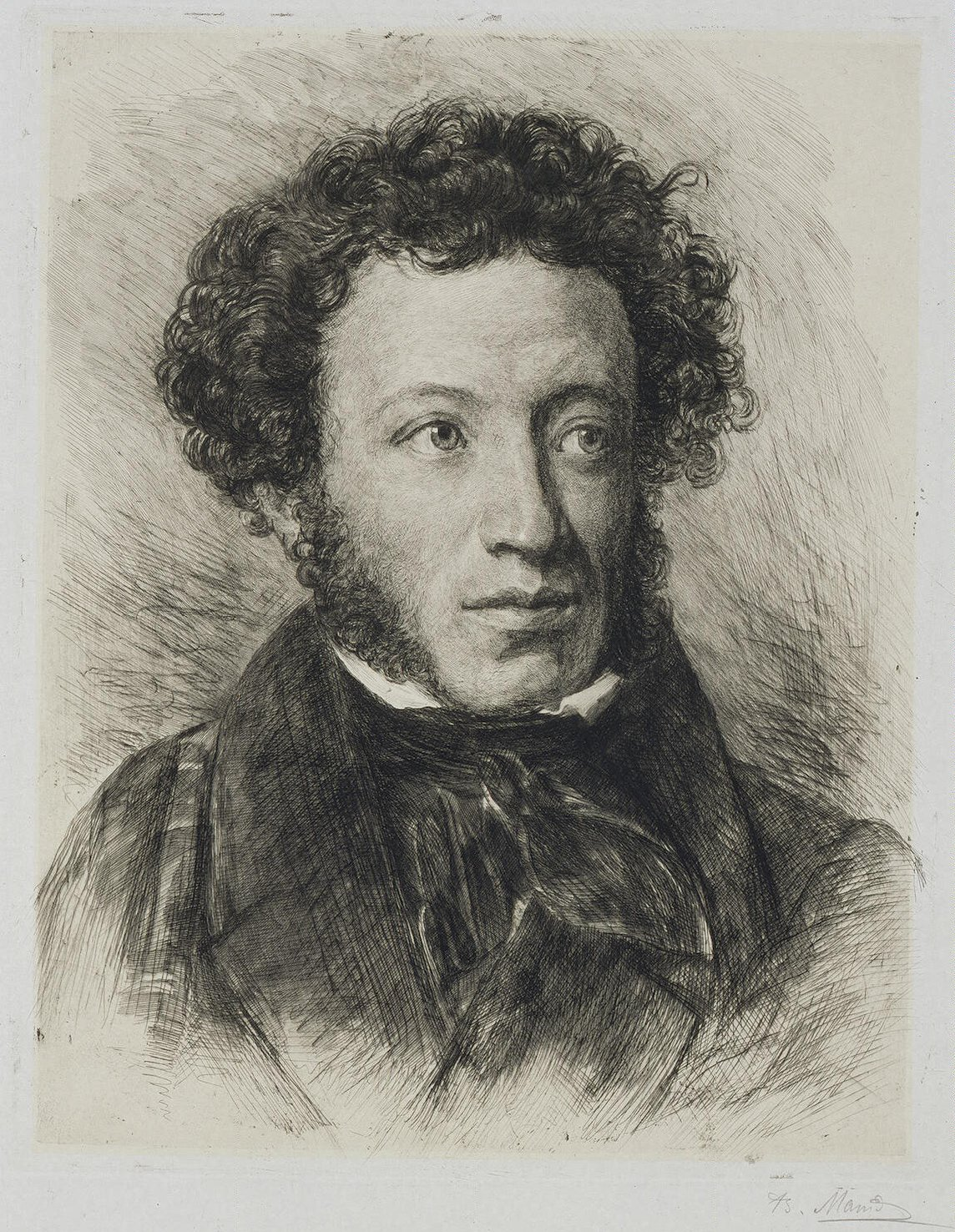
Alexander Pushkin

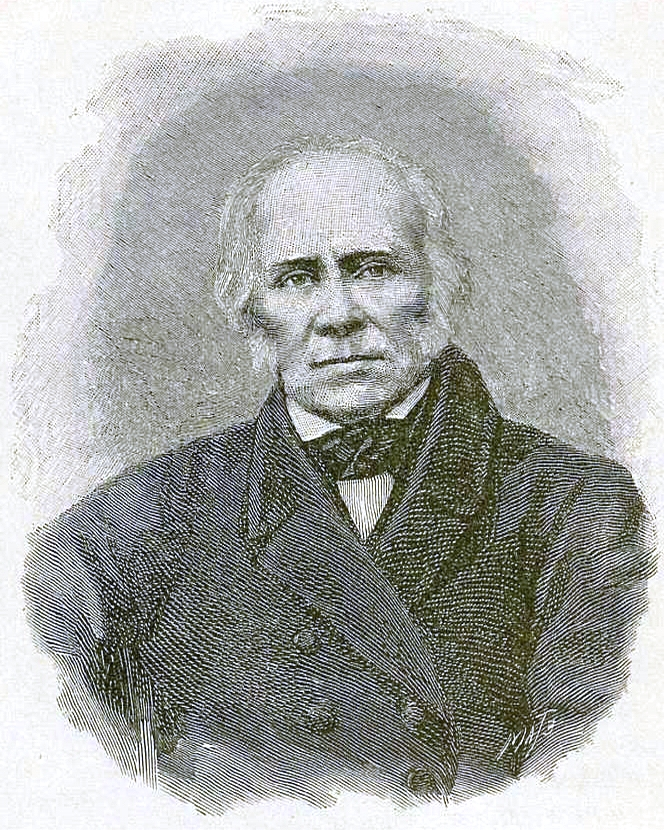
Vasily Karazin

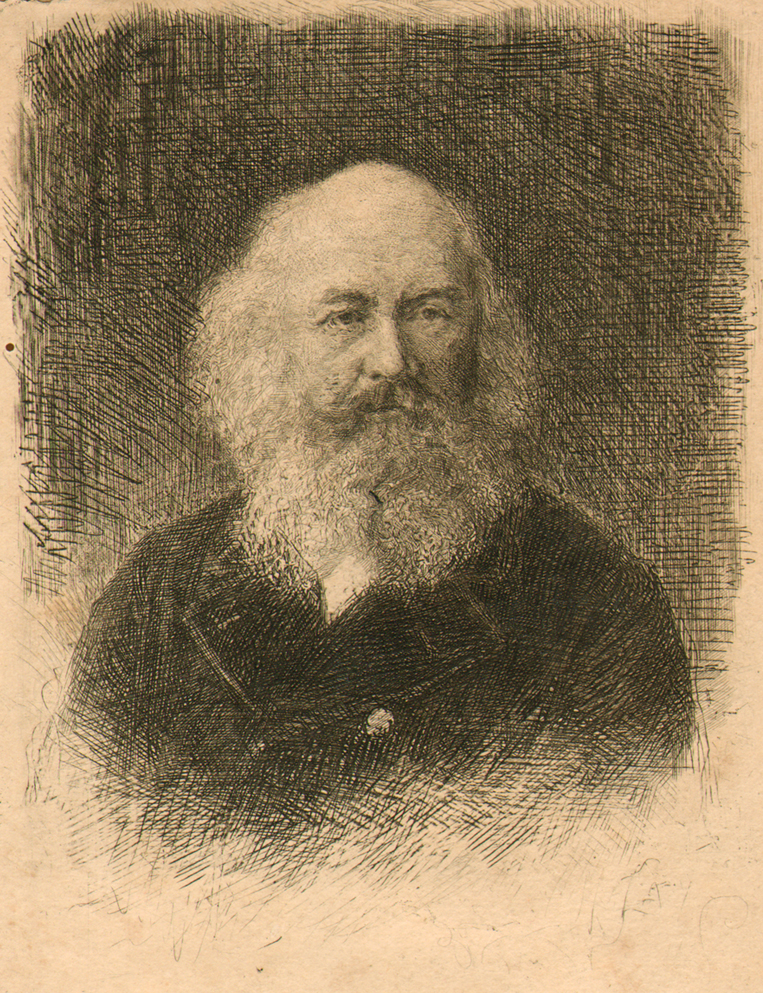
Dmitry Rovinsky

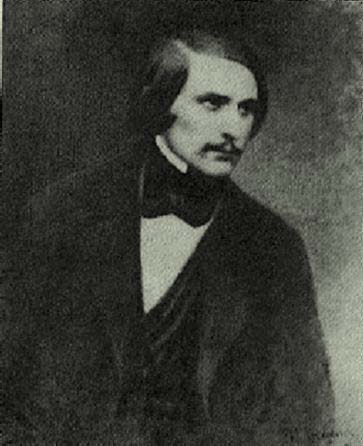
Nikolai Gogol
