= Portrait of Chaliapin =

1921 painting by Boris Kustodiev

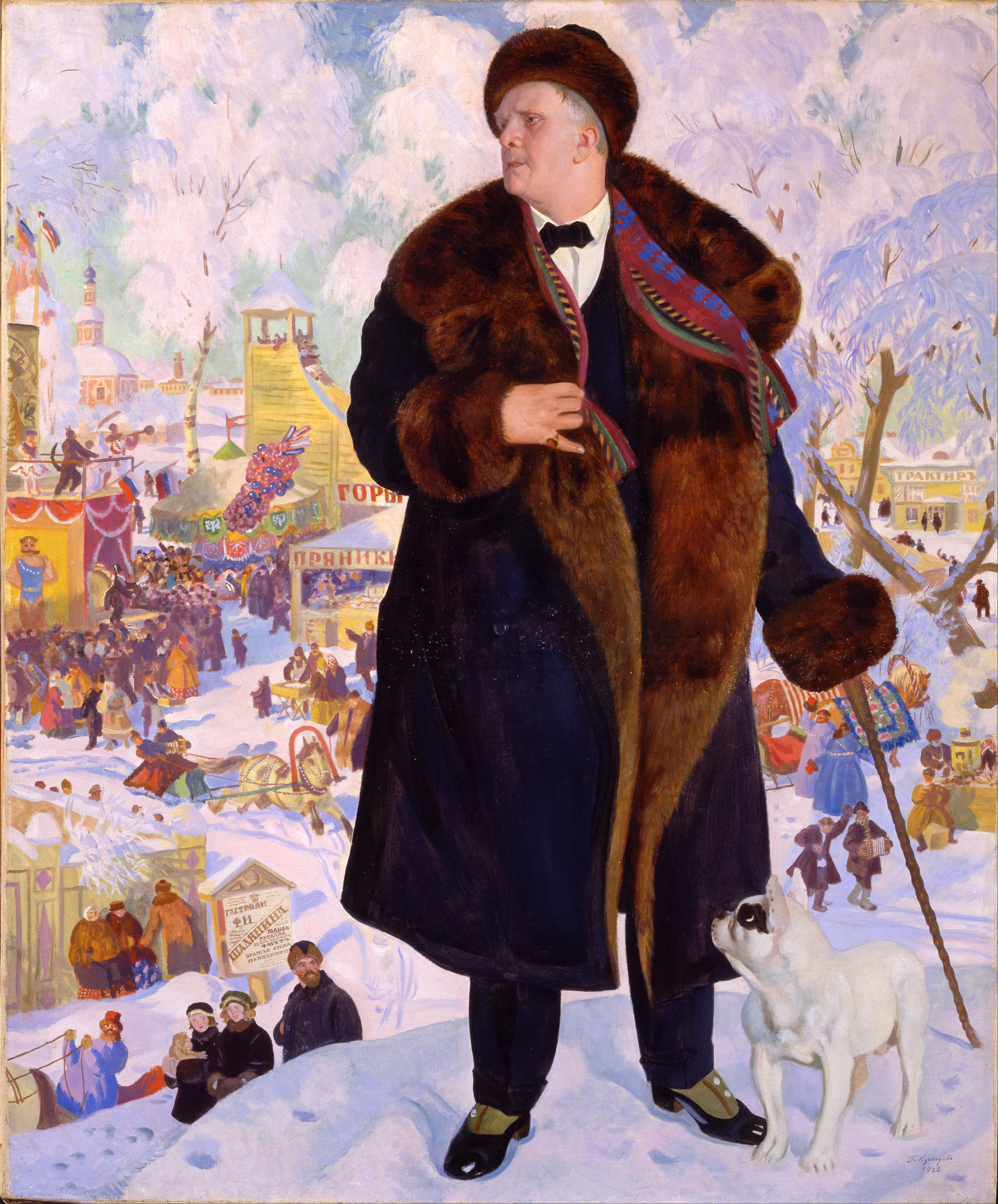
The reduced version in the Russian Museum, St. Petersburg.

The Portrait of Chaliapin is a painting by Boris Kustodiev, created in 1921 in Petrograd (modern day Saint Petersburg). At this time the opera singer Feodor Chaliapin was preparing to perform in Alexander Serov's opera The Power of the Fiend in the former Mariinsky Theatre. He invited Boris Kustodiev to create artwork for the performance.

The upheaval caused by the February and October Revolutions and the Russian Civil War led to desperate conditions in the cities. The currency was devalued and there was no money for the theatre to pay Chaliapin for his performance. Instead the theatre offered Chaliapin a rich fur coat, taken from a Soviet warehouse containing items confiscated from rich people during the revolution. Chaliapin wore the coat on a visit to Kustodiev to invite him to design artworks for the performance. Kustodiev was ill at the time and was unable to walk. When Kustodiev learned of the coat's history, confiscated from its previous owner, he announced his intention to paint a portrait of Chaliapin in this coat. Thus began a double work: Feodor Chaliapin brought Kustodiev to the theatre to work on the stage scenery, and Kustodiev painted Chaliapin's portrait at home. The Soviet government had allocated only a small room to Kustodiev, and there was not enough space to work on a single canvas. Instead Kustodiev painted it in parts. Chaliapin talked about himself as he posed, and at times they sang together.

The Portrait of Chaliapin is typical of Kustodiev's style, and is set against a background of festivity, specifically the Russian traditions of Maslenitsa. Kustodiev titled the picture New City, depicting a city where Chaliapin had arrived for the first time while on tour. But the name did not stick, and the picture became known as the Portrait of Chaliapin. The picture is full of symbolism. Chaliapin rises over the people, from which he had emerged. He is dressed in a smart suit, holding a cane, as was fashionable at the time. Kustodiev included in the scene Chaliapin's favourite dog. In the lower left corner of the portrait Kustodiev painted Chaliapin's daughters Mary and Martha, strolling on the festive square, accompanied by a close friend, the secretary of singer I. Dvorictchin. They are shown near a theatre poster promoting Chaliapin's concert.

In 1922 Chaliapin emigrated from Russia, taking the portrait with him. That same year Kustodiev made a miniature copy of the portrait, which is now displayed in the Russian Museum, Saint Petersburg. The original is now in the Saint Petersburg State Museum of Theatre and Music.
