= The Beauty =

Painting by Boris Kustodiev

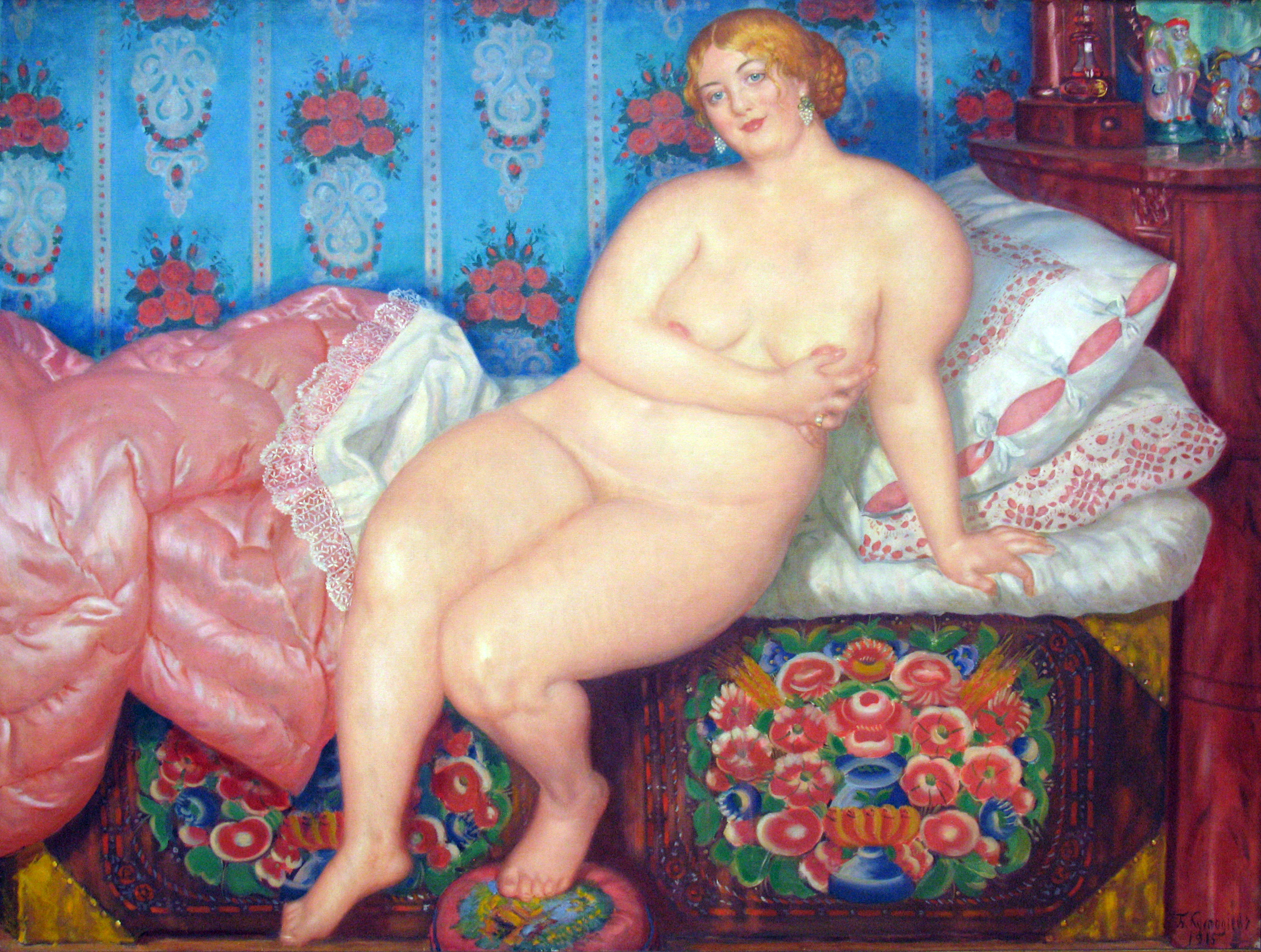
- Artist: Boris Kustodiev
- Year: 1915
- Medium: Oil on canvas
- Dimensions: 141 cm × 185 cm (56 in × 73 in)
- Location: Tretyakov Gallery; Moscow

The Beauty (Russian: Красавица, romanized: Krasavitsa) is an oil-on-canvas painting executed in 1915 by the Russian artist Boris Kustodiev.

== Description ==
The painting measures 141 by 185 centimeters and is housed at the Tretyakov Gallery.

The Moscow Art Theatre actress Faina Shevchenko was the model for the painting.

The painting features a nude, large woman sitting on a bed in a colorfully decorated room with flowery wallpaper. With her right hand the woman is holding her breasts. Her pubic area is only partly hidden by her legs.

== History ==
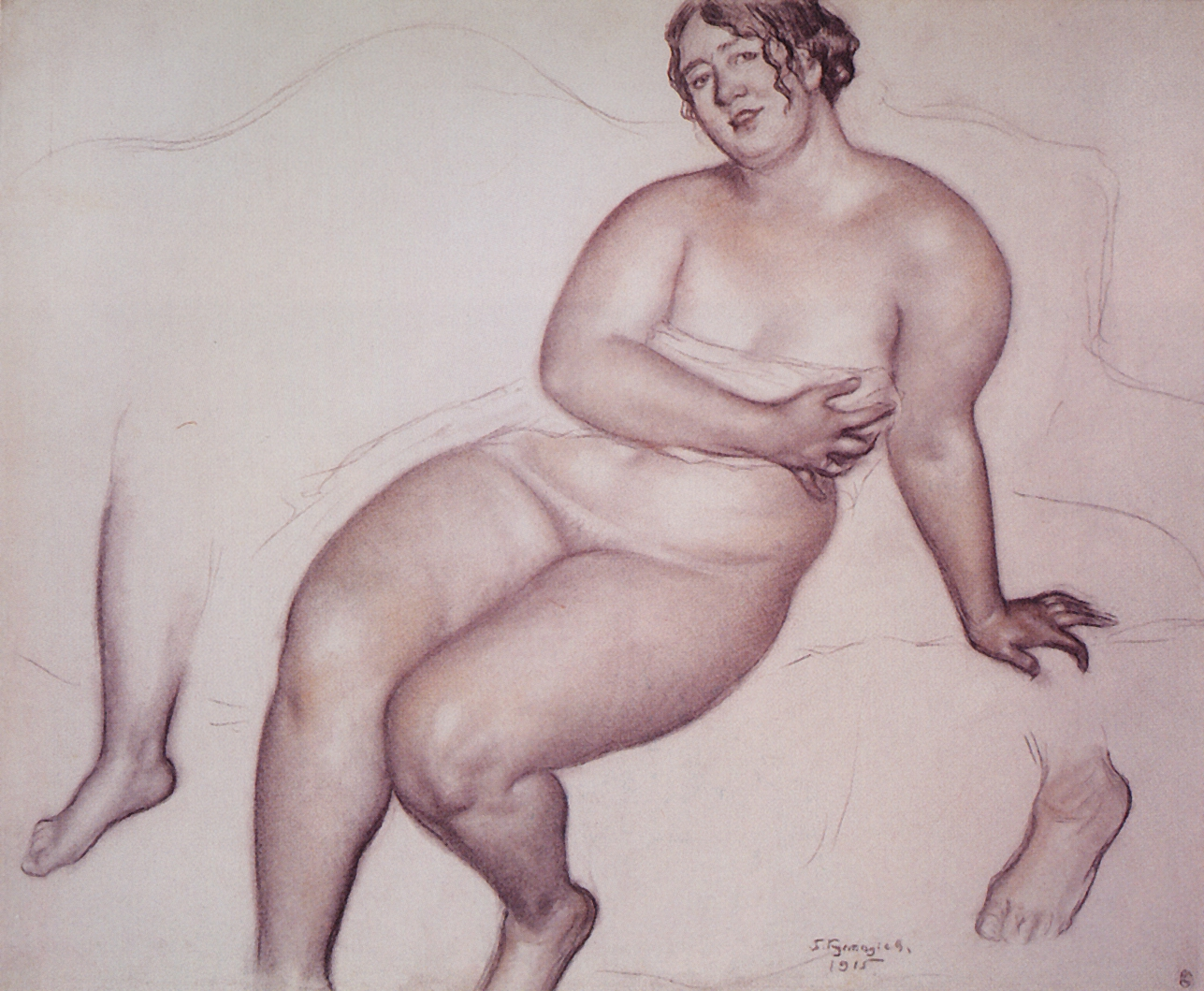
Sanguine sketch

Faina Shevchenko, age 21, an actress of the Moscow Art Theatre, was the model for the painting. Kustodiev generally preferred stout women for his paintings, and once remarked that "skinny women do not inspire." Therefore he viewed The Beauty as a chef-d'œuvre of his style and absolute pinnacle of his career, later creating three paintings stylistically similar to The Beauty with minor alterations in set and pose. The painting conveys a hyperbolical archetype of a mother goddess according to Kustodiev's personal ideal. He first noticed Shevchenko at a play in the theatre, for which he served as a set decorator. It took Kustodiev time and effort to talk Shevchenko into the creation, which initially she refused: "Oh! I, the actress, be sitting in the nude! Thousands of people will see, what a disgrace!" After a while she agreed only "for the sake of the art." Initial sketches show the woman holding a strip of fabric covering tips of her breasts and specifically the nipples. After rumours of Shevchenko posing for the painting in the nude reached her chief, Konstantin Stanislavski, he called her a "harlot", though later Stanislavski pardoned Shevchenko and gave her major roles in plays staged at the theatre. Shevchenko herself, after viewing the painting at its premiere, reportedly said "Very fat!" Kustodiev replied "As is" and kissed her hand. The Russian Orthodox Church Metropolitan, who visited the premiere, said that "the Devil steered the painter's reckless hand while he was creating". Upon viewing The Beauty at its Berlin premiere at the Unter Den Linden gallery, George Loukomski, an art critic, labelled the painting "The Yaroslavlian Danaë". Reproductions of the painting by the artist, he presented to Maxim Gorky and Feodor Chaliapin. The original was kept by the family of the artist and eventually confiscated by the communist authorities during the Stalin's purges in 1937–38, and since then has been stored at the Tretyakov Gallery in Moscow.
