= Boris Kustodiev =

Russian painter and stage designer (1878–1927)

- Борис Кустодиев
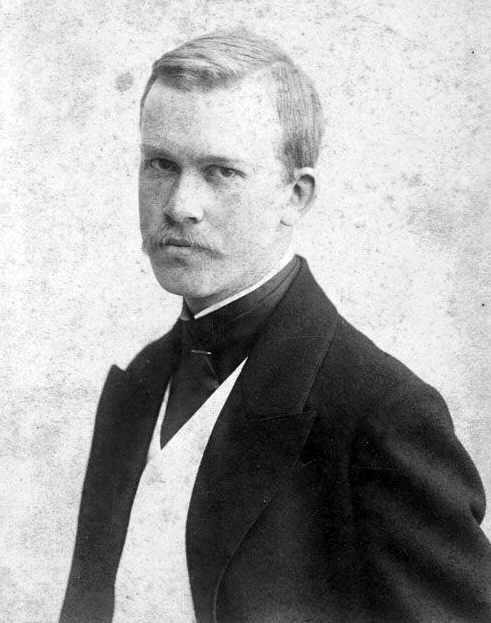
- Kustodiev in c. 1900
- Born: 7 March 1878; Astrakhan, Russian Empire
- Died: 28 May 1927 (aged 49); Leningrad, Soviet Union
- Resting place: Tikhvin Cemetery, St. Petersburg
- Education: Ilya Repin
- Known for: Painting and stage design
- Spouse: Yulia Proshinskaya (m. 1903)
- Children: 3

Boris Mikhaylovich Kustodiev (Russian: Борис Михайлович Кустодиев; 7 March [O.S. 23 February] 1878 – 28 May 1927) was a Russian painter, draughtsman, and stage designer during the Modernist period.

== Early life ==
Boris Kustodiev was born in Astrakhan into the family of a professor of philosophy, history of literature, and logic at the local theological seminary. His father died young, and all financial and material burdens fell on his mother's shoulders. The Kustodiev family rented a small wing in a rich merchant's house. It was there that the boy's first impressions were formed of the way of life of the provincial merchant class. The artist later wrote, "The whole tenor of the rich and plentiful merchant way of life was there right under my nose... It was like something out of an Ostrovsky play." The artist retained these childhood observations for years, recreating them later in oils and water-colours.

== Art studies ==
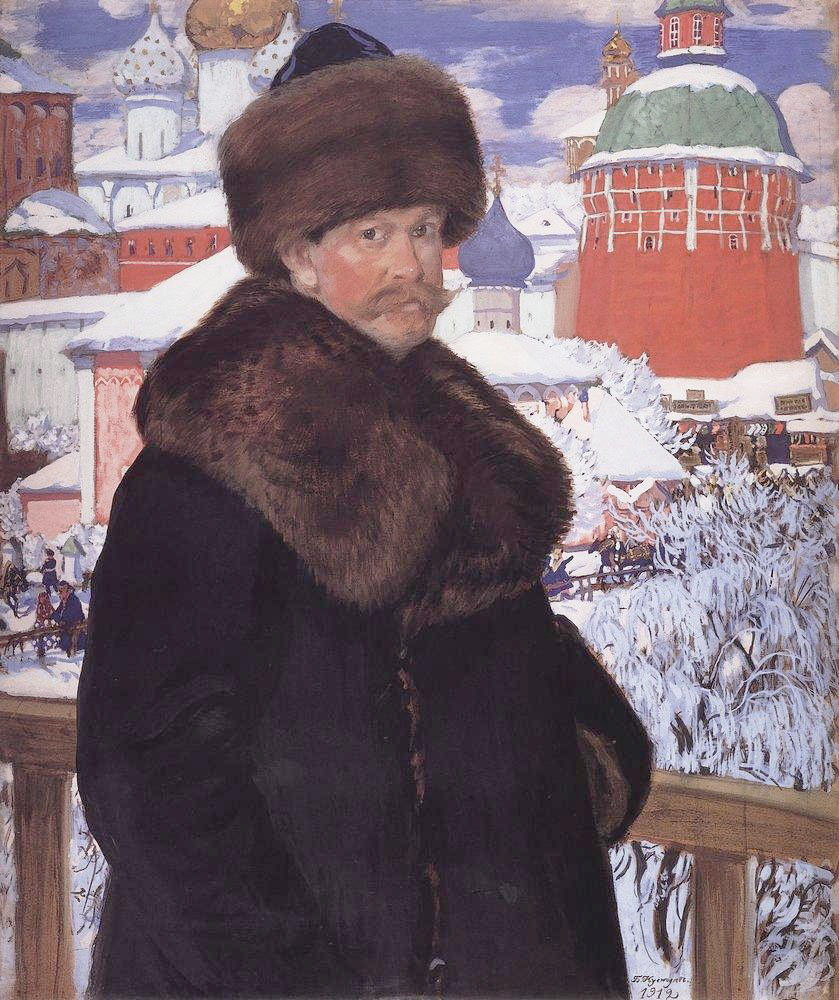
Self-portrait in front of Troitse-Sergiyeva Lavra, 1912

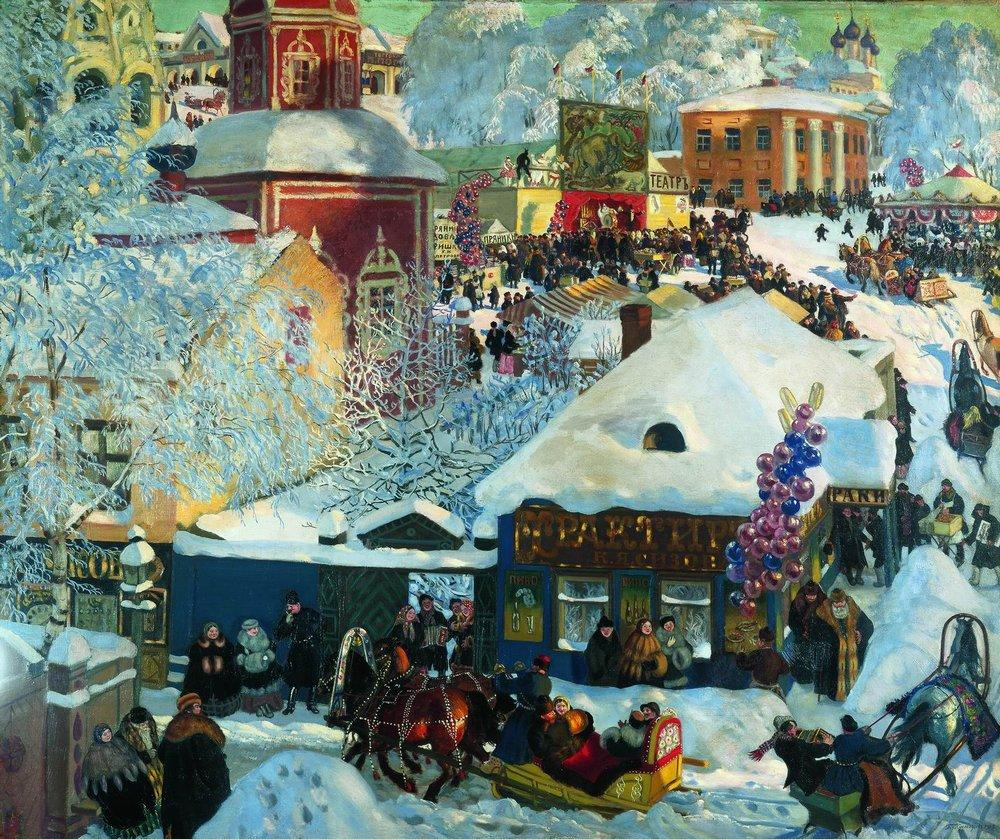
Winter-festivities 1919

Between 1893 and 1896, Kustodiev studied in theological seminary and took private art lessons in Astrakhan from Pavel Vlasov, a pupil of Vasily Perov. Subsequently, from 1896 to 1903, he attended Ilya Repin's studio at the Imperial Academy of Arts in St. Petersburg. Concurrently, he took classes in sculpture under Dmitry Stelletsky and in etching under Vasiliy Mate. He first exhibited in 1896.

"I have great hopes for Kustodiev," wrote Repin. "He is a talented artist and a thoughtful and serious man with a deep love of art; he is making a careful study of nature..." When Repin was commissioned to paint a large-scale canvas to commemorate the 100th anniversary of the State Council, he invited Kustodiev to be his assistant. The painting was extremely complex and involved a great deal of hard work. Together with his teacher, the young artist made portrait studies for the painting, and then executed the right-hand side of the final work. Also at this time, Kustodiev made a series of portraits of contemporaries whom he felt to be his spiritual comrades. These included the artist Ivan Bilibin (1901, Russian Museum), writer Daniil Mordovtsev (1901, Krasnodar Regional Art Museum), and the engraver Mate (1902, Russian Museum). Working on these portraits considerably helped the artist, forcing him to make a close study of his model and to penetrate the complex world of the human soul.

In 1903, he married Yuliya Proshinskaya (1880–1942).

He visited France and Spain on a grant from the Imperial Academy of Arts in 1904. Also in 1904, he attended the private studio of René Ménard in Paris. After that he traveled to Spain, then, in 1907, to Italy, and in 1909 he visited Austria and Germany, and again France and Italy. During these years he painted many portraits and genre pieces. However, no matter where Kustodiev happened to be – in sunny Seville or in the park at Versailles – he felt the irresistible pull of his motherland. After five months in France he returned to Russia, writing with evident joy to his friend Mate that he was back once more "in our blessed Russian land".

== Career ==
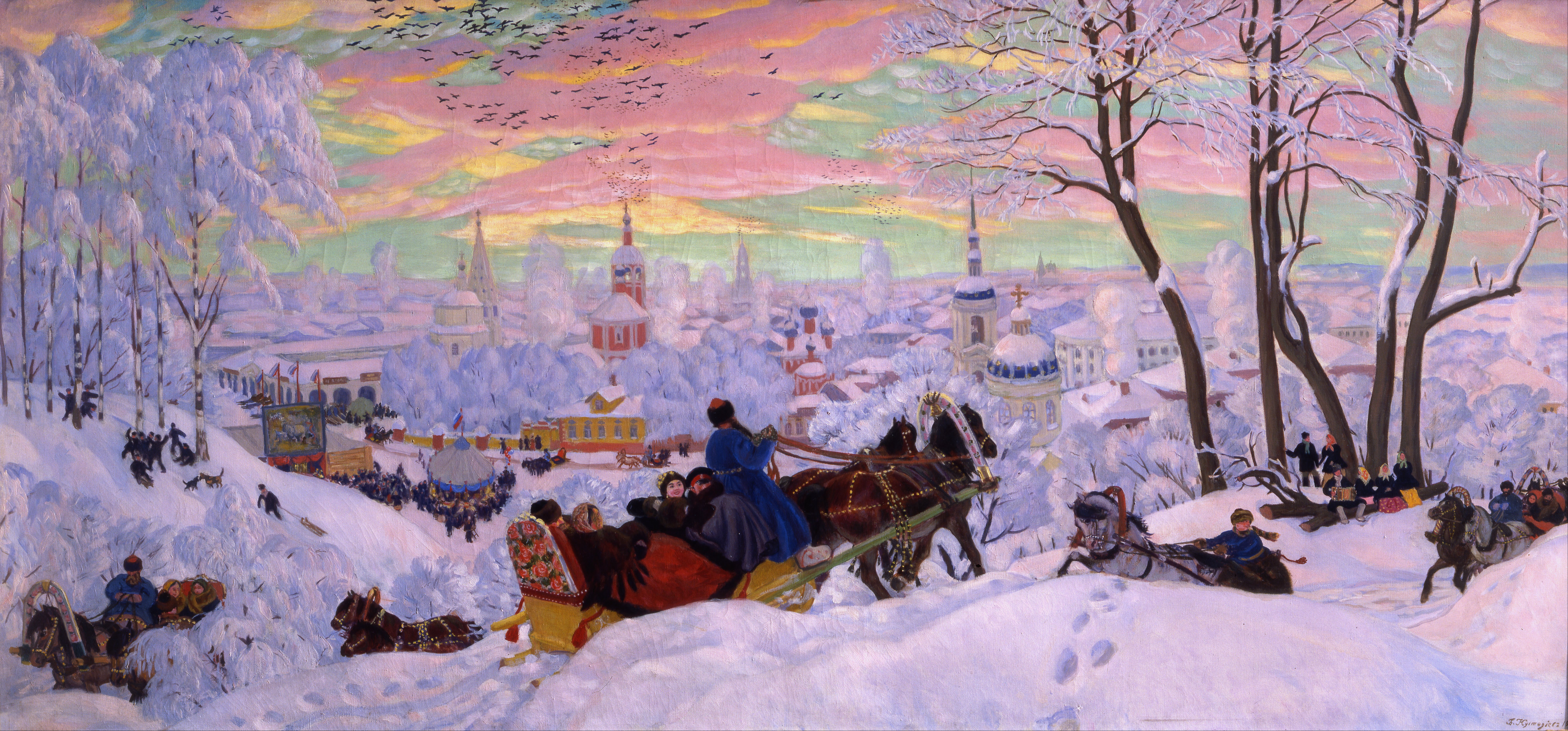
Shrovetide (1916)

The Russian Revolution of 1905, which shook the foundations of society, evoked a vivid response in the artist's soul. He contributed to the satirical journals Vampir (Vampire), Zhupel (Bugbear) and Adskaya Pochta (Hell's Mail). At that time, he first met the artists of Mir Iskusstva (World of Art), the group of innovative Russian artists. He joined their association in 1910 and subsequently took part in all their exhibitions.

In 1905, Kustodiev first turned to book illustrating, a genre in which he worked throughout his entire life. He illustrated many works of classical Russian literature, including Nikolai Gogol's Dead Souls, The Carriage, and The Overcoat; Mikhail Lermontov's The Lay of Tsar Ivan Vasilyevich, His Young Oprichnik and the Stouthearted Merchant Kalashnikov; and Leo Tolstoy's How the Devil Stole the Peasants Hunk of Bread and The Candle.

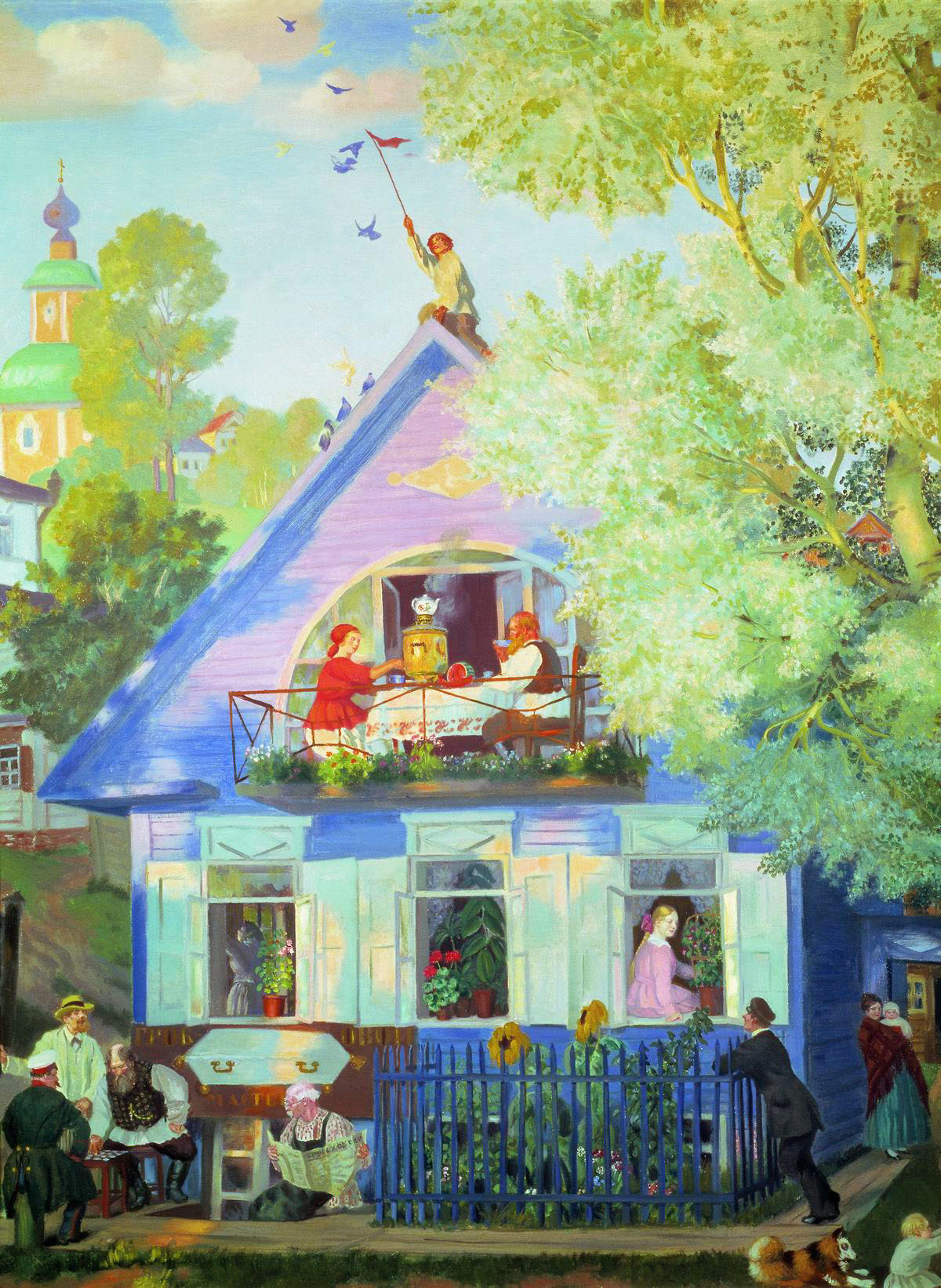
Blue House (1920).

In 1909, he was elected into Imperial Academy of Arts. He continued to work intensively, but a grave illness—tuberculosis of the spine—required urgent attention. On the advice of his doctors he went to Switzerland, where he spent a year undergoing treatment in a private clinic. He pined for his distant homeland, and Russian themes continued to provide the basic material for the works he painted during that year. In 1918, he painted The Merchant's Wife, which became the most famous of his paintings.

In 1916, he became paraplegic. "Now my whole world is my room", he wrote. His ability to remain joyful and lively despite his paralysis amazed others. His colourful paintings and joyful genre pieces do not reveal his physical suffering, and on the contrary give the impression of a carefree and cheerful life.

His Pancake Tuesday/Maslenitsa (1916) and Fontanka (1916) are all painted from his memories. He meticulously restores his own childhood in the busy city on the Volga banks.

In the first years after the Russian Revolution of 1917 the artist worked with great inspiration in various fields. Contemporary themes became the basis for his work, being embodied in drawings for calendars and book covers, and in illustrations and sketches of street decorations, as well as some portraits (Portrait of Countess Grabowska).

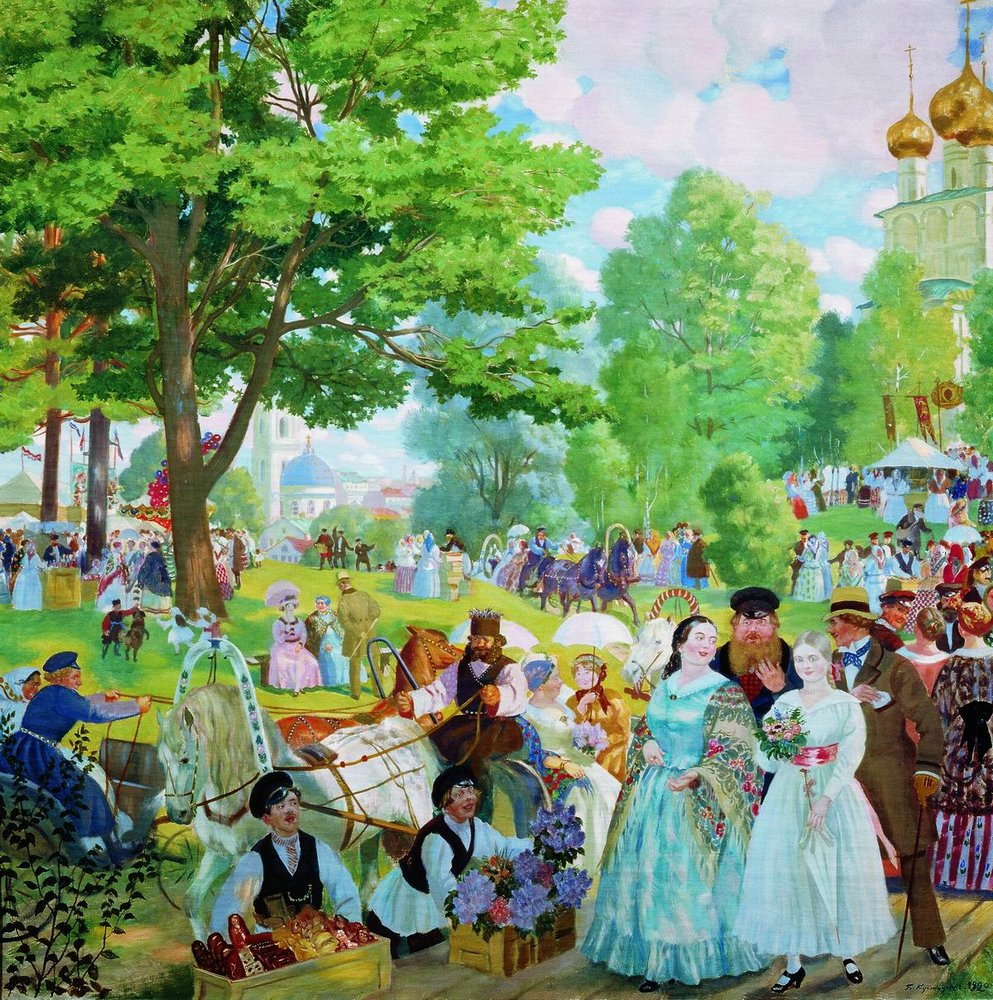
Trinity Day, 1920

His covers for the journals The Red Cornfield and Red Panorama attracted attention because of their vividness and the sharpness of their subject matter. Kustodiev also worked in lithography, illustrating works by Nekrasov. His illustrations for Leskov's stories The Darner and Lady Macbeth of the Mtsensk District were landmarks in the history of Russian book designing, so well did they correspond to the literary images.

=== Stage design ===
The artist was also interested in designing stage scenery. He first started work in the theatre in 1911, when he designed the sets for Alexander Ostrovsky's An Ardent Heart. Such was his success that further orders came pouring in. In 1913, he designed the sets and costumes for The Death of Pazukhin at the Moscow Art Theatre.

His talent in this sphere was especially apparent in his work for Ostrovsky's plays; It's a Family Affair, A Stroke of Luck, Wolves and Sheep, and The Storm. The milieu of Ostrovsky's plays—provincial life and the world of the merchant class—was close to Kustodiev's own genre paintings, and he worked easily and quickly on the stage sets.

In 1923, Kustodiev joined the Association of Artists of Revolutionary Russia. He continued to paint, make engravings, illustrate books, and design for the theater up until his death of tuberculosis on 28 May 1927, in Leningrad.

== Selected works ==
Narrative paintings

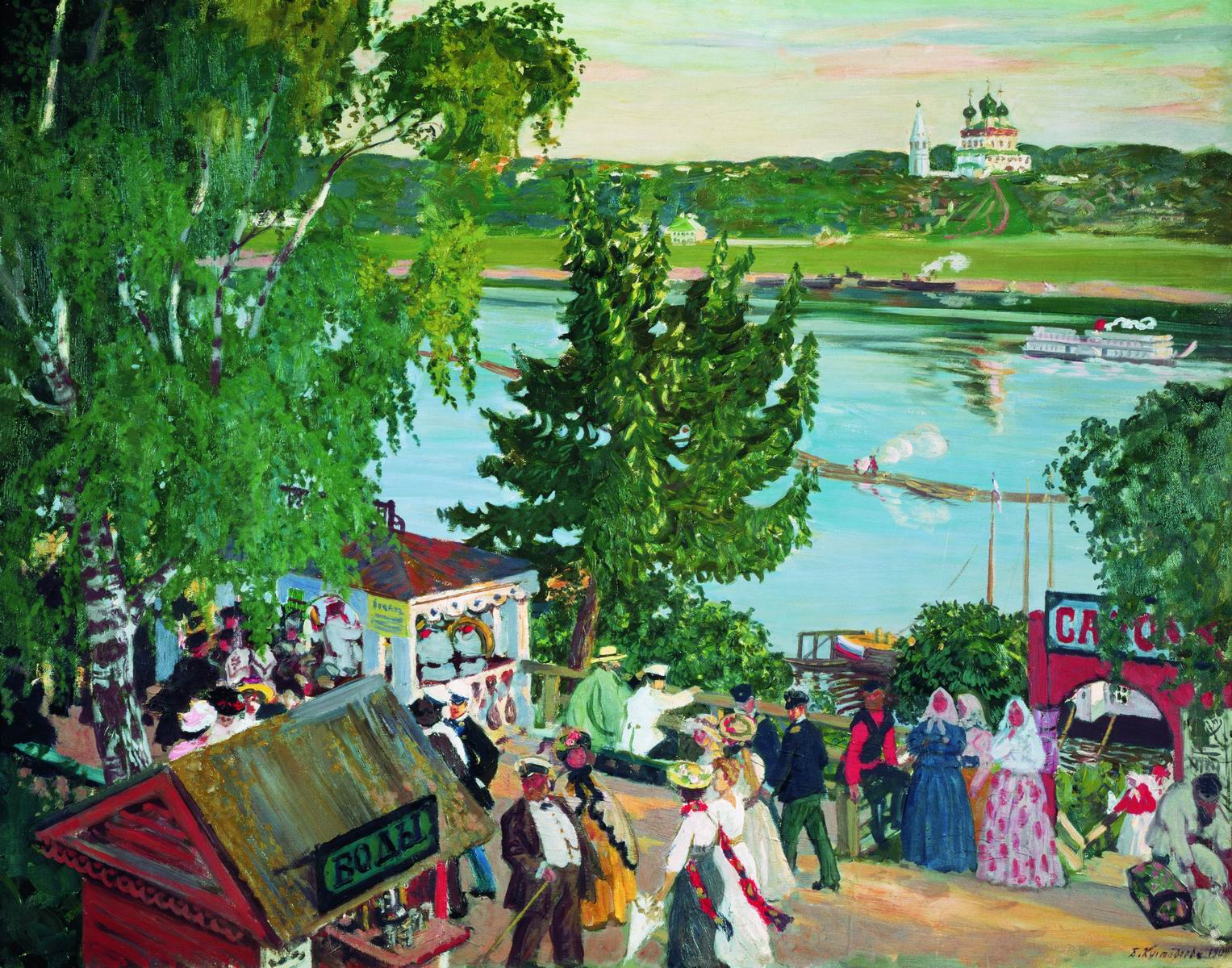
Promenade Along the Volga, 1909

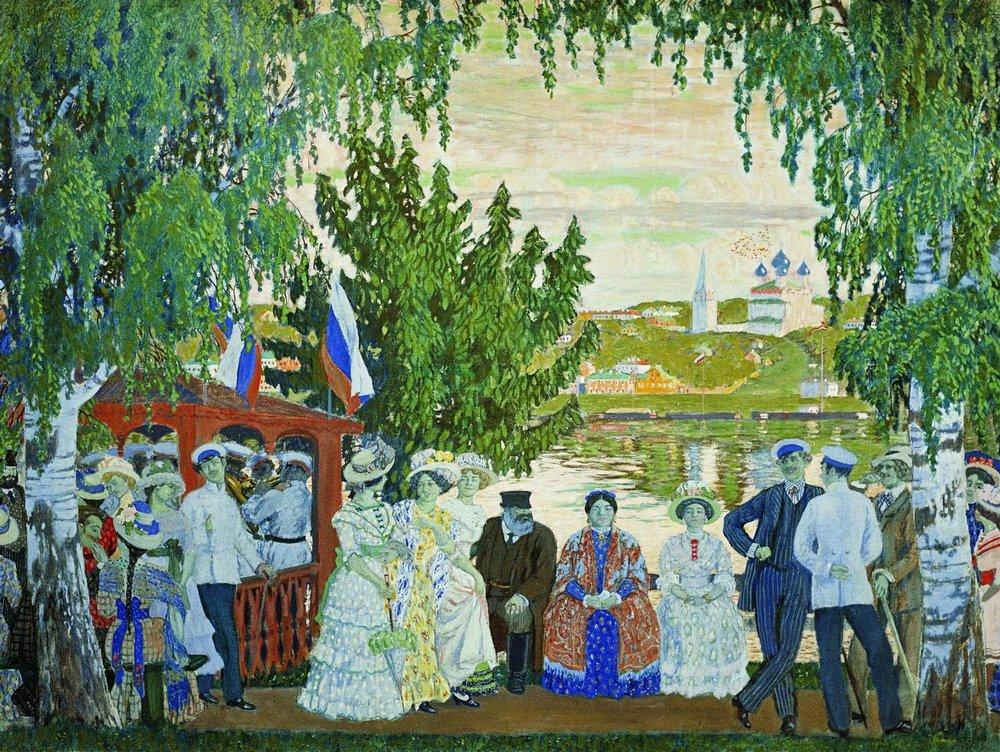
Promenade Along the Volga II, 1909

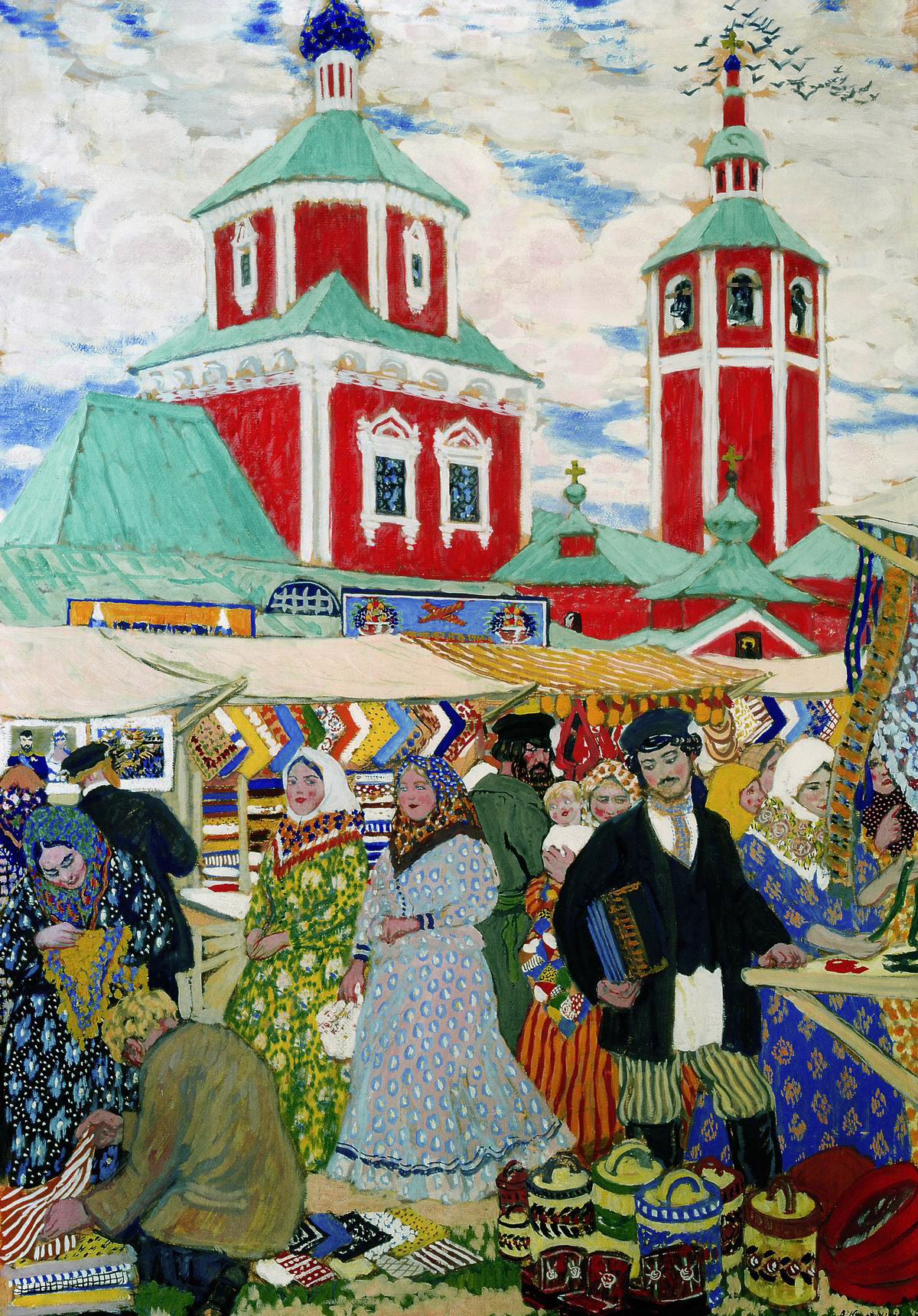
Fair, 1910

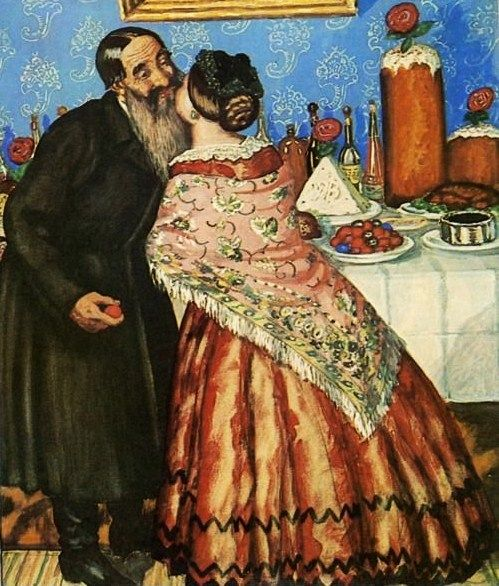
Easter Greetings, 1912

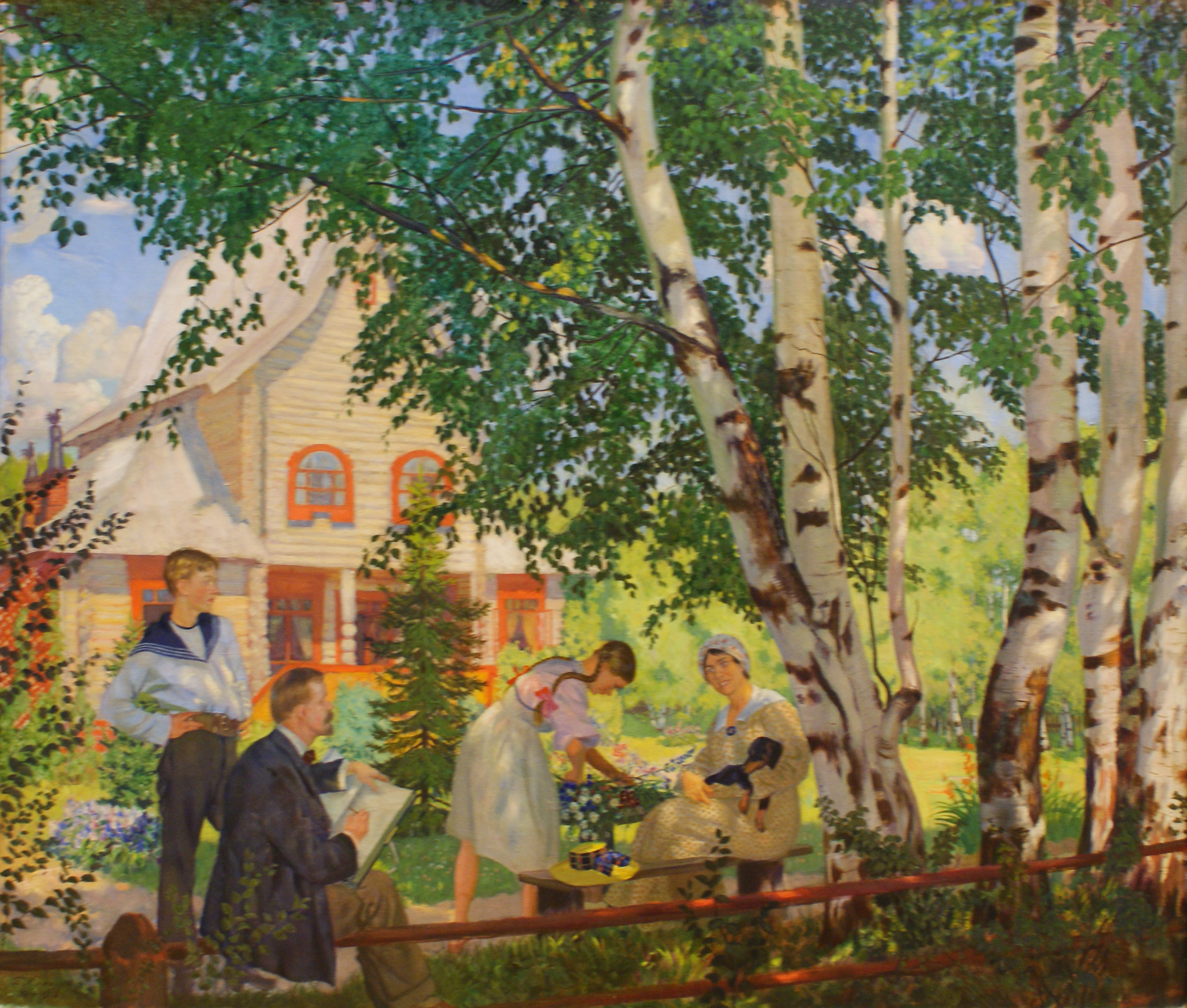
My Home (At the Terem) (1914–1918)

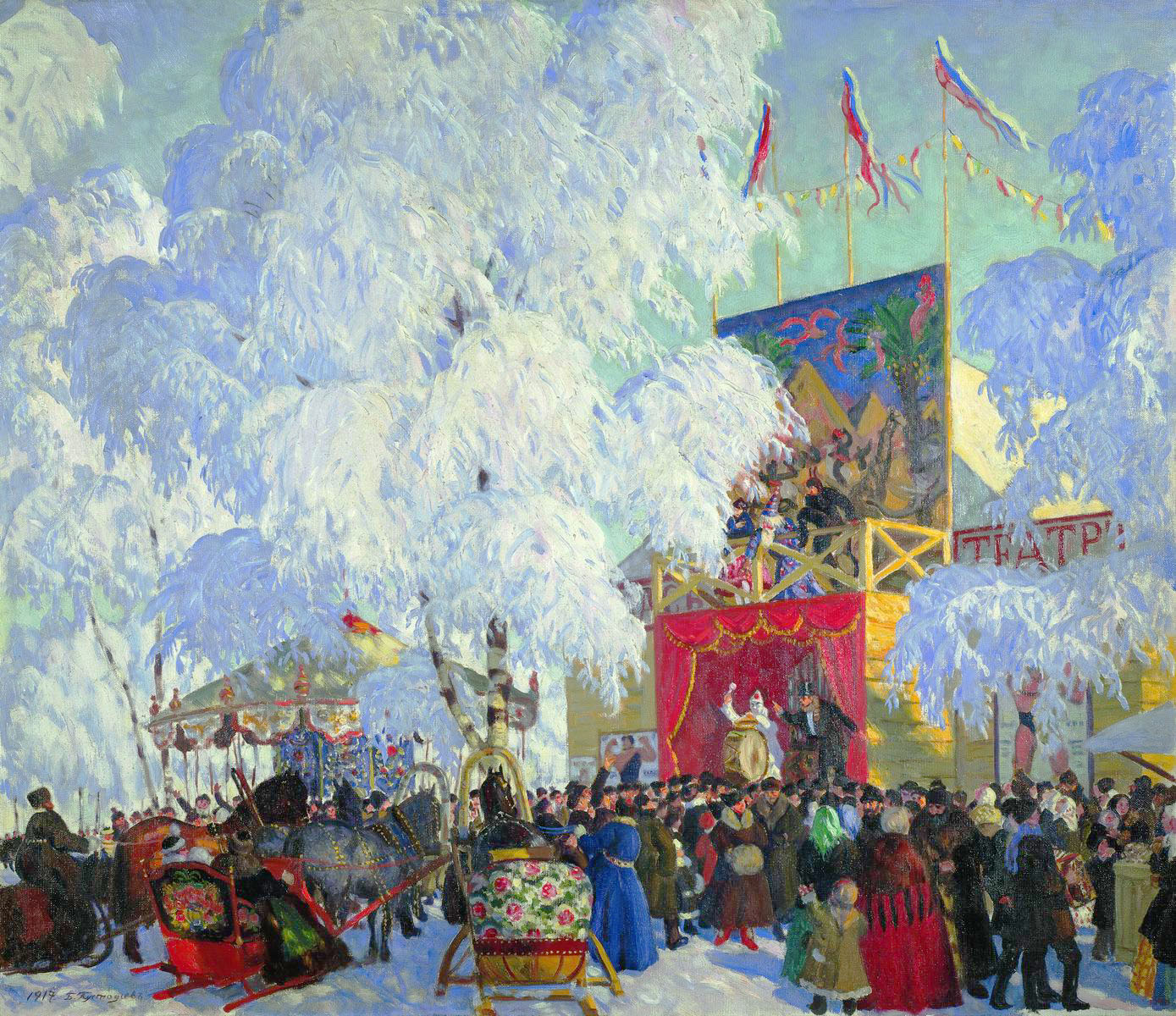
Show Booths, 1916–1920

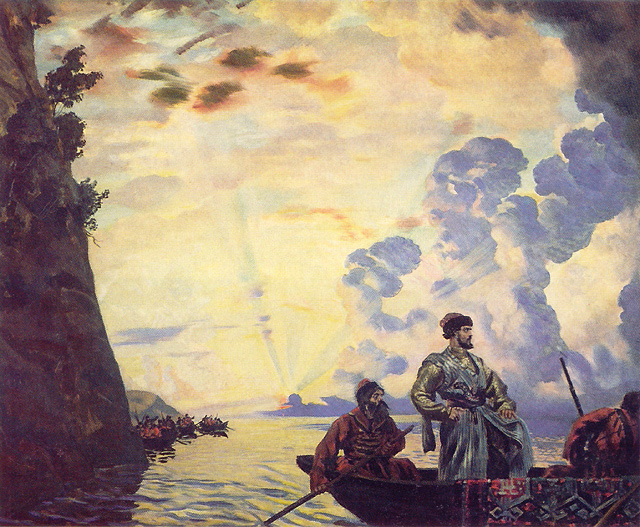
Stenka Razin, 1918

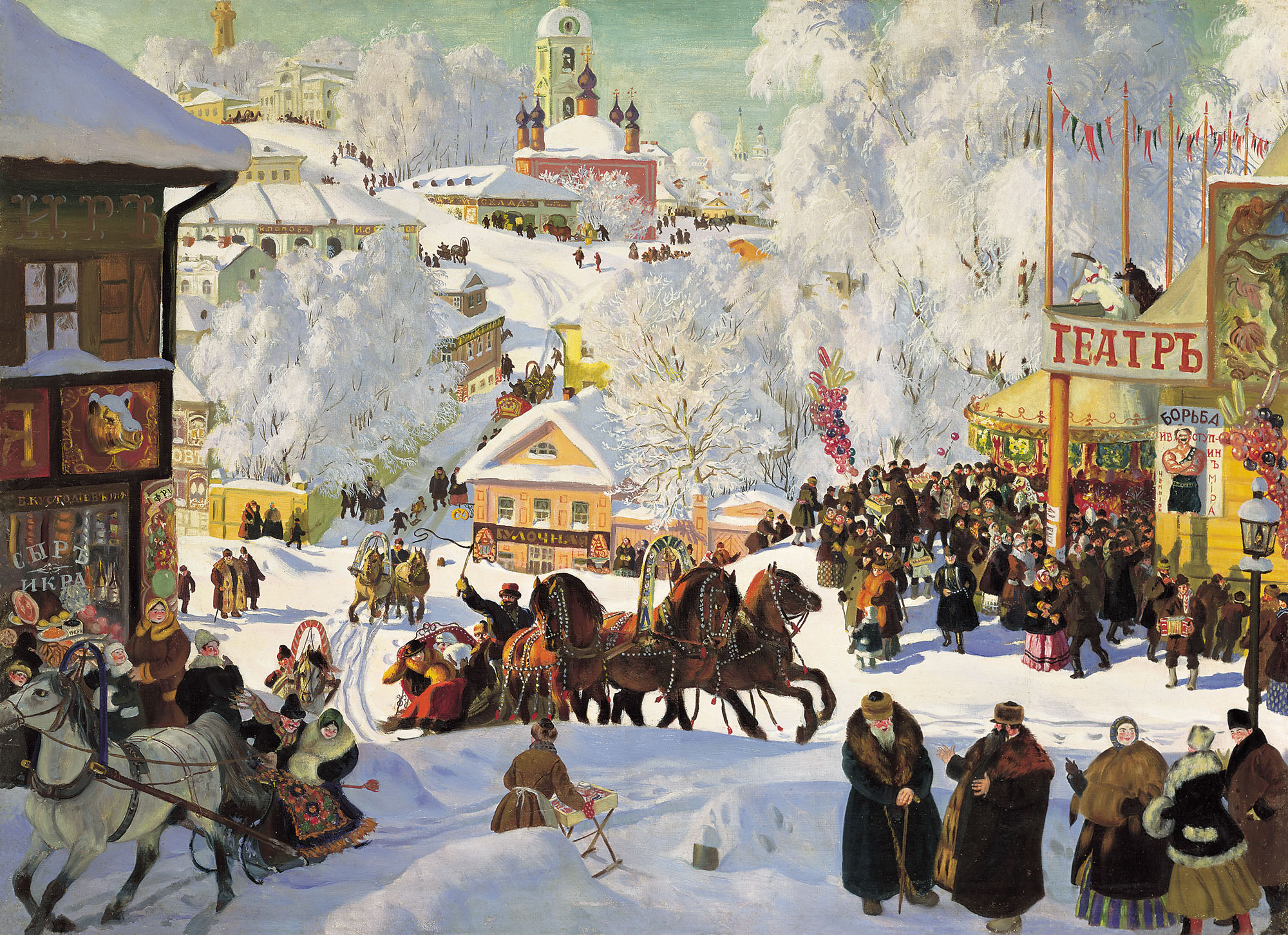
Pancake Tuesday, 1919

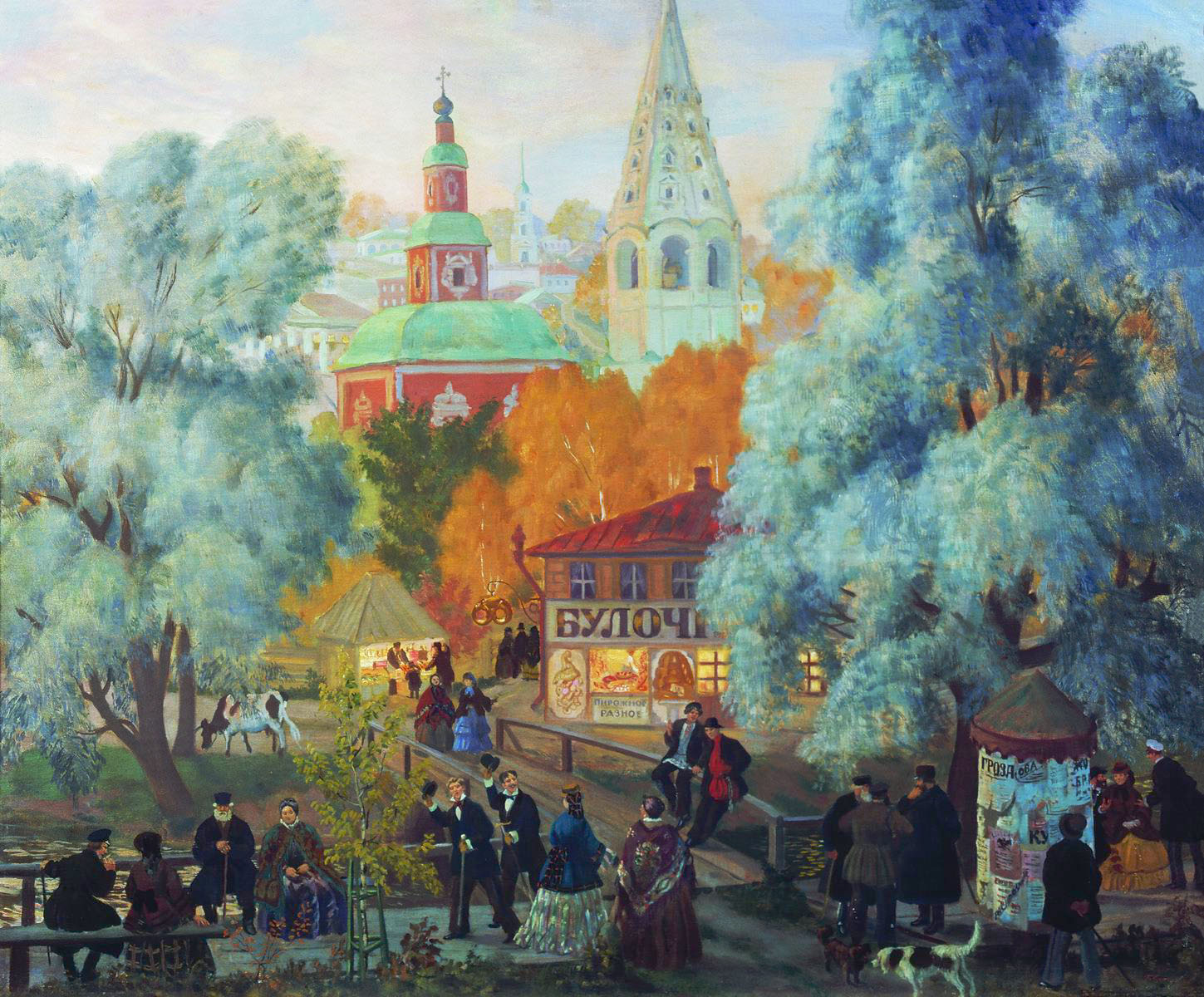
Country, 1919

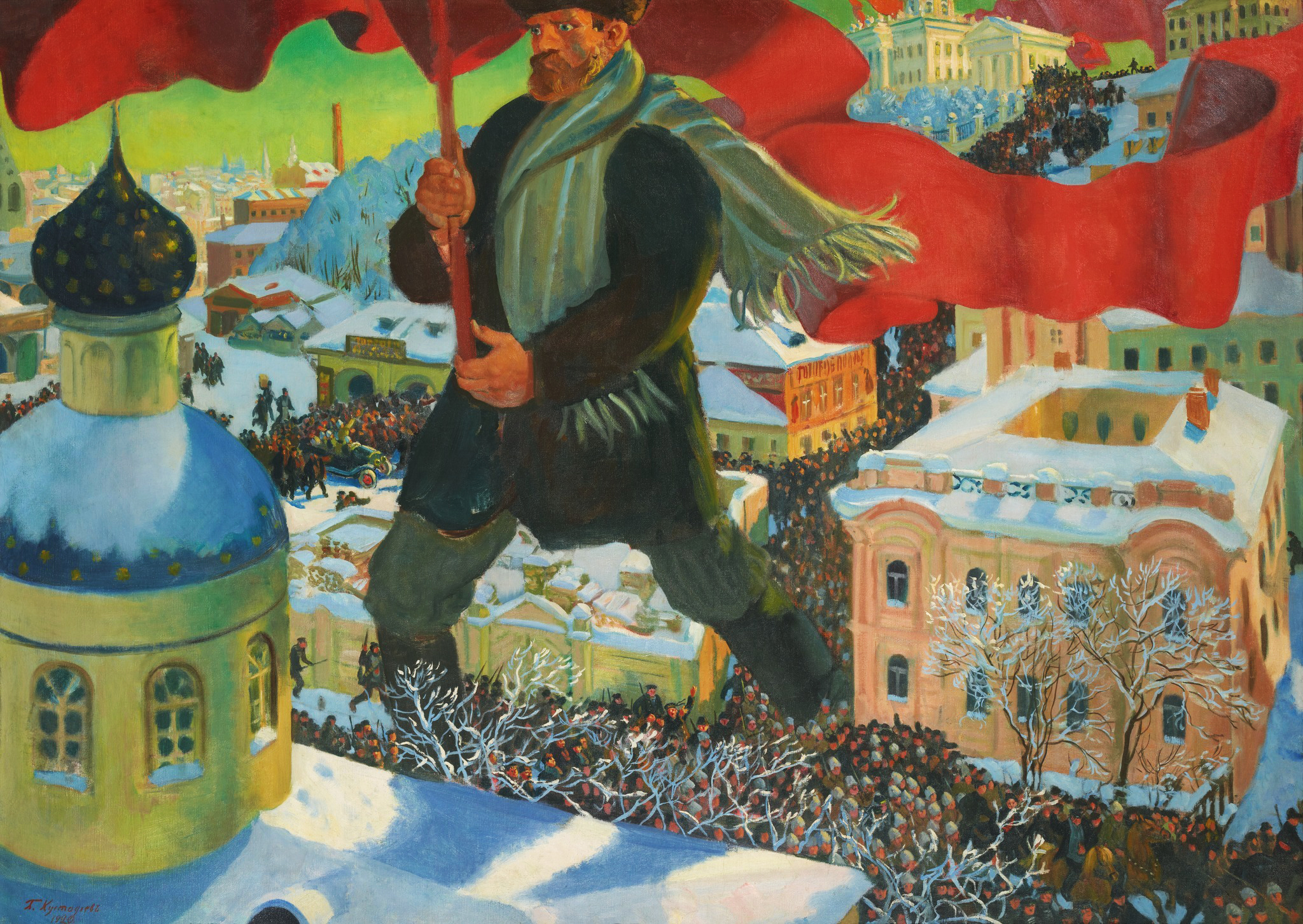
The Bolshevik, 1920

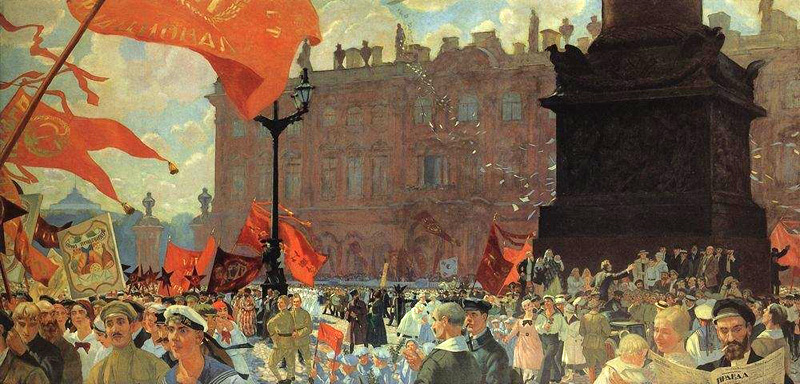
Festival of the II Congress of Comintern, 1921

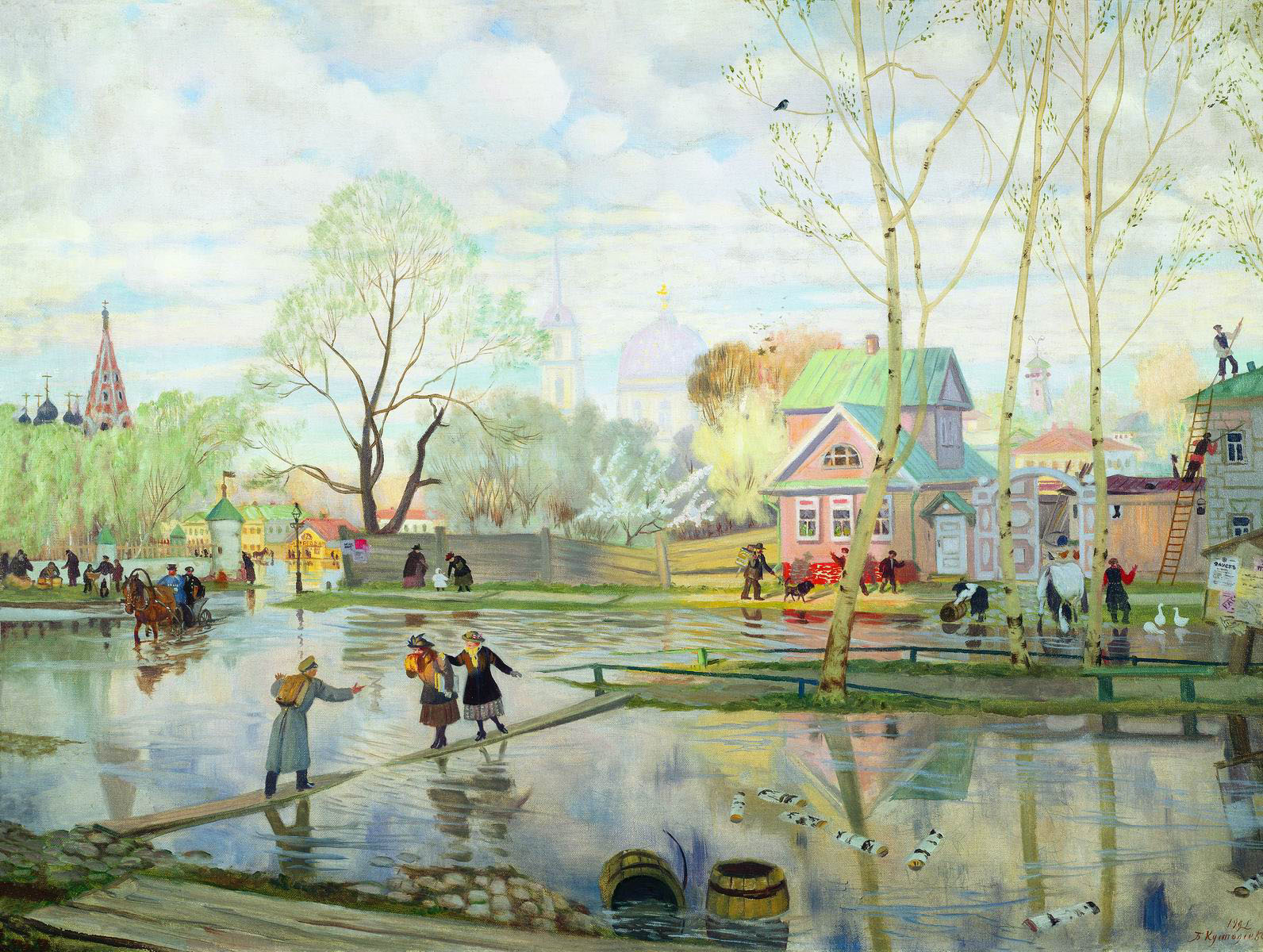
Spring, 1921

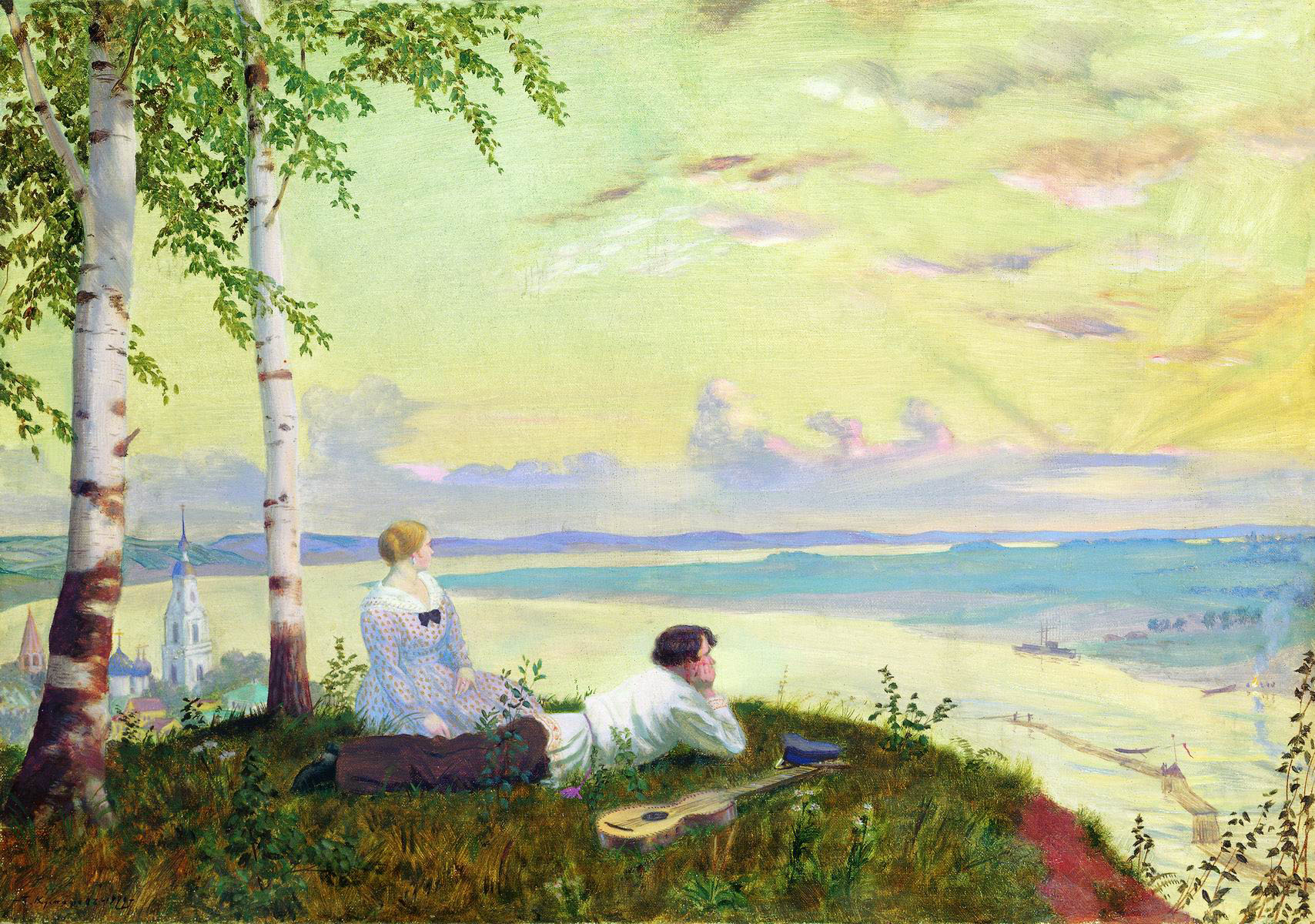
Looking at the Volga (1922)
Portraits

Ivan Bilibin, 1901

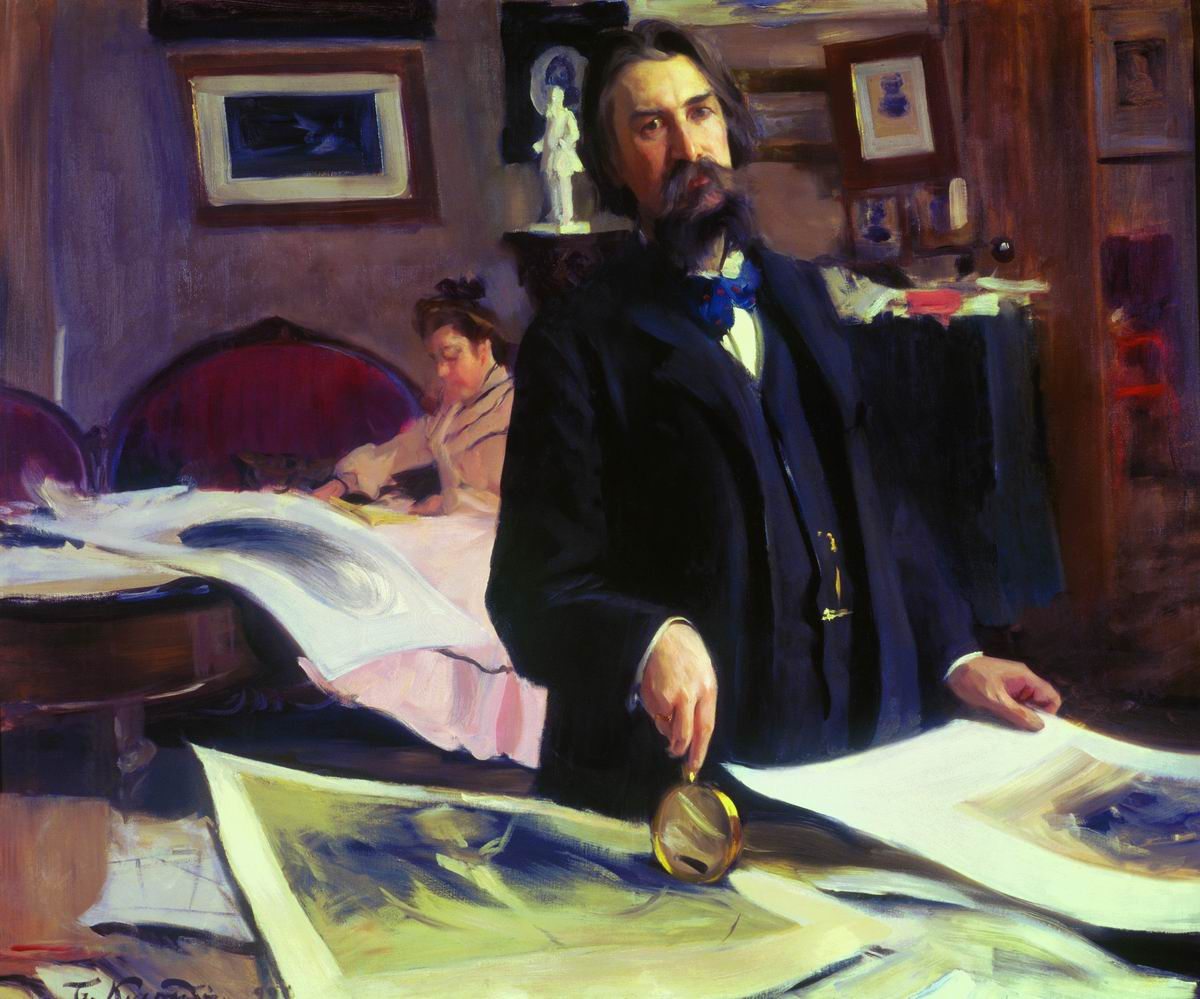
Vasily Mate, 1902

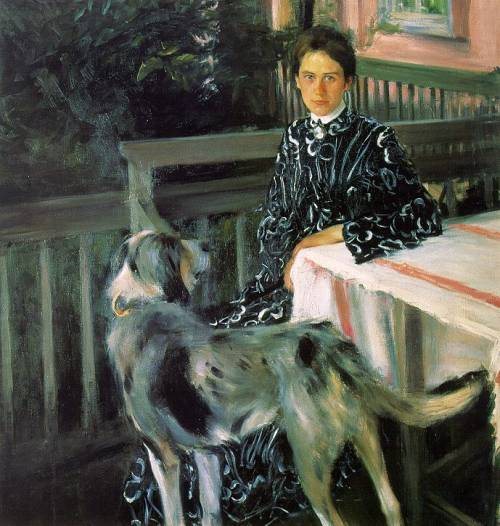
Yulia Kustodieva (née Proshinskaya), the painter's spouse, 1903

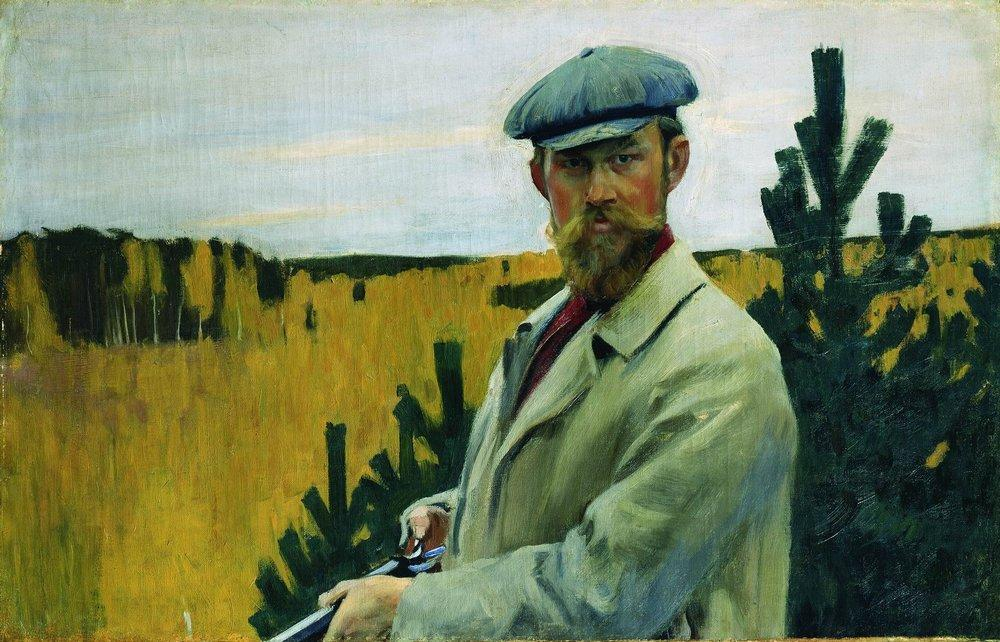
At the Hunt, self-portrait, 1905

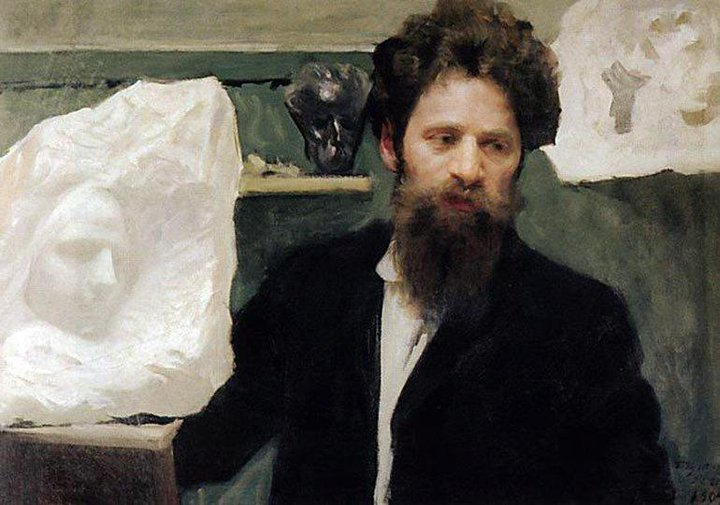
Naoum Aronson, c. 1910

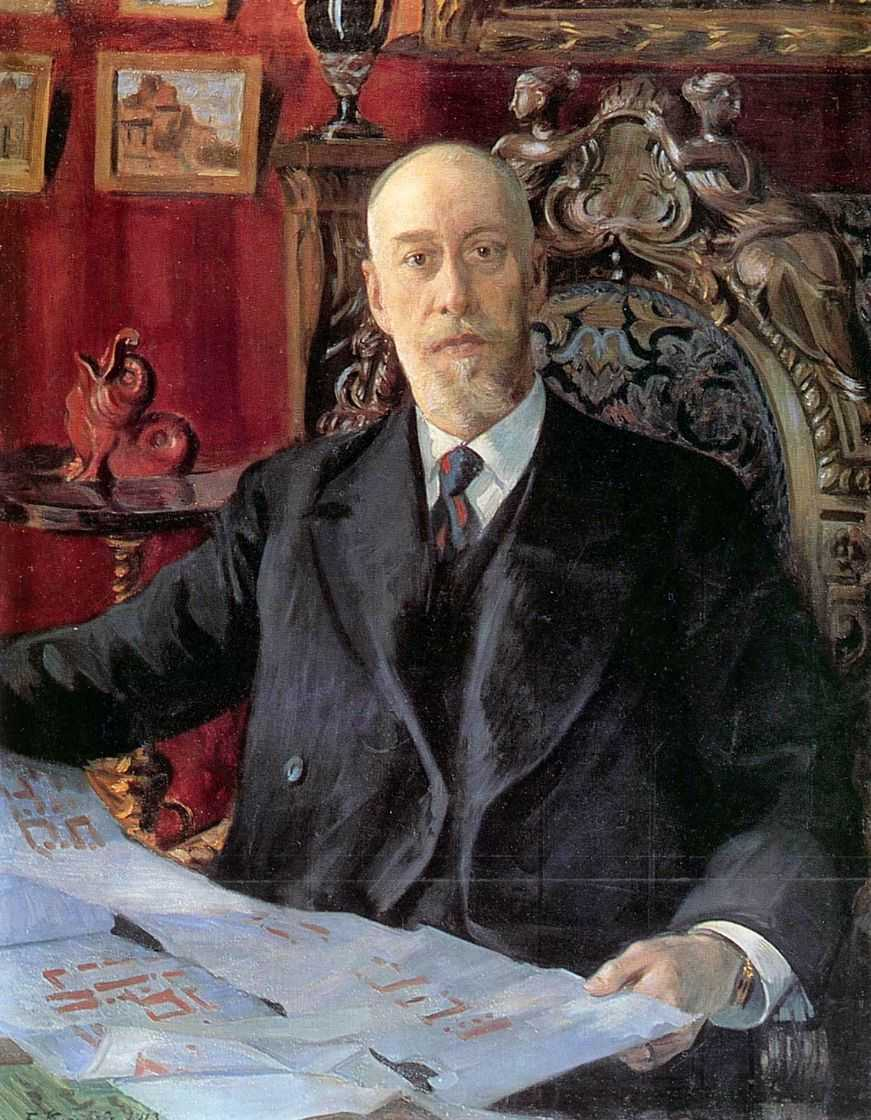
Nikolai von Meck, 1913

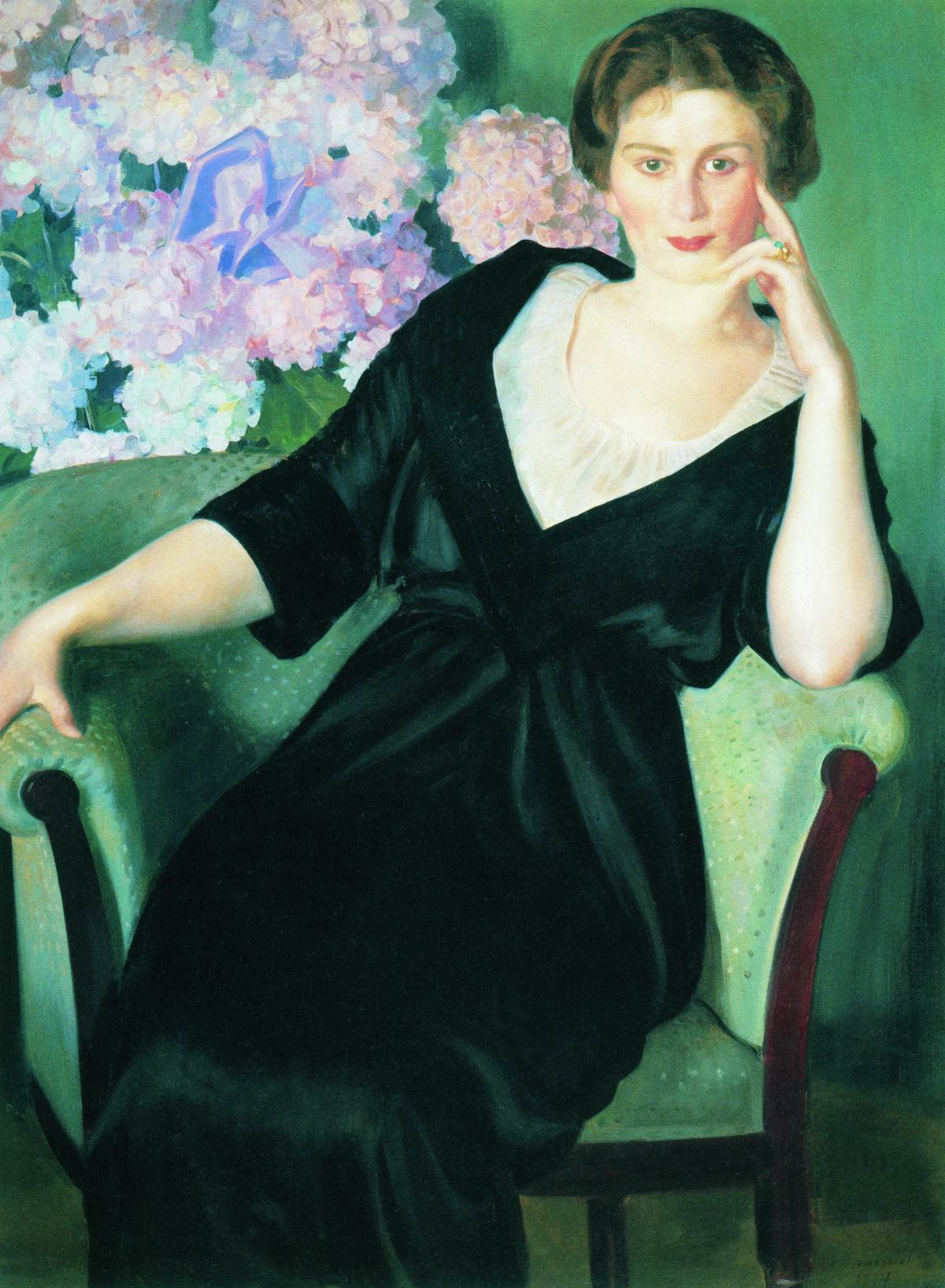
Renee Notgaft, 1914

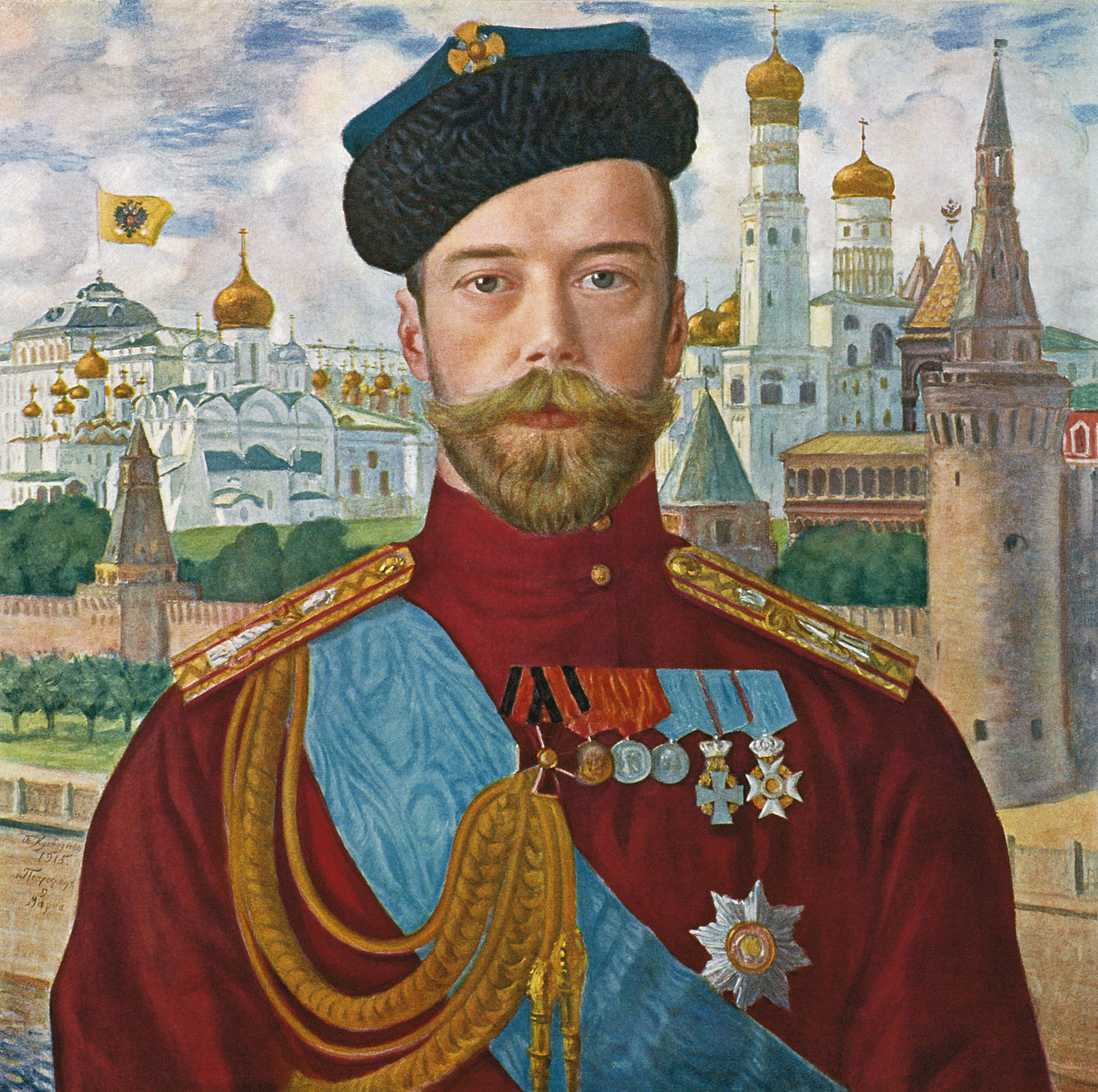
Tsar Nicholas II, 1915

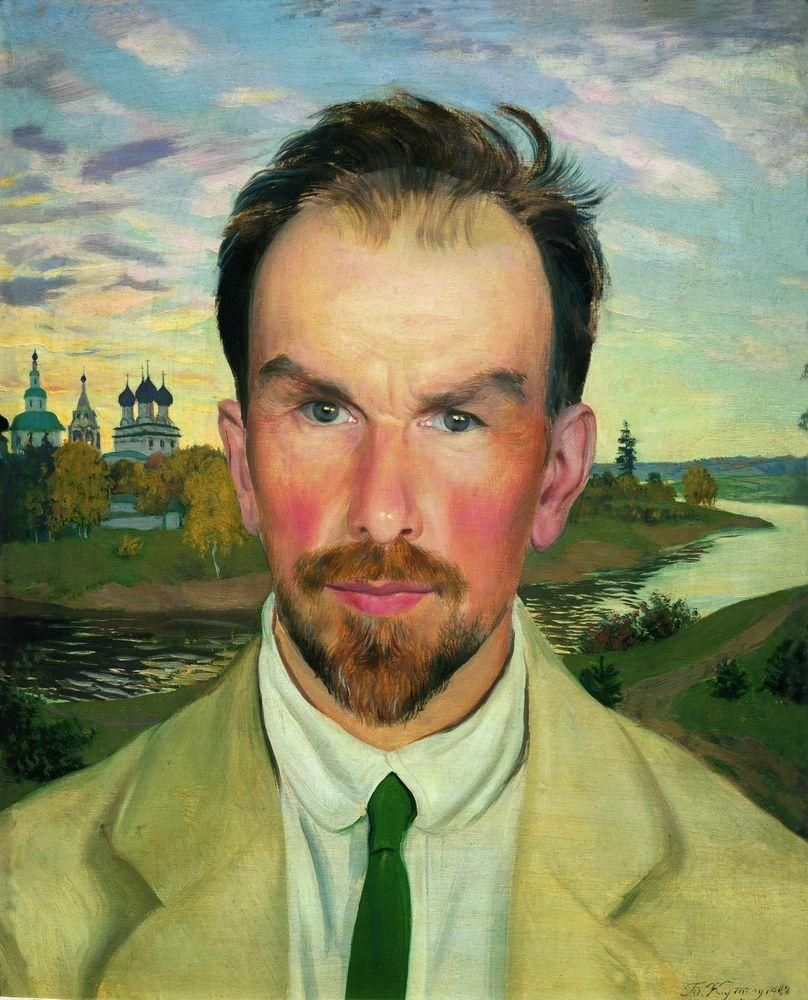
Aleksandr Anisimov, 1915

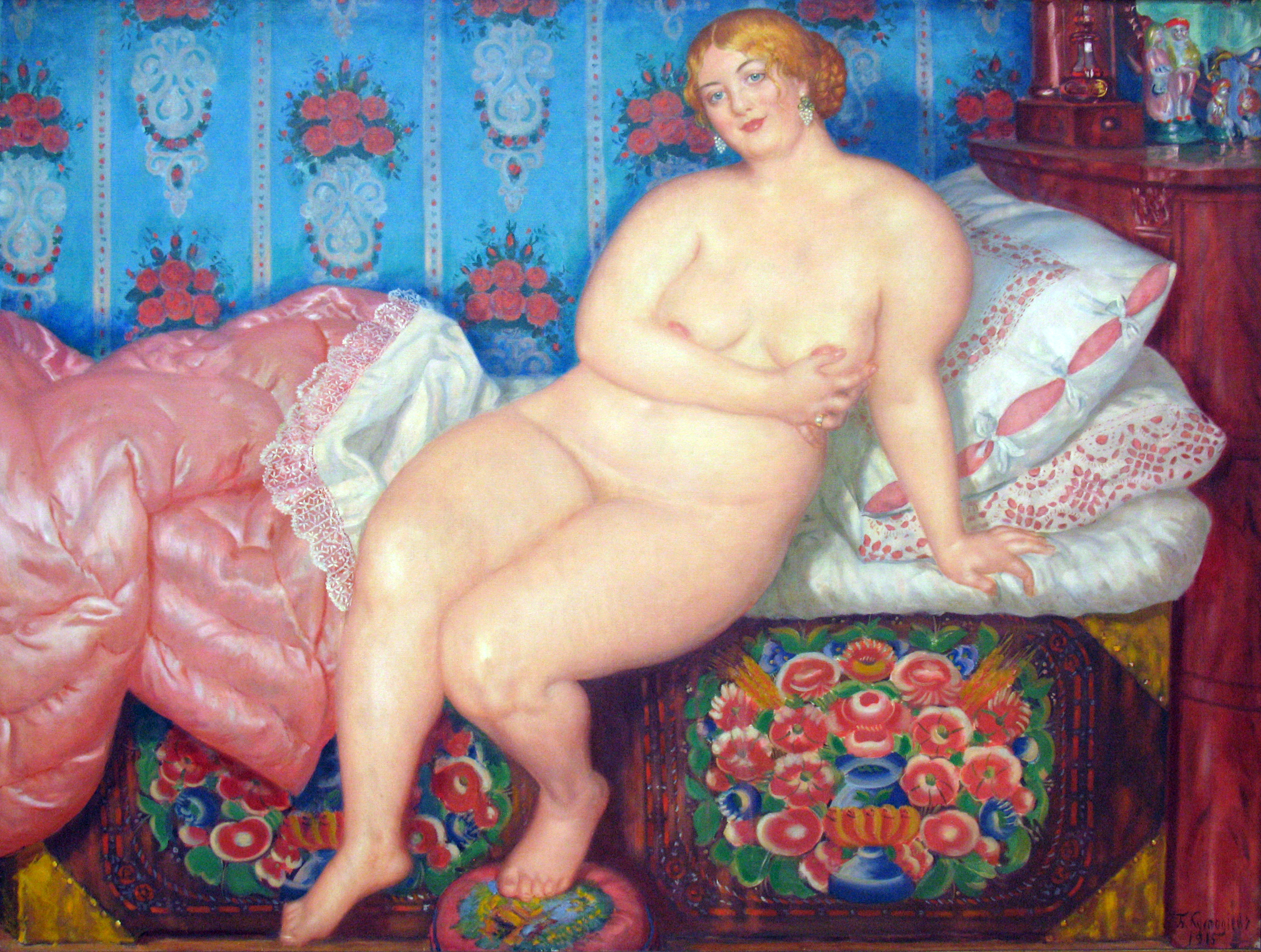
The Beauty, a portrayal of actress Faina Shevchenko, 1915

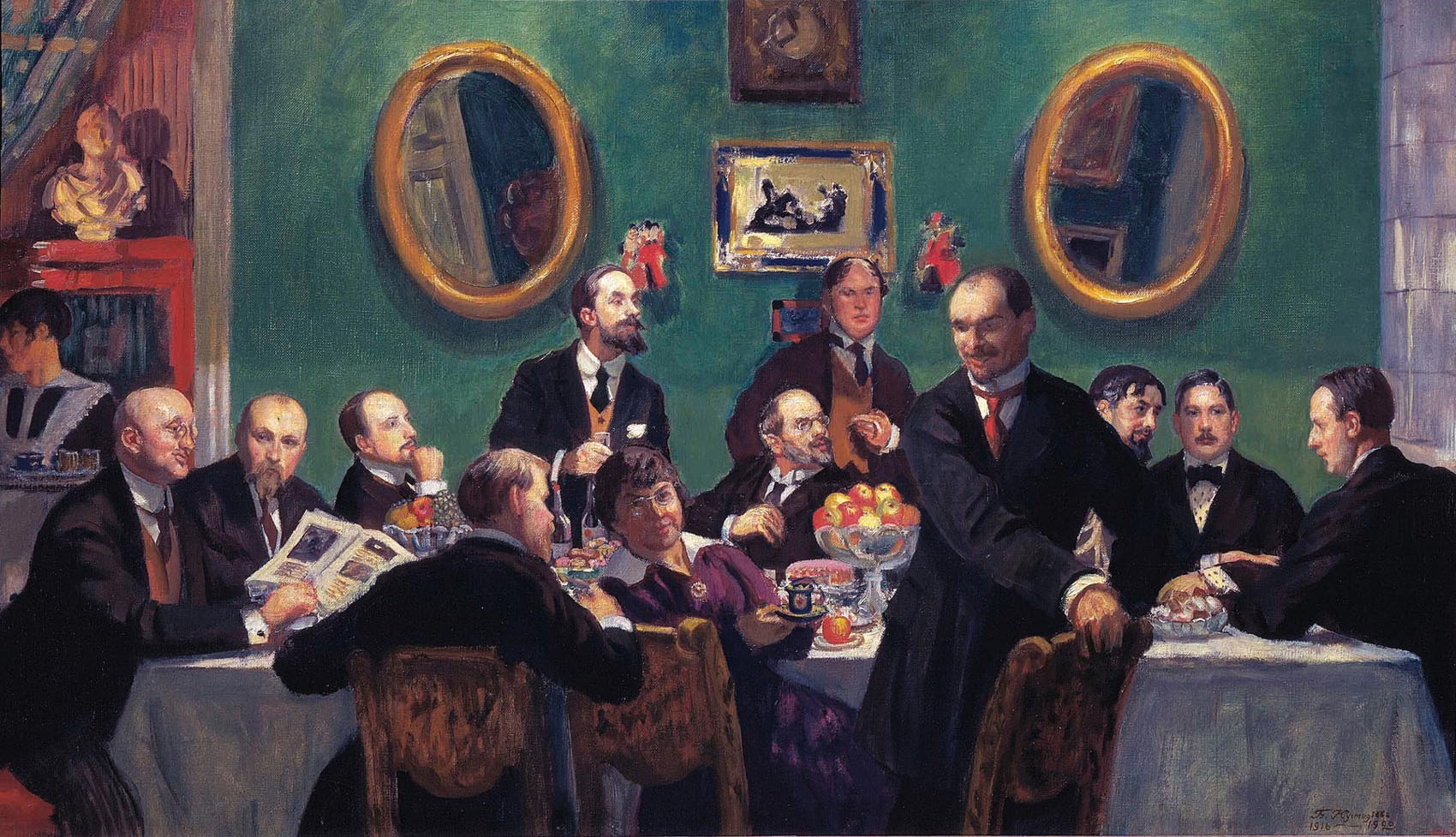
The Miriskussniki

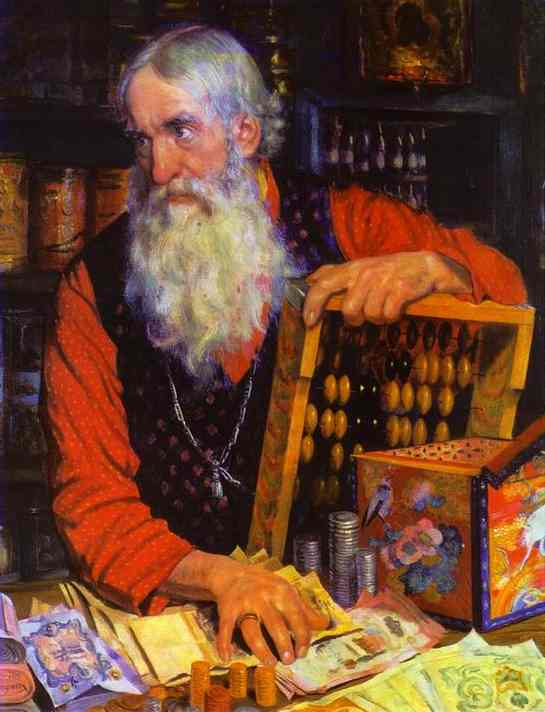
The Merchant, 1918

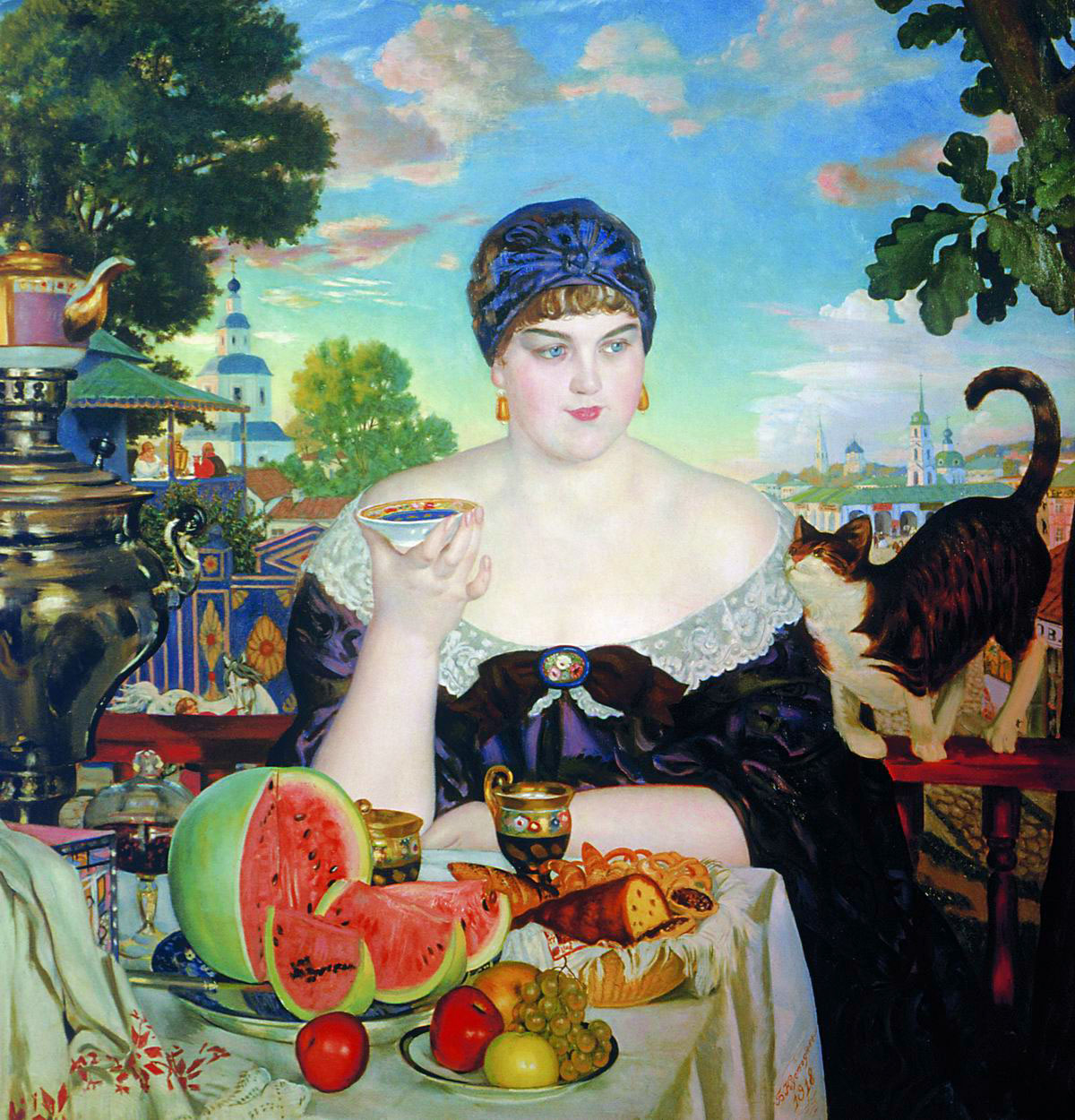
The Merchant's Wife, 1918

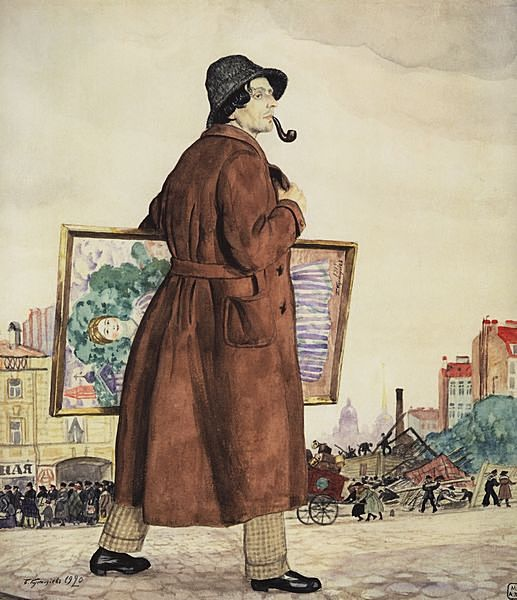
Isaak Brodsky, 1920

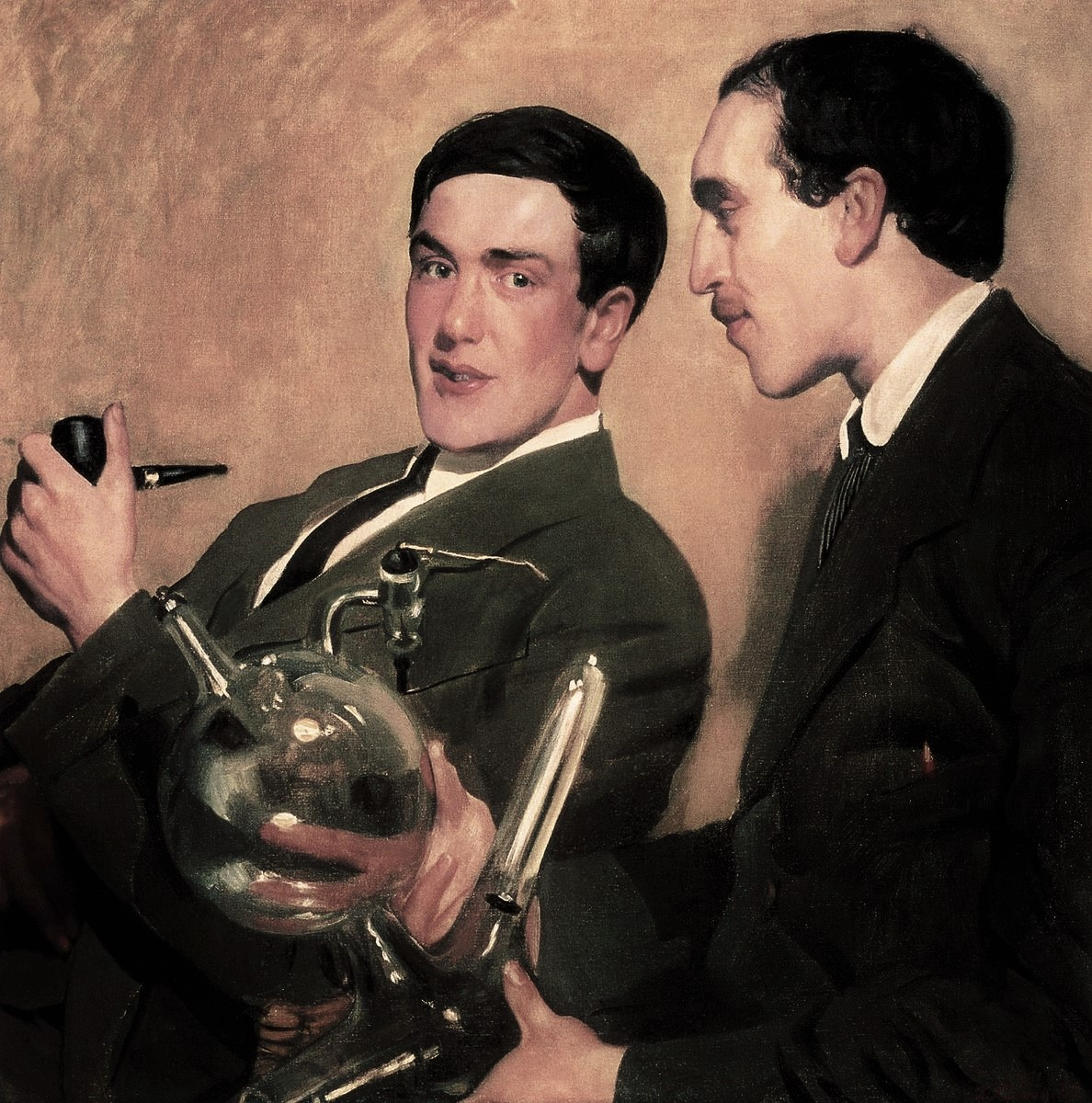
Pyotr Kapitsa and Nikolay Semyonov, 1921

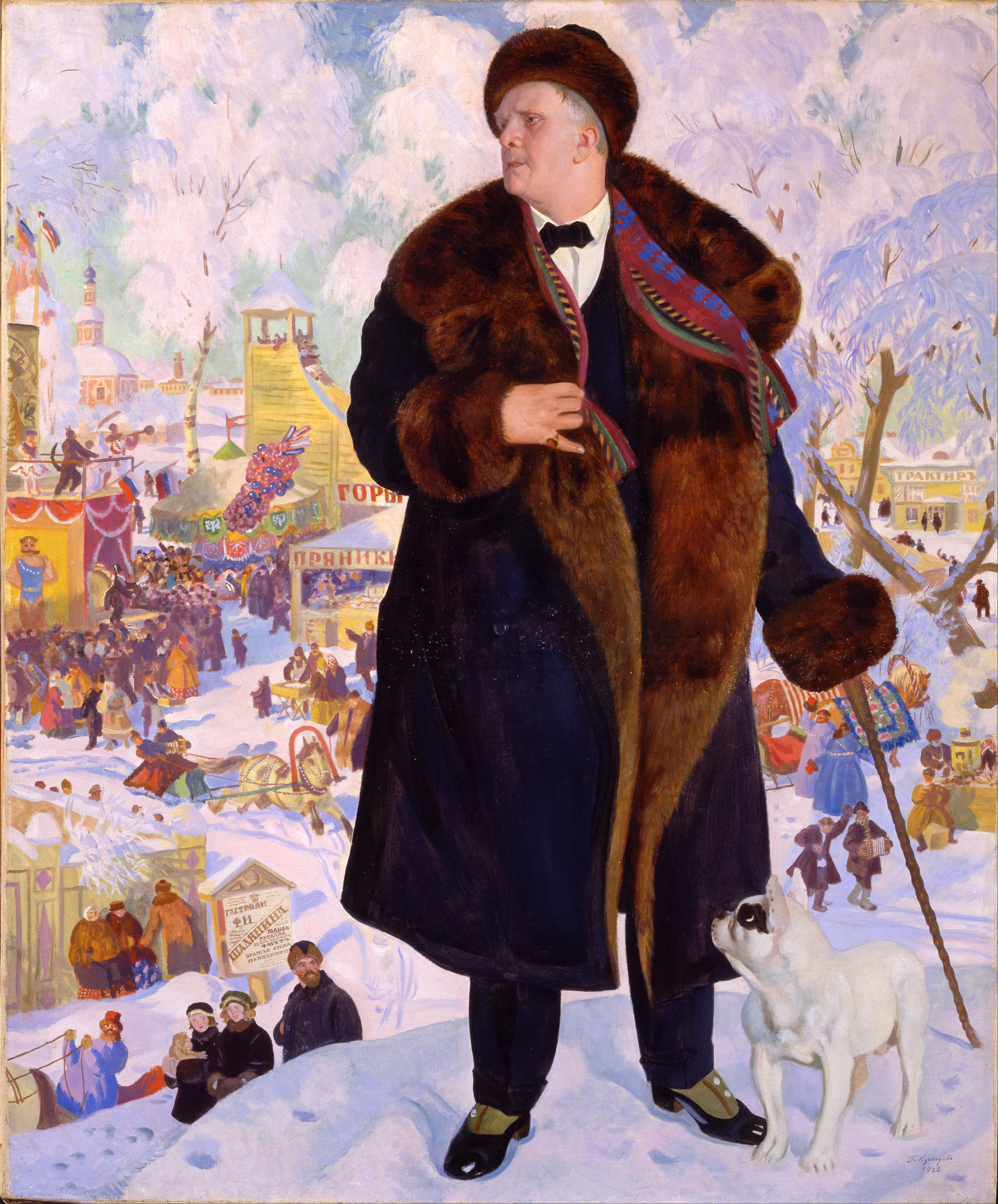
Feodor Chaliapin, 1922

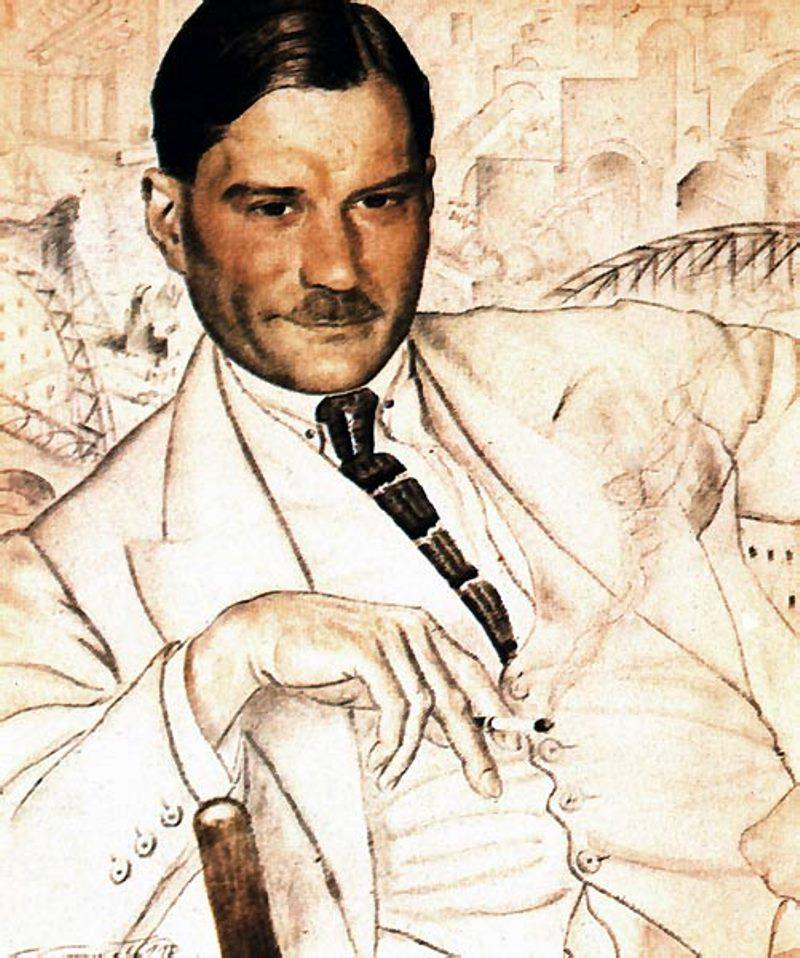
Yevgeny Zamyatin, 1923

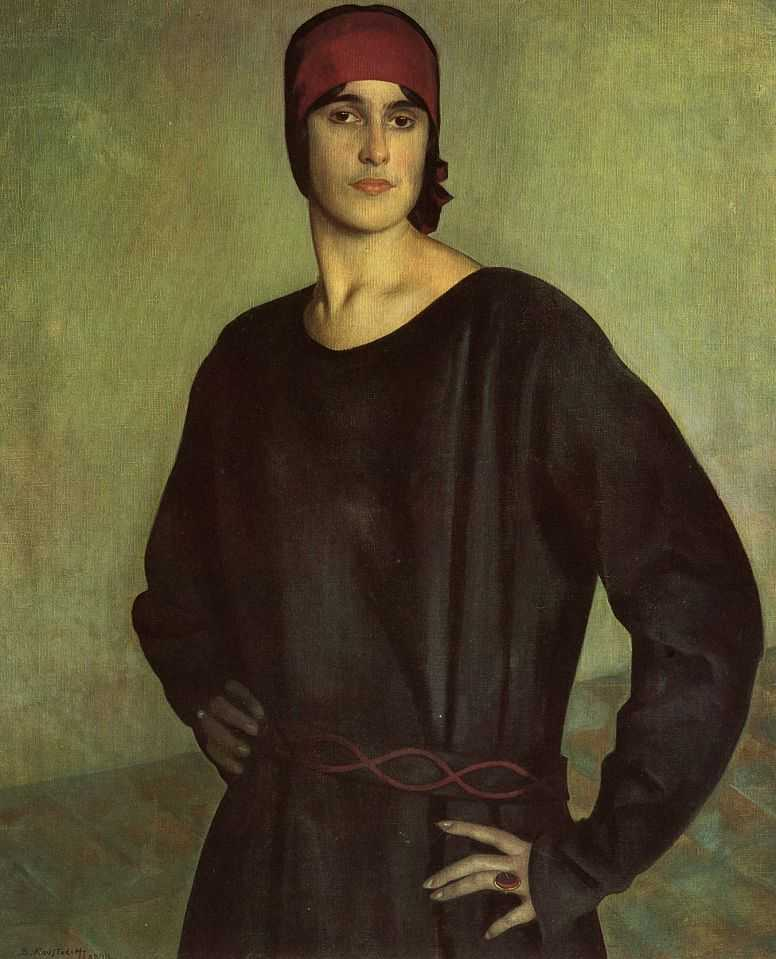
Tatiana Chizhova, 1924

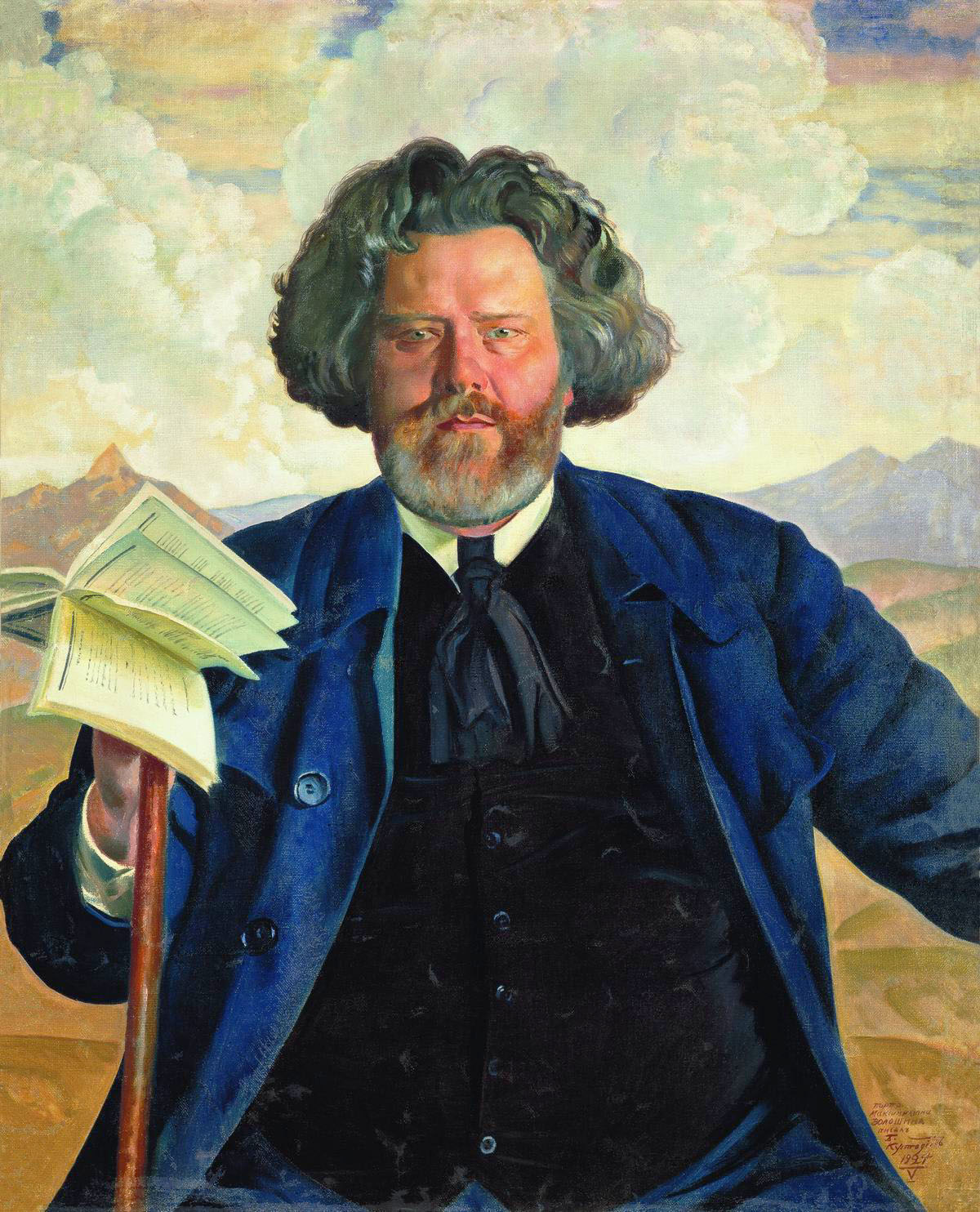
Maximilian Voloshin, 1924

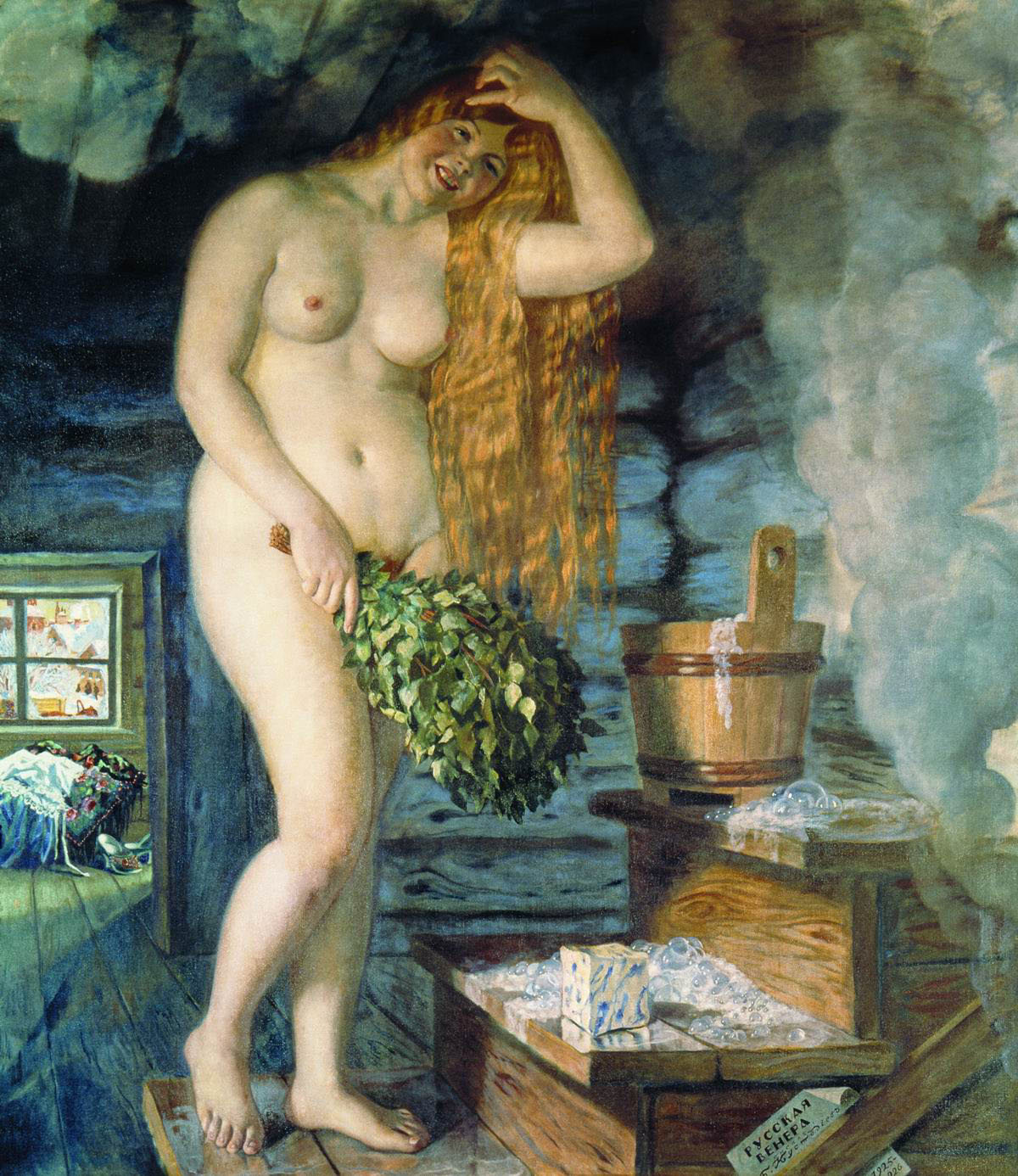
Russian Venus, 1926

== See also ==
- List of Russian artists
