= Faina Shevchenko =

Russian actor

- Born: Фаина Васильевна Шевченко; 17 March 1893; Voronezh, Russian Empire
- Died: 10 May 1971 (aged 78); Moscow, Soviet Union
- Occupation: Actress
- Awards: Order of Lenin (1938), Order of the Red Banner of Labour (1937, 1948), Stalin Prize (1943, 1946)

Faina Vasilyevna Shevchenko (Russian: Фаина Васильевна Шевченко, born 17 July 1893 — died 10 May 1971) was a Russian and Soviet stage and film actress, the People's Artist of the USSR (1948) and the recipient of several high-profile state awards (including the Order of Lenin, 1938) and twice the Stalin Prize laureate (1943, 1946).

== Career ==
One of the leading actresses of the Moscow Art Theatre (where she debuted in 1914 and stayed until 1959), Shevchenko excelled in Russian drama classics and was best remembered for her roles in the plays by Alexander Ostrovsky, including Enough Stupidity in Every Wise Man (1920), An Ardent Heart (1926), The Storm (1934), The Last Victim (1944) and The Forest (1948), as well as by Maxim Gorky (The Lower Depths, 1916). She was cast in seven films, including David Guramishvili (1946), The Composer Glinka (1952) and The Lower Depths (1952). "Dazzlingly simple, vivid, filled to the brim with life, endowed with huge temperament and open heart," was how the theatre historian Pavel Markov described her in his book of memoirs.

She was said to be the artist Boris Kustodiev's favourite model and, as a 21-year-old, sat nude for his The Beauty sessions. This daring venture caused scandal and almost cost Shevchenko her place in the troupe.
