= List of burials at Tikhvin Cemetery =

Burials in a cemetery in St. Petersburg, Russia

Coordinates: 59.922829°N 30.386317°E

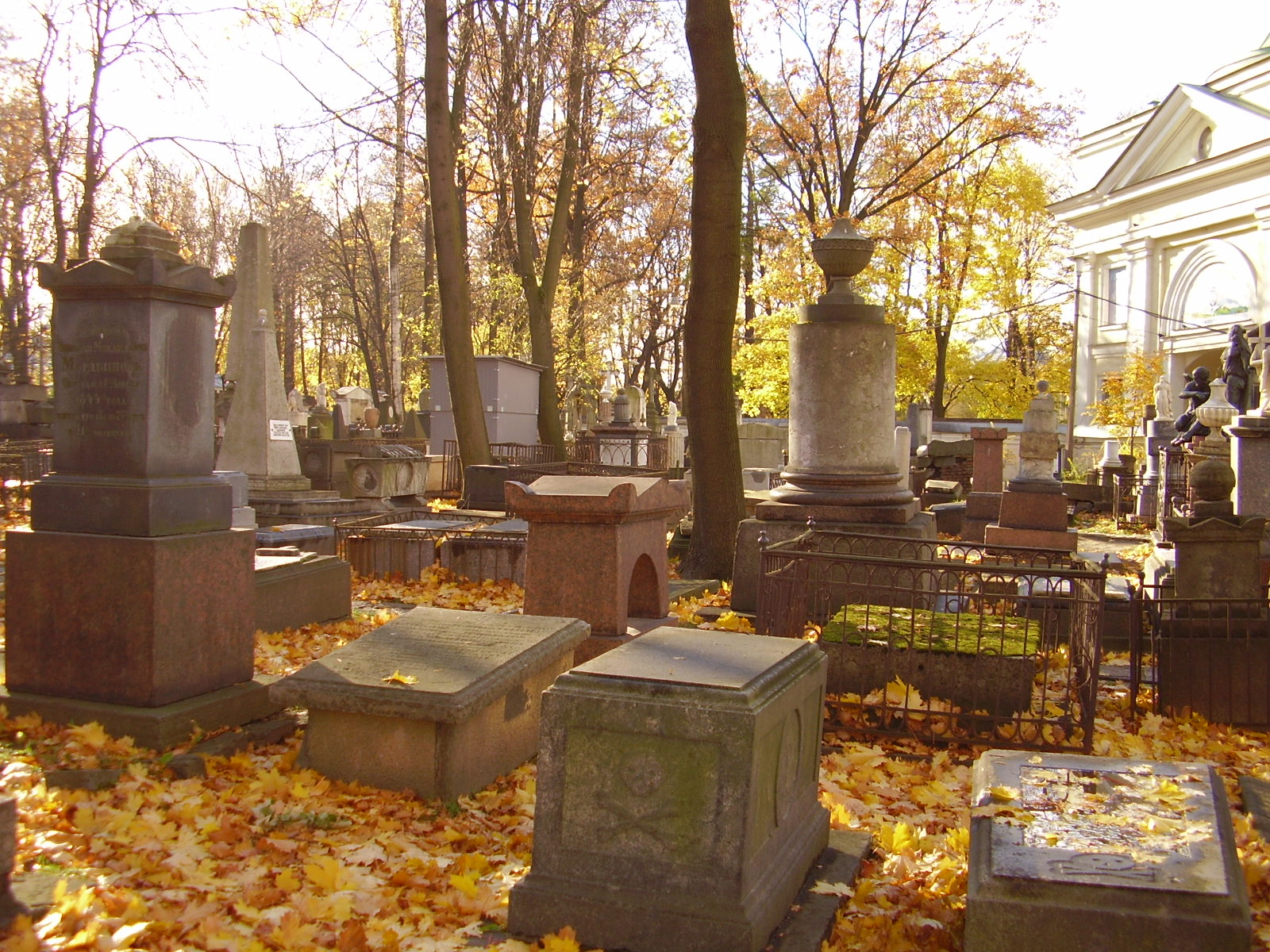
Graves and monuments in the Tikhvin Cemetery

Tikhvin Cemetery (Russian: Тихвинское кладбище) is a historic cemetery in the centre of Saint Petersburg. It is part of the Alexander Nevsky Lavra and contains a large number of burials, including many notable Russian figures. It is administered by the State Museum of Urban Sculpture, which refers to it as the Necropolis of the Masters of Art (Russian: Некрополь мастеров искусств).

During the nineteenth and early twentieth centuries it was a popular burial site for statesmen and military personnel. Among those buried here were naval officers Fyodor Dubasov, Yuri Lisyansky, Pyotr Ricord, Zinovy Rozhestvensky and Alexei Senyavin; army officers Apostol Kostanda, Nikolay Leontiev, Valerian Madatov and Alexander Mikhailovsky-Danilevsky; and statesmen Alexander Abaza, Dmitry Bludov, Pavel Demidov, Ivan Durnovo, Mikhail Speransky and Pyotr Valuyev. Relatively few of these graves have survived to the present day. Scientists Sergey Lebedev and Ivan Tarkhanov were also buried here.

The cemetery is most famous for its representatives from the arts world, some of whom were originally buried here, while others were reinterred here during the Soviet period. Composers and musicians buried in the cemetery include Alexander Borodin, César Cui, Alexander Dargomyzhsky, Alexander Glazunov, Mikhail Glinka, Modest Mussorgsky, Nikolai Rimsky-Korsakov, Anton Rubinstein and Pyotr Ilyich Tchaikovsky. Actors and performers Varvara Asenkova, Nikolay Cherkasov, Vera Komissarzhevskaya, Marius Petipa and Georgy Tovstonogov are buried here, as are painters and sculptors Mikhail Avilov, Vasily Demut-Malinovsky, Alexander Ivanov, Ivan Kramskoi, Boris Kustodiev and Ivan Shishkin. Luminaries from the world of literature represented in the cemetery include Yevgeny Baratynsky, Fyodor Dostoevsky, Ivan Gorbunov, Nikolay Karamzin, Ivan Krylov and Vladimir Stasov. The early feminist Nadezhda Stasova is also buried at Tikhvin.

== Establishment ==
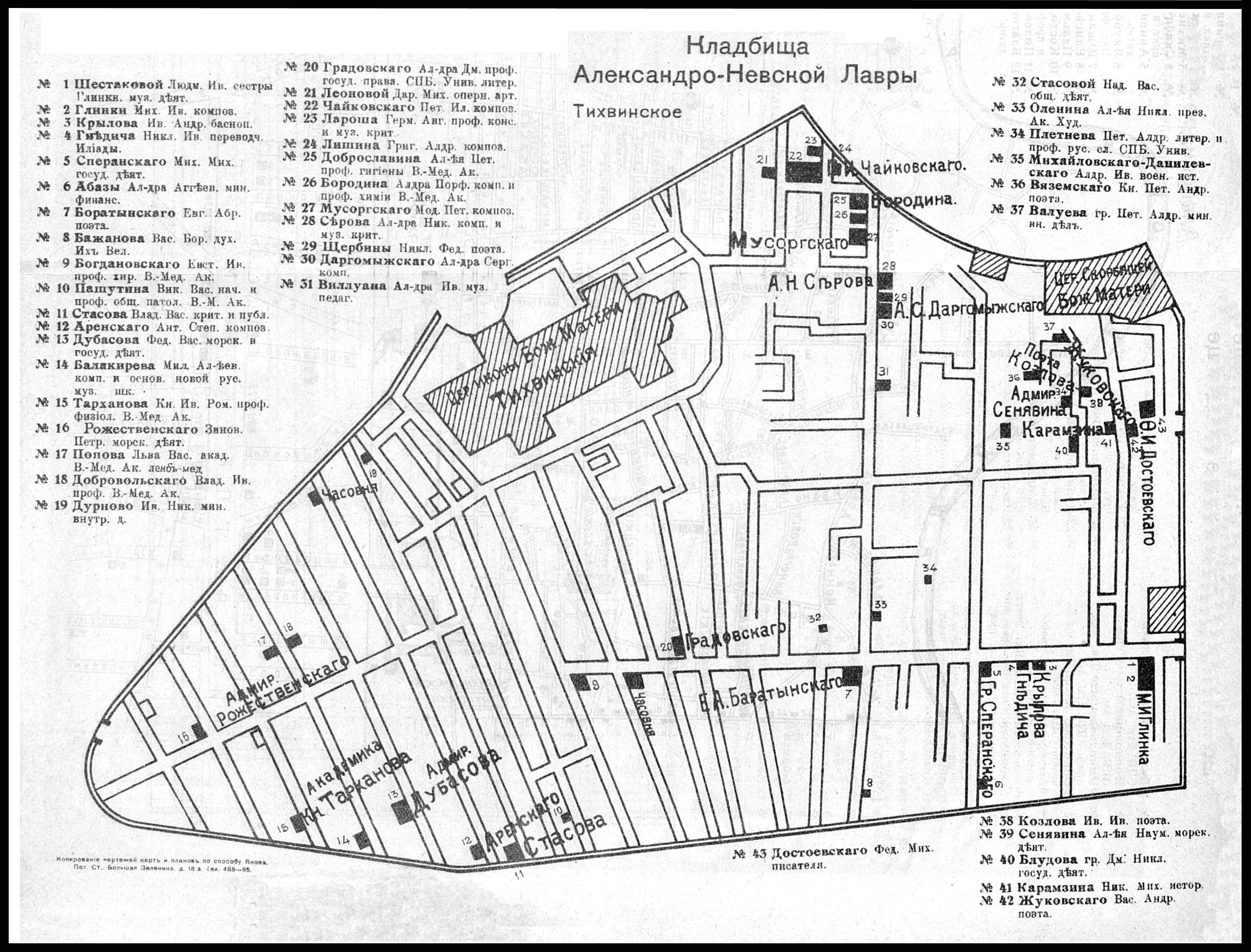
The plan of the cemetery as it was in 1914

The cemetery opened in 1823 to relieve overcrowding in the monastery's Lazarevskoe Cemetery. Initially called the "New Lazarevsky" (Russian: Ново-Лазаревским), it quickly expanded to cover a large area. Its cemetery church was consecrated in 1871 in the name of the icon of the Tikhvin Mother of God, from which the cemetery took its name. Burials initially took place in the eastern part of the cemetery, and in 1826 the writer Nikolay Karamzin was buried in the cemetery, followed in 1833 by Nikolay Gnedich, a contemporary of Alexander Pushkin's. From then on a number of figures associated with the arts' world were buried there, including Pushkin's contemporaries Ivan Krylov, Pyotr Vyazemsky, Pyotr Pletnyov, and Alexey Olenin. In 1844 another contemporary poet of Pushkin's, Yevgeny Baratynsky, was buried in the cemetery.

Over time the cemetery became a popular and prestigious burial ground for those of many areas of society. The wealthy merchant A.I. Kosikovsky was buried under a monumental sarcophagus on a high pedestal surmounted by a canopy on eight fluted columns. Opposite it stood a similarly grand monument to the statesman Pavel Demidov, which has since been lost. In 1857 the remains of the composer Mikhail Glinka were returned from Berlin and buried in the cemetery, with a grand monument erected two years later to the design of architect I. I. Gornostayev, with sculptures by Nikolay Laveretsky. On 1 February 1881 the author Fyodor Dostoevsky was buried in the cemetery, with a similarly large monument. During the 1880s composers Modest Mussorgsky and Alexander Borodin were buried in the northern part of the grounds, with Pyotr Ilyich Tchaikovsky following in 1891.

By the beginning of the 20th century the Tikhvin cemetery contained 1,325 monuments of various designs and sizes, including monumental crosses on pedestals, sarcophagi and steles. There were several family plots with chapels and large crypts of granite and marble.

== Soviet necropolis ==
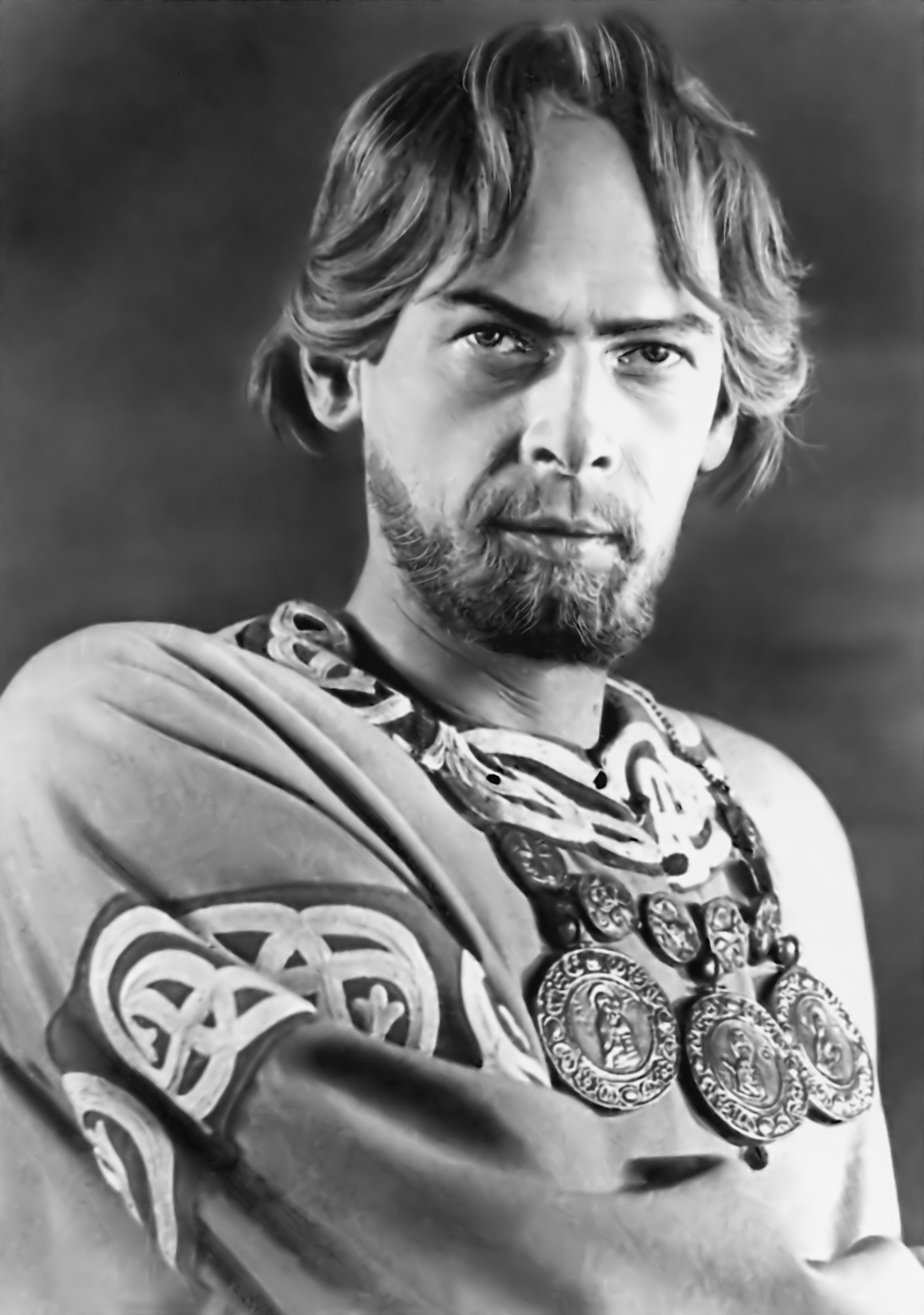
Actor Nikolay Cherkasov, one of the few people to be accorded the honour of a burial in the cemetery after the 1950s

During the early Soviet period a number of monuments were stolen or destroyed. The cemetery was officially closed for burials in 1927, though they continued until 1932, and it was decided to turn it into a necropolis museum, displaying historically and artistically significant graves. Alongside this was concept of gathering together the graves of the friends and contemporaries of Alexander Pushkin for the 1937 centenary commemorations of the poet's death. The architectural and planning department of Lensovet, the city administration, was tasked with creating a memorial park project. Plans were drawn up by architects E.N. Sandler and E.K. Reimers, with further input from the city's chief architect L.A. Ilyin. The Funeral Affair Trust was established to run the necropolis museum, including removing abandoned gravestones for sale as building materials. The reconstruction radically altered the nature and appearance of the Tikhvin cemetery. With the intention being to create an "artists' necropolis", graves of those from other sections of society were removed. Fewer than a hundred of the original monuments were preserved. Meanwhile, the remains of prominent artists, sculptors, composers and musicians were reburied in the cemetery. Among them were personal friends of Pushkin, including Konstantin Danzas, Anton Delvig, and Fyodor Matyushkin.

The organisers were faced with the problem that despite designating the cemetery to be the artists' necropolis, historically the Tikhvin had primarily been the burial ground of statesmen, military leaders, scientists, and composers. There were relatively few graves of writers, who had tended to prefer the Smolensky Cemetery; or artists, who had traditionally chosen the Nikolskoe or Novodevichy Cemetery. This necessitated the transfer of a large number of burials and monuments, which took place in two main periods, from 1936 to 1941 and from 1948 to 1952. There were also several burials of prominent Soviet citizens, as the cemetery gained the status of an urban pantheon. Those buried here included the scientist Sergey Lebedev in 1934, artist Mikhail Avilov in 1954, and actor Nikolay Cherkasov in 1966. In 1972 the remains of the composer Alexander Glazunov were transferred from Paris. In 1968 Fyodor Dostoevsky's wife Anna Dostoevskaya was reburied next to her husband, while theatre director Georgy Tovstonogov was interred in the cemetery in 1989. So far Tovstonogov's has been the last burial to take place in the cemetery.

== Military ==
Image	Name	Born	Died	Occupation	Monument	Reference
	Aleksandr Burago	1846	1883	Military officer, captain, Russo-Turkish War, Battle of Plovdiv.		
	Konstantin Danzas	1801	1870	Military officer, Major General, friend of Alexander Pushkin. Originally buried in the Vyborg Roman Catholic cemetery, transferred to the Tikhvin in 1936. Monument is not the original.		
	Fyodor Dubasov	1845	1912	Naval officer, admiral, Pacific Ocean Squadron, Moscow uprising of 1905, Governor-General of Moscow.		
	Aleksei Ignatiev	1842	1906	Military officer, general of cavalry, Governor-General of Irkutsk, of Southwestern Krai, member of the State Council.		
	Apostol Kostanda	1817	1898	Military officer, general of artillery, commander of the Moscow Military District.		
	Nikolay Leontiev	1862	1910	Military officer, Boxer Rebellion, Russo-Japanese War. Geographer and traveller, explorer of Africa, writer.		
	Yuri Lisyansky	1773	1837	Naval officer and explorer, first Russian circumnavigation of the Earth.		
	Valerian Madatov	1782	1829	Military officer, lieutenant general, Russo-Turkish War, Russo-Persian War. Monument is not original.		
	Fyodor Matyushkin	1799	1872	Naval officer, admiral, explorer, associate of Alexander Pushkin. Ferdinand von Wrangel, Russo-Turkish War, Chairman of the Naval Scientific Committee, senator. Originally buried in the Smolensky Lutheran Cemetery, transferred to the Tikhvin in 1950.		
	Alexander Mikhailovsky-Danilevsky	1789	1848	Military officer, Lieutenant General, senator, military writer, historian and author.		
	Pyotr Ricord	1776	1855	Naval officer, admiral, traveller, scientist, diplomat, writer, shipbuilder, statesman, and public figure.		
	Zinovy Rozhestvensky	1848	1909	Naval officer, admiral, Russo-Japanese War, Second Pacific Squadron, Battle of Tsushima.		
	Alexander Sablukov	1783	1857	Military officer, Lieutenant General, engineer and inventor. Centrifugal fan, centrifugal pump.		
	Alexei Senyavin	1716	1797	Naval officer, admiral, Russo-Turkish War, Admiralty Board. Originally buried in the Lazarevskoe Cemetery, transferred to the Tikhvin in 1831.		

== Scientists ==
Image	Name	Born	Died	Occupation	Monument	Reference
	Vitaly Khlopin	1890	1950	Radiochemist, professor, academician of the Soviet Academy of Sciences, Hero of Socialist Labour, and director of the Academy of Sciences's Radium Institute.		
	Sergey Lebedev	1874	1934	Chemist, inventor of polybutadiene synthetic rubber. Women's Pedagogical Institute, Saint Petersburg Academy for Military Medicine, Soviet Academy of Sciences, Order of Lenin.		
	Ivan Tarkhanov	1846	1908	Physiologist and science populariser. Head of the Department of Physiology at the Academy of Military Medicine, discovery of the skin galvanic reflex, influence of X-rays on the central nervous system, animal behavior, the heart and circulation, and embryonic development.		
	Nadezhda Ziber-Shumova	1856	1916	Biochemist, Institute of Experimental Medicine. Blood pigments and derivatives, oxidases and other enzymes, the biology of fermentation and decay, the chemical composition of bacteria, toxins and antitoxins, the pathogenicity of microorganisms.		

== Statesmen and politicians ==
Image	Name	Born	Died	Occupation	Monument	Reference
	Alexander Abaza	1821	1895	Liberal advisor of Alexander II of Russia. Minister of finance, State Comptroller, chairman of State Council's Department of the State Economy.		
	Dmitry Bludov	1785	1864	Statesman, Deputy Education Minister, Minister of Justice, Minister of the Interior, Chief of the Second Section, President of the Academy of Sciences, Chairman of the State Council. Founding member of the Arzamas Society, Ambassador to Britain.		
	Pavel Demidov	1798	1840	Statesman, noble, military officer, battle of Borodino, governor of Kursk province, founder of the Demidov Prize, State Councillor.		
	Ivan Durnovo	1835	1903	Statesman, Chairman of the Council of Ministers, Governor of Chernigov Governorate and Yekaterinoslav Governorate, Deputy Minister of Interior.		
	Pyotr Kikin	1775	1834	Statesman, military officer, general. Battle of Borodino, Battle of Lützen. Secretary of State, chairman of the Imperial Society for the Encouragement of the Arts, member of the Free Economic Society.		
	Alexey Olenin	1763	1843	Military officer, artist, archaeologist, historian and writer, director of the Imperial Public Library, president of the Imperial Academy of Arts.		
	Dmitry Sipyagin	1853	1902	Statesman, Governor of Courland and Governor of Moscow. Deputy of the Minister of State Property, Deputy of the Minister of Interior, Executive Director on the petitions of the Imperial Chancellery, Director of the Ministry of Interior, Minister of Interior.		
	Mikhail Speransky	1772	1839	Statesman, reformist, Government reform of Alexander I, Governor of Penza, and Governor-General of Siberia, codification of Russian law.		
	Pyotr Valuyev	1815	1890	Statesman, writer. Minister of State Assets, Chairman of the Council of Ministers.		
	Alexander Yakovlev	1762	1825	Chamberlain, cavalier, actual state councilor. Chief Procurator of the Most Holy Synod.		

== Architects ==
Image	Name	Born	Died	Occupation	Monument	Reference
	Vasily Stasov	1769	1848	Architect, Gruzino estate, Pushkin Lyceum, Chinese Village, Office of the Police Chief. Transfiguration and Trinity cathedrals, Moscow and Narva Gates.		

== Composers and musicians ==
Image	Name	Born	Died	Occupation	Monument	Reference
	Vasily Andreyev	1861	1918	Composer, musician, balalaika, traditional folk music and instruments. Originally buried in the Nikolskoe Cemetery, transferred to the Tikhvin in 1936.		
	Anton Arensky	1861	1906	Composer, pianist, Romantic classical music, professor of music.		
	Alexander Arkhangelsky	1846	1924	Composer, conductor, Church music. Originally buried in Prague, transferred to the Tikhvin in 1925.		
	Mily Balakirev	1837	1910	Composer, pianist, conductor. Musical nationalism, Pyotr Ilyich Tchaikovsky, Mikhail Glinka.		
	Mitrofan Belyayev	1836	1904	Music publisher, philanthropist. Founder of the Belyayev circle. Originally buried in the Novodevichy Cemetery, transferred to the Tikhvin in 1936. Monument is not original.		
	Alexander Borodin	1833	1887	Romantic composer, "The Mighty Handful", In the Steppes of Central Asia, Prince Igor. Noted chemist, organic synthesis, nucleophilic substitution, co-discoverer of the aldol reaction.		
	Dmitry Bortniansky	1751	1825	Composer, harpsichordist and conductor. Liturgical works and choral concertos. Originally buried in the Smolensky Cemetery, transferred to the Tikhvin in 1939. Monument is not original.		
	Angiolina Bosio	1830	1859	Operatic soprano, works of Giuseppe Verdi. Originally buried in the Vyborg Roman Catholic cemetery, transferred to the Tikhvin in 1939.		
	Catterino Cavos	1775	1840	Operatic composer, organist and conductor, father of Alberto Cavos. Opera Ivan Susanin. Originally buried in the Volkovo Cemetery, transferred to the Tikhvin in 1936.		
	César Cui	1835	1918	Composer and music critic, member of the Belyayev circle and The Five. Army officer, Engineer-General, fortifications. Originally buried in the Smolensky Lutheran Cemetery, transferred to the Tikhvin in 1936.		
	Alexander Dargomyzhsky	1813	1869	Composer, operas Esmeralda, Rusalka, The Stone Guest. Original monument destroyed in a hurricane in 1955. New monument installed in 1961.		
	Alexander Glazunov	1865	1936	Composer, music teacher, conductor of the late Russian Romantic period. Director of the Saint Petersburg Conservatory. Originally buried in France, monument installed in 1951. Reburied in the Tikhvin in 1972, monument transferred in 1975.		
	Mikhail Glinka	1804	1857	Composer, Ruslan and Lyudmila. Initially buried in Berlin.		
	Herman Laroche	1835	1904	Composer, music critic, Saint Petersburg Conservatory, professor of music history and theory at the Moscow Conservatory. Monument is not original.		
	Grigory Lishin	1854	1888	Composer, poet, theatre critic. Operas Graf Nulin and Tsigane. Monument is not original.		
	Anatoly Lyadov	1855	1914	Composer, teacher and conductor. Originally buried at the Novodevichy Cemetery, transferred to the Tikhvin in 1936. Monument is not original.		
	Ivan Melnikov	1832	1906	Baritone opera singer. Mariinsky Theatre, operas of Pyotr Ilyich Tchaikovsky. Originally buried at the Novodevichy Cemetery, transferred to the Tikhvin in 1936.		
	Modest Mussorgsky	1839	1881	Composer, one of "The Five". Opera Boris Godunov, Night on Bald Mountain, Pictures at an Exhibition.		
	Osip Petrov	1806	1878	Operatic bass-baritone, Mariinsky Theatre. Originally buried at the Smolensky Cemetery, transferred to the Tikhvin in 1936.		
	Nikolai Rimsky-Korsakov	1844	1908	Composer, member of The Five. Capriccio Espagnol, Russian Easter Festival Overture, Scheherazade. Originally buried in the Novodevichy Cemetery, transferred to the Tikhvin in 1936.		
	Nadezhda Rimskaya-Korsakova	1848	1919	Pianist and composer, wife of Nikolai Rimsky-Korsakov.		
	Anton Rubinstein	1829	1894	Pianist, composer and conductor. Founded the Saint Petersburg Conservatory. Originally buried in the Nikolskoe Cemetery, transferred to the Tikhvin in 1939. Monument is not original.		
	Alexander Serov	1820	1871	Composer and music critic. Operas Judith and Rogneda.		
	Nikolay Sokolov	1859	1922	Composer, teacher, Saint Petersburg Conservatory. Originally buried in the Novodevichy Cemetery, transferred to the Tikhvin in 1936.		
	Pyotr Tchaikovsky	1840	1893	Composer. Swan Lake, Eugene Onegin, The Queen of Spades, The Seasons.		
	Aleksandr Verzhbilovich	1850	1911	Classical cellist. Saint Petersburg Conservatory, Russian Imperial Opera Orchestra, Saint Petersburg String Quartet. Monument is not original.		
	Alexandre Villoing	1804	1878	Pianist and music teacher. Saint Petersburg Conservatory.		
	Anna Yesipova	1851	1914	Pianist. Royal Prussian Court Pianist, Professor at the Saint Petersburg Conservatory. Originally buried in the Nikolskoe Cemetery, transferred to the Tikhvin in 1948. Monument is not original.		

== Actors, actresses and dancers ==
Image	Name	Born	Died	Occupation	Monument	Reference
	Varvara Asenkova	1817	1841	Stage actress, Imperial Theatres. Originally buried in the Smolensky Cemetery, transferred to the Tikhvin in 1936. Monument bust destroyed by bomb in 1943 during the siege of Leningrad. Replaced with a copy in 1955.		
	Nikolay Cherkasov	1903	1966	Actor, People's Artist of the USSR. Mariinsky Theatre, Bolshoi Theatre, Young Spectator's Theatre. Films of Sergei Eisenstein, Alexander Nevsky, Ivan the Terrible, Stalin Prize.		
	Ivan Dmitrevsky	1734	1821	Actor, Russian Neoclassicism, tragedian. Plays of Alexander Sumarokov, Russian Academy. Originally buried in the Volkovsky Orthodox cemetery, transferred to the Tikhvin in 1939. Monument is not original.		
	Pyotr Karatygin	1805	1879	Actor, playwright. Woe from Wit, head of Drama department in Theatre College. Originally buried in the Smolensky Cemetery, transferred to the Tikhvin in 1936.		
	Vasily Karatygin	1802	1853	Actor, Russian Romanticism. Bolshoi Theatre, Alexandrinsky Theatre. Originally buried in the Smolensky Cemetery, transferred to the Tikhvin in 1936.		
	Alexandra Kolosova	1802	1880	Stage actress, translator and memoirist.		
	Eugenia Kolosova	1780	1869	Ballerina, Imperial Theatres. Originally buried in the Smolensky Cemetery, transferred to the Tikhvin in 1936. Monument is not original.		
	Vera Komissarzhevskaya	1864	1910	Actress and theatre manager. Alexandrinsky Theatre. Originally buried in the Nikolskoe Cemetery, transferred to the Tikhvin in 1936.		
	Vera Michurina-Samoilova	1866	1948	Actress, People's Artist of the USSR. Alexandrinsky Theatre. Light Without Heat, A Month in the Country, The Cherry Orchard, Intrigue and Love. USSR State Prize, Order of Lenin.		
	Marius Petipa	1818	1910	Ballet dancer, pedagogue and choreographer. Imperial Ballet. The Pharaoh's Daughter, Le Réveil de Flore, Raymonda. Originally buried in the Volkovo Cemetery, transferred to the Tikhvin in 1948, monument installed in 1988.		
	Modest Pisarev	1844	1905	Stage actor, reader in drama and theatre critic. Korsh Theatre, Alexandrinsky Theatre.		
	Vasily Samoylov	1813	1887	Stage actor, opera singer, Alexandrinsky Theatre. Originally buried in the Novodevichy Cemetery, transferred to the Tikhvin in 1936.		
	Nikolai Sazonov	1843	1902	Stage actor, opera singer, Alexandrinsky Theatre. Originally buried in the Nikolskoe Cemetery, transferred to the Tikhvin in 1936.		
	Ekaterina Semenova	1786	1849	Actress. Originally buried in the Mitrofanyevsky Cemetery, transferred to the Tikhvin in 1936. Monument is not original.		
	Nymphodora Semenova	1787	1876	Opera singer, Imperial Theatres. Originally buried in the Novodevichy Cemetery, transferred to the Tikhvin in 1936. Monument is not original.		
	Fyodor Stravinsky	1843	1902	Bass opera singer and actor, father of Igor Stravinsky. Originally buried in the Novodevichy Cemetery, transferred to the Tikhvin in 1936.		
	Polina Strepetova	1850	1903	Stage actress, tragic roles. Originally buried in the Nikolskoe Cemetery, transferred to the Tikhvin in 1936. Monument is not original.		
	Georgy Tovstonogov	1915	1989	Theatre director, Tovstonogov Bolshoi Drama Theater, People's Artist of the USSR. Three Stalin Prizes, two Orders of Lenin, The Profession of the Stage-Director.		
	Ivan Yershov	1867	1943	Opera singer, tenor, Mariinsky Theatre. Originally buried in Tashkent, transferred to the Tikhvin in 1956.		

== Artists and painters ==
Image	Name	Born	Died	Occupation	Monument	Reference
	Mikhail Avilov	1882	1954	Painter, member of the Leningrad Union of Soviet Artists, professor of the Repin Institute of Arts, Stalin Prize, People's Artist of the RSFSR, Leningrad School of Painting.		
	Alexey Bogolyubov	1824	1896	Landscape painter, Imperial Academy of Arts. Originally buried in the Malokhtinsky Cemetery, transferred to the Tikhvin prior to 1941.		
	Fyodor Bruni	1799	1875	Artist and painter, Imperial Academy of Arts, Accademia di Belle Arti di Firenze, Accademia di San Luca. Originally buried in the Vyborg Roman Catholic Cemetery, transferred to the Tikhvin in 1936.		
	Vasily Demut-Malinovsky	1779	1846	Sculptor, Empire style, Imperial Academy of Arts Kazan Cathedral, Alexander Column, General Staff Building, Bourse, Admiralty, Mining Institute, Narva Gate, Mikhailovsky Palace. Originally buried in the Smolensky Cemetery, transferred to the Tikhvin in 1940.		
	Pavel Fedotov	1815	1852	Amateur painter, the "Russian Hogarth". Originally buried in the Smolensky Cemetery, transferred to the Tikhvin in 1939. Monument is not original.		
	Konstantin Flavitsky	1830	1866	Painter, Imperial Academy of Arts. Originally buried in the Smolensky Cemetery, transferred to the Tikhvin in 1936. Monument is not original.		
	Alexander Ivanov	1806	1858	Painter, neoclassicism, The Appearance of Christ Before the People. Originally buried in the Novodevichy Cemetery, transferred to the Tikhvin in 1940.		
	Peter Clodt von Jürgensburg	1805	1867	Sculptor, Horse Tamers on the Anichkov Bridge, statuary of the Narva Triumphal Gate, quadriga above the portico of the Bolshoi Theatre, Monument to Nicholas I. Originally buried in the Smolensky Lutheran Cemetery, transferred to the Tikhvin in 1936. Monument is not original, and dates from the 1840s.		
	Alexei Korzukhin	1835	1894	Genre painter, Imperial Academy of Fine Arts, Realism, Peredvizhniki, Artel of Artists, teacher at the Imperial Society for the Encouragement of the Arts. Originally buried in the Nikolskoe Cemetery, transferred to the Tikhvin in 1940. Monument is not original.		
	Ivan Kramskoi	1837	1887	Painter and art critic, Peredvizhniki, Artel of Artists, Christ in the Desert. Originally buried in the Smolensky Cemetery, transferred to the Tikhvin in 1939. Monument is not original.		
	Arkhip Kuindzhi	1842	1910	Landscape painter, realist, Peredvizhniki, Imperial Academy of Arts. Originally buried in the Smolensky Cemetery, transferred to the Tikhvin in 1952.		
	Boris Kustodiev	1878	1927	Painter and stage designer, Imperial Academy of Arts. The Beauty, Portrait of Chaliapin.		
	Boris Orlovsky	1796	1837	Neoclassical sculptor. Statues of Kutuzov and Barclay de Tolly at the Kazan Cathedral, angel on the Alexander Column. Originally buried in the Smolensky Cemetery, transferred to the Tikhvin in 1936.		
	Anna Ostroumova-Lebedeva	1871	1955	Artist, watercolor painting. Pioneer of the woodcut technique. Mir iskusstva.		
	Stepan Pimenov	1784	1833	Sculptor, Imperial Academy of Arts, Kazan Cathedral, Imperial Porcelain Factory, Mining Institute, Admiralty building, General Staff Building. Originally buried in the Smolensky Cemetery, transferred to the Tikhvin in 1936, monument erected in 1939.		
	Nikolai Pimenov	1812	1864	Sculptor, Imperial Academy of Arts, Saint Isaac's Cathedral. Originally buried in the Smolensky Cemetery, transferred to the Tikhvin in 1936, monument erected in 1939.		
	Pavel Pleshanov	1829	1882	Portrait and history painter. Member of the Imperial Academy of Arts.		
	Luigi Premazzi	1814	1891	Painter, mainly of watercolor vedute. Originally buried in the Vyborg Roman Catholic Cemetery, transferred to the Tikhvin in 1940.		
	Ivan Shishkin	1832	1898	Landscape painter, Moscow School of Painting, Sculpture and Architecture, Imperial Academy of Arts. Peredvizhniki, Morning in a Pine Forest. Originally buried in the Smolensky Cemetery, transferred to the Tikhvin in 1950.		
	Nikolai Utkin	1780	1863	Graphic artist, engraver and illustrator, curator of prints at the Hermitag, superintendent of the museum at the Imperial Academy of Arts. Originally buried in the Smolensky Cemetery, transferred to the Tikhvin in 1936.		
	Alexander Varnek	1782	1843	Portrait painter, professor and advisor at the Imperial Academy of Arts. Originally buried in the Smolensky Lutheran Cemetery, transferred to the Tikhvin in 1936. Monument is not original.		
	Ivan Vitali	1794	1855	Sculptor, Imperial Academy of Arts. Statues for Triumphal Arch of Moscow, fountain of the Bolshoi Theatre, bas-reliefs above the doors of Saint Isaac's Cathedral, outdoor bronze statue of Emperor Paul in Gatchina. Originally buried in the Volkovo Cemetery, transferred to the Tikhvin in 1936.		
	Maksim Vorobyov	1787	1855	Landscape painter. Originally buried in the Smolensky Cemetery, transferred to the Tikhvin in 1936.		
	Alexei Yegorov	c. 1776	1851	Painter, draftsman and professor of history painting. Originally buried in the Smolensky Cemetery, transferred to the Tikhvin in 1936. Monument is not original.		

== Writers and poets ==
Image	Name	Born	Died	Occupation	Monument	Reference
	Yevgeny Baratynsky	1800	1844	Elegiac poet. Symbolism.		
	Anton Delvig	1798	1831	Poet, journalist, friend of Alexander Pushkin. Neoclassicism, Russian folk songs. Editor of Northern Flowers and Literaturnaya Gazeta. Originally buried in the Volkovo Cemetery, transferred to the Tikhvin in 1934.		
	Fyodor Dostoevsky	1821	1881	Novelist, short story writer, essayist, journalist and philosopher. Crime and Punishment, The Idiot, The Brothers Karamazov, Notes from Underground.		
	Anna Dostoevskaya	1846	1918	Memoirist, philatelist, stenographer, assistant, and the second wife of Fyodor Dostoevsky. Anna Dostoyevskaya's Diary, Memoirs of Anna Dostoyevskaya.		
	Nikolay Gnedich	1784	1833	Poet and translator, The Fishers, translation of the Iliad.		
	Ivan Gorbunov	1831	1896	Writer and stage actor, forefather of Russian "literary theatre", Maly Theatre, Alexandrinsky Theatre, Scenes from the People's Life, theatre historian. Originally buried in the Nikolskoe Cemetery, transferred to the Tikhvin in 1936. Monument is from 1951.		
	Alexander Izmaylov	1779	1831	Fabulist, poet, novelist, publisher, pedagogue, vice-governor of Tver and Arkhangelsk Governorates. Russian Enlightenment. Originally buried in the Smolensky Cemetery, transferred to the Tikhvin in 1936. Monument is not original, but typical of the 1830s.		
	Nikolay Karamzin	1766	1826	Writer, poet, historian and critic. History of the Russian State.		
	Evtikhy Karpov	1857	1926	Playwright and theatre director. Early Autumn, Alexandrinsky Theatre, Griboyedov Prize, Meritorious Theatre Director of the Republic. Originally buried in the Nikolskoe Cemetery, transferred to the Tikhvin in 1936. Monument is not original.		
	Ivan Kozlov	1779	1840	Romantic poet and translator.		
	Ivan Krylov	1769	1844	Fabulist, dramatist and journalist.		
	Elisabeth Kulmann	1808	1825	Poet and translator. Originally buried in the Smolensky Cemetery, transferred to the Tikhvin in the 1930s.		
	Pyotr Pletnyov	1792	1866	Poet and literary critic, dean of Saint Petersburg University, academician of Petersburg Academy of Sciences, friend of Alexander Pushkin, editor of Sovremennik. Monument is not original.		
	Nikolay Shcherbina	1821	1869	Poet, Grecheskie stikhotvoreniya.		
	Dmitry Stasov	1828	1918	Lawyer, legal writer, Chief Secretary of the Civil Department of the Senate.		
	Vladimir Stasov	1824	1906	Critic, Imperial Academy of Arts, honorary fellow of the Russian Academy of Sciences.		
	Pyotr Vyazemsky	1792	1878	Poet, Golden Age of Russian Poetry, Romanticism. Friend of Alexander Pushkin. Monument is not original.		
	Vasily Zhukovsky	1783	1852	Poet, writer, translator, Arzamas Society, friend of Alexander Pushkin.		

== Educators ==
Nadezhda Stasova	1822	1895	Early feminist, educator, organizer of the Bestuzhev Courses for women

== Nobility ==
Ekaterina Ribeaupierre	1788	1872	State Lady, Order of Saint Catherine, salons.

== Formerly buried in the Tikhvin Cememtery ==
Aleksandr Gradovsky	1841	1889	Jurist, professor of law at Saint Petersburg University, leading theorist of Russian administrative and constitutional law, one of the drafters of the Tarnovo Constitution. Originally buried in the Tikhvin Cemetery, transferred to the Literary Walk of the Volkovo Cemetery in the 1930s.
Anatoly Koni	1844	1927	Jurist, judge, politician and writer. State Council, academic of Petrograd University. Originally buried in the Tikhvin Cemetery, transferred to the Literary Walk of the Volkovo Cemetery in 1930.
Viktor Pashutin	1845	1901	Pathophysiologist, one of the founders of the pathophysiologic school in Russia and of pathophysiology as an independent scientific discipline. Head of the Imperial Military Medical Academy. Originally buried in the Tikhvin Cemetery, transferred to the Literary Walk of the Volkovo Cemetery in 1936.
