= Tikhvin Cemetery =

Cemetery in St. Petersburg, Russia

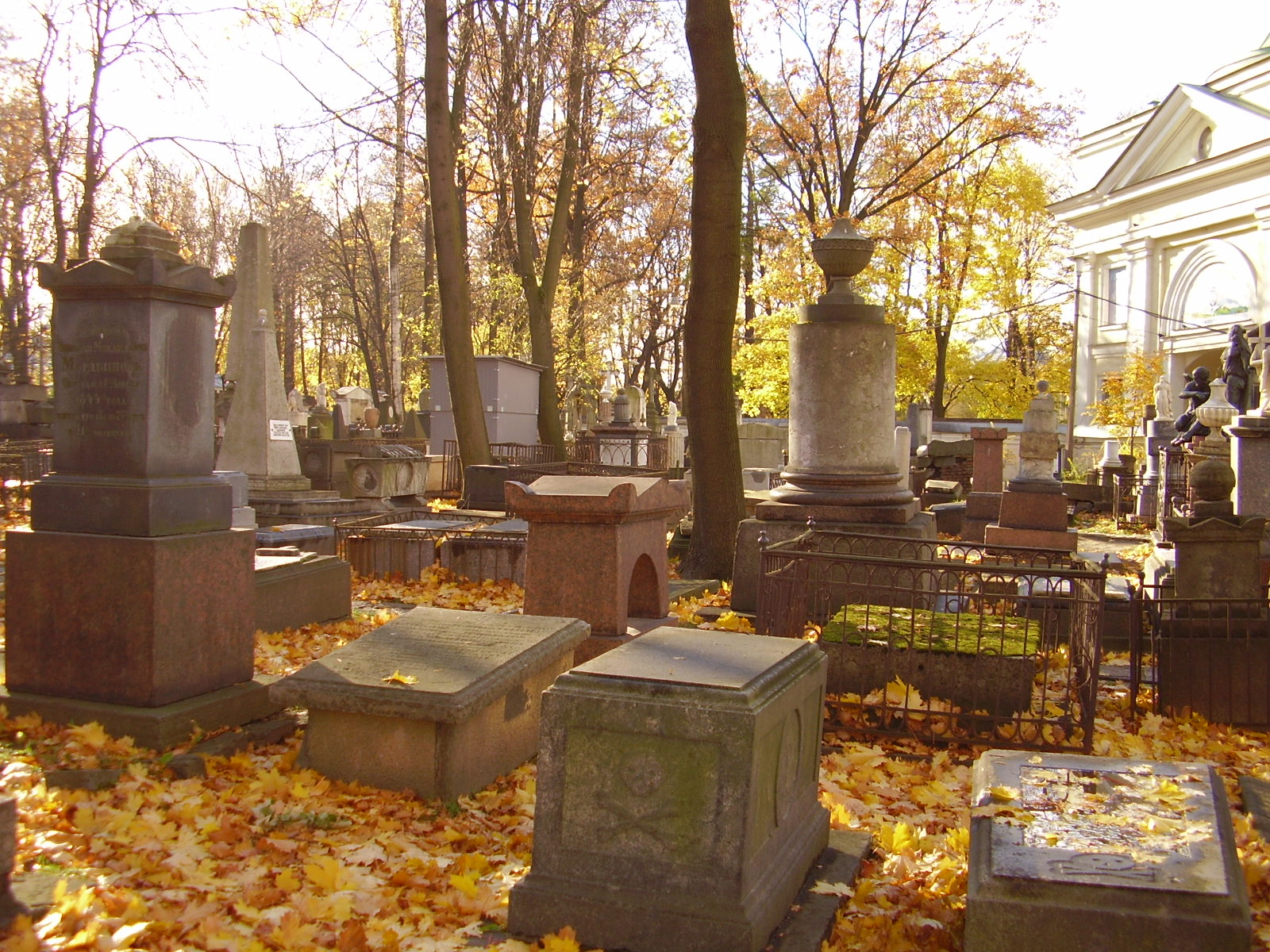
- Interactive map of Tikhvin Cemetery

Details
- Established: 1823
- Location: Saint Petersburg
- Country: Russia
- Coordinates: 59°55′22″N 30°23′10″E

Tikhvin Cemetery (Russian: Тихвинское кладбище) is a historic cemetery in the centre of Saint Petersburg. It is part of the Alexander Nevsky Lavra, and is one of four cemeteries in the complex. Since 1932 it has been part of the State Museum of Urban Sculpture, which refers to it as the Necropolis of the Masters of Art (Russian: Некрополь мастеров искусств).

Opened in 1823 after the monastery's first cemetery, the Lazarevskoe, had become overcrowded, the cemetery was initially called the "New Lazarevsky". It acquired its name after the building of its cemetery church, consecrated to the icon of the Tikhvin Mother of God. It soon superseded the Lazarevskoe Cemetery and became a popular and prestigious burial ground. The first literary figure, Nikolay Karamzin, was buried in the cemetery in 1826, followed in 1833 by Nikolay Gnedich, an associate of Alexander Pushkin. Several other friends of Pushkin were later buried in the cemetery. Particularly significant interments were those of Mikhail Glinka in 1857, Fyodor Dostoevsky in 1881, Modest Mussorgsky and Alexander Borodin in the 1880s, and Pyotr Ilyich Tchaikovsky in 1893.

During the Soviet period the cemetery was earmarked for development into a museum necropolis, envisaged primarily as a landscaped park, with strategically placed memorials to important figures of Russian history. With several notable artists having already been buried in the cemetery, it was decided to designate it as the "Necropolis of the Masters of Art". During the 1930s many important Russian composers, painters, sculptors, writers and poets were exhumed from their original resting places across the city, and brought, with or without their monuments, to be reburied in the Tikhvin cemetery. At the same time the monuments of those figures deemed not in keeping with the artistic theme of the cemetery were removed or destroyed. Several more burials of particularly important artists took place during the Soviet period, as the cemetery established a role as a kind of national pantheon.

== Establishment ==
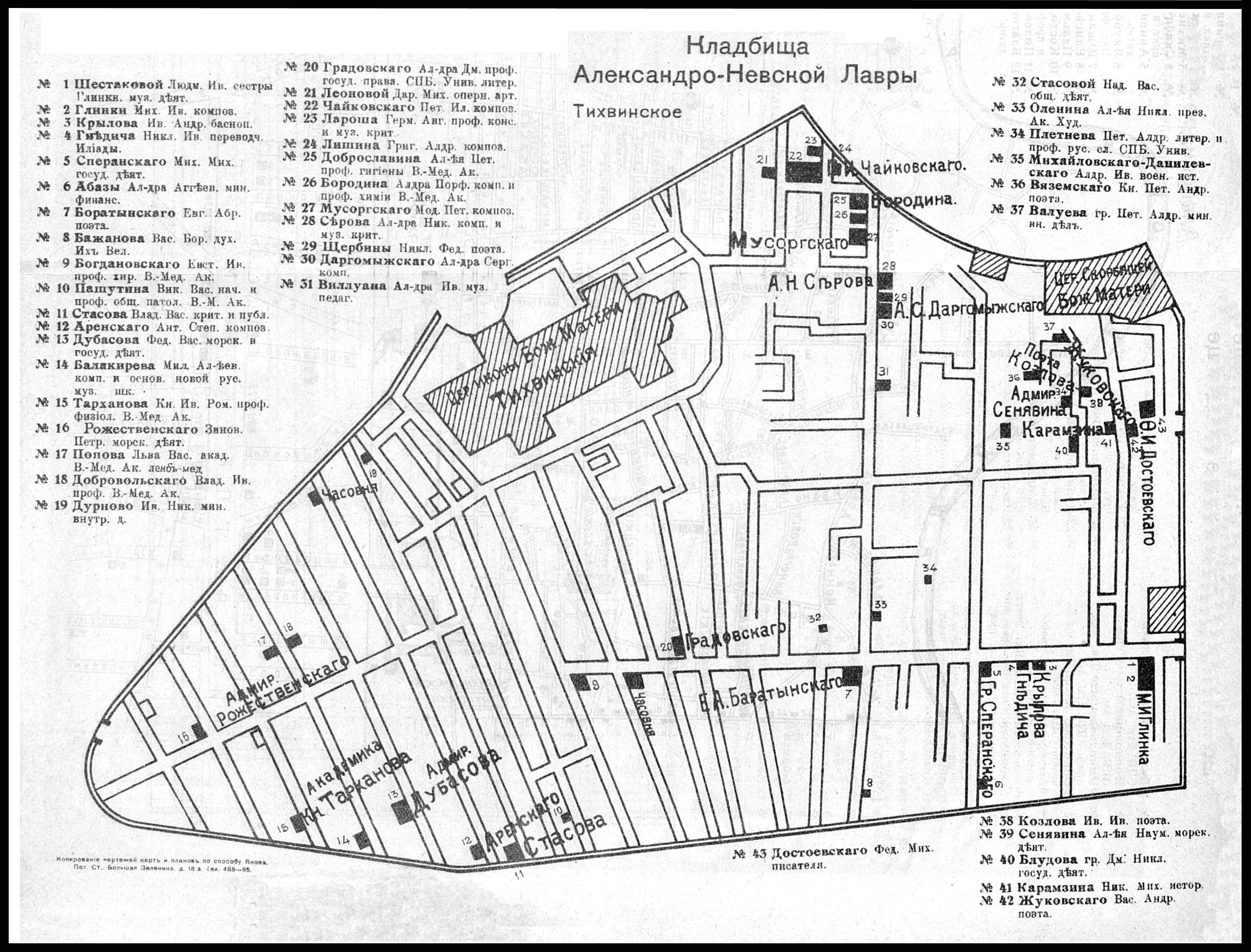
The plan of the cemetery as it was in 1914

The cemetery is located close to Alexander Nevsky Square, to the right of the pathway leading from the Gate Church to the River Monastyrka. This land had previously been occupied with ornamental and vegetable gardens. The first cemetery in the monastery, the Lazarevskoe Cemetery, had been established in 1717, and by the early nineteenth century was becoming overcrowded. In March 1823 the monastery authorities proposed the creation of a new burial ground opposite the St. Petersburg Theological Consistory. The new cemetery, initially called the "New Lazarevsky" (Russian: Ново-Лазаревским), was established in the eastern part of the plot of land, between the pathway to the monastery, and the consistory building, enclosed with a wooden fence. Over time it expanded to the west, into the areas formerly occupied by monastic gardens, and in the 1870s it was enclosed with a stone wall.

== Cemetery church ==
The brothers D. M. and N. M. Polezhaev, wealthy merchants, funded the construction of a cemetery church, laid down on 26 September 1869 and built to the design of architect N. P. Grebyonki. The church was consecrated on 2 February 1873 in the name of the icon of the Tikhvin Mother of God, which from about 1876 became the common name of the cemetery. Two icons, one of Saint Dimitry of Rostov, and one of Saint Mary of Egypt, were painted by Pavel Pleshanov for the church. In 1825 the church and cemetery were visited by Emperor Alexander I, prior to his journey to Taganrog.

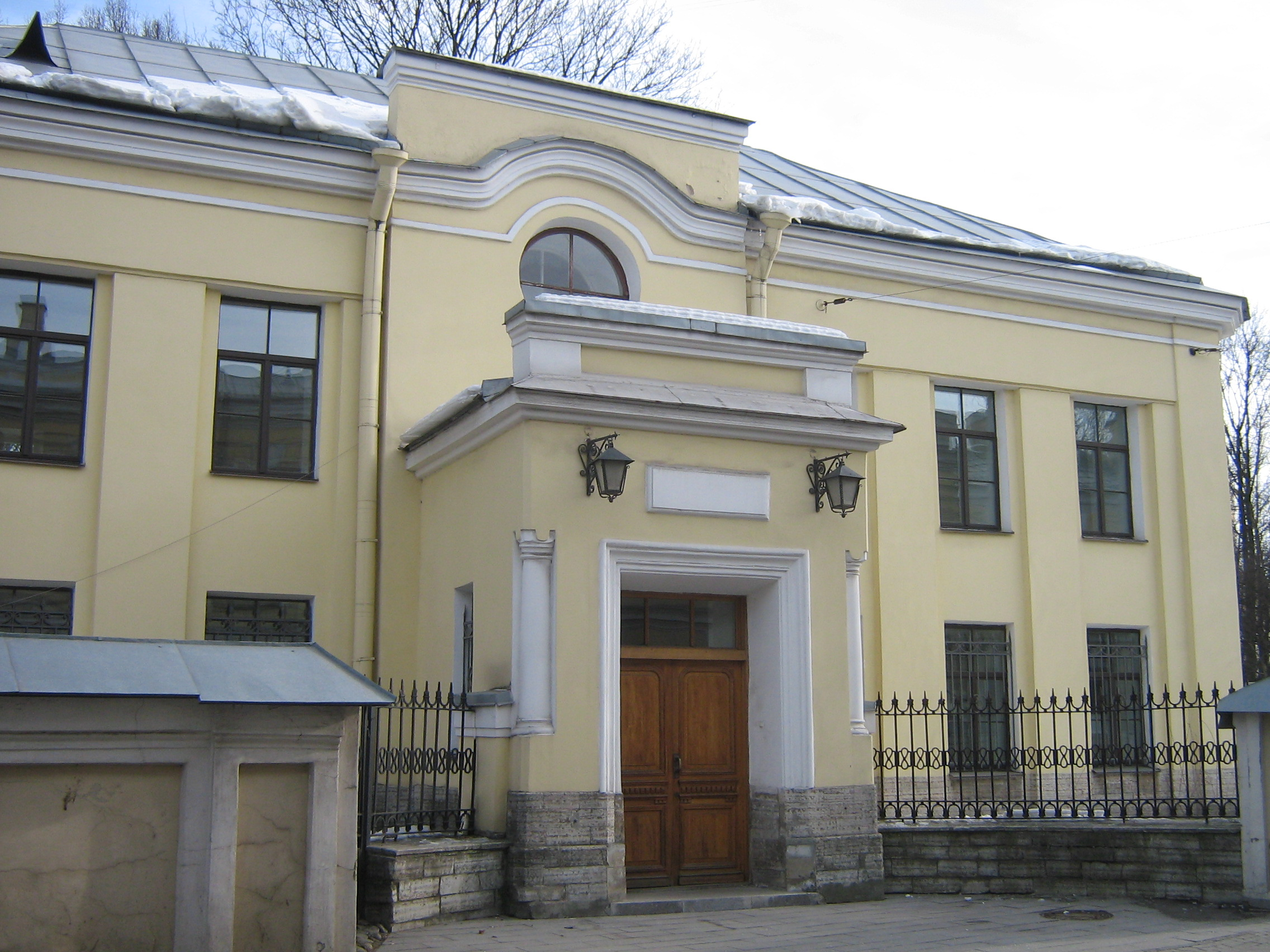
The former cemetery church

The burial vault of Polezhaev family was in the crypt of the church, and in 1901 the church underwent renovations. In 1918 archpriest Peter Skipetrov of the Gate Church, who had been shot and killed during an early attempt by the Bolsheviks to requisition the monastery on 19 January 1918, was buried under the church's altar. The church was closed in 1931 and between 1935 and 1937 it was converted into a post office, with the destruction of its facades and interiors. With the establishment of the State Museum of Urban Sculpture, the building housed its scientific department, and now houses an exhibition hall as part of the museum.

== Burials ==
The rate of burials in the Old and New Lazarevskoe cemeteries was about equal during the early years of the latter's existence, though by the 1830s the New Lazarevskoe Cemetery became more popular. Burials initially took place in the eastern part of the cemetery, and in 1825 the holy fool monk Patermufy was buried there. In 1826 the writer Nikolay Karamzin was buried in the cemetery, followed in 1833 by Nikolay Gnedich, a contemporary of Pushkin's. Gnedich's funeral on 6 February 1833 was attended by many prominent literary figures, including Pushkin, Ivan Krylov, Pyotr Vyazemsky, Pyotr Pletnyov, Fyodor Tolstoy and Alexey Olenin. With the exception of Pushkin, all would eventually be buried in the Lavra's cemeteries; Krylov, Vyazemsky, Pletnyov and Olenin in the Tikhvin, and Tolstoy in the Lazarevskoe. In 1844 another contemporary poet of Pushkin's, Yevgeny Baratynsky, was buried in the cemetery.

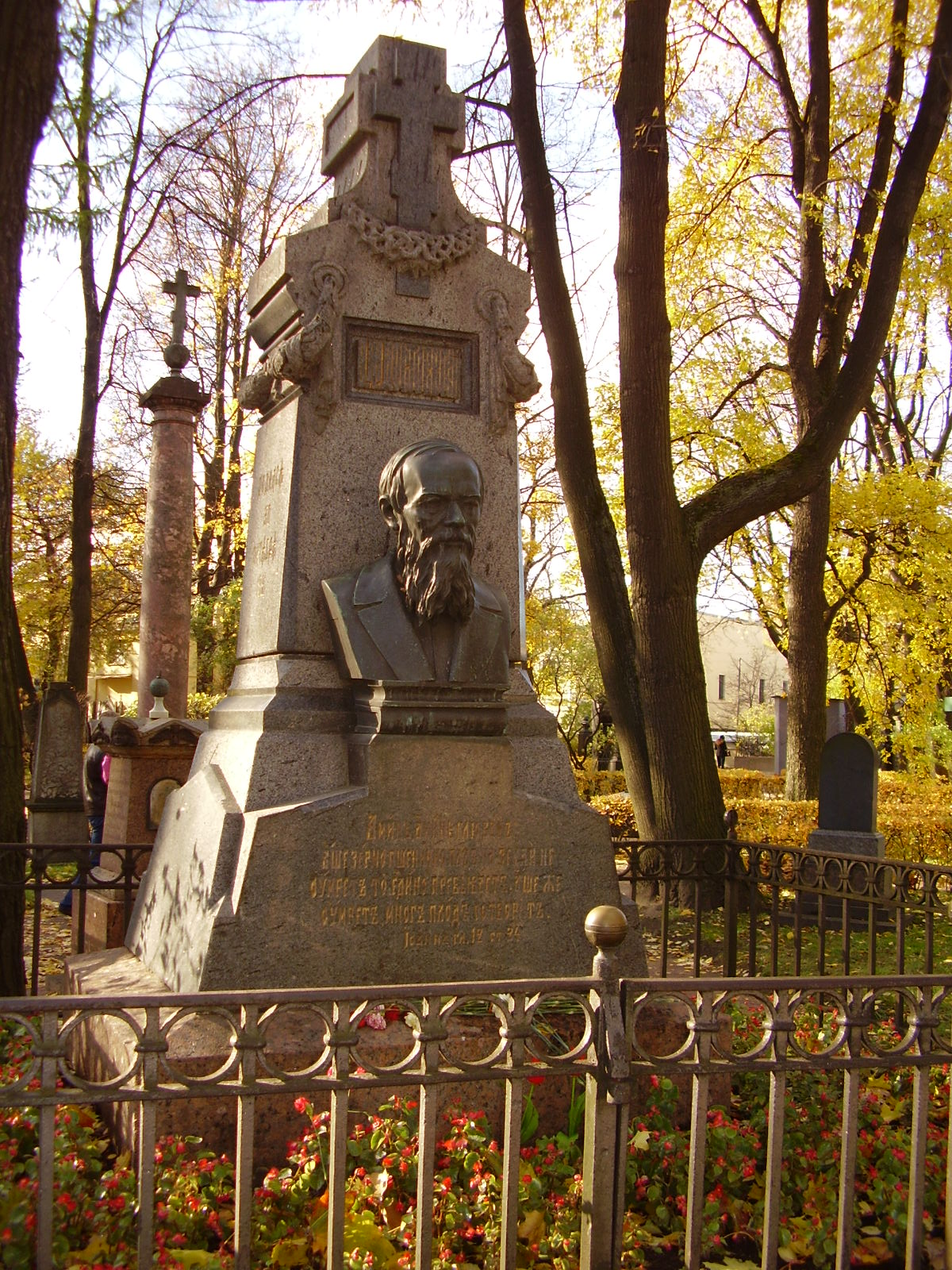
The grave of Fyodor Dostoevsky and his wife Anna

The cemetery became a popular and prestigious burial ground for those of many areas of society. The wealthy merchant A.I. Kosikovsky was buried under a monumental sarcophagus on a high pedestal surmounted by a canopy on eight fluted columns. Opposite it stood a similarly grand monument to the statesman Pavel Demidov, which has since been lost. In 1857 the remains of the composer Mikhail Glinka were returned from Berlin and buried in the cemetery, with a grand monument erected two years later to the design of architect I. I. Gornostayev, with sculptures by Nikolay Laveretsky. On 1 February 1881 the author Fyodor Dostoevsky was buried in the cemetery, with a similarly large monument. During the 1880s composers Modest Mussorgsky and Alexander Borodin were buried in the northern part of the grounds, with Pyotr Ilyich Tchaikovsky following in 1893. Eventually all the members of the group of composers termed "The Five", or the "Mighty Handful"; Mussorgsky, Borodin, as well as Mily Balakirev, César Cui and Nikolai Rimsky-Korsakov, were buried in the cemetery.

By the beginning of the 20th century the Tikhvin cemetery contained 1,325 monuments of various designs and sizes, including monumental crosses on pedestals, sarcophagi and steles. There were several family plots with chapels and large crypts of granite and marble.

== Soviet necropolis ==
During the early Soviet period a number of monuments were stolen or destroyed. The cemetery was officially closed for burials in 1927, though they continued until 1932, and it was decided to turn it into a necropolis museum, displaying historically and artistically significant graves. Alongside this was concept of gathering together the graves of the friends and contemporaries of Alexander Pushkin for the 1937 centenary commemorations of the poet's death. The architectural and planning department of Lensovet, the city administration, was tasked with creating a memorial park project. Plans were drawn up by architects E.N. Sandler and E.K. Reimers, with further input from the city's chief architect L.A. Ilyin. The Funeral Affair Trust was established to run the necropolis museum, including removing abandoned gravestones for sale as building materials.

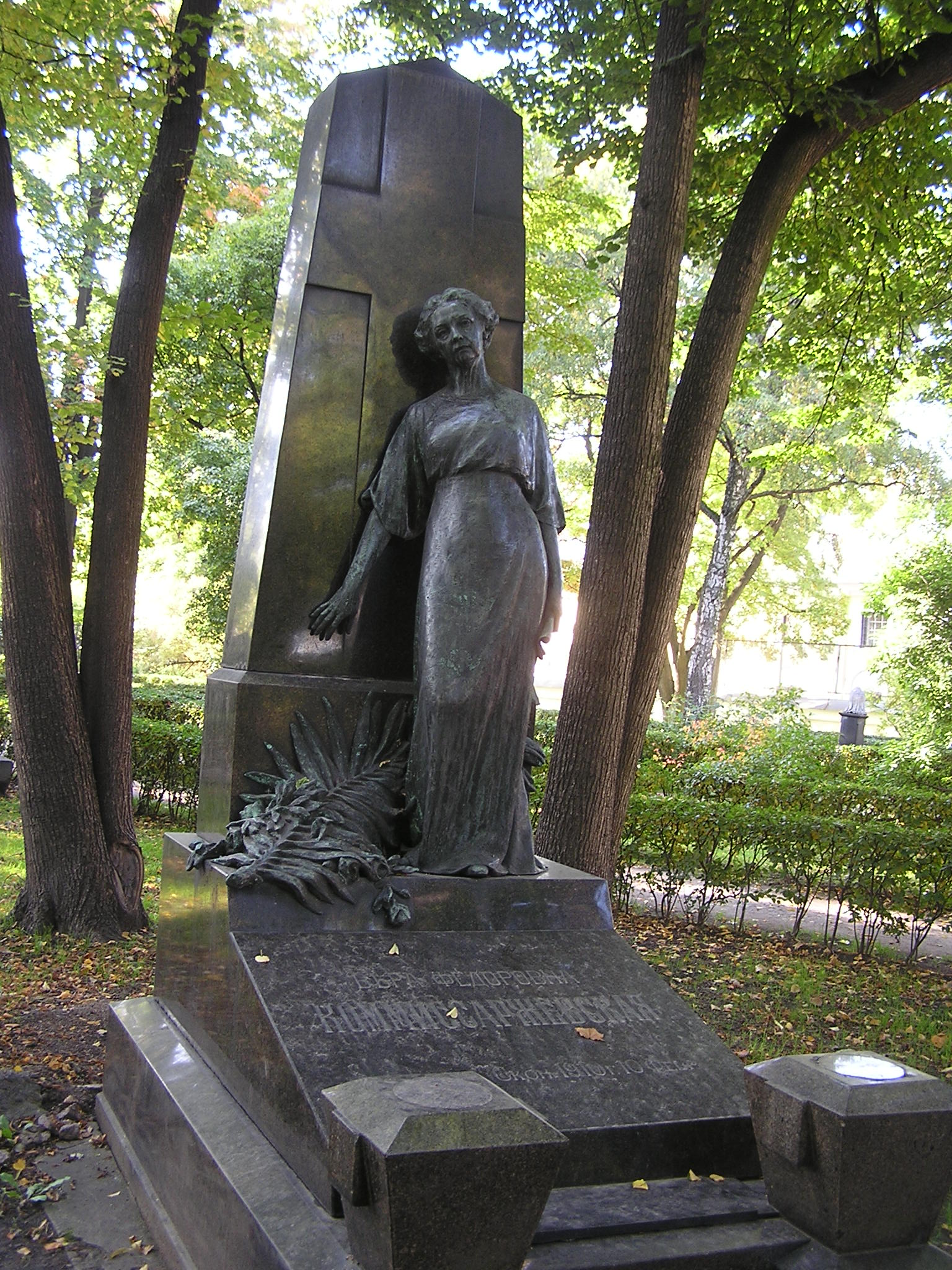
The grave of Vera Komissarzhevskaya, one of many transferred to the Tikhvin Cemetery in the 1930s

The Funeral Affair Trust was authorised to acquire and transfer important graves and monuments from other cemeteries and churches across the city. Meanwhile, those existing graves in the cemetery that were not considered particularly artistic or historic were to be demolished to create space for those brought from other locations. A list of graves in the cemetery was compiled and work began in 1935, planned for completion on 15 August the following year. A 3 July 1935 resolution from the Presidium of Lensovet set out the vision for the future of the necropolis museums.

the Tikhvin cemetery and the Literary Walk [in the Volkovo Cemetery] ... after the reconstruction will be turned into necropolis parks of a remarkable and revolutionary culture, with the appearance of parks. Freed from ordinary graves, they will not be of a graveyard nature at all, but will actually represent extensive, architecturally decorated green spaces, sometimes decorated with certain monuments standing on the graves above these wonderful people.

The short timeframe allowed for completion of the work led to the hasty and unsystematic demolition of a number of monuments, with the bulk of the work only being completed by August 1937, with remedial work continuing for many years afterwards.

The reconstruction radically altered the nature and appearance of the Tikhvin cemetery. With the intention being to create an "artists' necropolis", graves of those from other sections of society were removed. Fewer than a hundred of the original monuments were preserved. Some were transferred to the neighbouring "Necropolis of the XVIII century", the former Lazarevskoe Cemetery, while others, including those of Aleksandr Gradovsky, Anatoly Koni and Viktor Pashutin, were transferred to the other museum necropolis being established in the Volkov Cemetery. Meanwhile, the remains of prominent artists, sculptors, composers and musicians were reburied in the cemetery. Among them were personal friends of Pushkin, including Konstantin Danzas, Anton Delvig, and Fyodor Matyushkin. Some remains came from cemeteries earmarked for demolition, such as the Mitrofanievskoe, Farforovskoe, and Vyborg Roman Catholic Cemetery; and others from those that were intended to be kept open, such as the Smolensky, Volkovo, Novodevichy, and Nikolskoe cemeteries. The necropolis was created during an ongoing anti-religious campaign, therefore monuments with religious symbols were often replaced by monuments made by the museum.

The cemetery reconstruction project concentrated the representatives of each type of art together, with even monuments that had been in the Tikhvin originally being moved to fit the new organisational scheme. Composers and musicians were reburied mainly on the "Composer's path", near the northern boundary of the cemetery. Painters and sculptors were placed in the western part, while those who in their lifetimes had been associated with Pushkin were placed close to the eastern section, near the cemetery entrance. Some of the older monuments from the removed graves were retained to serve as decorative ornaments, such as columns placed at the intersection of avenues. The decoration of the park-necropolis was to be enhanced by the construction of one large and four small fountains, and the installation of granite benches. The Tikhvin Church was slated for demolition to improve the access direct from Alexander Nevsky Square. The organisers were faced with the problem that despite designating the cemetery to be the artists' necropolis, historically the Tikhvin had primarily been the burial ground of statesmen, military leaders, scientists, and composers. There were relatively few graves of writers, who had tended to prefer the Smolensky Cemetery; or artists, who had traditionally chosen the Nikolskoe or Novodevichy Cemetery. This necessitated the transfer of a large number of burials and monuments, which took place in two main periods, from 1936 to 1941 and from 1948 to 1952.

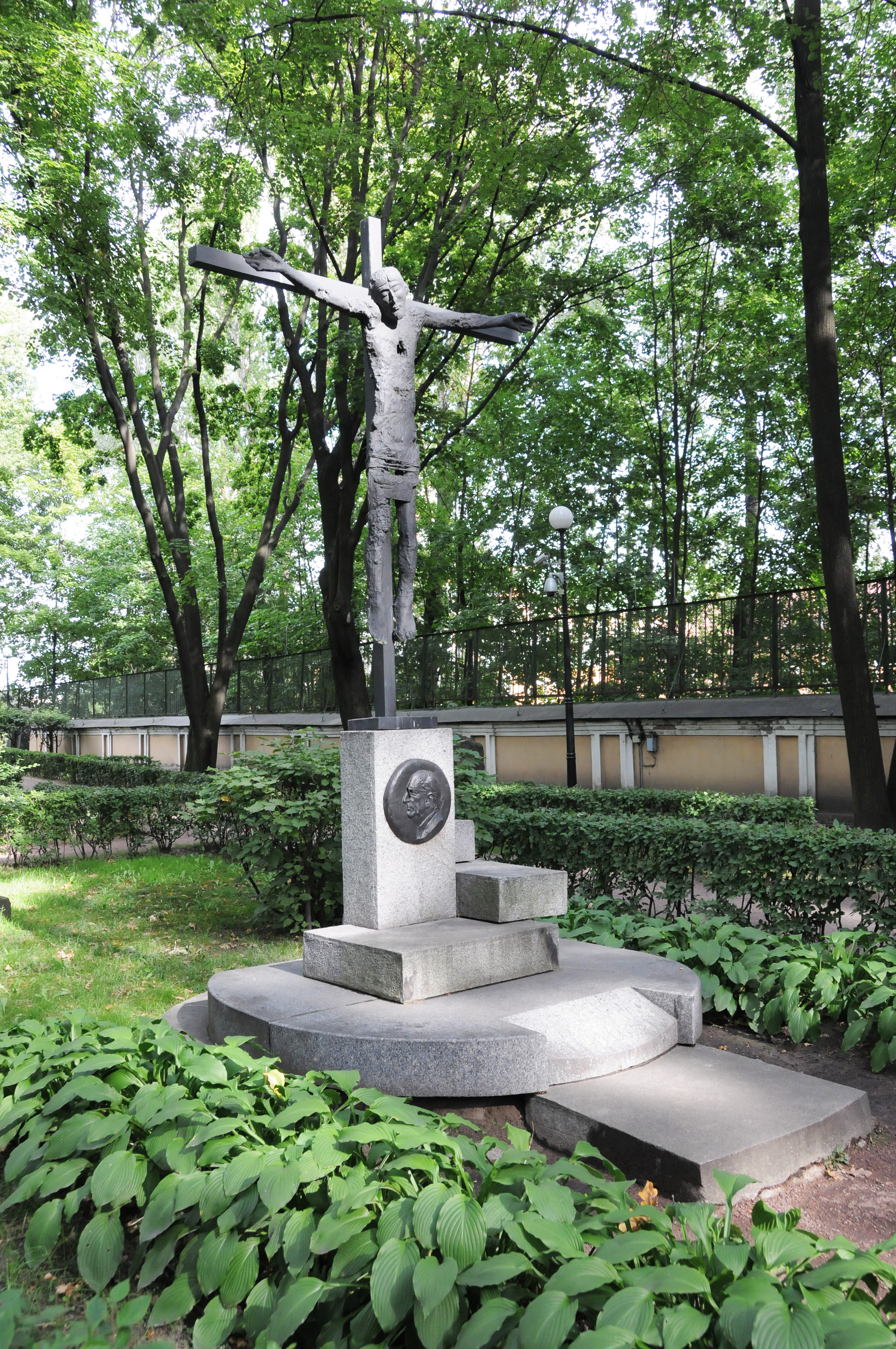
The grave of Georgy Tovstonogov. Buried in 1989, his is one of the very few interments to take place after the 1950s, and is the last person to be buried in the cemetery to date

During the Second World War and the siege of Leningrad, the museum worked to provide protection and shelter for monuments. Only a single gravestone was damaged, that of the actress Varvara Asenkova. The monument, designed by Ivan Sosnytsky, consisted of a granite canopy over a pedestal with a verse epitaph and bronze bust of the actress by Ivan Vitali and had been transferred along with the actress's remains from the Smolensky Cemetery in 1936. It was destroyed by a direct hit from a bomb in 1943. In 1955 the museum installed a marble replica of the bust made by D.A. Sprishinym. Other monuments were stored in the Lavra's Annunciation Church.

Restoration work began immediately after the end of the war, with the necropolis-museum opening in August 1947. The programme of moving and installing monuments resumed after the war and continued until the mid-1950s. There were also several burials of prominent Soviet citizens, as the cemetery gained the status of an urban pantheon. Those buried here included the scientist Sergey Lebedev in 1934, artist Mikhail Avilov in 1954, and actor Nikolay Cherkasov in 1966. In 1972 the remains of the composer Alexander Glazunov were transferred from Paris. In 1968 Fyodor Dostoevsky's wife Anna Dostoevskaya was reburied next to her husband, while theatre director Georgy Tovstonogov was interred in the cemetery in 1989. So far Tovstonogov's has been the last burial to take place in the cemetery.

== See also ==
- List of burial places of classical musicians
