= 1787 in Russia =

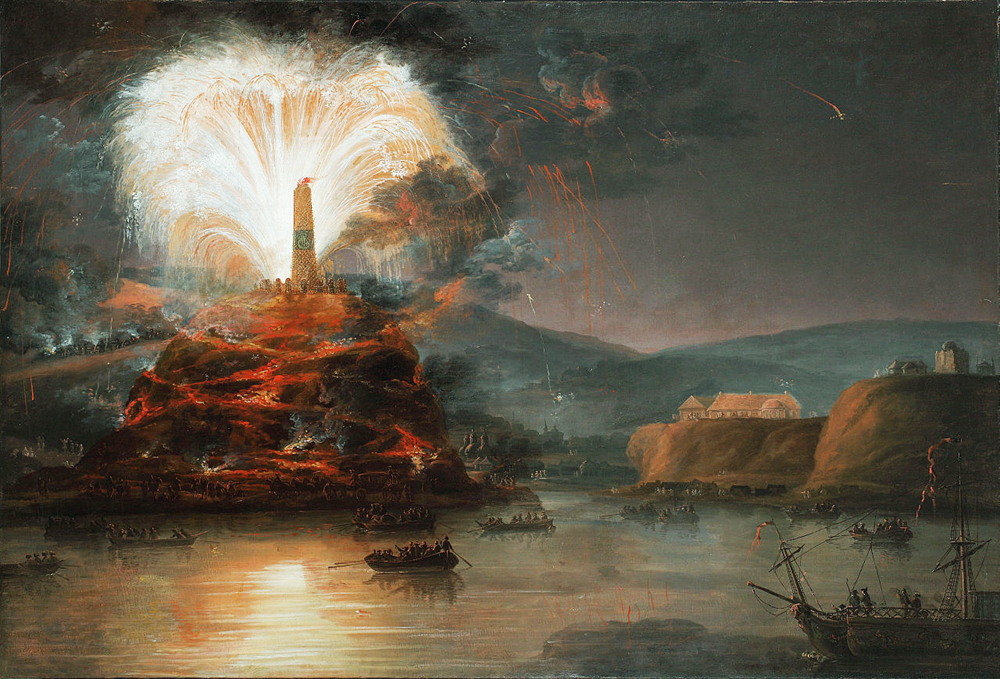
A night illumination in honor of Catherine the Great on the Dnieper River

Events from the year 1787 in Russia

== Incumbents ==
- Monarch – Catherine II

== Events ==
- Black Sea Cossack Host formed
- Crimean journey of Catherine the Great
- Russo-Turkish War (1787–92) begins
  - Battle of Kinburn (1787)
- Lomonosov Bridge completed in Saint Petersburg

== Births ==
- Alexander Alyabyev – composer
- Grigol Bagration of Mukhrani – Georgian nobleman, Russian officer
- Konstantin Batyushkov – poet, essayist, and translator
- Jean Armand de Lestocq – French doctor, adventurer, and courtier
- Alexander Ivanovich Dmitriev-Mamonov – general and painter of battle scenes
- Nikolay Gretsch – writer, grammarian, and journalist
- Semyon Korsakov – homeopath and inventor
- Michael Lunin – political philosopher, revolutionary
- Alexander Sergeyevich Menshikov – nobleman, general, government official
- Ivan Nabokov – general
- Alexey Fyodorovich Orlov – general, diplomat, and statesman
- Antony Pogorelsky – writer
- Alexandr Mikhailovich Potemkin – nobleman and soldier, patron of the Holy Mountains Lavra monastery
- Nymphodora Semenova – opera singer
- Aleksei Sokolov – priest who lived in Russian Alaska
- Pavel Svinyin – writer, painter, editor
- Aleksandr Vitberg – architect
- Otto von Kotzebue – navy captain, explorer
- Maksim Vorobyov – landscape painter
- Yekaterina Yezhova – actress and socialite

== Deaths ==
- Alexei Antonovich of Brunswick – member of the royal family
- Alexei Turchaninov – businessman
