= Anna Olenina =

Russian writer and singer (1808–1888)

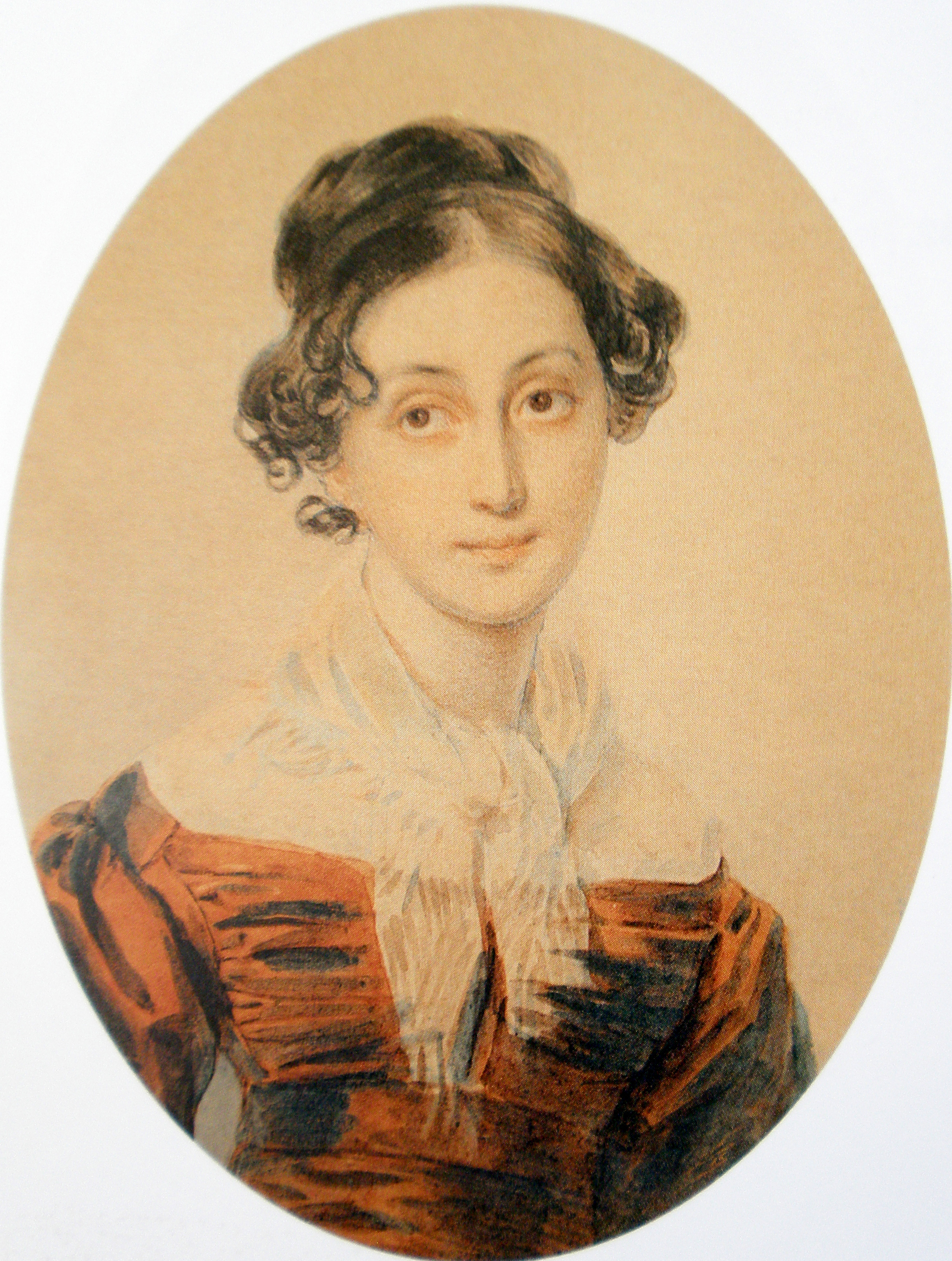
- Born: Anna Olenina; August 1808
- Died: December 1888 (aged 80)
- Spouse: Théodore Andrault (m. 1840; died 1885)

Anna Alekseyevna "Annette" Olenina (Russian: Анна Алексеевна Оленина; August 1808 – December 1888) was a Russian noblewoman and writer, who is the author of unpublished diaries and memoirs about Alexander Pushkin.

== Life ==
Olenina was the youngest daughter of State Secretary Alexei Nikolayevich Olenin and his wife Elizaveta Markovna. In her younger years she wrote music for Ryleyev's "The Death of Yermak". At the age of 17 she was made a damsel of the imperial court.

The Olenins' house was a center of literary and artistic life in St. Petersburg. In the late 1810s, she met Alexander Pushkin. They started developing a romantic relationship in May 1827, when Pushkin returned from his seven-year exile and frequently visited the Olenins in St. Petersburg and at the Prijutino country estate. In 1828 and 1829 Pushkin dedicated a number of poems to Olenina. In 1829, Pushkin asked for Anna's hand in marriage, but received a resolute refusal from her mother. Nikolai Ivanovich Gneditsch addressed four poems to her, which he published in an anthology in 1832. Ivan Andreyevich Krylov, Mikhail Yuryevich Lermontov, Ivan Ivanovich Kozlov, and Dmitri Vladimirovich Wenewitinov also dedicated poems to her.

After Pushkin's death, Olenina married Théodore Andrault in February 1840. In 1844 Olenina moved to Warsaw with her husband. In 1850, Olenina asked Emperor Nicholas I to allow her husband to bear the title of count and his father's name, which was refused because of insufficient documents. She wrote diaries and memoirs about Pushkin that have not yet been published.

After the death of her husband in Warsaw in 1885, Olenina settled in the Derashne country estate of her youngest daughter, Countess Antonina Fyodorovna Uvarowa in the Volhynia Governorate. Olenina died in 1888 and was buried in the cemetery of the Trinity Monastery in Korets.
