= Maria Manaseina =

Russian physician

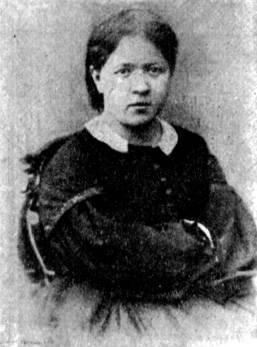
Maria Manaseina (1860)

Maria Mikhaĭlovna Manàsseina, also known as Marie de Manacéïne, was a neuroscientist who specialized in the area of sleep deprivation. She was born in Korkunova in 1841 and died in Saint Petersburg on 17 March in 1903. She was buried at the Novodévitxi cemetery. Manàsseina was the daughter of Mikhaïl Korkunov, a historian; her brother Nikolai Korkunov was a philosopher. She was the disciple of the professor Ivan Tarkhànov.

Manàsseina was one of the first women in the Russian Empire to graduate in medicine. First, she received a special certification authorizing her as a "female doctor" and, later, the official Medicine degree certification. She is nowadays considered an expert neuroscientist in the field of physiological chemistry and a pioneer in somnology (the study of sleep or sleep science) and biochemistry. She published numerous articles in French, Russian, and German under different names: Marie de Manacéïne, Maria Manàsseina, or Marie von Manassein. She was not uncommonly referred to as a male doctor. Despite her outstanding contributions, in the last ten years, her name has not been cited more than 100 times.

== Personal life ==
While still a student, Manàsseina married another student, Mr Poniatovsky. They participated alongside in the Narodniki revolutionary circles. The Narodniki movement was a kind of socialism built upon economically autonomous entities; several towns were united to create a kind of federation to substitute the state.

However she became strongly anti-revolutionary as an adult. She provided the ministry of Education with research and information on how to control and suppress student protests and revolutionary activity. Moreover, she publicly expressed her loyalty to the tsarist government, for which she received generous amounts of money.

Considering these contradictions in her biography, one can believe that Manàsseina opted for a more conservative ideology over the years. However, it is not unreasonable to think —taking into account the difficulties faced by women to establish themselves in the scientific and academic world— that Manàsseina publicly conformed to the ideologies of the government to receive financial support and continue her career.

Poniatovsky, her first husband, was arrested and he died during political exile. In 1856, she married Vyacheslav Avksentievich Manassein, a renowned man in the field of medicine in Russia.

== Contributions to Science ==
=== Neuroscience ===
Manàsseina's most distinguished contribution in the field of neuroscience was her research on sleep deprivation. She was one of the first scientists to state that while we sleep the brain is active.

To conduct this investigation, she worked alongside professor Ivan Romanovich Tarkhanov, who was also interested in sleep disorders. They put ten puppies (two to four months old) under a state of permanent insomnia by keeping them constantly active. These puppies had previously been fed and well taken care of; however, the sleep deprivation was fatal after four to five days, leading to the death of all the puppies. As a control measure, they deprived other puppies of food. Even though they had been starving for 20–25 days, they could be rescued and returned to a healthy condition. These results clearly showed the importance of sleeping for life to be maintained and that sleep deprivation leads to a faster death than the deprivation of nutrients. Further research showed that the effects of sleep deprivation in the puppies included a body temperature decrease of four to six degrees, suggesting a halt in the homeostatis system as well as a reduction of the number of red blood cells, local brain hemorrhages, cerebral ganglion impairment, etc.

As a consequence of this research, Manàsseina concluded that sleeping is as necessary as nutrition for the regeneration of the brain cells. She also emphasized the idea that, during sleep, there is a particular activity in the brain. This assertion challenged the prevailing belief at that time that sleeping was merely a passive state of the organism. She also stressed that only the brain structures involved in maintaining consciousness are inactive during sleep–thus, sleeping means resting the consciousness. This intuition is remarkable considering that the electroencephalogram didn't yet exist.

Her work had a great impact on the scientific community and many scientists replicated her model:

In 1896, the American psychologists George T.W. Patrick and J. Allen Gilbert conducted the first sleep deprivation experiment on humans. In 1898, Italian investigators Lamberto Daddi and Giulio Tarozzi and, separately, Cesare Agostini, expanded Manàsseina's findings by conducting detailed histopathologic and anatomic analyses of the puppies' brains.

=== Biochemistry ===
Though Manàsseina worked in Saint Petersburg the majority of her life, she spent several months at the Polytechnic Institute of Viena working alongside Jullius Wiesner. There, she made a noteworthy finding concerning the fermentation process, which was an important contribution to the field of biochemistry. Against the prevailing belief at that time, Manàsseina was the first to claim that the fermentation process is due to the action of enzymes that can be isolated from the yeast cells. Therefore, she concluded that yeast fermentation is a cell-independent process.

A few years later, Eduard Buchner replicated the results of this research and published them. Despite his being aware of Manàsseina's work, he considered her experiments to be unreliable and he did not cite her nor give her any credit. Despite her efforts to obtain recognition for this discovery, it was Buchner who received a Nobel Prize in 1907.

== Publications ==
Maria Manàsseina wrote the first book about medical problems related to sleep. This work addresses dreams as "evidence of a permanent psychic life generated by the brain during sleep". Nevertheless, her most outstanding publication is "Le Sommeil, tiers de notre vie" ("Sleeping, a third of the human life"), which was published in 1892.

- L'anarchie passive et le comte Léon Tolstoï (1895)
- Sommeil, tiers de notre vie, pathologie, physiologie, hygiène, psychologie (1896)
