= Nikolai Korkunov =

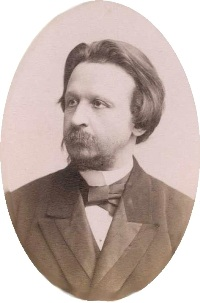

Nikolai Mikhailovich Korkunov (Николай Михайлович Коркунов; 26 April [O.S. 14 April] 1853 – 10 December [O.S. 27 November] 1904) was a leading authority on constitutional law and legal sociology in the Russian Empire.

His father was Mikhail Korkunov, a noted Russian historian. His sister Marie de Manacéïne was known for her pioneering studies of sleep and dreams. After Aleksandr Gradovsky's death in 1889 Korkunov held the chair in constitutional and international law at the University of Saint Petersburg.

Korkunov was also active in the Commission for the Laws of Finland. He argued that Grand Duchy of Finland's claim to sovereignty was groundless. He defined autocracy as the "sovereignty of the ruler, the unlimited character of his rule, but at the same time the need to limit this rule by legal principles, basic laws of his own making".

An English translation of Korkunov's General Theory of Law appeared in Boston in 1909. It was reprinted by Beard Books in 2000. Some of his basic ideas were later elaborated by Leon Petrazycki.
