= Gate Church =

Church in St. Petersburg, Russia

Coordinates: 59°55′23.5″N 30°23′11.3″E

Church of the Icon of the Mother of God Joy of All Who Sorrow Церковь Иконы Божией Матери Всех Скорбящих Радость
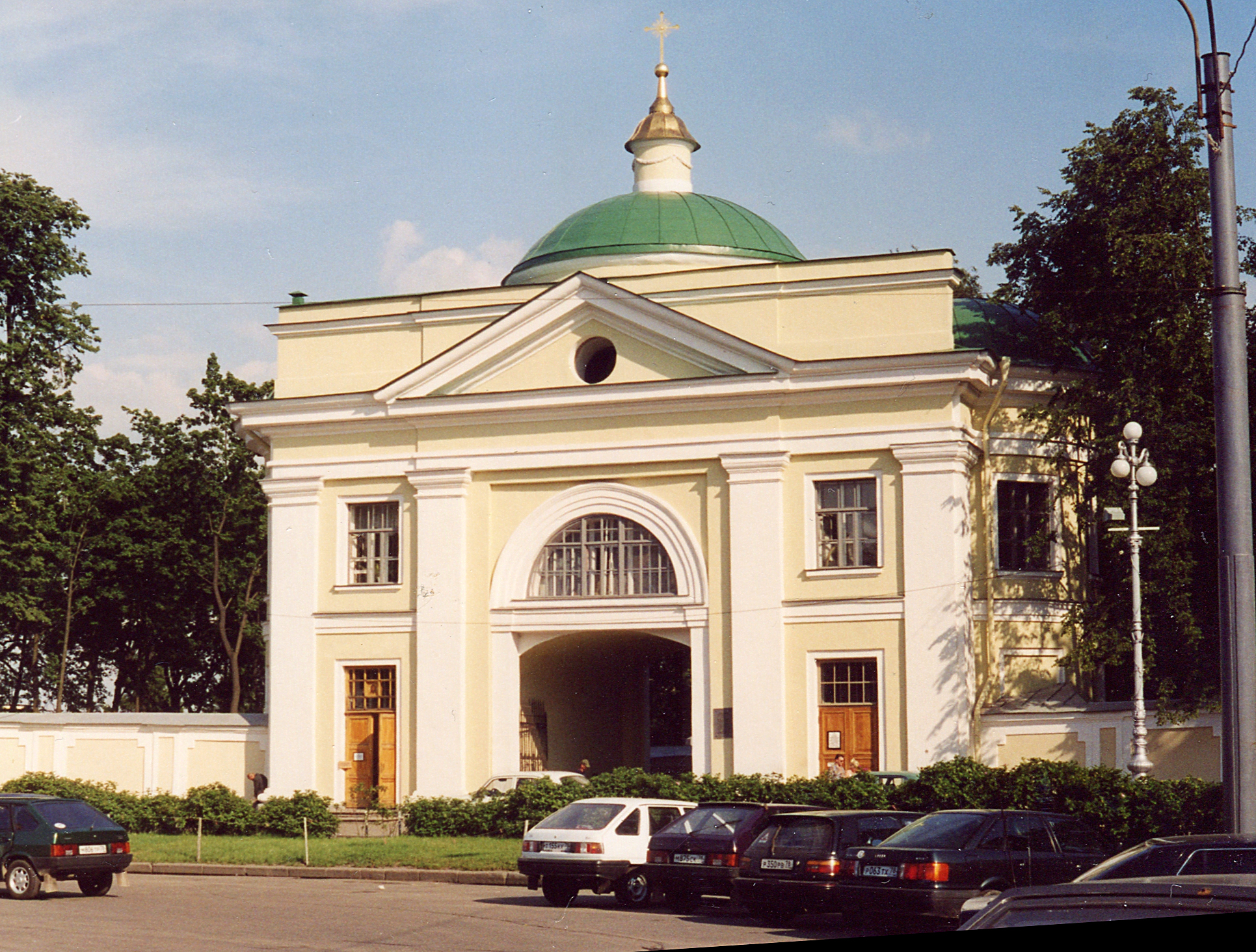

Religion
- Affiliation: Russian Orthodox

Location
- Location: Monastyrki Embankment 1, Saint Petersburg
- Interactive map of Church of the Icon of the Mother of God Joy of All Who Sorrow; Церковь Иконы Божией Матери Всех Скорбящих Радость

Architecture
- Architect: Ivan Starov
- Style: Neoclassicism
- Groundbreaking: 1784
- Completed: 1786

Website
- www.lavra.spb.ru

The Gate Church (Russian: Надвратная церковь), or formally the Church of the Icon of the Mother of God Joy of All Who Sorrow (Russian: Церковь Иконы Божией Матери Всех Скорбящих Радость) is a Russian Orthodox church in Saint Petersburg. It is in the Diocese of Saint Petersburg and is part of the Alexander Nevsky Lavra.

Prior to the building of the church, from 1725, the gate from the Nevsky Prospect included a two-tiered bell tower with clock. Between 1753 and 1754, a new wooden bell tower was erected and the bells and clock from the old tower were installed in it.

== Design and construction ==
The church was built as part of the development of the main entrance to the monastery from Nevsky Prospect. Designed by architect Ivan Starov in 1783, it envisaged a wall marking the boundary of the monastery, with access through a gate church, decorated with Doric pilasters and topped with a low dome. Construction of the church took place from 1784 to 1785 under the auspices of M.E. Melentyev, with the interior finishing carried out between autumn 1785 and spring 1786. By one account, the icons were brought from the private chapel of Prince Grigory Potemkin.

The church was consecrated on 15 July 1786, dedicated to the icon of the Mother of God "Joy of All Who Sorrow". Two two-storey residential buildings, today Nevsky Prospect Numbers 177 and 190, and a one-storey poorhouse, were built on the western side of Alexander Nevsky Square between 1788 and 1789, completing the ensemble. On 1 July 1800, the Spiritual Consistory decreed that the church would function as a parish for artisans serving the Lavra, and for those who rented space along the Kalashnikovskaya Embankment from the monastery.

== Latvian parish and Soviet period ==
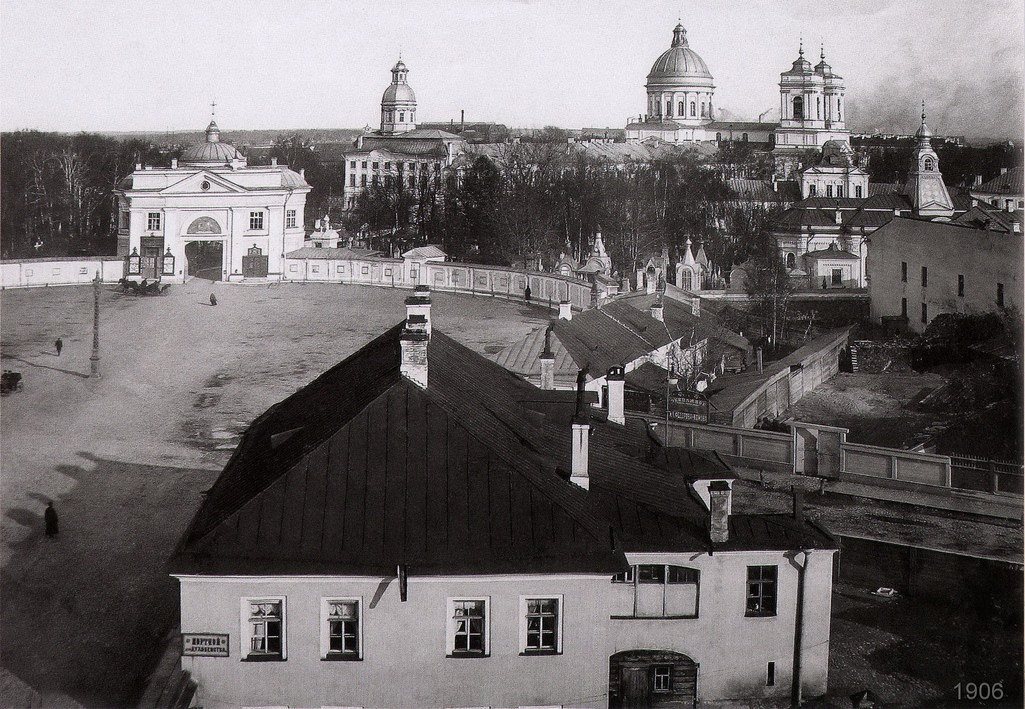
Alexander Nevsky Square in 1906. The Gate Church forms a passageway into the monastery grounds in the middle ground. In the background rise the spires and domes of the Lavra.

In 1806, the church's walls were painted; and in 1860, repairs were carried out under the supervision of Mikhail Shchurupov. In 1904, by authorisation of the Most Holy Synod, the Gate Church hosted a Latvian parish. Services and ceremonies were performed in the Latvian language, and the church hosted a library of books and periodicals, until the Latvian parish was dissolved in 1918. The church was closed in October 1931, and in the 1930s, housed the district council of the Society for the Promotion of Defence, Aviation and Chemical Construction, abbreviated as OSOAVIAKHIM (Russian: ОСОАВИАХИМ).

The church underwent restoration after the siege of Leningrad, between 1949 and 1950, and was used as offices by the directorship of the State Museum of Urban Sculpture.

== Post-Soviet period ==
The building was returned to the Orthodox Church on 15 April 1994. In September 1997, Bishop Nazariy consecrated a chapel in the left wing of the church in the name of the icon of the Mother of God "Joy of All Who Sorrow". On 23 September 2014, the church was re-consecrated by the Metropolitan of St. Petersburg and Ladoga Varsonofy Sudakov, and the first Divine Liturgy was held.
