= Grigory Lishin =

Russian poet, theatre critic and composer

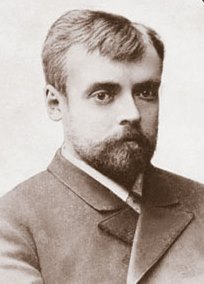
The composer

Grigory Andreevich Lishin (Лишин, Григорий Андреевич St Petersburg, 23 April 1854 - 15 June 1888) was a poet, theatre critic and composer from the Russian Empire. He composed two operas after texts of Pushkin: Graf Nulin (after Count Nulin) and Tsigane (after The Gypsies), but was mainly known for his songs.

== Selected recordings ==
The song "Она хохотала" (She laughed) was recorded by Chaliapin and later by Raffaele Arie.
