= Alexander Nevsky Square =

Formerly called Red Square, a city square in Tsentralny District, Saint Petersburg

Coordinates: 59°55′25″N 30°23′07″E

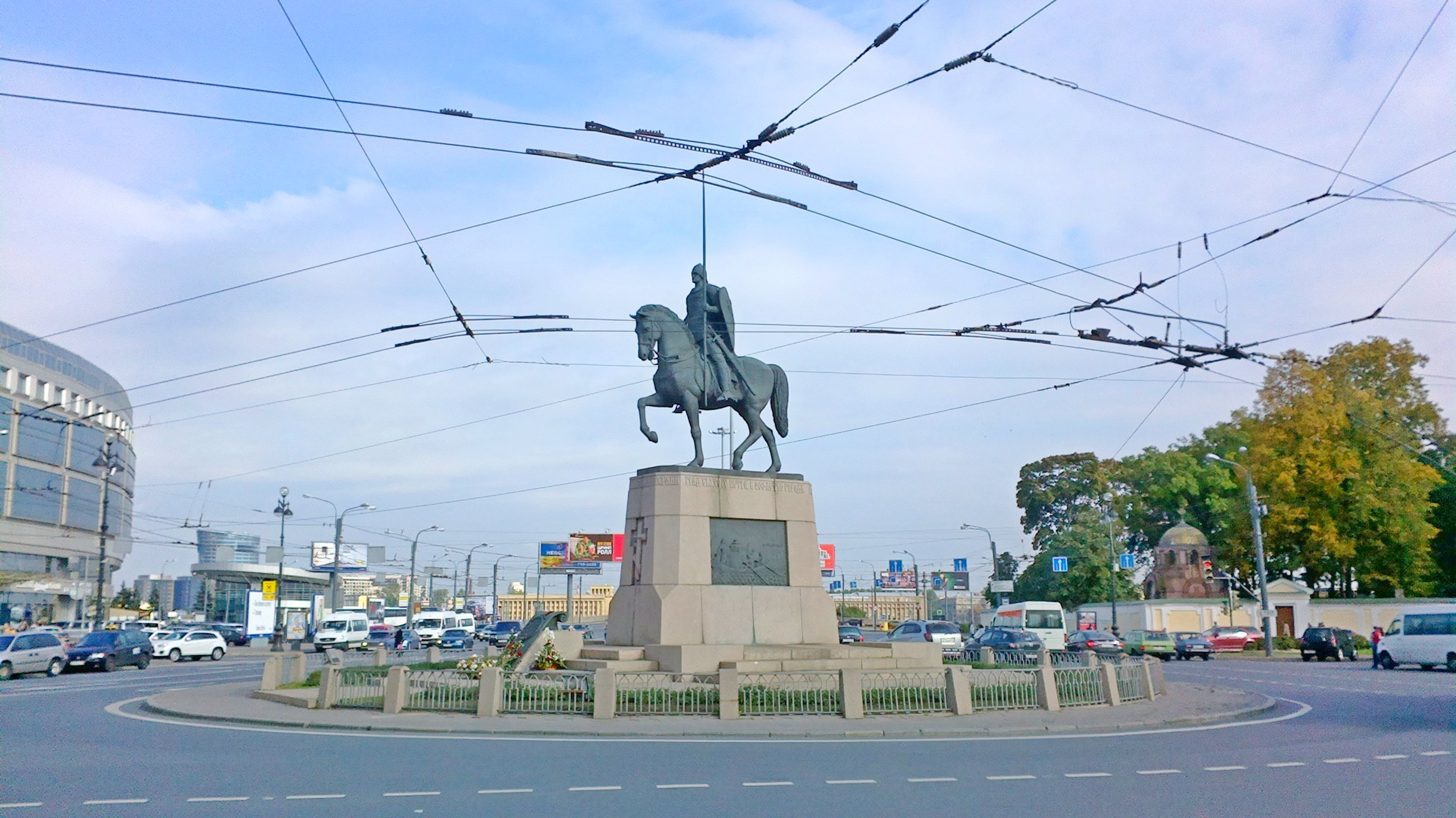
The statue of Alexander Nevsky in the centre of Alexander Nevsky Square

Alexander Nevsky Square (Russian: Площадь Александра Невского, romanized: Ploshchad Aleksandra Nevskogo), formerly called Red Square, is a city square in Tsentralny District, Saint Petersburg. At the east end of Nevsky Prospekt, linking the street with the Alexander Nevsky Lavra, it is named after medieval Russian Prince Alexander Nevsky.

Designed as part of the development of the monastery in the late 18th century, the square had received its name by at least 1784, and was laid out in the 1790s with the building of the Gate Church, and the establishment of a stone wall boundary. Several apartment buildings and an almshouse owned by the monastery were built fronting the square and Nevsky Prospekt. The alternative name Alexander Nevsky Lavra Square entered usage in the mid-19th century. By the early 20th century the square was considerably neglected and rundown. It was considered unsafe to walk through at night due to the likelihood of being robbed, while urban legends about voracious rats circulated. It was renamed Red Square in the early Soviet period, but reverted to Alexander Nevsky Square in 1952.

The area was redeveloped in the 1960s with the completion of the Alexander Nevsky Bridge, and the opening of the Hotel Moscow and the metro station Ploshchad Alexandra Nevskogo. Another metro station, Ploshchad Alexandra Nevskogo-2, opened in the 1980s and in 2002 long-held plans for a monument to Alexander Nevsky came to fruition with the installation of a bronze equestrian sculpture in the square.

== Development ==
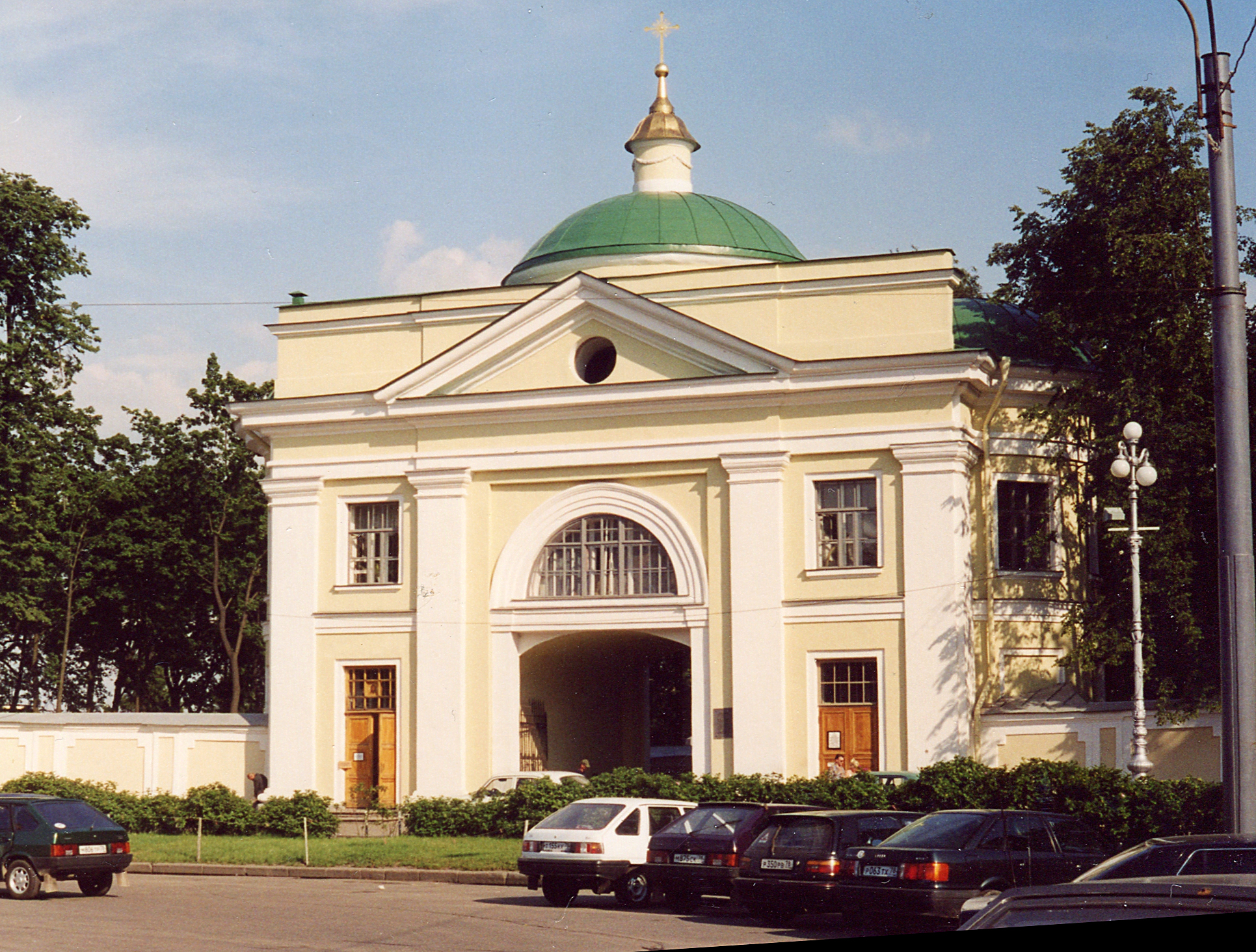
Starov's Gate Church at one end of the square forms the access point into the Alexander Nevsky Lavra

The Alexander Nevsky Monastery was established by Peter the Great in the 1710s, marking the site where he believed Alexander Nevsky had defeated the Swedes at the Battle of the Neva in 1240. The space between the monastery and the route of Nevsky Prospekt remained largely undeveloped during the seventeenth century, with the boundary marked only with a wooden fence and a wooden bell tower built in 1754 on the edge of what later became Alexander Nevsky Square. By the late seventeenth century the houses of Nevsky Prospekt had begun to encroach on this space. While Empress Elizabeth I had patronized the Smolny Convent, the accession of Empress Catherine II brought a renewed interest in completing the Alexander Nevsky Monastery.

In 1784 a commission examined the options for further developing the monastery. The square was likely laid out by the diocese architect Ivan Starov in the latter half of the eighteenth century to provide access from the main road through the city, Nevsky Prospekt, and the developing monastery complex. Starov was also working on several buildings for the monastery, including its main cathedral, the Holy Trinity Cathedral, and the Gate Church, which fronted the square. His assistant, Mikhail Melentyev, built a semi-circular stone wall around the square, and by 1784 it had become known as the Alexander Nevsky Square, referring to the monastery, whose buildings now framed all sides of the square. Starov added further apartment buildings on Nevsky Prospekt, and an almshouse on the square. From 1857 until at least the 1880s the name Alexander Nevsky Lavra Square was also in use.

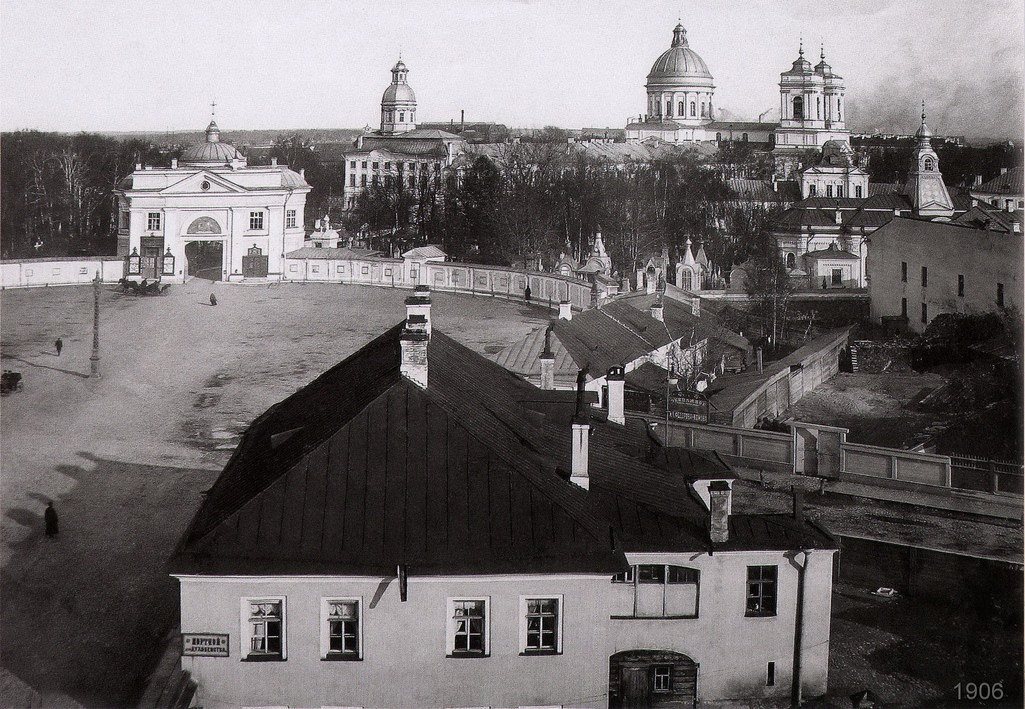
The square in 1906. The Gate Church is visible, and in the distance rise the spires and domes of the lavra.

By the nineteenth and early twentieth centuries the square had become rundown and was considered a disreputable area, housing grain barns and tram tracks. It was barely lit at night and became notorious for passers-by being robbed. It was also well known for the large numbers of rats that came to feed on the grain, and at night moved to the nearby river to drink. A popular urban legend of the 1920s recorded how a cab driver and his horse tried to pass through the area at night, with only their skeletons, gnawed clean by rats, found the following day.

== Soviet period ==
The space was renamed Red Square on 15 December 1923 as part of an ongoing anti-religious campaign. In 1936 the square was part of the route of the first trolley bus line in the city. On 15 December 1952 it was renamed Alexander Nevsky Square, this time after the saint rather than the monastery. The area was redeveloped after the opening of the Alexander Nevsky Bridge on 5 November 1965, with the demolition of the older buildings and the construction of the Ploshchad Alexandra Nevskogo metro station and the Hotel Moscow. In 1985 a second metro station, Ploshchad Alexandra Nevskogo-2, was opened.

== Statue ==
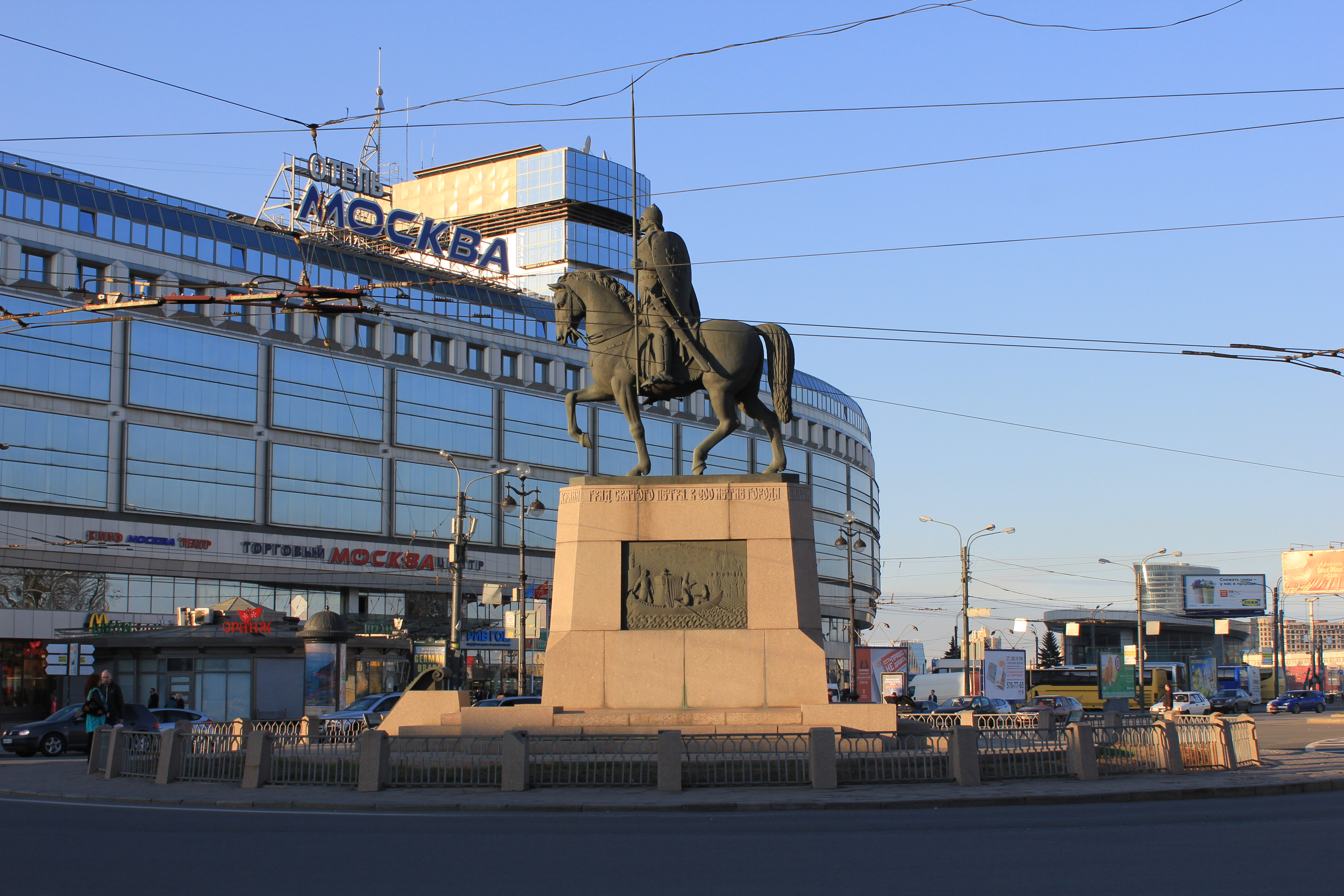
The bronze statue of Alexander Nevsky, and in the background, the Hotel Moscow.

On 9 May 2002, as part of the 300th anniversary celebrations of Saint Petersburg, a bronze equestrian statue of Alexander Nevsky was unveiled in the square. Designed by architects Vladimir Popov and Gennadiy Peychev, it was sculpted by Valentin Kozenyuk and Aleksandr Palmin, with the assistance of Albert Charkin. The pedestal is 5 m (16 ft) high, and the statue 5.1 m (17 ft) high. At its unveiling it was consecrated by Patriarch Alexy II of Moscow and Metropolitan Vladimir. On 12 September 2005 two bronze bas-reliefs were installed on the pedestal, the work of architect Vladimir Popov and sculptor Aleksandr Palmin, which depict the Battle of the Neva and the installation of the relics of Alexander Nevsky in the Alexander Nevsky Monastery.

The installation was the completion of proposals as far back as the mid-1970s to place a monument to Alexander Nevsky in the city. Kozenyuk had exhibited a plaster model of a monument to Nevsky to the Union of Architects in 1975. In 1987 he submitted a bronze version to a competition to build a Nevsky monument in Ust-Izhora, the supposed site of the Battle of the Neva, but the design was not selected. In 1990 it placed second in a competition to build such a monument in Leningrad, behind a design offered by B. N. Nikanorov. The holders of the first three places were asked to develop their designs further, and with Nikanorov's death in 1992, Kosenyuk's design was selected in the second round of the competition. The work was further developed by Kosenyuk and architect Gennadiy Peychev, until Kosenyuk's death in 1997. The design work was completed by sculptor Aleksandr Palmin and architect Vladimir Popov and on 22 March 1999 the Governor of Saint Petersburg Vladimir Yakovlev approved the construction and installation of the monument by the Baltic Construction Company. The foundation stone was laid on 15 April 1999, but disagreements over the siting of the monument and its orientation caused Peychev to drop out of the project. The statue, weighing nine tonnes, was cast in December 2001 and delivered to the site on 7 March 2002.

Today Alexander Nevsky Square is a major traffic intersection, while providing foot access to the Alexander Nevsky Lavra.

== See also ==
- List of squares in Saint Petersburg
