= Anton Delvig =

Russian poet and journalist (1798–1831)

Anton Antonovich Delvig
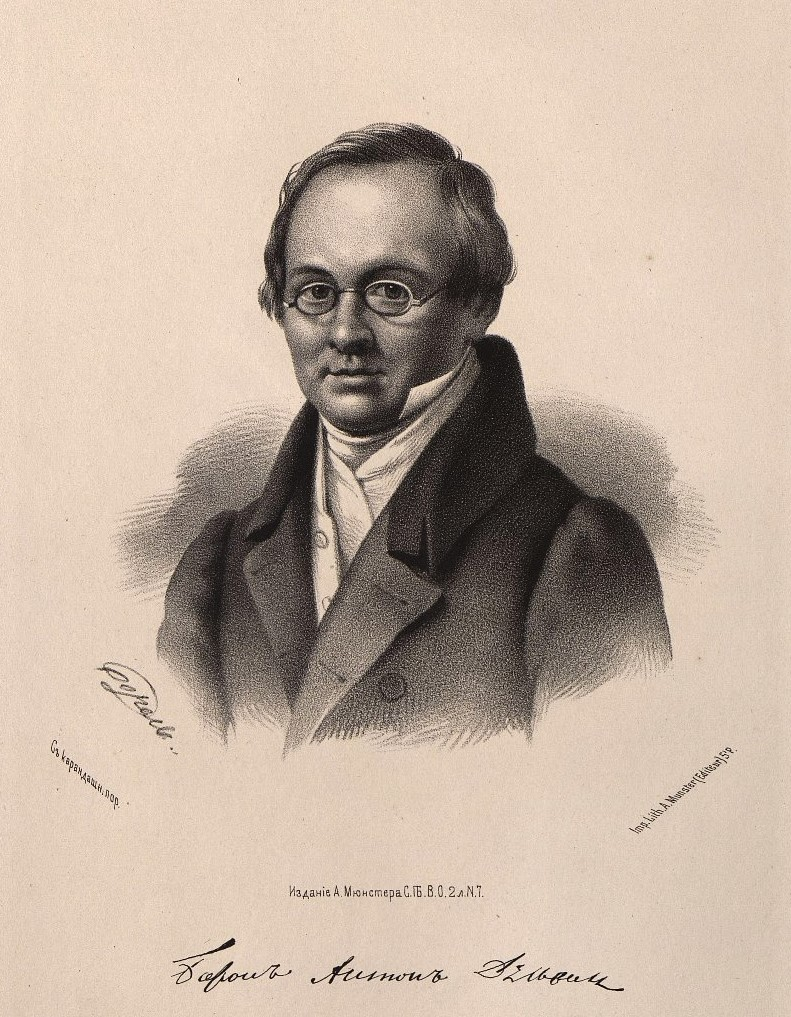
- Lithograph by Pyotr Borel, 1864–1869
- Born: 17 August [O.S. 6 August] 1798; Moscow, Russia
- Died: 26 January [O.S. 14 January] 1831; St. Petersburg, Russia
- Education: Tsarskoye Selo Lyceum
- Occupations: Poet; journalist

Baron Anton Antonovich Delvig (Note: Russian: Анто́н Анто́нович Де́львиг, pre-reform spelling: Антонъ Антоновичъ Дельвигъ, Russian pronunciation: [ɐnˈton ɐnˈtonəvʲɪtɕ ˈdelʲvʲɪk]; German: Anton Antonowitsch Freiherr von Delwig.) (17 August [O.S. 6 August] 1798 – 26 January [O.S. 14 January] 1831) was a Russian poet and journalist of Baltic German descent.

== Early life ==
Anton Delvig was born on 17 August [O.S. 6 August] 1798. He was of Baltic German descent. He studied at the Tsarskoye Selo Lyceum together with Alexander Pushkin and Wilhelm Küchelbecker, with whom he became close friends. Küchelbecker dedicated a poem ('O, Delvig') to him; this poem was later set to music by Dmitri Shostakovich in the ninth movement of his fourteenth symphony. As a teenager, Delvig began writing poetry. He became connected with a literary group established by Alexey Olenin and the Free Society of Lovers of Literature, Science, and the Arts.

== Career ==
Delvig is also mentioned in Pushkin's famous novel in verse Eugene Onegin, being compared to the young poet Lensky. Delvig commissioned the renowned portrait of Pushkin from Orest Kiprensky, which Pushkin bought from Delvig's widow after his friend's death. In 1820, Delvig met Yevgeny Baratynsky and introduced him to the literary press.

In his poetry, Delvig upheld the waning traditions of Russian Neoclassicism. He became interested in Russian folklore and wrote numerous imitations of folk songs. Some of these were put to music by the composers Alexander Alyabyev and Mikhail Glinka.

As a journalist, Delvig edited the periodical Northern Flowers (1825–1831), in which Pushkin was a regular contributor. In 1830–1831, he co-edited with Pushkin the Literaturnaya Gazeta, which was banned by the Tsarist government after information laid by Thaddeus Bulgarin.

== Personal life ==
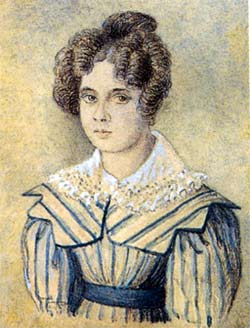
Delvig's wife, Sofya Saltykova (1806–1888)

In 1825, Delvig married Sofya Saltykova; they had one daughter. He died on 26 January [O.S. 14 January] 1831.

== Sources ==
- "Дельвиг, Антон Антонович" . Brockhaus and Efron Encyclopedic Dictionary (in Russian). 1906.
- Cornwell, Neil (2 December 2013). "Anton Antonovich Del'vig, 1798–1831". Reference Guide to Russian Literature. Routledge. p. 17. ISBN 978-1-134-26070-6.
