= Ivan Tarkhanov (physiologist) =

Georgian physiologist and science populariser

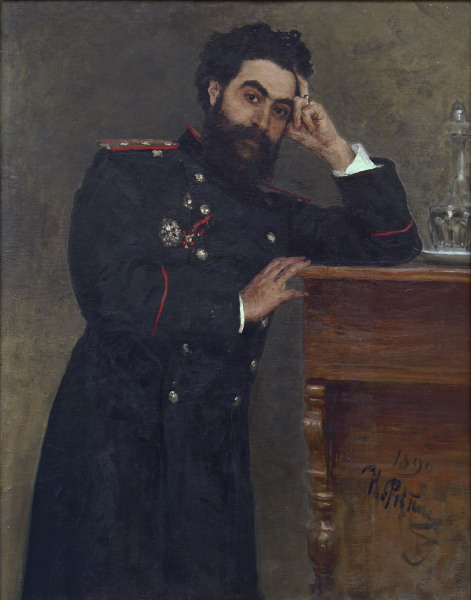
Tarkhanov's portrait by Ilya Repin

Ivan Romanovich Tarkhanov (Russian: Иван Романович Тарханов) or Ivane Tarkhnishvili (Georgian: ივანე რამაზის–ძე თარხნიშვილი, თარხან-მოურავი; June 1846 – September 1908) was a Georgian physiologist and science populariser from the Tarkhan-Mouravi noble family. He led the Department of Physiology at the Academy of Military Medicine from 1877 to 1895 and authored a slew of articles on physiology for the Brockhaus and Efron Encyclopedic Dictionary. Among his numerous contributions was the discovery of the skin galvanic reflex (1889). However, Tarkhnishvili's most significant contribution was the discovery of the influence of X-rays on the central nervous system, animal behavior, the heart and circulation, and embryonic development (1896-1903). Indeed, these works have given rise to a new field in science as Radiobiology.

== Life ==
Ivan Tarkhanov (Ivane Tarknishvili) was born on June 15, 1846, in Tbilisi (Tiflis), a capital of Georgia (at that time a part of Russian Empire). His father, Ramaz (Roman) Tarkhnishvili (Tarkhan-Mouravi) (1799-1871) achieved the distinguished rank of lieutenant-general for bravery in Russian-Turkey wars. Tarknishvili was a descendant of an outstanding figure in the history of Georgia, the ruler Giorgi Saakadze (Didi Mouravi) (1570-1629), great commander of the Georgian army and a national hero in the seventeen century. The eleven-year-old Vano, the precocious child of a Russian general active during the Caucasian Wars, interpreted for Alexandre Dumas while French writer was traveled to the Caucasus in 1858. The writer visited his father's family when he was Chief of the Nukha region in Dagestan, in the north-east Caucasus. Dumas was equally affected the external beauty of the boy in the Georgian national raiment with dagger and excellent French speech that did not yield to the Parisians.

In 1860 father brought Ivan to St. Petersburg and enrolled him in Shakseeva's private boarding school where he remained for one year, before moving to the family of close relatives. During this period, he prepared for matriculation and brilliantly passed the exams and matriculated in the second St. Petersburg gymnasium. He realized his father's wishes and entered the Division of Natural Sciences of the Department of Physics and Mathematics at St. Petersburg University. Tarkhanov began to study physiology with a passion, under the supervision of Prof. F.V. Ovsyannikov (1827-1906). Simultaneously, he attended at the lectures given by Ivan M. Sechenov (1829-1905) at the St. Petersburg Medico-Surgical Academy. Tarkhanov stayed at St. Petersburg University for a short period, but because of his political action in speaking against the university administration for students right and freedom on April 9, 1864, he was forced to leave the university. However, he was able to stay in St. Petersburg by enrolling in the Medico-Surgical Academy. On September 19, 1864, Tarkhanov began attending lectures and joined Sechenov's laboratory at the Medical-Surgery Academy. In 1869, after already graduating with honors from the Academy, he published four more papers and then took examinations for the M.D. degree in 1870.

One year later, Tarkhanov defended his thesis and then went on vacation to Tiflis to arrange family affairs following the death of his father. Here he gave five public lectures, which he went on to publish in Russian as “The Role of the Nervous System in Animal Movement” in the special supplement of the Proceedings of the Caucasian Medical Society (1872).

Preparing for a professorship, for more two years Tarkhanov tripped to Europe visiting many famous scientists in Europe, thus becoming familiar with the educational process, teaching systems, different laboratory devices, and current investigations. He visited F.L. Goltz (1834–1902), F. Hoppe-Seyler (1825–1895), and F.D. von Recklinghausen (1833–1910) in Strasbourg, C. Ludwig (1816–1895) in Leipzig, E. du-Bois-Reymond (1818–1896) in Berlin, H. von Helmholtz (1821–1894) in Heidelberg, and other famous scientists in London, Vienna, and Zurich. In Paris, Tarchanoff joined with C. Bernard (1813–1878), J.-M. Charcot (1825–1893), É.-J. Marey (1830–1904), and L.-A. Ranvier (1835–1922). At the Collège de France, Tarkhanov became friends with C.R. Richet (1850–1935), and Tarkhanov subsequently published a paper in Dictionnaire de Physiologie, edited by Richet (1899).

Returning to Russia, Tarkhanov submitted 15 works completed during his trip to the administration of St. Petersburg Medico-Surgical Academy for the title of Private Docent (1875). In 1877, he was elected Extraordinary Professor and one year later Professor of Physiology. Between 1877 and 1895, Tarkhanov was the head of the Department of Physiology at the Medico-Surgical Academy (St. Petersburg Military Medical Academy after 1881) and pursued varied physiological experiments with his pupils and disciples at the academy until his retirement (1895).

At the end of 1894, Tarkhanov had to leave the Military Medical Academy. In December, a group of reactionaries in the administration of the academy, headed by Prof. V. V. Pashutin (1845–1901), took the opportunity to get rid of Prof. Tarkhanov, the too liberal Scholar-Secretary. He was expelled from the post of Scholar-Secretary, and on March 2, 1895, he was dismissed from the academy before his 50 years of service had been completed. He left a well-equipped laboratory, which had been built up largely from the proceeds of the many public lectures he gave.

After retiring, Tarkhanov delivered lectures in physiology as a lecturer at St. Petersburg University and completed them in 1901. From tracing Tarkhanov's life, it appears that his forced resignation from the Military Medical Academy and the lack of a formal position in which to conduct his scientific work were the main reasons for his untimely death at the age of 62.

The last years of his life Tarkhanov held in Poland, where he built a house near his former student and friend of Napoleon Cybulski. Tarkhanov died on 24 August 1908 in his private house in the village of Nawojowa Góra near Krzeszowice, several kilometers away from Kraków (Poland). He was firstly buried on August 27 in Kraków cemetery and later on September 27, 1908, the body was interred in the cemetery by Alexander Nevsky Lavra of St. Petersburg where is his ornate tombstone. Sculptor was his wife, a polish Jew from Vilnius, Elena Antokolska (1868-1930).

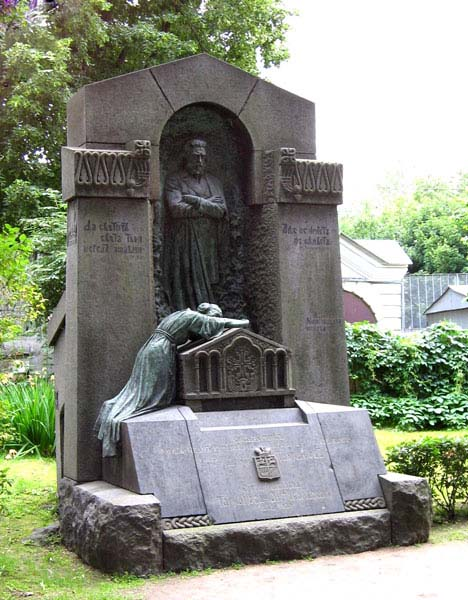
Tarkhanov's tombstone on his grave in the cemetery of Alexander Nevsky Monastery

== Research ==
Tarkhanov was interested in different fields of physiology. His greatest interest was in electrophysiology, which was a direct continuation of the work of I. M. Sechenov, of whom Tarkhanov was one of the first disciples. Tarkhanov engaged in experimental studies on the phenomena of summation in the nervous system (1869). He also studied the influence of compressed air, oxygen, and carbonic acid on nervous irritability (1876). He described the formation of bile pigments in animals and humans (1874) and was one of the first to show (1871) the restoration of fading functions in anemic animals by infusing saline in the body. He dominated work in the field of the physiology of aging (1891) and many other topics. Tarkhanov was one of the first to investigate hypnotic suggestion. Tarkhanov's books, Hypnotism, Suggestion and Mind-reading (1886; translated into French in 1891) and Suggestion and Hypnotism (1905) aroused wide public interest.

In 1885 experiments on cutting and artificial emptying of the seminal vesicles, Tarkhanov showed that the latter played the crucial role in the generation of sexual excitement in frogs. Proceeding from these experimental results, Tarkhanov put forward a hypothesis that filling and evacuation of the seminal vesicles were the main biological cause which led to sexual arousal and its disappearance in mammals and humans.

Tarkhanov is probably best known as a pioneer of psychophysiology and radiobiology. In 1889, he was the first to observe and document the psychogalvanic reflex, i.e., variations in skin electrical potentials in the absence of any external stimuli. Tarkhanov's method is still used today to measure skin potential. It records weak current actually produced by the body. Tarkhanov demonstrated that not only physical stimuli, but also mental activity, resulted in skin potential changes. The skin galvanic reflex is still used in applied psychophysiology as part of the polygraph in lie detection in which changes are recorded in several physiological variables while the subject is asked a series of questions pertaining to a specific issue under investigation.

After irradiating frogs and insects with X-rays in early 1896, several weeks after Röntgen's discovery, Tarkhanov concluded that these newly discovered rays not only photograph, but also "affect the living function". These experiments signaled the birth of radiobiology. Tarkhanov found a marked attenuation of excitability and a total suppression of acidic reflexes. These experiments confirmed that the impairment of reflexes after X-ray exposure depended on neither analgesia nor sensitive skin but on the moderating effect of the central nervous system (CNS) itself. Studying the effects of X-rays on metabolism in the myocardium and the circulation of the heart, he concluded that all of the effects of X-rays were due to their moderating or retarding the activity of the CNS (1896). A few years later, Tarkhanov presented an extensive paper on the role of X-rays in biology and medicine (1903). Thus, his pioneer works had indeed forecast a new field of science as radiobiology.

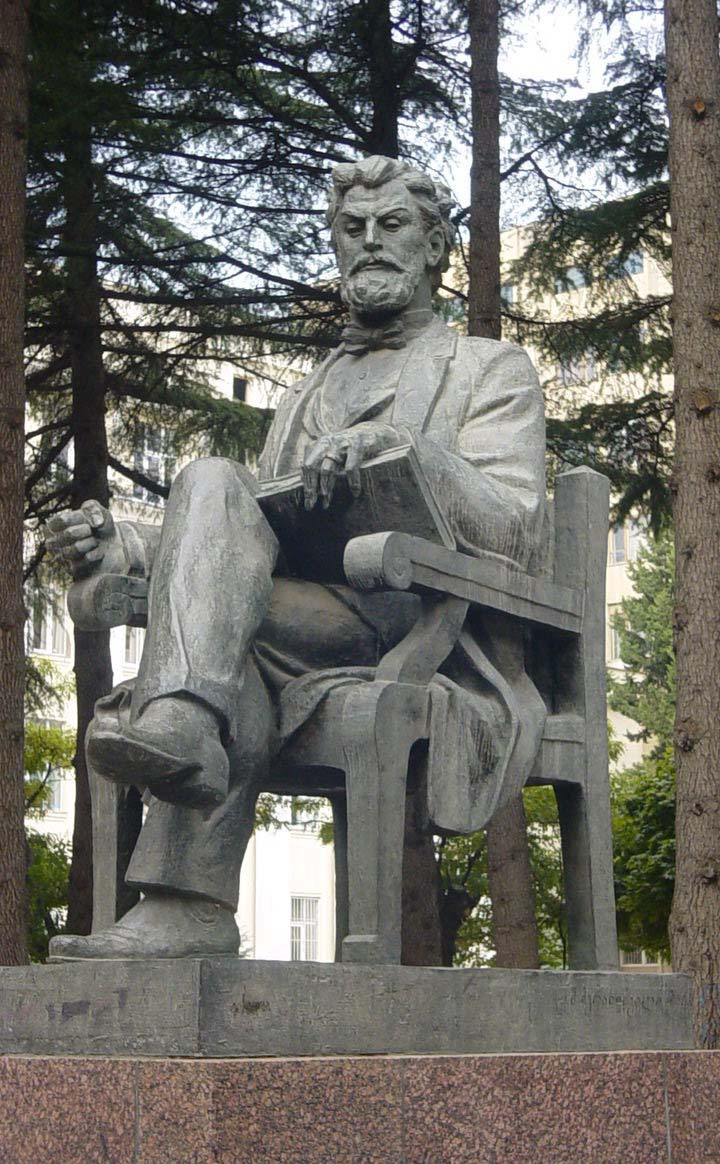
The monument of Tarkhanov in front of Tbilisi Medical University

Tarkhanov worked intensively at translating many medical and physiology textbooks, among them Technical Textbook of Histology, by L.-A. Ranvier (1876) and General Muscle and Nerve Physiology by I. Rosenthal (1879). Between the years 1892 and 1904, Tarkhanov contributed nearly 160 articles, from B to Z, in physiology and medicine to the Brockhaus and Efron Encyclopedic Dictionary. Following his resignation from the St. Petersburg Military Medical Academy, he published during the period 1897–1908 nearly 250 popular articles on a variety of topics. In these publications, Tarkhanov discussed many exciting problems of the time, such as health, hygiene, and nutrition of the people, issues of education of children and women, the organization of women's higher medical education in Russia, and radiation safety. He appears through his writings as a progressive humanist scholar, struggling for justice in all areas of public life and many others. His great capacity for work, which could not be reflected negatively in his health, is amazing.

Ivan R. Tarkhanov played an important role in Russian and European physiology. During his research and relatively short life, he established a school of physician-investigators of various specialties. From this school emerged eminent physiologists, including V. Y. Chagovets (1873–1941), B. F. Werigo (1860–1925), V. I. Vartanov (1853–1919), N. Cybulski (1854–1919), and V. K. Anrep (1852–1927). At the same time, Tarkhanov holds a special place in the history of Georgia, Georgian culture, and education. He was the first Georgian physiologist before Ivane Beritashvili, who was himself the second outstanding Georgian physiologist from the Russian physiological school. Tarkhanov (Tarkhnishvili) was one of those bridges, through which the people of Georgia joined with the best Russian and European science and culture, in searching for more advanced education, social progress, and independence.

== See also ==
Maria Manaseina

== Selected publications ==
- Tarchanoff, J.R. Über die Bildung von Gallenpigment aus Blutfarbstoff im Thierkörper. Pflüg. Arch. ges. Phys., 1874, Bd. 9, 53-65.
- Tarchanoff, J.R. Du rôle des vaisseaux capillaries dans la circulation. Compt. rend. Soc. de Biol. 1875, vol. 26, T. I, Sec. 6, 331-333.
- Tarchanoff, J.R. Etude sur les centre psychomoteur des animaux nouveau - nès et sur leur dèveloppments dans différentes conditions. Compt. rend. Soc. de Biol. 1878, vol. 30, 217-221.
- Tarchanoff, J.R. Über die willkürliche Acceleration der Herzschläge beim Menschen. Pflüg. Arch. ges. Phys., 1885, Bd. 35, 109-137.
- Tarchanoff, J.R. Zur Phisiologie des Geschlechtsapparates des Frosches. Pflüg. Arch. ges. Physiol., 1887, .Bd. 40, 330-351.
- Tarchanoff, J.R. Décharges èlectrique dans la peau de l'homme sous l'influence de l'excitation des organes des sens et de differentes formes d'activitè psychique. Compt. rend. Soc. de Biol. 1889, vol. 41, 447-451.
- Tarchanoff, J.R. Hypnotisme, suggestion et lecture des pensèes. (Trad. par E. Jaubert). 1-er èd., Paris, 1891; II-me èd., Paris, 1893, Masson. 164 pp.
- Tarchanoff, J.R. Quelques observations sur le sommeil normal. Arch. Italiennes de Biologie, 1894, vol. 21, 318-321.
- Tarchanoff, J.R. Influence de la musique sur l'homme et sur les animaux. Arch. Italiennes de Biologie, 1894, vol. 21, 313-317.
- Tarkhanov, I.R. Experiments upon the action of Roentgen's X-rays on organisms. Izvestya. St.-Peterb. Biol. Lab., 1896, no.3, 47-52. (in Russian)
- Tarchanoff, J.R. Actions physiologiques des tubes de Crookes à distance. Compt. rend. Soc. de Biol. 1897, vol. 49, 740-743.
- Tarchanoff, I. "Dècapitation". Dictionnaire de Physiologie, Ch. Rischet, 1898/1899, Paris, Baillièr, 681-691.
- Tarkhanov, I.R. Soul and Body. 1904, St.-Petersburg, 176 pp. (in Russian)
- Tarchanoff, J.R. et Moldenhauer, T. Sur la radio-activitè induite et naturelle des plantes et sur son rôle probable dans la croissance des plantes. Bull. Int. L'acad. Sci. Cracovie. 1905, no.1, 728-734.
- Cybulski N. et Tarchanoff I. A propose des poisons normaux de l'intestine. Arch. Int. Physiol., 1907, vol. 5, 257-261.
