= Northern Flowers =

Russian-language literary almanac

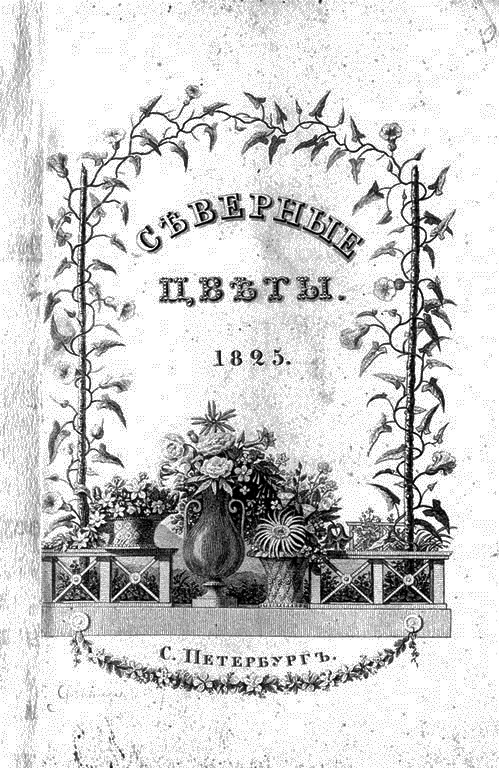
- Northern Flowers title page, 1825
- Editor: Anton Delvig; Alexander Pushkin
- Frequency: Yearly
- Founded: 1825
- Final issue: 1832
- Country: Russia
- Based in: St. Petersburg
- Language: Russian

Northern Flowers (Russian: Северные цветы, romanized: Severnyye tsvety) was a Russian-language literary almanac published yearly in Saint Petersburg from 1825 to 1832. The full title in Russian was Северные цветы, собранные бароном Дельвигом (Northern flowers, collected by baron Delvig. The main editors were Anton Delvig and Alexander Pushkin.
