= Yekaterina Yezhova =

Yekaterina Ivanovna Yezhova (Russian: Екатерина Ивановна Ежова, 1787–1837) was a Russian Empire stage actress. She was a leading celebrated star at the Imperial Theatre of Saint Petersburg in 1805–1837 and also a salon hostess, known for her relationship with Prince Alexander Shakhovskoy.
