= Aleksandr Gradovsky =

Russian jurist (1841–1889)

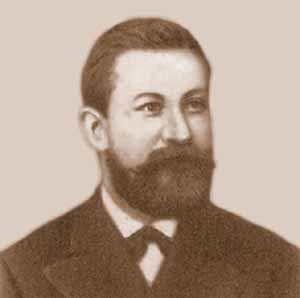
Aleksandr Gradovsky

Aleksandr Gradovsky (1841–1889) was a Russian jurist. A professor of law at St. Petersburg University since 1869, he was a leading theorist of Russian administrative and constitutional law. He was succeeded by Nikolay Korkunov.
