= Varvara Asenkova =

Russian actress (1817–1841)

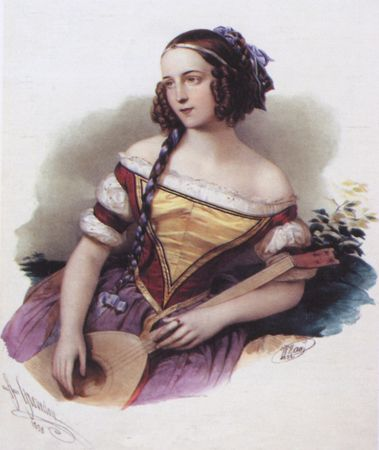
Асенкова

Varvara Asenkova (c. 1817–1841) was a Russian stage actress. She was engaged at the Imperial Theatres in 1835–1841, during which she had a successful career and referred to as the elite of her profession of her generation, noted particularly in heroine parts.
