= Nymphodora Semenova =

Russian opera singer (1787–1876)

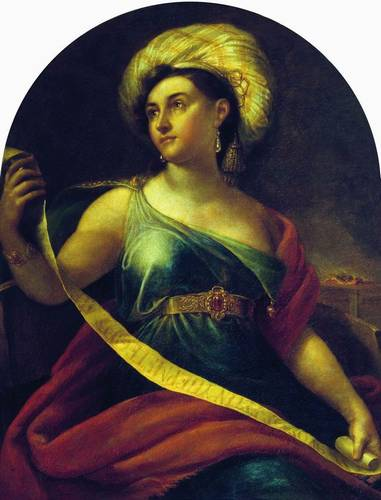
Semenova by Kiprenskiy as Sybil

Nymphodora Semenova (1787–1876), was a Russian opera singer. She was engaged at the Imperial Theatres in 1807–1828, during which she had a successful career and referred to as the elite of her profession of her generation. She was the sister of Ekaterina Semenova.
