= Alexey Olenin =

Russian archaeologist and curator (1763–1843)

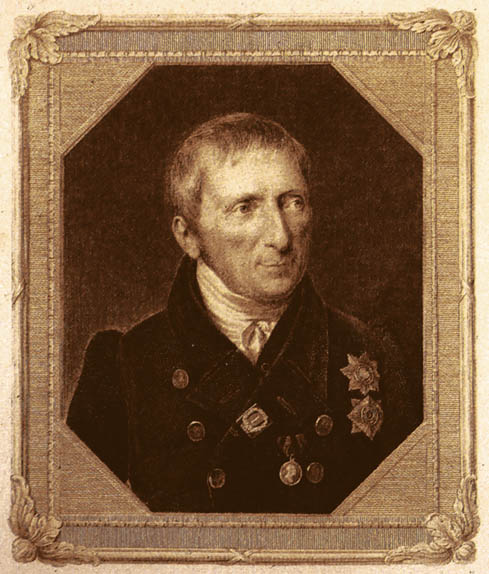
Alexey Olenin in 1836, by Nikolai Utkin, after Franz Krüger.

Alexey Nikolayevich Olenin (Aleksey Nikolaevich Olenin, Russian: Алексе́й Никола́евич Оле́нин; 9 December [O.S. 28 November] 1763 in Moscow – 29 April [O.S. 17 April] 1843 in Saint Petersburg) was a Russian archaeologist, most notable for being a director of the Imperial Public Library between 1811 and 1843 and the sixth president of the Imperial Academy of Arts between 1817 and 1843.

== Early life ==
Olenin was born into a noble family in Moscow. He received his initial education at home. Then in 1774, as was customary at the time among Russian aristocracy, he was enrolled in the Corps of Pages. In 1780 he was sent to study history and art history in Dresden.

== Career ==
In 1785 Olenin returned to Russia to start a military career. In parallel he was writing a dictionary of military quotations and in 1786 he was elected to the St Petersburg Academy of Sciences, even though the dictionary had not yet been published. In December 1786 Olenin quit military service, but in 1789 he rejoined the army. He was sent to Pskov and subsequently, in 1789—1790, participated in the Russo-Swedish war. In 1795 he was promoted to the rank of colonel and retired from military service for good.

After 1795 Olenin was employed on a variety of civil positions, including director of the Saint Petersburg Mint (1799). In 1811 he was appointed director of the Imperial Public Library.

From 1794 he took a keen interest in art, in particular, produced a number of graphic works, and formed a large collection of antiquities, which he later (in 1829) donated to the Academy of Arts. He went on to illustrate a number of books, including the selected works of Gavrila Derzhavin and a book of fables by Ivan Khemnitser. In 1804 he was elected a member of the Academy of Arts. In 1806 Olenin published his first scholarly paper, A letter to Prince Musin-Pushkin on the stone of Tmutarakan found at the island of Taman in 1792, in which he deciphered the inscription on the stone. Because of this paper, Olenin is regarded as a founder of Russian palaeography. He is also notable for being the host of one of the most fashionable salons in Saint Petersburg, which attracted many authors, artists, musicians, and actors.

Alexander Pushkin, considered to be the most famous Russian poet, was romantically involved with Anna Olenina, Alexey Olenin's youngest daughter. He wrote a number of poems to her, and even proposed to her in 1828, but was rejected outright. Anna Olenina did not marry until 1840.

== Death ==
Alexey Olenin died in Saint Petersburg in 1843, still in office, and was buried in the Alexander Nevsky Lavra.

== Sources ==
- "Оленин, Александр Николаевич" . Brockhaus and Efron Encyclopedic Dictionary (in Russian). 1906.
