= List of post-Roman triumphal arches =

This is a list of post-Roman triumphal arches. Since the Renaissance period, rulers and states have sought to glorify themselves or commemorate victories by erecting triumphal arches on the Roman model. Modern arches have ranged from temporary structures of wood and plaster set up to celebrate royal entries to large permanent stone structures built in prominent places in city centres. They have been built around the world in a variety of styles, ranging from conscious imitations of Roman arches to more loose interpretations influenced by local architectural styles.

Image	Name	Date	City	Country
	Taq-e Zafar (Arch of Victory)	1928	Paghman	Afghanistan
	Arch of Victory on the Avenue of Honour	1917	Ballarat	Australia
	Arches of the Cinquantenaire	1905	Brussels	Belgium
	Sebastopol Monument	1860	Halifax	Canada
	Princes' Gates	1927	Toronto	Canada
	British Arch	1911	Valparaíso	Chile
	Porte d'Aix	1823–1839	Marseille	France
	Porte du Peyrou	1693	Montpellier	France
	Arc de Triomphe	1806–1836	Paris	France
	Arc de Triomphe du Carrousel	1806–1808	Paris	France
	Porte Saint-Denis	1672	Paris	France
	Porte Saint-Martin	1674	Paris	France
	Porte Héré	1755	Nancy	France
	Porte de Paris	1692	Lille	France
	Porte Désilles	1782–1784	Nancy	France
	Brandenburg Gate	1788–1791	Berlin	Germany
	Siegestor	1852	Munich	Germany
	Arch 22	1996	Banjul	The Gambia
	Stone Gate	1764	Vác	Hungary
	Arco dos Vice-Reis	1597	Old Goa, Goa	India
	Gateway of India	1924	Mumbai	India
	India Gate	1921	New Delhi	India
	Victory Arch (Swords of Qādisīyah)	1989	Baghdad	Iraq
	Fusiliers' Arch	1907	Dublin	Ireland
	Arco di Trionfo di Castel Nuovo	1471	Naples	Italy
	Arco a Margherita Teresa di Spagna	1666	Finale Ligure	Italy
	Arco a Carlo Alberto di Savoia	1836	Finale Ligure	Italy
	Arco di Trionfo Umberto I King of Italy, known as Bastione di St. Remy	1901	Cagliari	Italy
	Porta Nuova	1669	Palermo	Italy
	Porta Garibaldi	1768	Catania	Italy
	Triumphal Arch of the Lorraine	1737	Florence	Italy
	Arco monumentale all'Arma di Artiglieria	1930	Turin	Italy
	Arco di trionfo	1768	Alessandria	Italy
	Monumento alla Vittoria	1928	Bolzano	Italy
	Porta Napoli	1548	Lecce	Italy
	Arco della Pace	1807–1838	Milan	Italy
	Porta Garibaldi	1826–1828	Milan	Italy
	Arco della Vittoria	1931	Genoa	Italy
	Mäñgilik El Triumphal Arch	2011	Astana	Kazakhstan
	Patuxai	1957–1968	Vientiane	Laos
	Porta Macedonia	2012	Skopje	North Macedonia
	De Rohan Arch	1798	Żebbuġ	Malta
	Wignacourt Arch	1615 (rebuilt 2015)	Birkirkara/Santa Venera	Malta
	Arcul de Triumf (Chișinău)	1840	Chișinău	Moldova
	Arch of Triumph (Pyongyang)	1982	Pyongyang	North Korea
	Arco da Porta Nova	1512	Braga	Portugal
	Arco de São Bento	1758	Lisbon	Portugal
	Rua Augusta Arch	1755–1873	Lisbon	Portugal
	Portas da Cidade	1783	Ponta Delgada	Portugal
	Arcul de Triumf (Bucharest)	1936	Bucharest	Romania
	Red Gate	1753	Moscow	Russia
	Poklonnaya Hill Arch	1829	Moscow	Russia
	Arches of Triumph	1817	Novocherkassk	Russia
	Narva Triumphal Gate	1827–1834	Saint Petersburg	Russia
	Dongnimmun Arch (Independence Gate)	1898	Seoul	South Korea
	Arc de Triomf	1888	Barcelona	Spain
	Arco de Santa María	1536–1553	Burgos	Spain
	Arco de la Victoria	1950	Madrid	Spain
	Puerta de Alcalá	1769	Madrid	Spain
	Puerta de Toledo	1813	Madrid	Spain
	Puerta de San Vicente	1775	Madrid	Spain
	Triumphal arches for the arrival of Isabel II to Seville	1862	Seville	Spain
	The Corinthian Arch	1765	Stowe House	United Kingdom
	Marble Arch	1828	London	United Kingdom
	Wellington Arch	1826–1830	London	United Kingdom
	Admiralty Arch	1906–1912	London	United Kingdom
	Millennium Gate	2005–2008	Atlanta, Georgia	United States
	Victory Arch, Bywater, New Orleans	1919	New Orleans	United States
	Washington Square Arch	1890–1892	New York City	United States
	Dewey Arch	1899–1900	New York City	United States
	Manhattan Bridge Arch	1915	New York City	United States
	Atlantic & Pacific Arches, National World War II Memorial	2002	Washington, D.C.	United States
	Soldiers' and Sailors' Arch	1889–1892	New York City	United States
	Carabobo Triumphal Arch	1921	Valencia	Venezuela
	The Simpang Lima Gumul Monument	2003–2007	Kediri Regency	Indonesia

== See also ==
- List of Roman triumphal arches
- Memorial gates and arches
- Some examples on this page are also city gates, like e.g. the Brandenburg Gate
