= Stepan Pimenov =

Russian sculptor (1784–1833)

- Степан Пименов
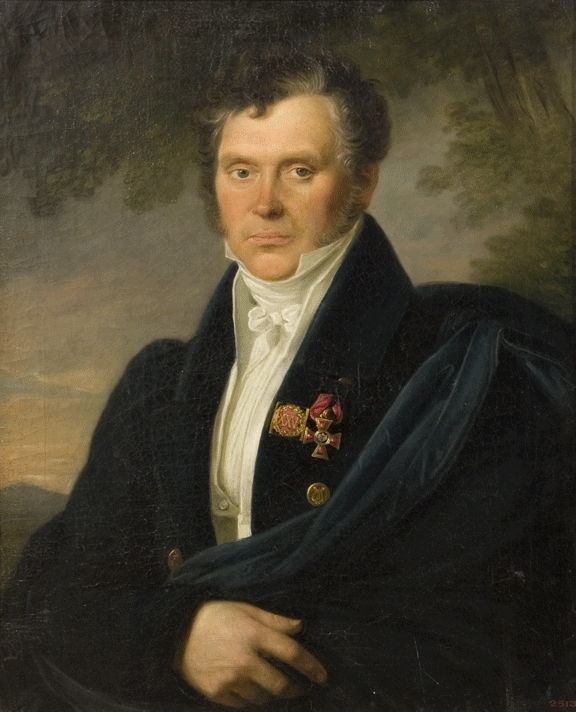
- Born: 1784; Saint Petersburg, Russia
- Died: 3 April [O.S. 22 March] 1833 (aged 49); Saint Petersburg, Russia
- Resting place: Tikhvin Cemetery
- Education: Imperial Academy of Arts
- Known for: Sculpture

Stepan Stepanovich Pimenov (Russian: Степан Степанович Пименов; 1784 – 3 April [O.S. 22 March] 1833) was a Russian artist and sculptor. He was closely associated with Vasily Demut-Malinovsky, with whom he worked on the decoration of buildings designed by Carlo Rossi and Andrey Voronikhin. He was an academician of the Imperial Academy of Arts from 1807, and a full professor from 1814.

Born in 1784, Pimenov attended the Imperial Academy of Arts and distinguished himself there, winning several medals for his artistic compositions. Graduating in 1803, he was soon involved in an important commission, working with several other famous sculptors and artists on Andrey Voronikhin's project for the Kazan Cathedral. Making his name with two particular sculptures, Pimenov became an academician and went on to teach at the Academy. He combined his teaching duties with carrying out important commissions, and also worked as a designer at the Imperial Porcelain Factory. He co-operated with Voronikhin and Demut-Malinovsky once more on the decoration of the Mining Institute, and worked on Andreyan Zakharov's Admiralty building. He began an enduring relationship with architect Carlo Rossi in the late 1810s, producing works for the Yelagin and Mikhailovsky Palaces, and the General Staff Building.

Towards the end of his life Pimenov continued to carry out large commissions, his works adorned the Alexandrinsky Theatre and the Imperial Public Library. While working on compositions for Vasily Stasov's Narva Triumphal Arch in the early 1830s, he came into conflict with Emperor Nicholas I, supposedly over Pimenov's portraits of Nicholas and his wife Alexandra Feodorovna. Nicholas criticised Pimenov's characters for the Narva Arch and he was forced to resign from the Academy in 1830. He was able to complete several of his commissions before his death in 1833.

== Family and early life ==
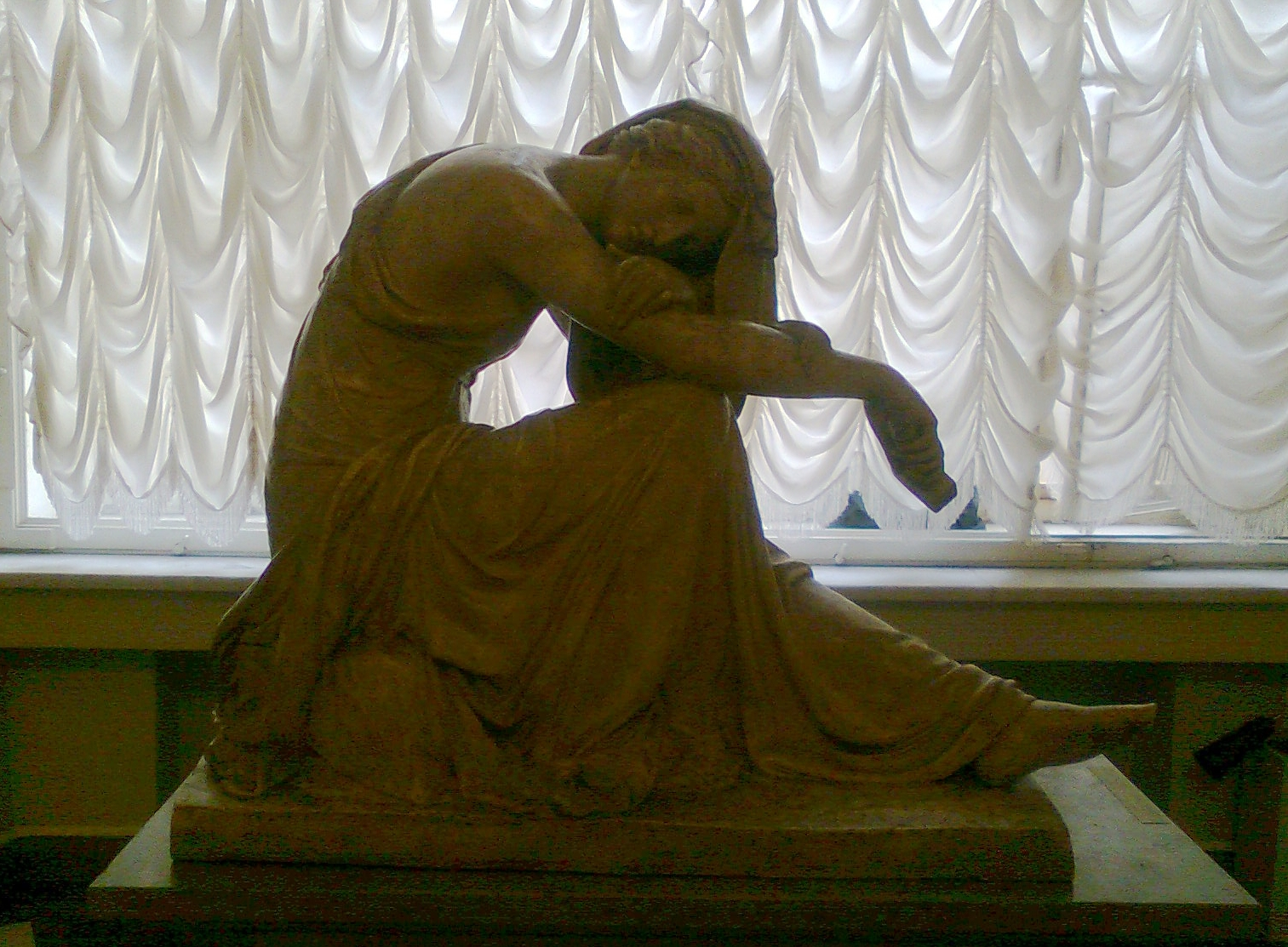
An example of Pimenov's early work, his design for Mikhail Kozlovsky's grave monument

Pimenov was born in Saint Petersburg in 1784. His father, Stepan Afanasyevich Pimenov, was a civil servant with the rank of provincial secretary. He entered the Imperial Academy of Arts in 1795 at the age of 11, studying under Mikhail Kozlovsky and Ivan Prokofiev. Pimenov received several awards during his studies, including a large silver medal in 1801 "for sculpting from life", a small gold medal in 1802 for his bas-relief composition "Jupiter and Mercury visiting Philemon and Baucis in the form of wanderers", and a large gold medal in the autumn of 1803 for his "Killing of Two Viking-Christians who refused to bow to Perun". In 1802 he took part in the competition to design a gravestone for his mentor, sculptor Mikhail Kozlovsky. It was won by a design by Vasily Demut-Malinovsky, with whom Pimenov would have collaborations and a friendly rivalry for many years to come. Pimenov received second place, his model in gypsum is now held by the Russian Museum. He graduated from the Academy in 1803 with his degree certificate, an honorary sword, and the title of an artist of the 14th class. Pimenov's academic credentials gave him the right to travel and live abroad, though with the international upheaval of the Napoleonic Wars he elected not to do so, eventually spending his whole life in Russia.

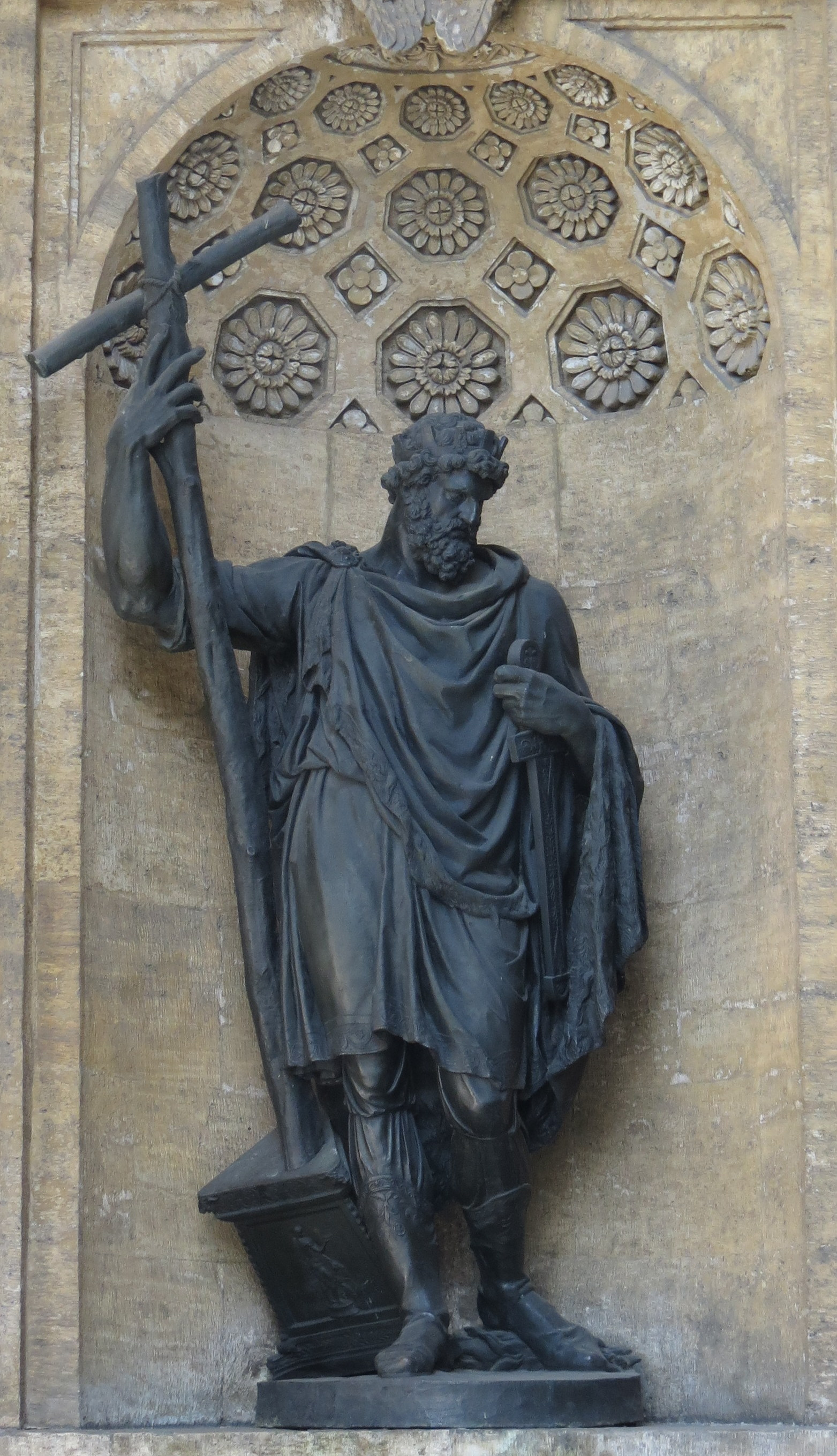
Kazan Cathedral: Pimenov's statue of Vladimir the Great, 1807

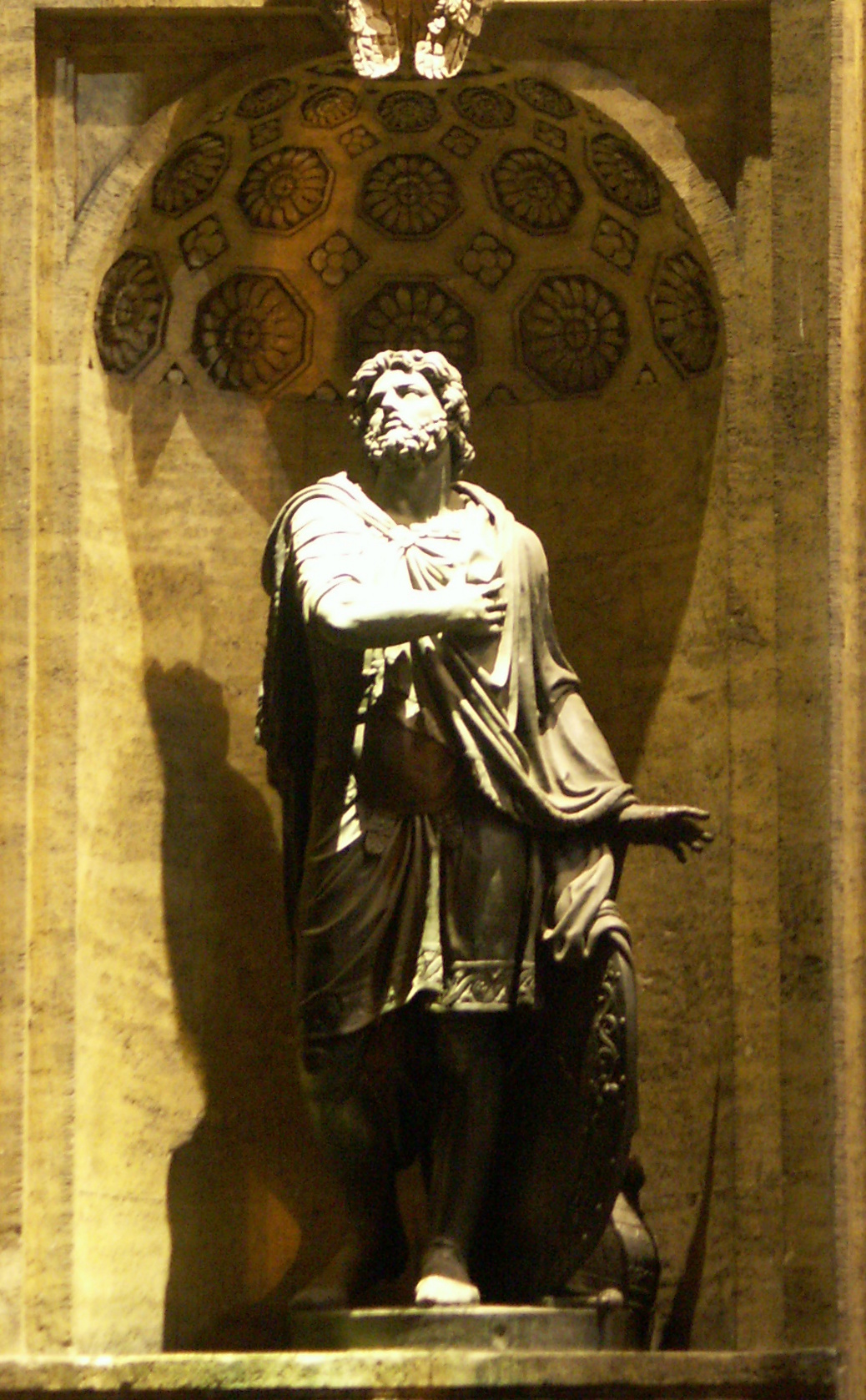
Kazan Cathedral: Pimenov's statue of Alexander Nevsky, 1811

In 1804 Pimenov joined Andrey Voronikhin's project for the Kazan Cathedral, producing a bronze statue of Vladimir the Great in 1807. Pimenov depicted Prince Vladimir as a militant and courageous leader, trampling on a pagan altar with a sword in one hand and a wooden cross in the other. With the successful completion of this commission, Pimenov was given the task of creating a statue of Alexander Nevsky for the cathedral, which had originally been entrusted to Feodosiy Shchedrin. Pimenov completed this statue in 1811, depicting Alexander Nevsky after his victory, lowering his shield, removing his armor and turning to the sky. With the consecration of the Kazan Cathedral in 1811, Pimenov was awarded a diamond ring for his work. The Academy elected him an academician in 1807 for his sculpture of Vladimir the Great and he was employed as a teacher at the Academy from 1809, becoming a professor in September 1814. His teaching career lasted for most of the rest of his life, retiring in 1830. He held his post at the Academy alongside a position with the Imperial Porcelain Factory, which he joined on 15 June 1809, creating designs for vases, dishes and statuettes. His work included the Guryevsky service, featuring figures of Russian girls and boys in national costumes. He was also responsible for small genre porcelain figurines based on Russian peasants. These included "Girl with a Yoke" and "Boy-Waterman", similar in style to the paintings of Alexey Venetsianov. Among his later works for the factory were "The transition of Russian troops across the Danube" and "The patronage of Russia of Moldova and Wallachia", created in 1829 in response to the Russo-Turkish War.

== Commissions ==
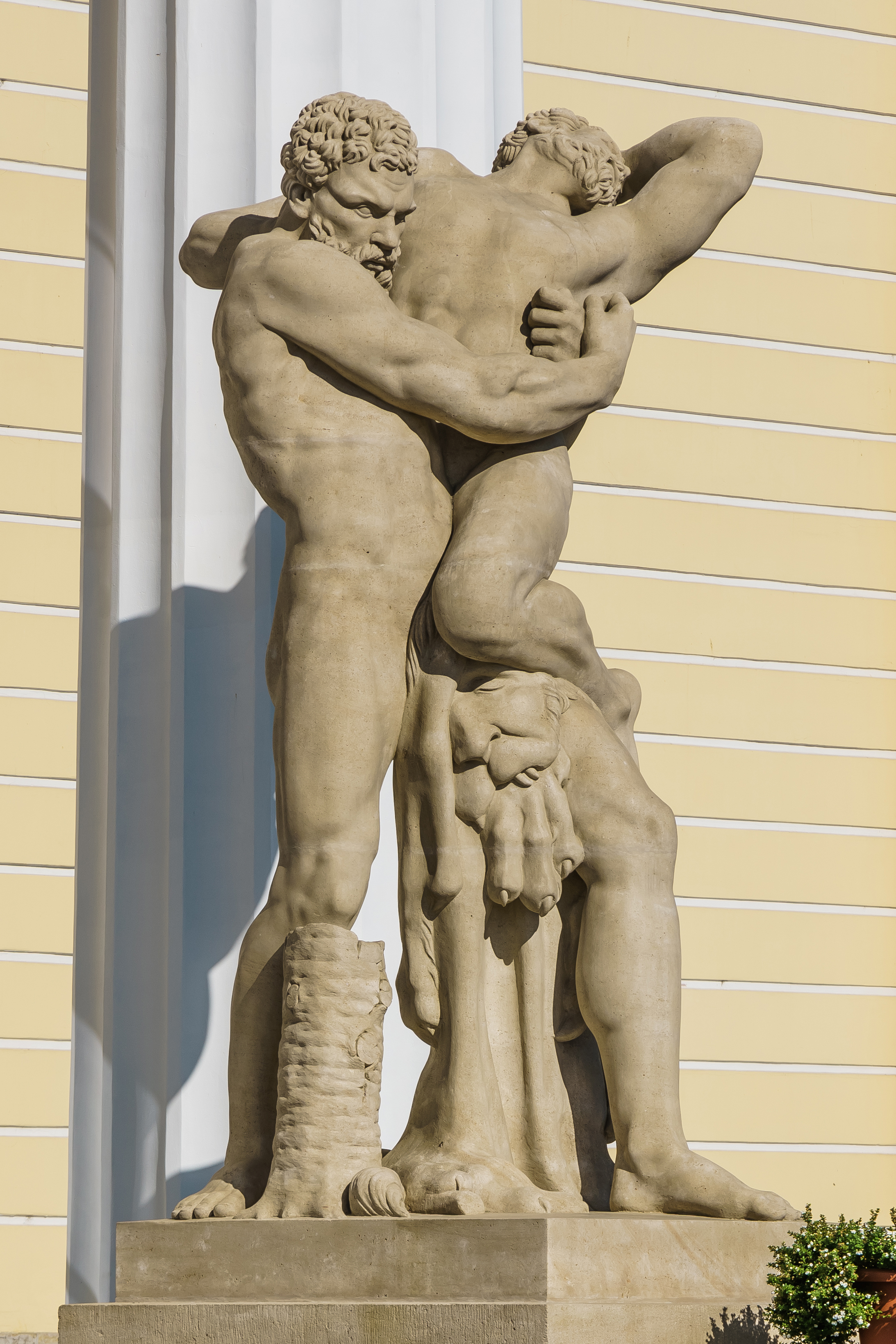
"Hercules and Antaeus", Pimenov's composition at the entrance to the Mining Institute

In 1809 Pimenov was again working with Voronikhin on the design and construction of the Mining Institute. The entrance portico was to be decorated with two sculptural groups at the corners of the staircase. "The Abduction of Proserpina" was executed by Demut-Malinovsky, and "Hercules and Antaeus" by Pimenov. In 1810 he sculpted the tombstone of Prince Mikhail Golitsyn for his grave in the Donskoy Monastery in Moscow. He also took part in the competition to design a monument to Minin and Pozharsky and created a number of busts. In 1815 he worked on the decorations for Andreyan Zakharov's Admiralty building, creating sixteen statues to serve as allegorical representations of elements and seasons - "Fire", "Summer", "Air", continents - "Asia", "America", and rivers - "Dnepr", "Neva". These statues were all lost in the 1860s when Emperor Alexander II ordered them removed and destroyed, apparently due to their being in a dilapidated state. From around 1817 Pimenov began working with architect Carlo Rossi, eventually producing a number of sculptures for his projects. An early collaboration was on the Anichkov Palace in 1817, with Pimenov sculpting warriors for the facades. Between 1819 and 1820 he worked with fellow sculptors Ivan Martos, Vasily Demut-Malinovsky and Ivan Prokofiev on a series of large plaster bas-reliefs to decorate the ceiling of the Academy of Arts. Pimenov was responsible for the bas-relief depicting "Painting".

Pimenov worked with Demut-Malinovsky and Rossi on several large commissions, producing works for the Yelagin and Mikhailovsky Palaces from 1818 onwards. In the Yelagin Palace Pimenov created statues for the facades of the kitchen building: bas-reliefs for the greenhouse and high-relief figures for the lobby. For the Mikhailovsky Palace his work included the composition of winged figures of Glory, trophies in the timpanas of the main facade and numerous reliefs above the ground floor windows. He also produced decorations for the interiors, though only caryatids in the gallery and bas-reliefs in the White Hall survive.

In 1827 Demut-Malinovsky and Pimenov sculpted decorations for the arch of Rossi's General Staff Building. Pimenov was particularly responsible for the chariot of Glory on the attic of the arch. Pimenov's later work included the chariot of Apollo for the Alexandrinsky Theatre between 1831 and 1832, and statues of Homer and Plato for the Imperial Public Library over the same period. In 1830 he had produced a similar composition to the General Staff Building's one for Vasily Stasov's Narva Triumphal Arch, but by this time he had fallen out of favour with Emperor Nicholas I, supposedly over Pimenov's portraits of Nicholas and his wife Alexandra Feodorovna. Nicholas criticised Pimenov's characters for the Narva Arch as being too thin, and ordered a new competition. Pimenov was forced to resign from the Academy, though he was still able to complete his design for the Arch, sculpting the figures of "Glory", and supporting characters in 1832.

== Family and death ==
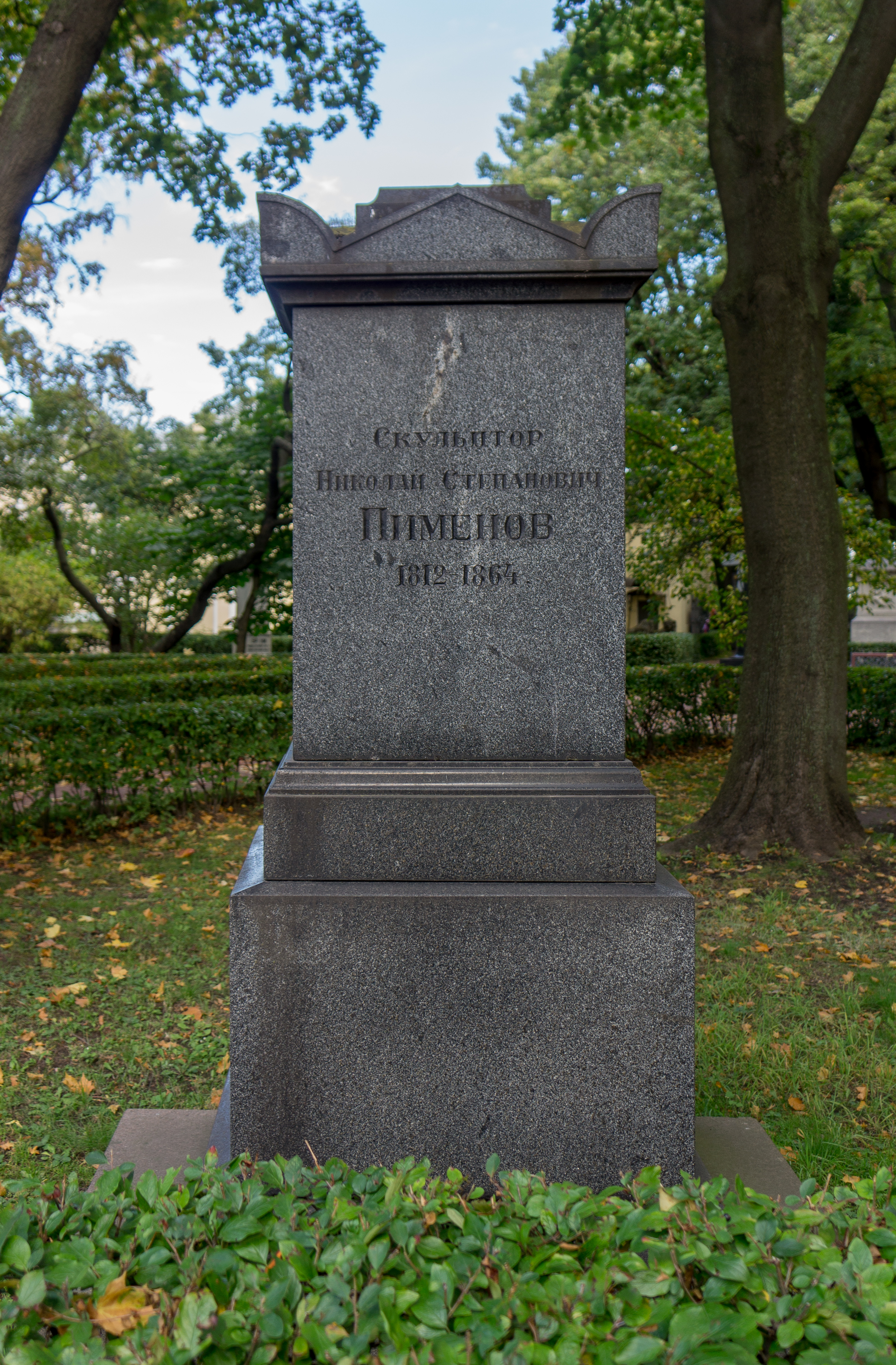
Pimenov's grave in Tikhvin Cemetery

Pimenov died on 3 April [O.S. 22 March] 1833 at the age of 49 and was buried in the Smolensky Cemetery. He had a daughter and two sons. The eldest son, Nikolai, also became a noted sculptor. In 1936 the remains of both Stepan and Nikolai Pimenov were reburied in the Tikhvin Cemetery of the Alexander Nevsky Lavra. In 1939 a granite altar-style tombstone was erected to the two Pimenovs.
