= Simpang Lima Gumul Monument =

Monument in Kediri Regency, East Java, Indonesia

- Monumen Simpang Lima Gumul
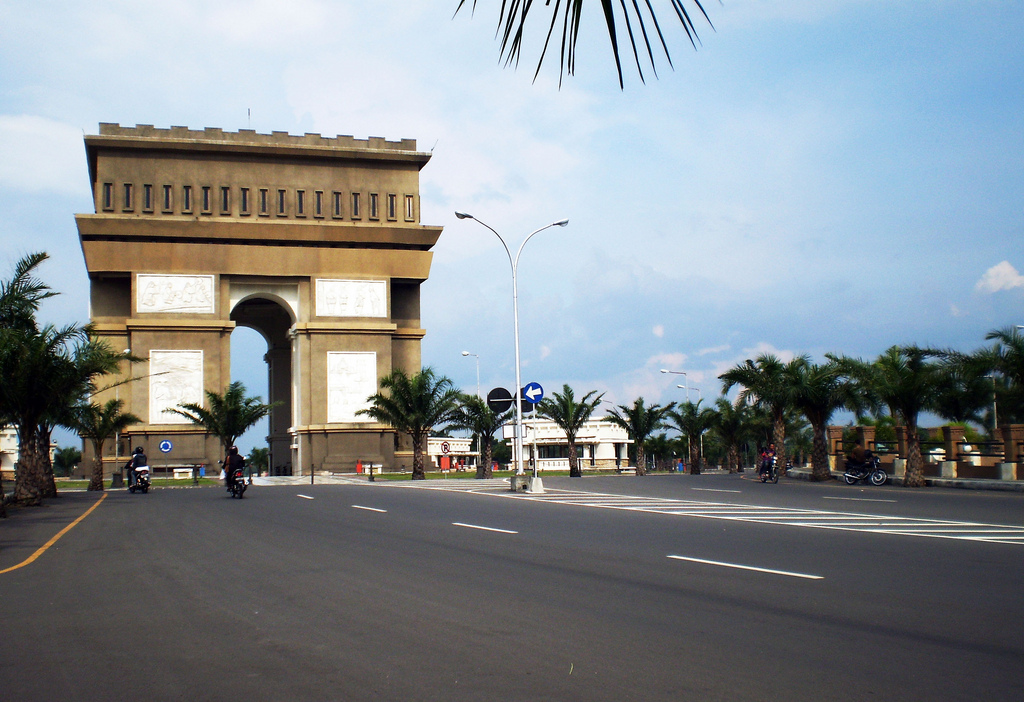
- Interactive map of Simpang Lima Gumul Monument
- Location: Tugurejo, District of Ngasem, Regency of Kediri, East Java, Indonesia
- Coordinates: 7.816050°S 112.062850°E
- Builder: Government of Kediri Regency
- Type: Triumphal Arch
- Height: 25 m (82 ft)
- Beginning date: 2003
- Completion date: 2008
- Dedicated to: The New Administrative Capital of Kediri

The Simpang Lima Gumul Monument (Indonesian: Monumen Simpang Lima Gumul) or commonly abbreviated as SLG is a monument at Kediri, East Java in Indonesia. The monument resembles the Arc de Triomphe of Paris, France. Construction of SLG began in 2003 and was inaugurated in 2008. The building is located at Tugurejo, District of Ngasem, Kediri Regency, precisely at the center of the meeting of five roads ("Lima" means five) that lead to Central City of Kediri, District of Pagu, District of Pare, District of Plosoklaten, and District of Pesantren.

Aside from being an icon, SLG is currently also a center of the new economy and trade (Central Business District or CBD) of Kediri Regency.

== Building characteristics ==
The monument has a land area of 37 hectares. The building of the monument has floor area 804 square meters and a height of 25 meters consisting of 6 floors, and is lined with 3 stairs 3 meters high from the ground floor. The number and height of the monument reflect the date, month and year of the anniversary of Kediri Regency, namely March 25, 804 AD. On the side of the monument carved reliefs that depict the history of Kediri to the arts and culture that exist today.

In one corner of the monument there is a statue (statue) of Ganesha, one of the gods that is widely worshiped by Hindus with the title of the God of Knowledge and Intelligence, the Protector God, the Rejection God, the God of Wisdom.

The Simpang Lima Gumul Monument is located in a strategic area and is equipped with a variety of public facilities, such as convention hall, multipurpose building, regional bank, intercity bus terminal and MPU (General Passenger Car), temporary markets (open at certain times) Saturday and Sunday and recreational facilities such as Gumul Paradise Island Water Park. Inside the monument building there are spaces for meetings in the main building and auditorium in the upper floor which are roof-like (dome) roofed, multipurpose room in the basement (basement), and minimarkets that sell various souvenirs in downstairs. The building also has three underground access roads to go to the monument.

== See also ==
List of post-Roman triumphal arches
