= Totok Kerot =

Ogress in Javanese folk tales

Totok Kerot, Thothok Kerot, or Thothokkêrot Javanese pronunciation: [ʈɔʈɔʔ kərɔt] is a female character in folk tales, spread among people in the surrounding areas of Kediri. There are several different tales concerning her, but the common features are that she has ugly face, with appearance like butâ (Jav. "giant" or "ogre").

Local tradition connects the character with a statue, commonly called Rêcâ Thothokkêrot, found in Kediri Regency. Some tales connect Thothokkerot to the legend of Calon Arang. Others have no connection whatsoever to the legend. Some tales about her is related here.

== Thothokkerot and Princess Limaran ==
Thotokkerot was an ugly ogress. She longed the love of Raden Putra of Kediri. She loved to make up her face in order to charm the prince. Every day, she came to a pond to use the water's surface as a mirror.

One day, she was astounded to find that the face she saw in the water was extremely beautiful. Unable to believe her own eyes, she took an earthen bucket of water and looked at her reflection in that water. She saw the same familiar face she had already known. Again she looked into the pond, only to find the beautiful face. Feeling mocked, she kicked the bucket into pieces. She looked into the pond once more, and there she saw the beautiful face.

At last, she was convinced that gods had granted her wish to have a beautiful face. Enamoured, she started to dance, expressing her feelings towards Raden Putra, and sang out her love for him. However, her dance was jerky and ridiculous and her voice was not pleasant to hear either.

After a little while, she heard a giggle from above her. She looked up, and there she saw the beautiful face she had seen before. A young girl was climbing on a branch of tree above her. Now she was aware that the beautiful face did not belong to her, but to the young girl. Apparently the young girl had observed her for a while. After she danced and sang, the girl could not help laughing seeing her.

Thothokkerot was furious. She rocked the tree exuberantly. Dry leaves and flowers and old twigs and branches fell apart. Terrified, the young girl climbed down the tree, and sat in front of her. Later, it was revealed that she was Limaran, a princess from nearby kingdom. Thothokkerot picked up the fallen flowers and put a handful of them on her head. Then she put a flower on the princess' head.

A young shepherd passed by. Thothokkerot asked him which one of them was more beautiful. He answered spontaneously that the princess was more beautiful even with only a flower on her head, as if the flower was a lone bright star.

Afterwards, Thothokkerot exchanged the flower arrangement, now she wore only one flower. Again she asked the boy who was more beautiful. This time the shepherd answered that with a pile of flowers on the princess' head she looked like a bright full moon. Hearing his answers, Thothokkerot was angry, and she roared to the princess and the shepherd. Frightened, they ran away.

== Thothokkerot as Butå Nyai ==
Once upon a time there was an ogress who wanted to marry Prabu Jåyåbåyå. She then went to the capital of Daha. Her arrival caused chaos because citizens of the capital had never seen an ogress before. Before she could utter a word about her intention, people ran riot and beat her to near death. Dying, she managed to tell her name, Nyai, and her homeland, Lodhoyong, in the region of the Southern Sea. She claimed that her intention was to serve the king (a euphemism of marriage). Hearing her words, the soldiers went as fast as possible to report to the king.

King Jayabaya came and listened to her wish directly, and then said, "It is pity that the gods have not granted your wish yet. However, I am giving you a clue to the solution of your problem. About twenty years from now, you will find a kingdom named Prambana, to the west from here. Its king will be a man whose name is Prawatasari. He will be the one who is destined to be your spouse."

And so the ogress passed away. Touched by this incident, the king gave order to the people. The village south of Mênang (capital of Daha) should be renamed 'Gumuruh' because there was a loud noise when people lynched the ogress. The people made also a giant statue that resembled the appearance of the ogress.

The place where the statue was erected is at present near a district called 'Gurah' and the statue is called 'Rêca Nyai', now more commonly known as 'Rêca Totokkerot'.

== Thothokkerot as Princess Surèngrånå ==
Prabu Lembuamiluhur, king of Jenggala, had four siblings. The eldest was Princess Kilisuci. She did not marry and lived as a hermit on Mount Pucangan, and sometimes on Klothok Hill (at Cave Selåmangleng). The others were Lembumerdhadhu, king of Kedhiri, Lembungarang, king of Ngurawan, and Lembumerjaya, king of Pånårågå. Those five siblings were Prabu Sri Gentayu's children.

Lembuamiluhur's son, Panji Yudåwisrenggå, also known as Panji Jåyåkusumå, was betrothed to Princess Candrakirana, also known as Galuh or Sekartaji, daughter of Lembumerdhadhu. However, the engagement was broken because Panji fell in love with Princess Anggraèni, daughter of the Patih of Jenggala, and then got married. By Lembuamiluhur's order, Panji would have to marry Candrakirana even though he was already married to Anggraèni, but Panji refused to marry a woman he did not love. With a cunning plot, Anggraèni was murdered so Panji's love might be diverted to Candrakirana, but Panji still refused and grieved over his passing wife. His father got furious, and then Panji escaped from the palace.

Panji journeyed to Ngurawan, to his uncle Lembupengarang's court. His uncle accepted his presence with sympathy. For months he stayed there, Panji got close to his cousin, Surèngrånå, Lembupengarang's eldest daughter. Eventually he married her.

Meanwhile, a king from overseas came to Kediri to ask for Candrakirana's hand. His proposal was denied. Feeling insulted, the foreign king wage war against Kediri. Kediri's troops was overwhelmed, but then saved by the arrival of support armies from Jenggala, Ngurawan, and Pånårågå. The foreign king's troops were repelled.

After the war Kilisuci came to Kediri to talk about Candrakirana. She suggested that the root of the war was Candrakirana. He thought so because many foreign kings also asked for her hand. As long as she remained unmarried, the possibility of such previous war still existed. Therefore, she insisted to marry Candrakirana to Panji, even though he was married to another cousin of Candrakirana's. It was even suggested that the marriage would strengthen the unity of the three kingdoms of their family.

Lembumerdhadhu (Panji's father) gave Kilisuci consent to arrange such marriage. Lembupengarang did not have the heart to talk such proposal to his daughter, so he asked Kilisuci to talk to her.

Deep inside her heart, Surèngrånå could not accept such proposal. Although she would still be the first wife, Candrakirana is more senior both in age and familial relationship. She accepted nonetheless, because she was afraid of Kilisuci. She came to hide her real feelings, her hatred and jealousy towards Candrakirana.

It was her jealousy and hatred that later gave her the nickname 'Totok Kerot'. Although she tried to hide her feelings, her face still showed hints of them (Javanese: methothok) and she ground her teeth (Javanese: kerot-kerot) every time she saw Candrakirana's face.

== Reca Thothokkerot ==
Rêcâ Thothokkerot Javanese pronunciation: [rətʃɔ ʈɔʈɔʔ kərɔt] is a statue (Jav. rêcâ means "statue") located in Kediri Regency, Indonesia about 2 kilometers north-east of Simpang Lima Gumul. It is made of andesite stone, depicting a giant with a terrifying face. It kneels on one knee. The style is of a dvarapala. Based on the style, it is suggested that it was made in the 10th century.

The face and other ornaments suggest that it a representation of a female butâ.

Local traditions connect the statue Thothokkerot to the character in the folk tales, hence also to Calon Arang, but such connection refuted by Timoer (1982).

== See also ==
- Kediri Regency
- Panji (prince)
- Jayabaya
