= Arches of Triumph (Novocherkassk) =

Monuments of Russian Classicist architecture

Coordinates: 47°25′38″N 40°05′48″E

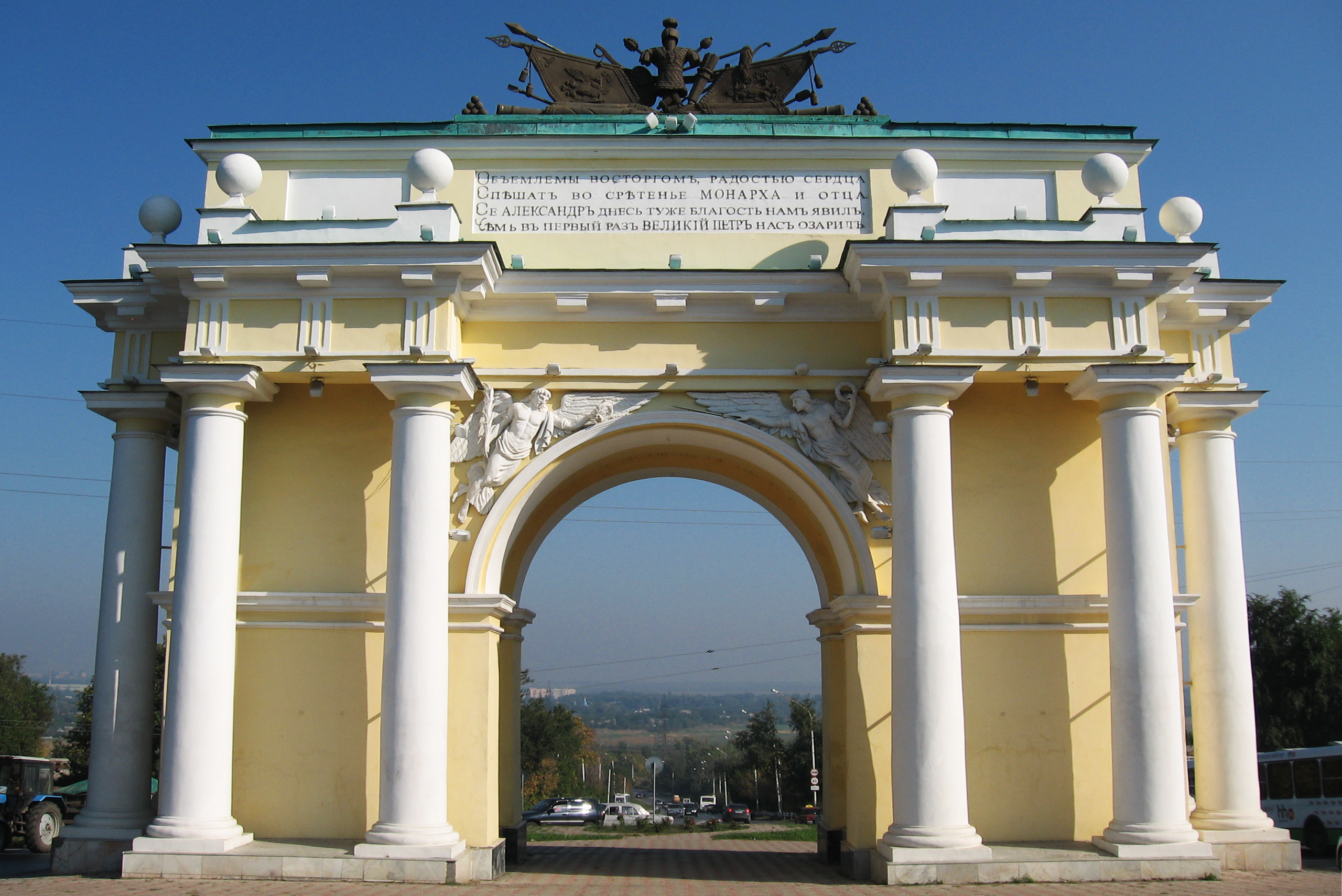
The Northern Triumphal Arch

Arches of Triumph in Novocherkassk (Russian: Триумфальные арки Новочеркасска) are monuments of Russian Classicist architecture. The monumental complex consists of two triumphal arches western and northern, situated respectively in the south-west and north of Novocherkassk. Built in 1817 to commemorate the victory in the Patriotic War of 1812, they symbolize the military contribution of the Don Cossacks in the struggle against Napoleon. The only triumphal gates in Southern Russia are officially declared objects of cultural heritage of federal significance.

== Architecture ==
Two identical arches were built in the style of late classicism and were designed by Luigi Rusca. A massive pylon of each of the two is cut by an arched opening and decorated with a strict paneled belt. The entourage of a powerful Doric order is supported by twelve columns. Each column is topped with a small ledge and a stone ball. Plastically integral in parts and details, the volume of arches is topped by an attic. The ensemble of the northern arch is crowned by bronze military armor from the trophies: mails, flags, sabers, shields and guns. In combination with the figures of Gloria flying above the arches, armor strengthens the special memorial sound of the monument.

The surface of the arches, including the attic, is plastered and painted in a yellow-white color. The Novocherkassk arches served as a prototype for the Narva Triumphal Arch in St. Petersburg, which was built in 1833 as the project of the architect Vasily Stasov.

== See also ==
- List of post-Roman triumphal arches
