= The State Hermitage Youth Education Center =

Contemporary art centre in Saint Petersburg, Russia

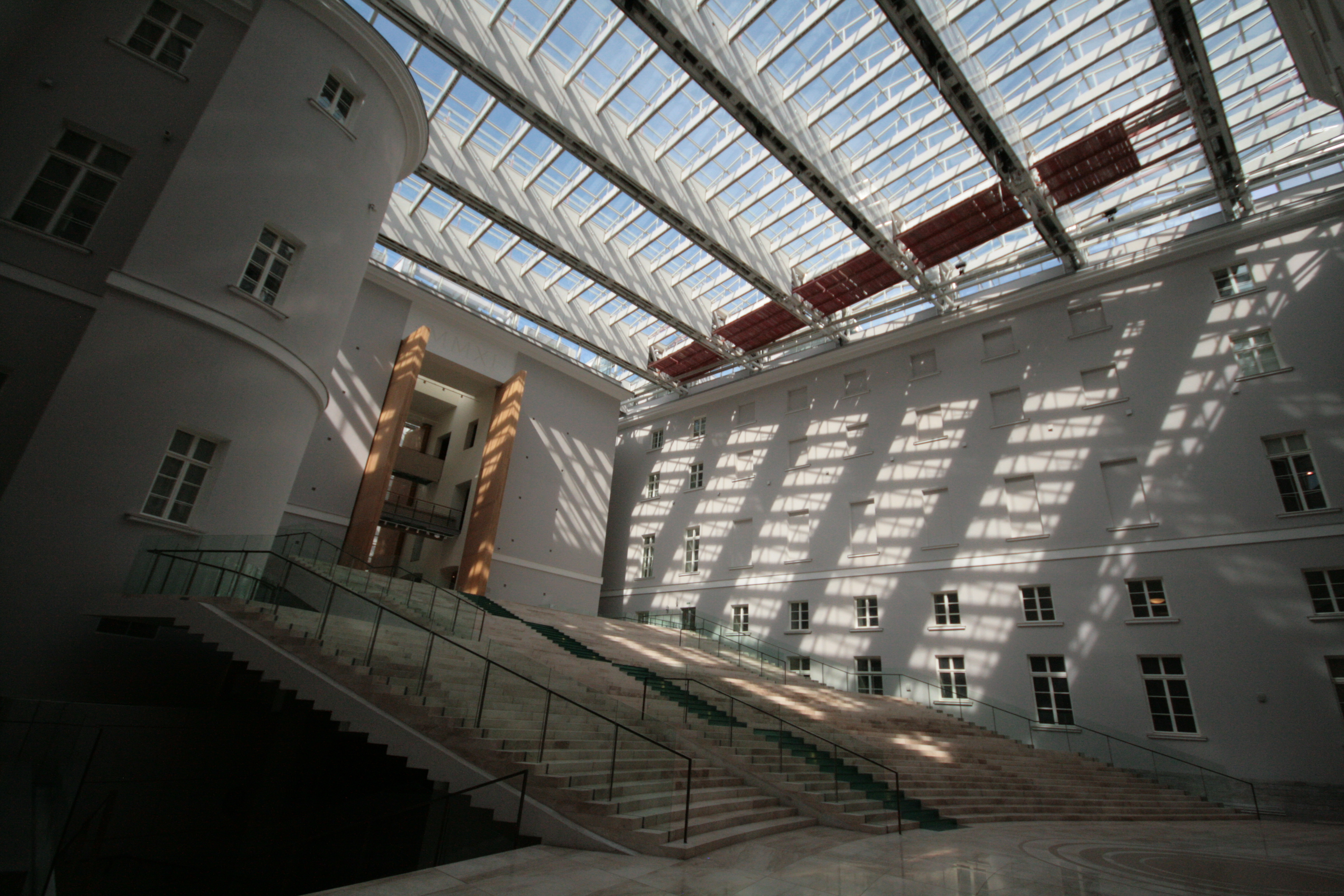

Location
- Coordinates: 59°56′25″N 30°18′50″E

The State Hermitage Youth Education Center (Russian: Молодёжный образовательный центр Государственного Эрмитажа), is a contemporary art education program in Saint Petersburg, Russia that is part of The Hermitage Museum. The program is offered for all students, whether from St. Petersburg, other Russian cities or from abroad. Activities include lectures on the history and theory of art, exhibitions of contemporary art, masterclasses, and access to Museum curators and collections. There are also special semester programs for students studying from abroad. State Hermitage Youth Education Center organizes a number of international festivals and cultural programs on the history and traditions of different countries and nations.

== History ==
The Youth Center was launched in 2000 when Mijaíl Borisovich Piotrovsk, Director of The Hermitage, signed the order for the creation of the Student Club which bears the same name as the museum. Since 2011, it has been located in the east wing of Saint Petersburg's General Staff Building, and since its founding it's been supervised by curator Sofía Vladimirovna Kudryavtseva.

== Educational and cultural programs ==
=== Thematic sections ===
At the core of the Student Club are thematic sections, which are managed by museum staff. Membership is open to students or graduates from universities in Saint Petersburg or from those in the Leningrad region. Which thematic section they decide to join depends exclusively on their particular inclinations and interests. All activities at the Youth Center begin on October 1 – the day on which Russia celebrates “student day” in the Hermitage Theatre.

=== Educational Programs ===
==== Present Art ====
The "Present Art" program includes masterclasses and exhibitions of renowned artists, meetings with curators of international art projects, lectures about current issues in contemporary art, discussions and seminars. These programs invite the participation of representatives from specific departments of Russian universities (St. Petersburg State University, Herzen University, I. Repin St.Petersburg State Academy Institute of painting, sculpture and architecture, Saint Petersburg Stieglitz State Academy of Art and Design).

==== Project “Hermitage 20/21” ====
This educational program includes meetings with curators of exhibitions, conferences and masterclasses conducted by artists. Recent programs for the exhibitions:

- “Jake and Dinos Chapman: The end of fun” (in Russian: Конец веселья)
- "Anthony Gormley: In all the growth" (in Russian: Во весь рост)
- "Henry Moore in the Hermitage: Sculpture and drawing."
- "Annie Leibovitz: The life of a photographer: 1990-2005 "(Russian: Жизнь фотографа: 1990–2005).

==== Museum and small museologists ====
On February 1, 2013, The Youth Center launched a new and unique program, "Museum and small museologist", thanks to the initiative of St. Petersburg State University's Philosophy Department and approved by Director of The Hermitage. This program is directed to students 9 to 11 years old and strives to show them how a contemporary art museum works and what its employees do. During the academic year, the students meet with principal figures of the museum - the director, restorers, curators, for example - and thereby learn about the real work of different departments of the museum.

==== Let's meet the Yamal! ====
This program was developed by the Youth Center in collaboration with the Yamalo-Nenets Fraternity – members of the Student Club - to teach about the colorful history of this indigenous people. The program includes an exhibition of applied art, workshops, masterclasses, folk concerts and documentary film screenings.
