= Arca Totok Kerot =

Stone statue of a giant, in Kediri, Indonesia

Coordinates: 7.79804°S 112.07037°E

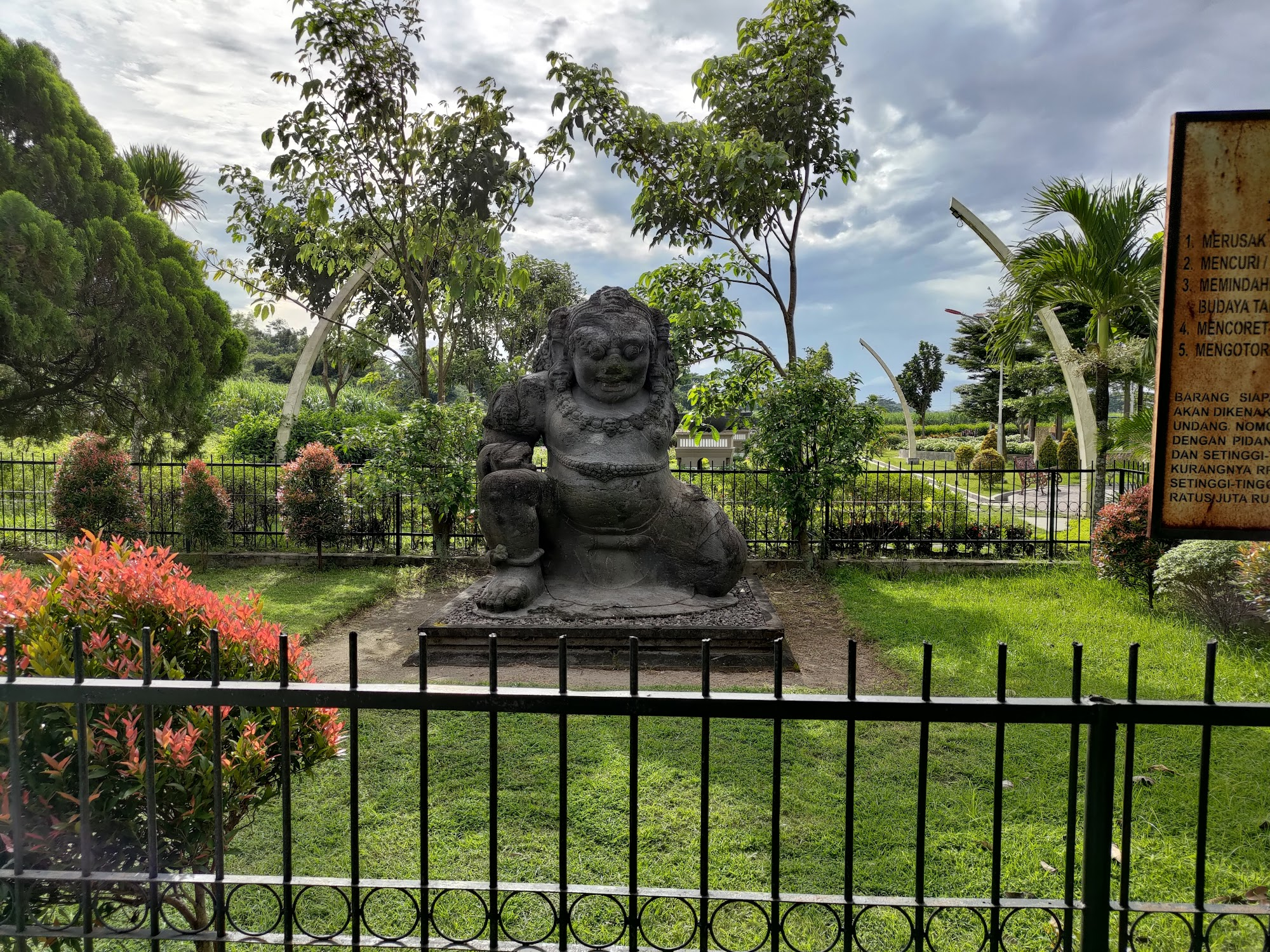
Totok Kerot statue in Kediri

Arca Totok Kerot or Recå Thothokkerot IPA: [rətʃɔ ʈɔʈɔʔ kərɔt] is a statue (Jav. arcå or recå means "statue") located in Bulusari Village, Pagu District, Kediri Regency, Indonesia; about 2 kilometers north-east of Simpang Lima Gumul. It is made of andesite stone, depicting a giant with a terrifying face. The style is that of a dvarapala. Based on the style, it is suggested that it was made in the 10th century.

== Physical features ==
The face and other ornaments also suggest that it is a representation of a female butå. This is unusual since most dvarapala statues show male characteristics. Arca Totok Kerot is 3 meters tall.

The hair is matted, covering the upper part of the back. A kind of tiara with a glimpse of skull is seen above the forehead covering the ears. The eyes are protruding, creating a terrifying effect, as if it were angry.

Like many other dvarapala statues, it kneels on one knee. The left knee touches the ground while the right knee is erected, on which the right hand is laid. The left hand is missing, so it is unknown if it originally held a gådå (mace) like other dvarapala statues. All hands and legs are wearing binggêl (bracelets).

The nipples are clearly shown on the breast, another indication that it is female. It wears a necklace of skulls, usually worn by worshipers of Durga or Shiva. A girdle is encircling its waist, on which some kind of skirt is hanging.

== Discovery and excavation ==
The statue was discovered in 1981.

In 2013, due to an imminent plan by the local government to enlarge the road near Arca Totok Kerot, an excavation was hastily carried out searching for other archaeological remains. The excavation was conducted by the East Java Hall of Cultural Heritage Preservation (Balai Pelestarian Cagar Budaya Jawa Timur). The possibility was considered because dvarapala statues were usually placed to guard a temple complex or other important sites.

The excavation took place for six days. The team dug an average 1.5 meters into the surrounding ground, in some points even 4 meters. However, no other archaeological remains were found. Eventually, the excavation was terminated and the cavities were filled. The road in front of the statue was then enlarged.

== Folklore related to the statue ==
Tales were abound surrounding the statue. Some were already documented and many others were still transmitted orally. Some tales related the statue to the legendary character Calon Arang, but such connection was refuted by Timoer (1981). Others were connected to the legendary king Jayabaya (Santosa, 2005).

== See also ==
- Totok Kerot
- Kediri Regency
- Candi of Indonesia
