= Badas, Kediri =

Kecamatan in Kediri Regency, East Java Province, Indonesia

Coordinates: 7°42′0″S 112°12′0″E

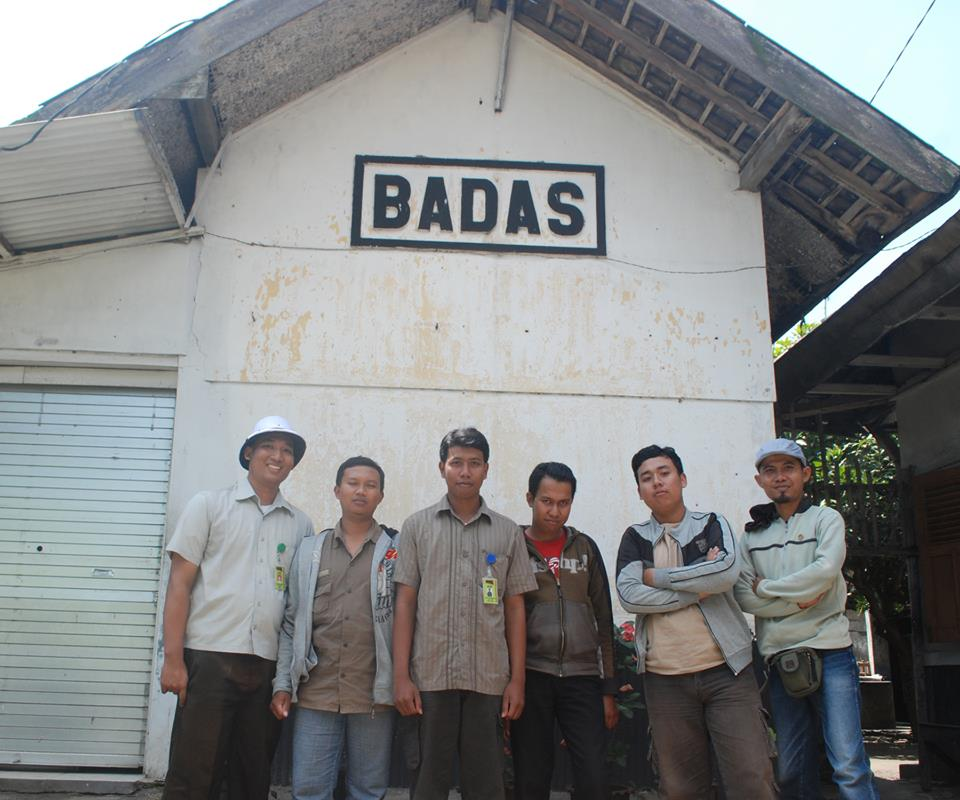
The former Badas railway station

Badas is a kecamatan (district) in Kediri Regency, East Java Province, Indonesia. Badas is primarily known for its local fish market, and fish exportation.
