= Puerta de San Vicente =

Monumental gate located in the Glorieta de San Vicente in Madrid

Coordinates: 40°25′13″N 3°43′13″W

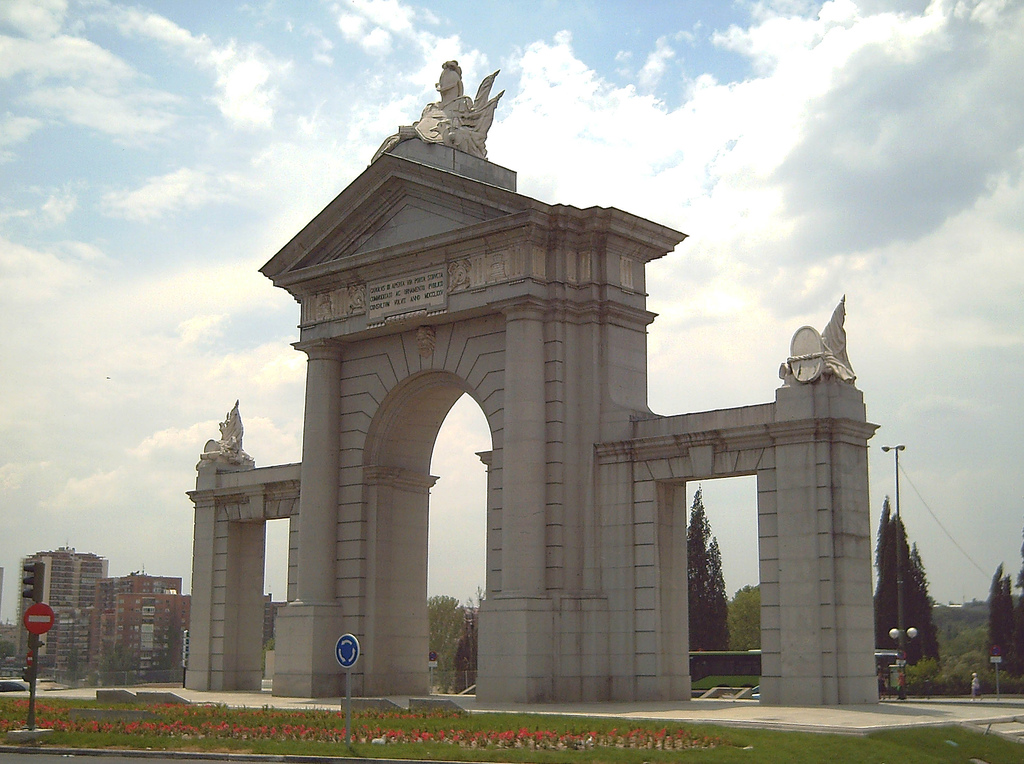
Puerta de San Vicente (Madrid) 01

The Puerta de San Vicente is a monumental gate located in the Glorieta de San Vicente in Madrid (Spain). Since 1995, it has occupied the space where the original door, designed by architect Francesco Sabatini, was located between 1775 and 1892.

== History ==
Throughout Madrid's history there have been several doors that have received the same name. In 1726, the Marquis of Vadillo, the town's mayor, commissioned Pedro de Ribera to build a monumental gate in the city's fence to replace a previous gate, which was in a dilapidated state and was called "del Parque". The gate, which consisted of three arches, was decorated with a statue of San Vicente, which is why it was given that name, although it would also be known later as the gate of La Florida.

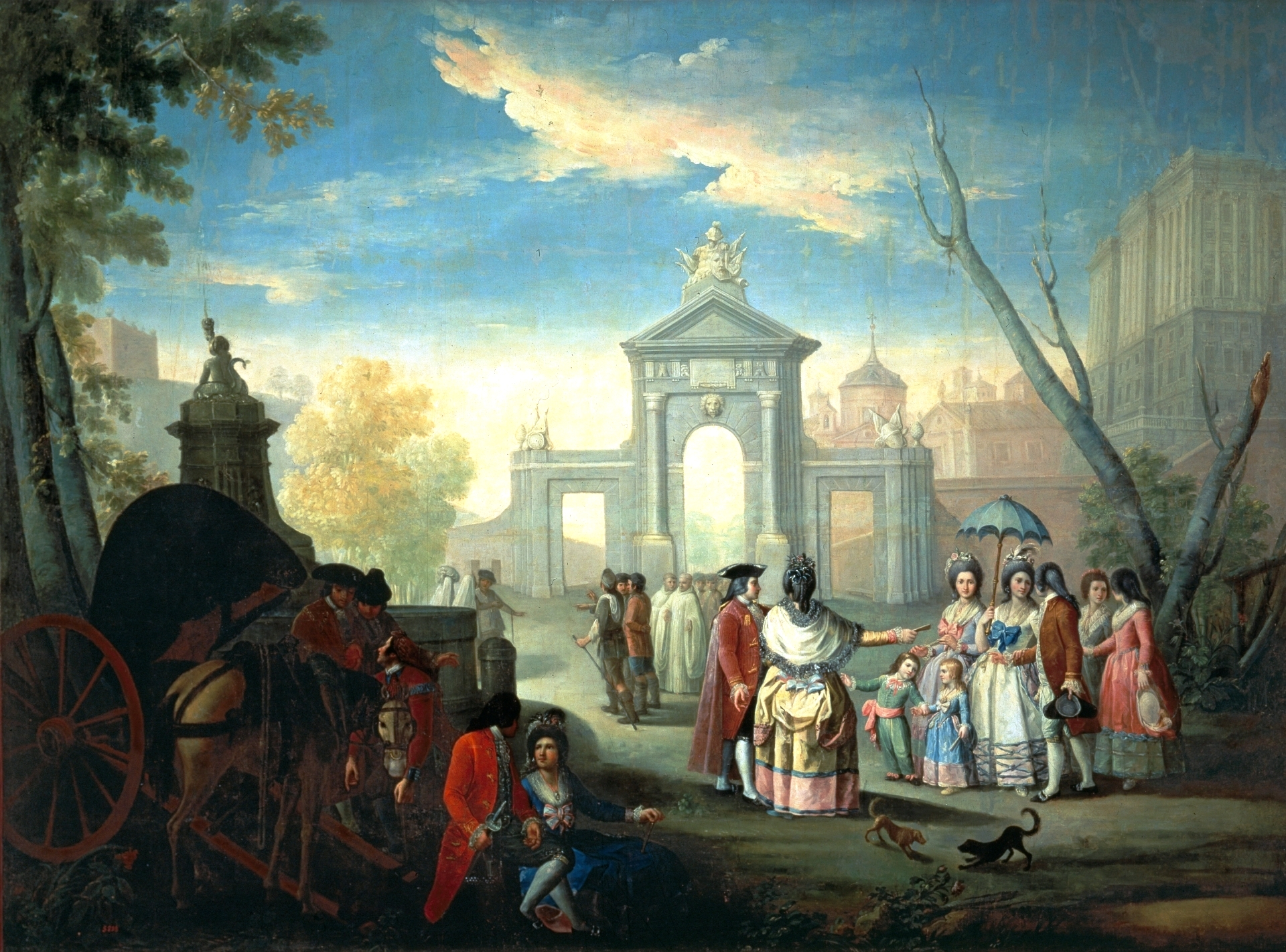
La Puerta de San Vicente, by Ginés Andrés de Aguirre (Museo del Prado)

It was demolished in 1770, due to the remodelling of the Cuesta de San Vicente (1767–1777), as part of the reorganisation of the western accesses to the Royal Palace and its connection with the Camino de El Pardo. Shortly afterwards, King Carlos III commissioned Francesco Sabatini to build a new gate to replace the previous one as the entrance to the city from the new Paseo de La Florida. The work was completed in 1775 and Sabatini placed an ornamental fountain next to it, popularly known as the Fuente de los Mascarones.

The new gate was in its current location, closer to the river than the previous one. It consisted of an arch and two shutters (or portholes) and was built of granite and limestone from Colmenar de Oreja. The arch was decorated with two Doric columns on the outside and two pilasters, also Doric, on the inside. It was crowned by a triangular frontispiece finished with a military trophy. The lateral shutters were also crowned by military trophies. In front of it there were two buildings that also disappeared: the aforementioned Mascarones fountain, between 1775 and 1871, and the Washerwomen's Asylum promoted by María Victoria dal Pozzo, from 1872 to 1938.

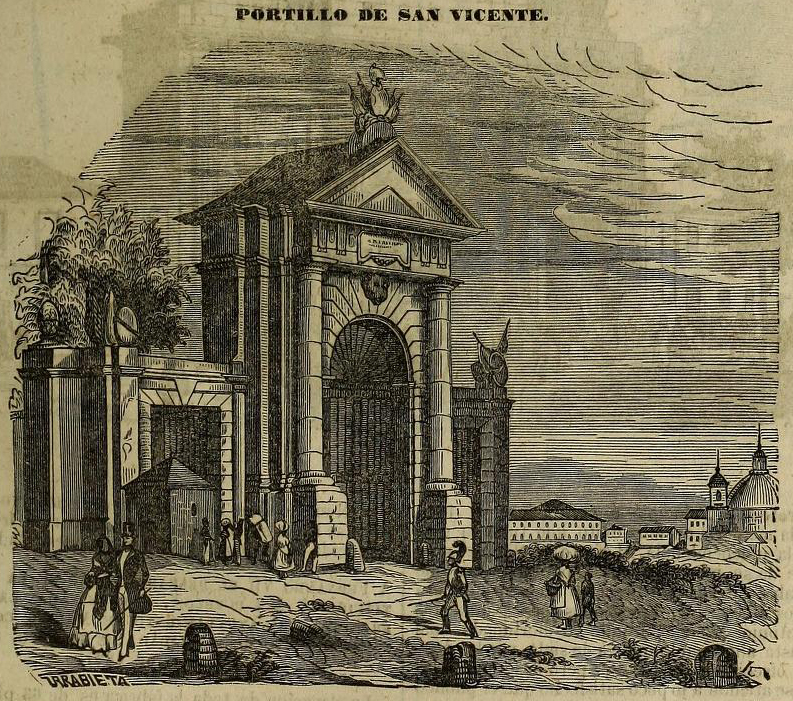
Puerta de San Vicente, in Madoz's Geographical, Historical and Statistical Dictionary

In 1890 the gate was dismantled to improve traffic in the area (other sources give the date 1892).{ However, the remains were lost and remain unaccounted for (there are theories that say that cobblestones were made from its stone; others that were taken to the municipal warehouses of the Casa de Campo and then, in the face of the lack of interest in them, were buried, but were never found despite being searched in the late decades of the 20th century).

In the 1990s, the Madrid City Council decided to replace the gate in the same place where it was located. To do this, a replica was made under the direction of the engineer Juan A. de las Heras Azcona, being located in the opposite position to the original, that is, facing the city. The new San Vicente gate then moved to the Juan de Villanueva fountain, which had been in that location since 1952, and was moved to the Parque del Oeste.

For the replica, in concrete veneered with grey granite and limestone, the mouldings of the upper cornices that were still preserved from the original were used, as well as the reference of the original plans and a photograph from 1890 by Laurent. Among the elements reproduced, the ornaments by José Luis Parés Parra stand out.

== See also ==
- List of post-Roman triumphal arches
