= Mäñgılık El Triumphal Arch =

Mäñgılık El
- Мәңгілік Ел
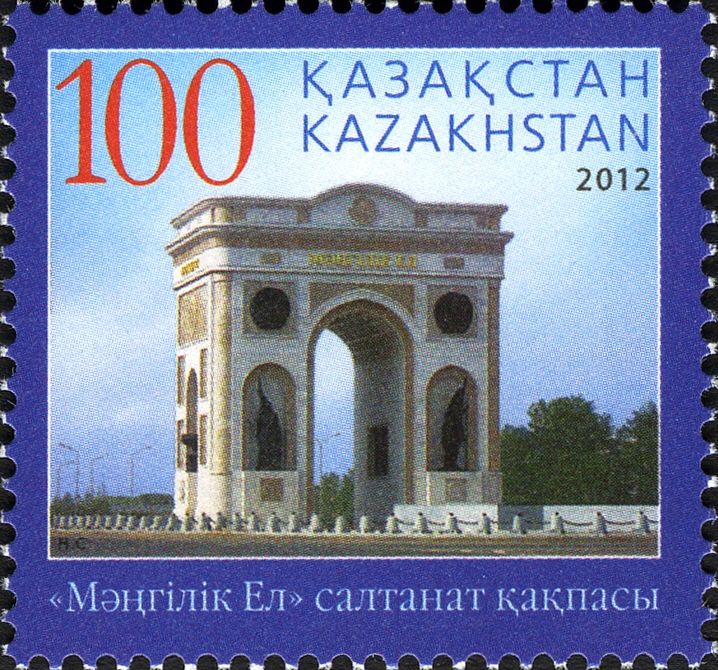
- Mäñgılık El on a Kazakh postcard.
- Interactive map of the Mäñgılık El area

General information
- Location: Astana, Kazakhstan
- Coordinates: 51°06′15.5″N 71°25′48.3″E
- Completed: 16 December 2011

Height
- Height: 20 m

Design and construction
- Architect: Sağyndyq Jambulatov

Mäñgılık El (Kazakh: Мәңгілік ел, lit. 'Eternal Nation') is a 20-meter-tall triumphal arch located in Astana, Kazakhstan. The monument was inaugurated on 16 December 2011, marking the 20th anniversary of Kazakhstan’s independence. It was initiated by the country’s first president, Nursultan Nazarbayev.

== Design and symbolism ==
The arch is exactly 20 meters high, symbolizing 20 years of independence. It was designed by Sağyndyq Jambulatov and architect Kanat Kurganov.

The exterior of the arch is finished with granite and marble. Visitors can access an observation platform at the top by means of a spiral staircase.

The monument features four sculptural figures at its base: an Elder (symbolizing wisdom), a Mother-Woman (representing kindness), a traditional Kazakh warrior, and a modern soldier. The sides of the arch are decorated with national ornaments. State symbols including the national emblem and flag appear at the top of the structure.

Symbolic elements include the Tay-Kazan—a cauldron placed on each side, representing unity and hospitality—and the Qalqan (shield), a traditional Kazakh weapon, installed at the apex to signify defense and resilience.

== Interior ==
The interior of the arch features relief panels and inscriptions reflecting Kazakhstan’s historical and cultural legacy. Among these is a bas-relief of the Declaration of State Sovereignty of the Kazakh SSR, marking a key moment in the country’s path to independence.

== Accessibility and public use ==
Due to nearby roadways, an underground pedestrian crossing was constructed to facilitate safe access. The observation deck at 21.5 meters provides views of the city and includes a small multimedia exhibition space.

Since 2017, the arch has been open to the public. Entrance fees are 500 tenge for adults and 200 tenge for children. The site is open from 10:00 to 17:00, Tuesday through Sunday (closed on Mondays, except during special events).

== Cultural significance ==
The Mäñgılık El Arch is part of a broader initiative to symbolize Kazakhstan’s statehood, national unity, and historical continuity. It forms part of the “Mäñgılık El” ideological concept promoted by Nazarbayev as a vision for Kazakhstan’s national identity.

== See also ==
- Baiterek
- Palace of Independence (Astana)
- National Museum of the Republic of Kazakhstan
