= Vasily Demut-Malinovsky =

Russian sculptor (1779–1846)

- Василий Иванович Демут-Малиновский
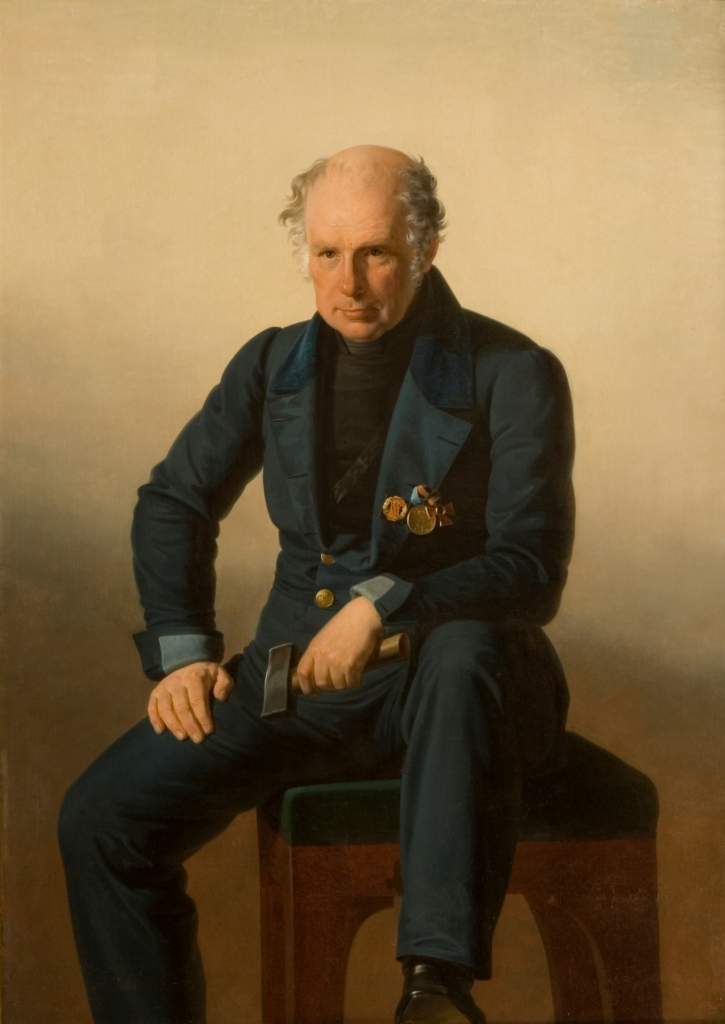
- Portrait by Gury Krylov, 1839
- Born: March 2, 1779; Saint Petersburg, Russian Empire
- Died: July 16, 1846 (aged 67); Saint Petersburg, Russian Empire
- Education: Member Academy of Arts (1807)
- Known for: Sculpture
- Awards: Big Gold Medal of the Imperial Academy of Arts (1800) Big Gold Medal of the Imperial Academy of Arts (1802)

Vasily Ivanovich Demut-Malinovsky (Russian: Василий Иванович Демут-Малиновский); 2 (13) March 1779 – 16 (28) July 1846 was a Russian sculptor whose works represent the quintessence of the Empire style.

== Biography ==
He entered the Imperial Academy of Arts at the age of six and studied under Mikhail Kozlovsky for fifteen years. Upon the death of his teacher, he won a competition to design his tomb and departed for Rome to study with Canova. Success came to him with two colossal statues for the Kazan Cathedral in St Petersburg.

In the aftermath of the Russian victory over Napoleon, Demut-Malinovsky executed a number of patriotic pieces, including a tomb and a large statue of Barclay de Tolly in Estonia. Later Alexander I assigned to him the task of preparing bas-reliefs symbolizing the Neva and the Volga for the Alexander Column on Palace Square.

Demut-Malinovsky also designed statuary and decorations for other St Petersburg churches, palaces, and public monuments, especially those designed by Carlo Rossi: the General Staff Building, the Bourse, the Admiralty, the Mining Institute, the Egyptian Gate, the Narva Gate, and the Mikhailovsky Palace.

== Works ==
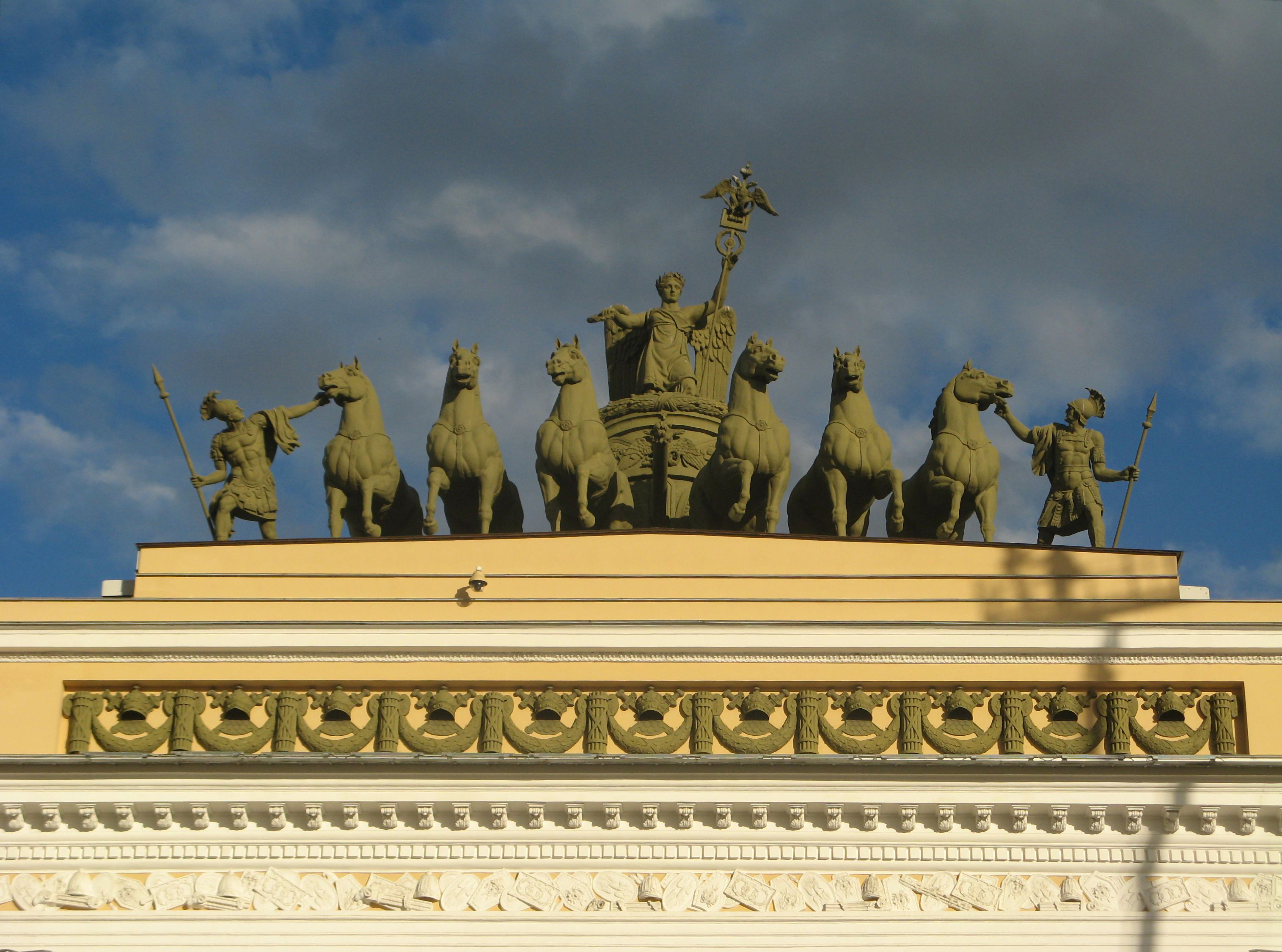
Sculptural composition on the arch of the General Staff Building

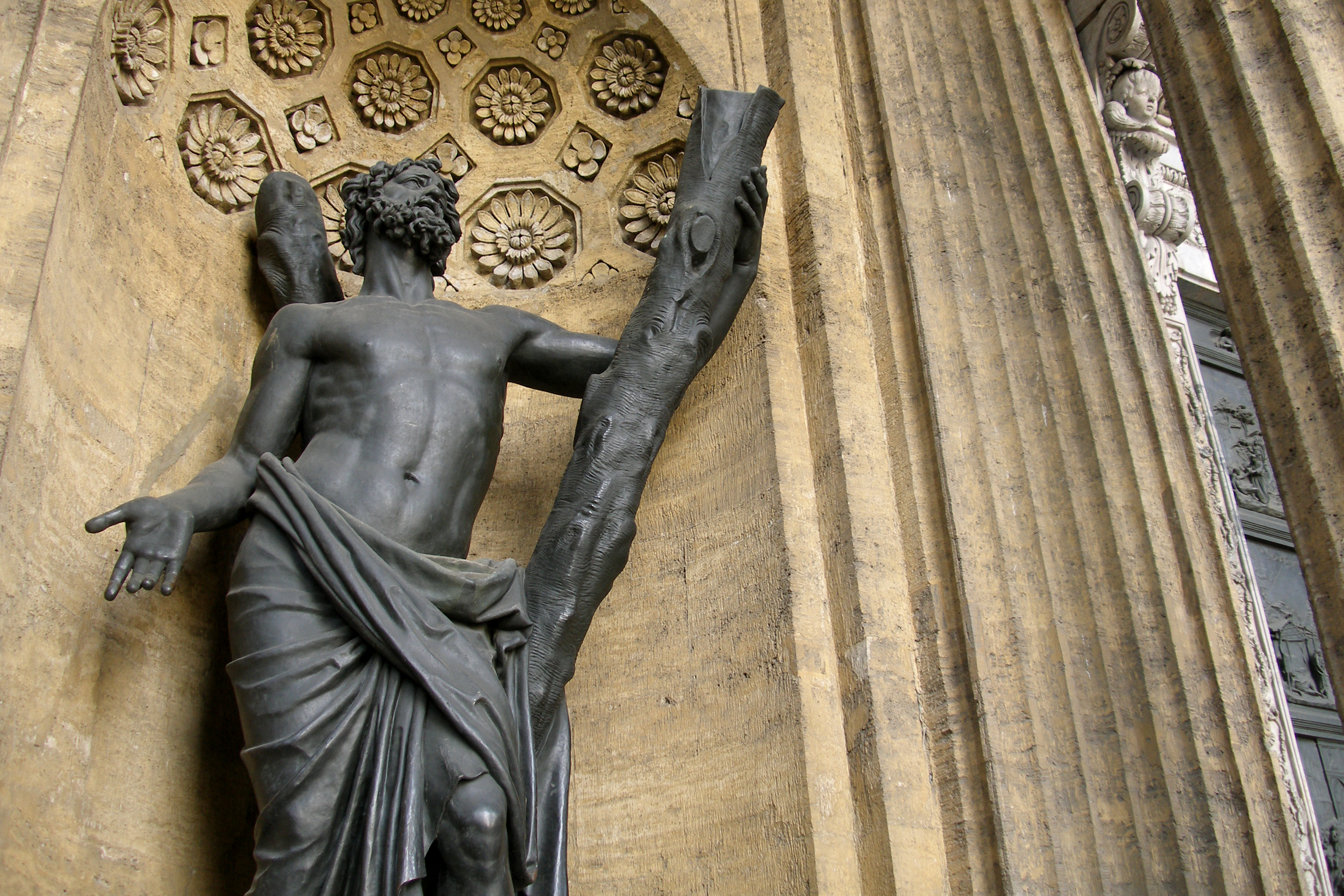
Andrew the Apostle, Kazan Cathedral

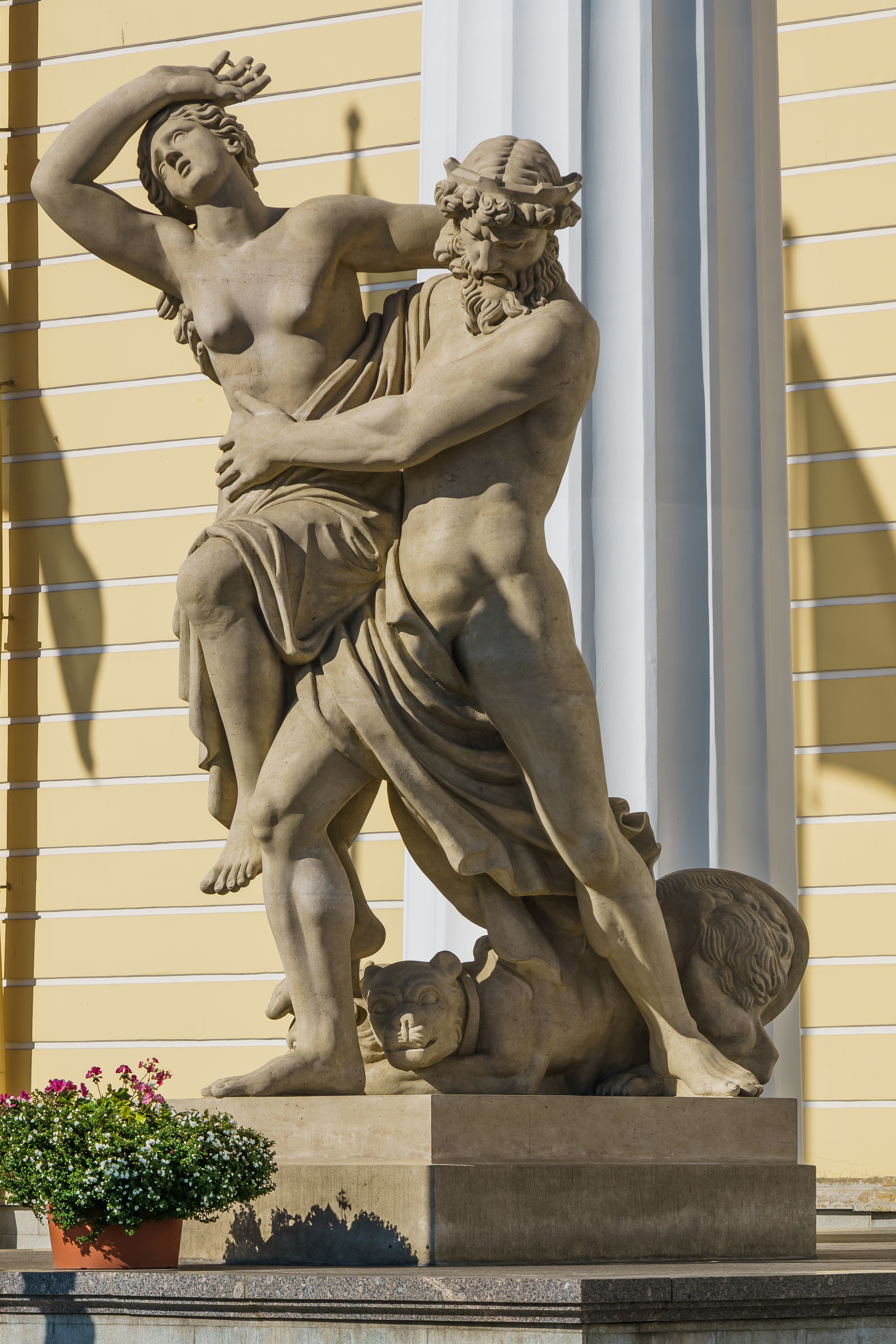
Abduction of Proserpine

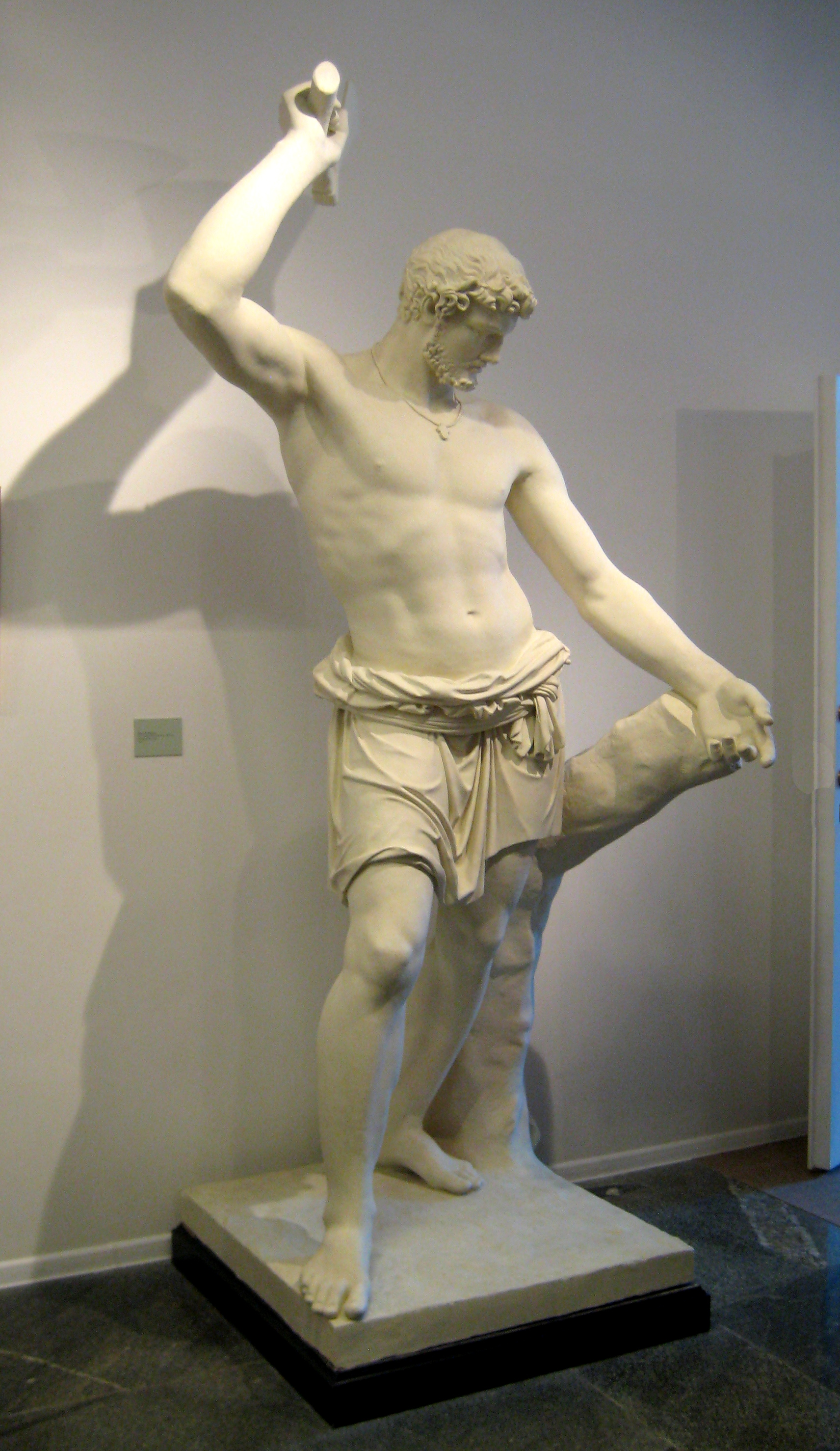
Russian Scaevola

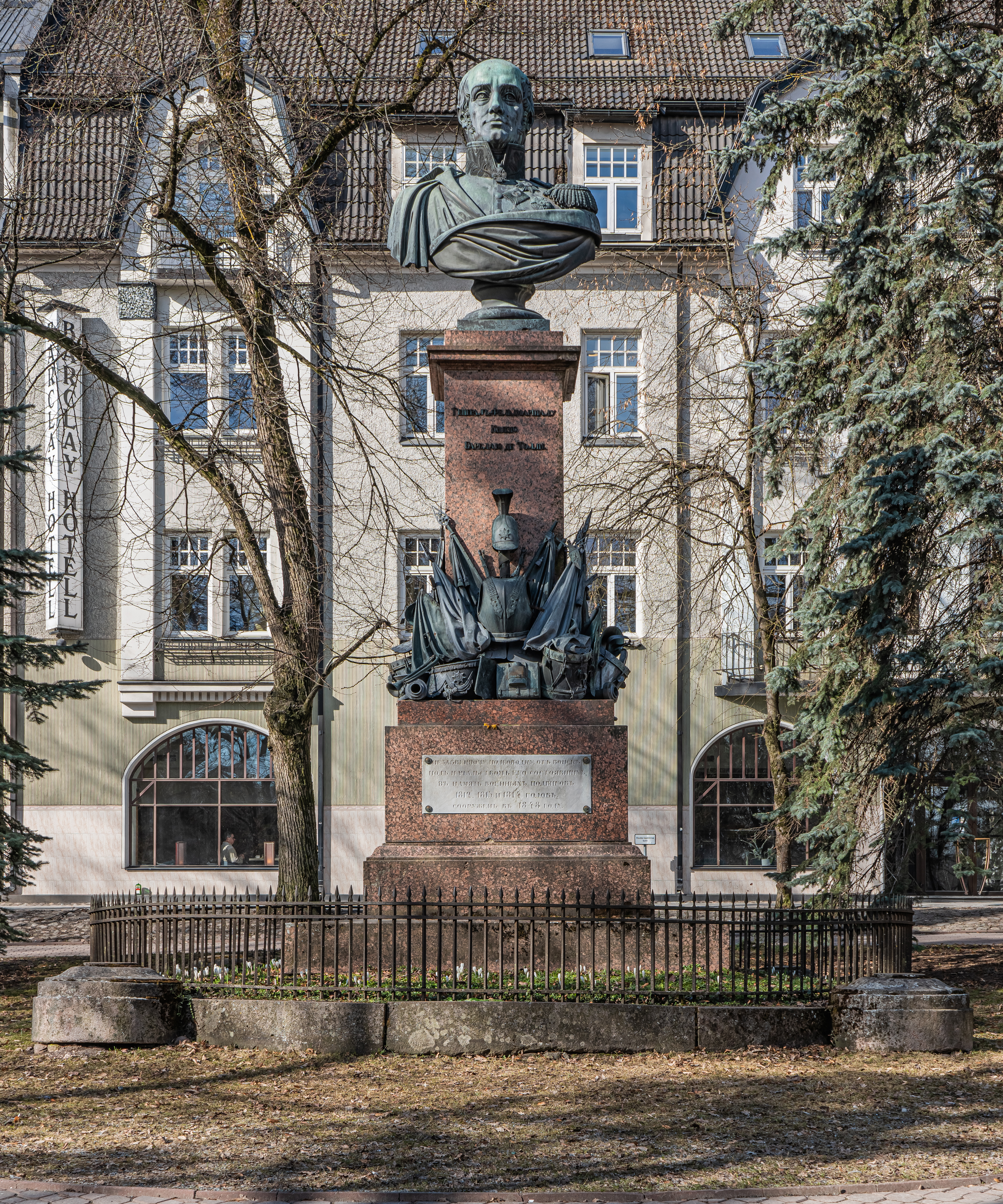
Monument to Barclay de Tolly (Tartu)

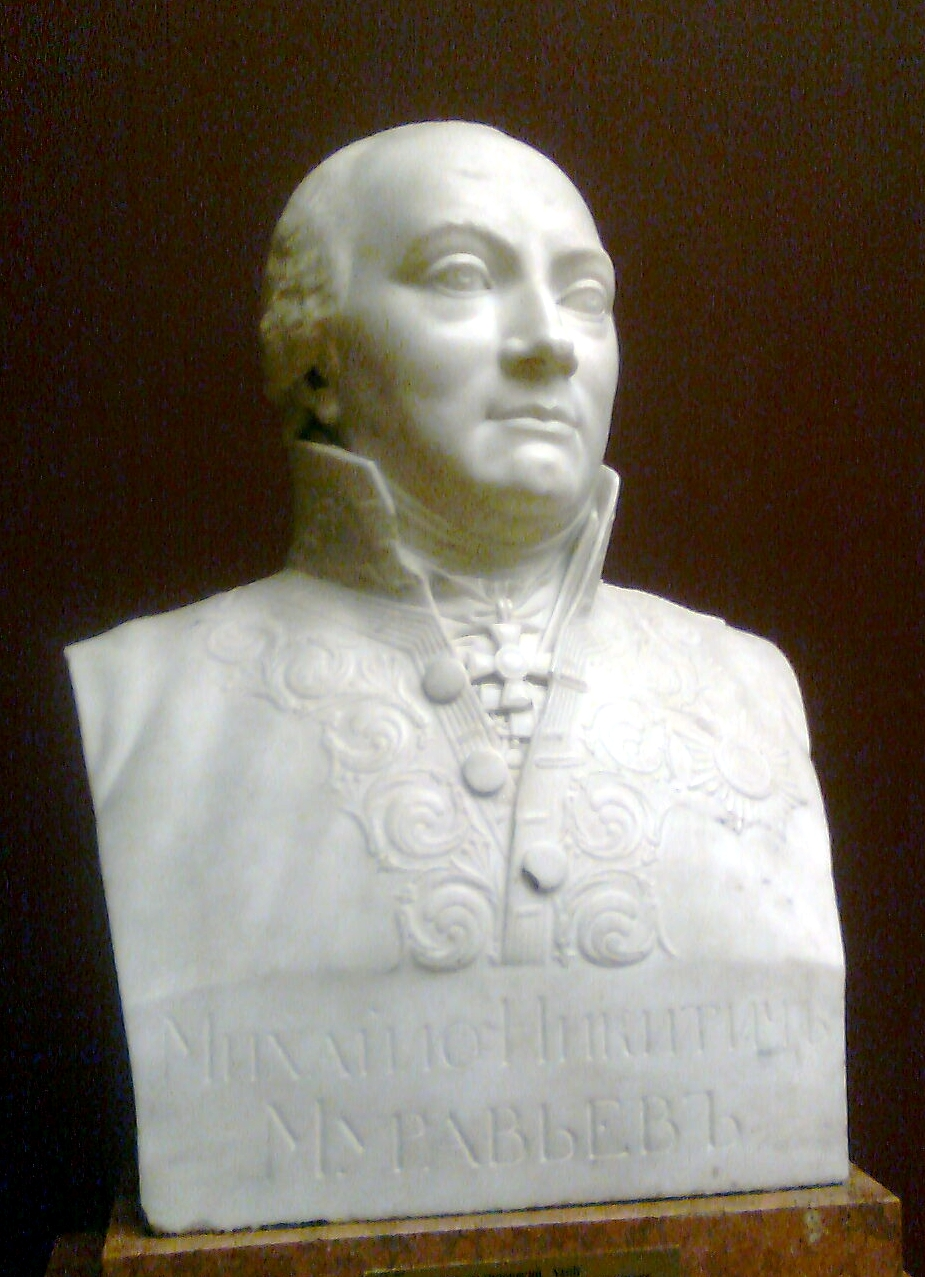
Bust of Mikhail Muravyov

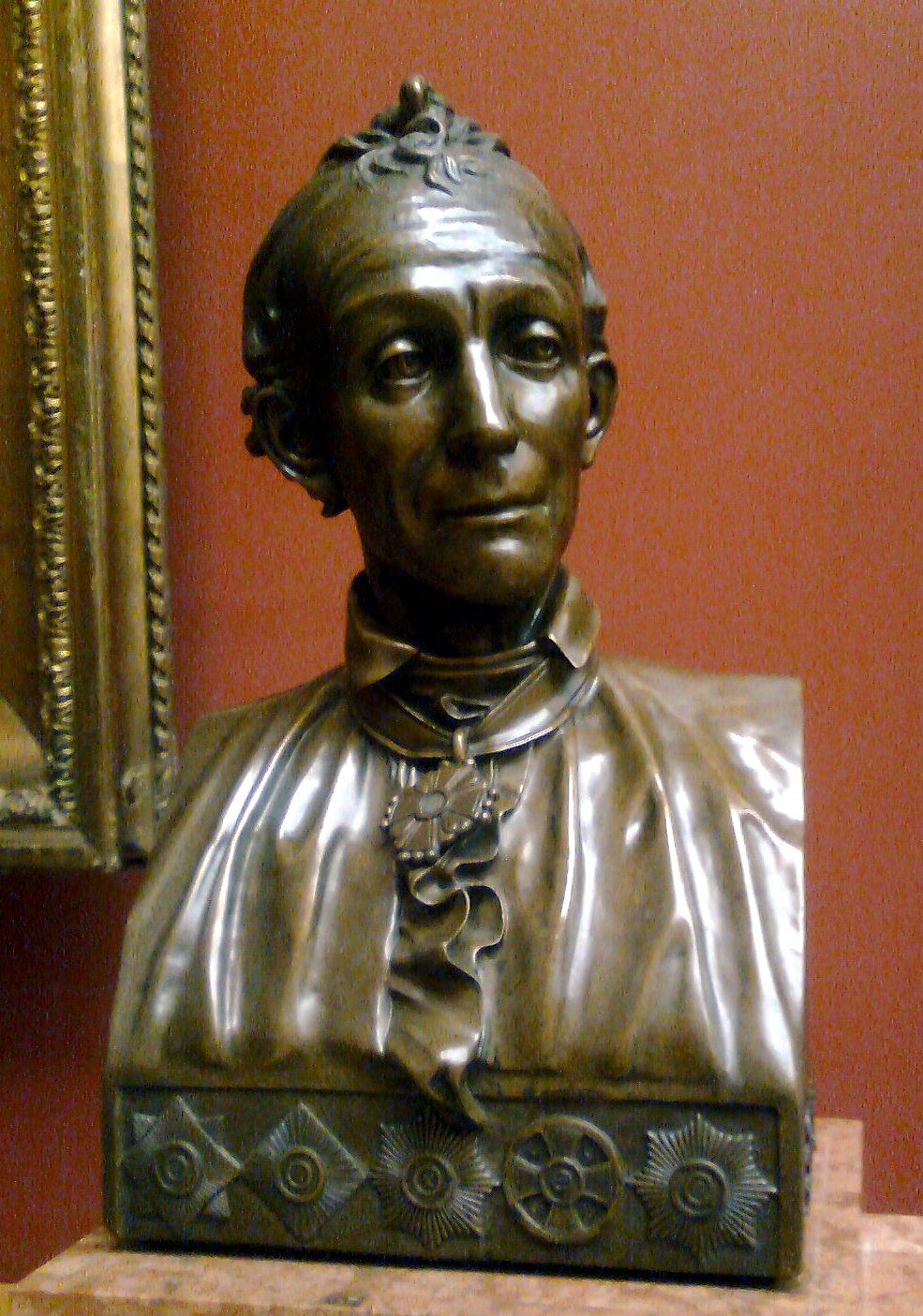
Bust of Alexander Suvorov

== Bibliography ==
- С. Н. Кондаков (1915). Юбилейный справочник Императорской Академии художеств. 1764-1914 (in Russian). Vol. 2. p. 251.
