= General Staff Building (Saint Petersburg) =

Building in Saint Petersburg, Russia

Coordinates: 59.9381°N 30.3172°E

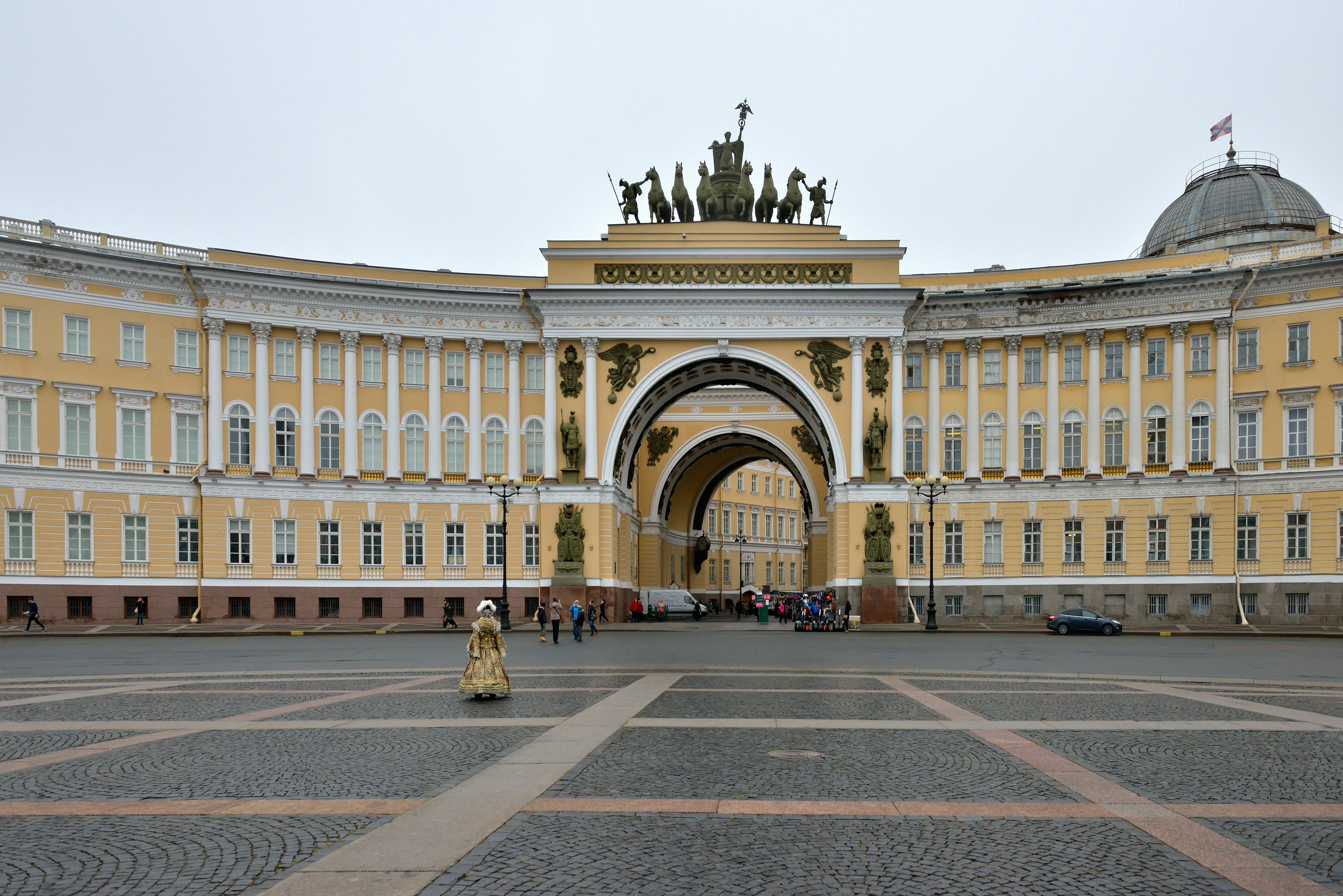
General Staff Building

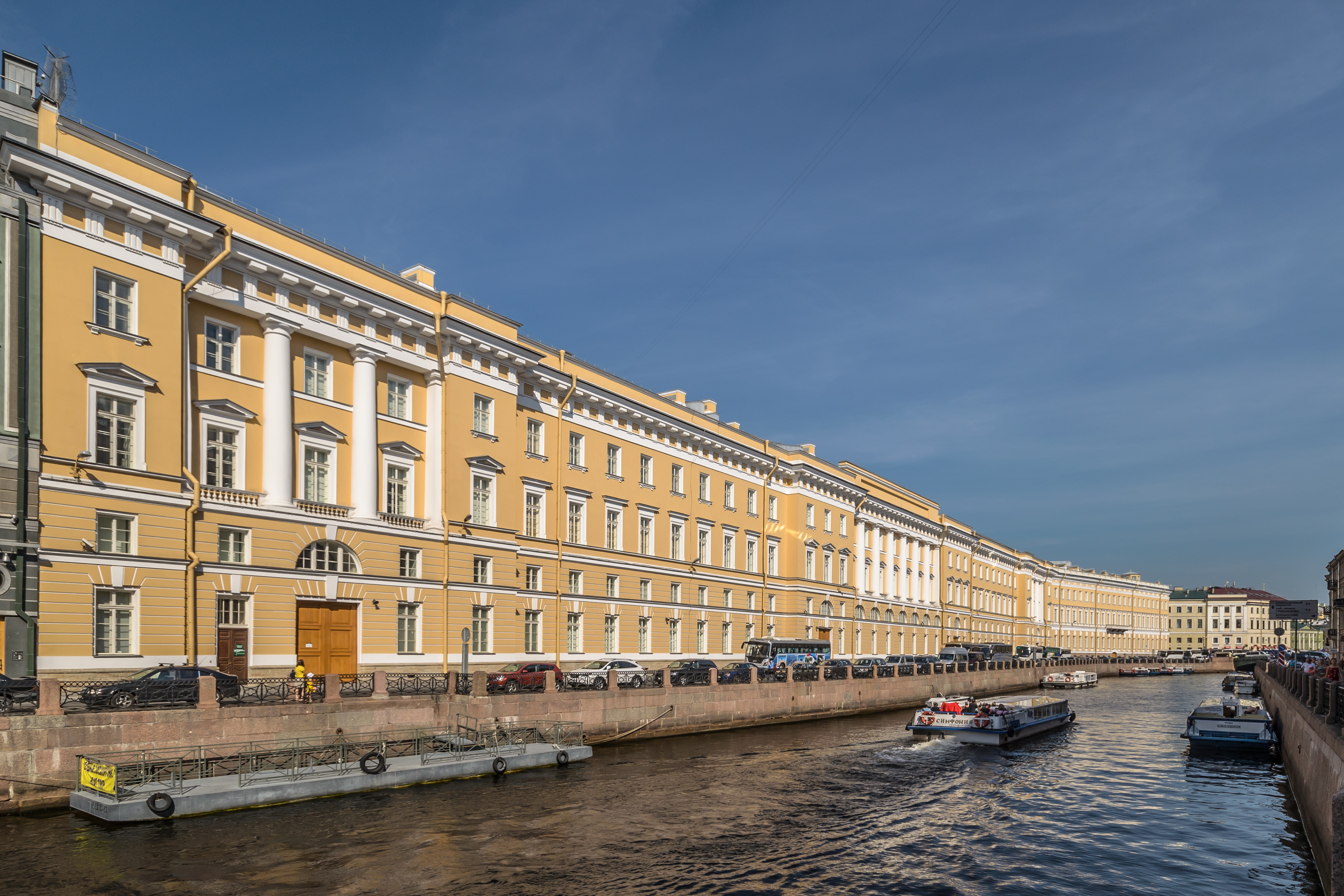
Eastern Facade

The General Staff Building (Russian: Здание Главного штаба, Zdanie Glavnogo Shtaba) is an edifice with a 580 m-long (1,900 ft) bow-shaped facade, situated on Palace Square in Saint Petersburg, Russia, in front of the Winter Palace.

The monumental Neoclassical building was designed by Carlo Rossi in the Empire style and built in 1819–1829. It consists of two wings, which are separated by a tripartite triumphal arch adorned by sculptors Stepan Pimenov and Vasily Demuth-Malinovsky and commemorating the Russian victory over Napoleonic France in the Patriotic War of 1812. The arch links Palace Square through Bolshaya Morskaya Street to Nevsky Prospekt.

Until the capital was transferred to Moscow in 1918, the building served as the headquarters of the General Staff (western wing), Foreign Ministry and Finance Ministry (eastern wing).

The western wing now hosts the headquarters of the Leningrad Military District. The eastern wing was given to the Hermitage Museum in 1993 and was extensively remodeled inside.

== See also ==
- General Staff Building (Moscow)
