= Pare District =

Coordinates: 7.77851°S 112.1731°E

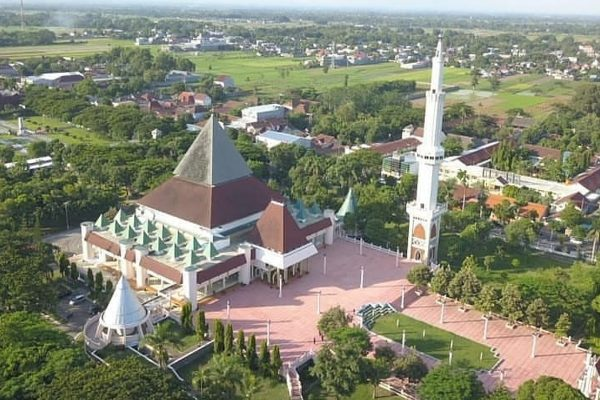
An Nur Grand Mosque in Pare as seen from above

Pare (or Mojokuto) is a town and district in the Kediri regency (kabupaten) within the province of East Java, Indonesia. The district covers an area of 52.27 km^{2} and had a population of 98,594 at the 2010 census and 106,007 at the 2020 census; the official estimate as at mid 2024 was 110,513.

The village of Tulungrejo in western Pare is popularly known for the local Pare English Village (Indonesian: Kampung Inggris Pare), which emerged after the American anthropologist Clifford Geertz (as part of the Modjokuto project) conducted research there into religion in Java in relation to Indonesian politics after the legislative election and the election for the Constitutional Assembly of 1955.

== See also ==
- Agricultural Involution
