= Kediri Regency =

Regency in East Java, Indonesia

Kediri Regency Kabupaten Kediri
- Regency

Other transcription(s)
  - Javanese: Kadhiri (Gêdrig) كاڎيري (Pégon) ꦏꦝꦶꦫꦶ (Hånåcåråkå)
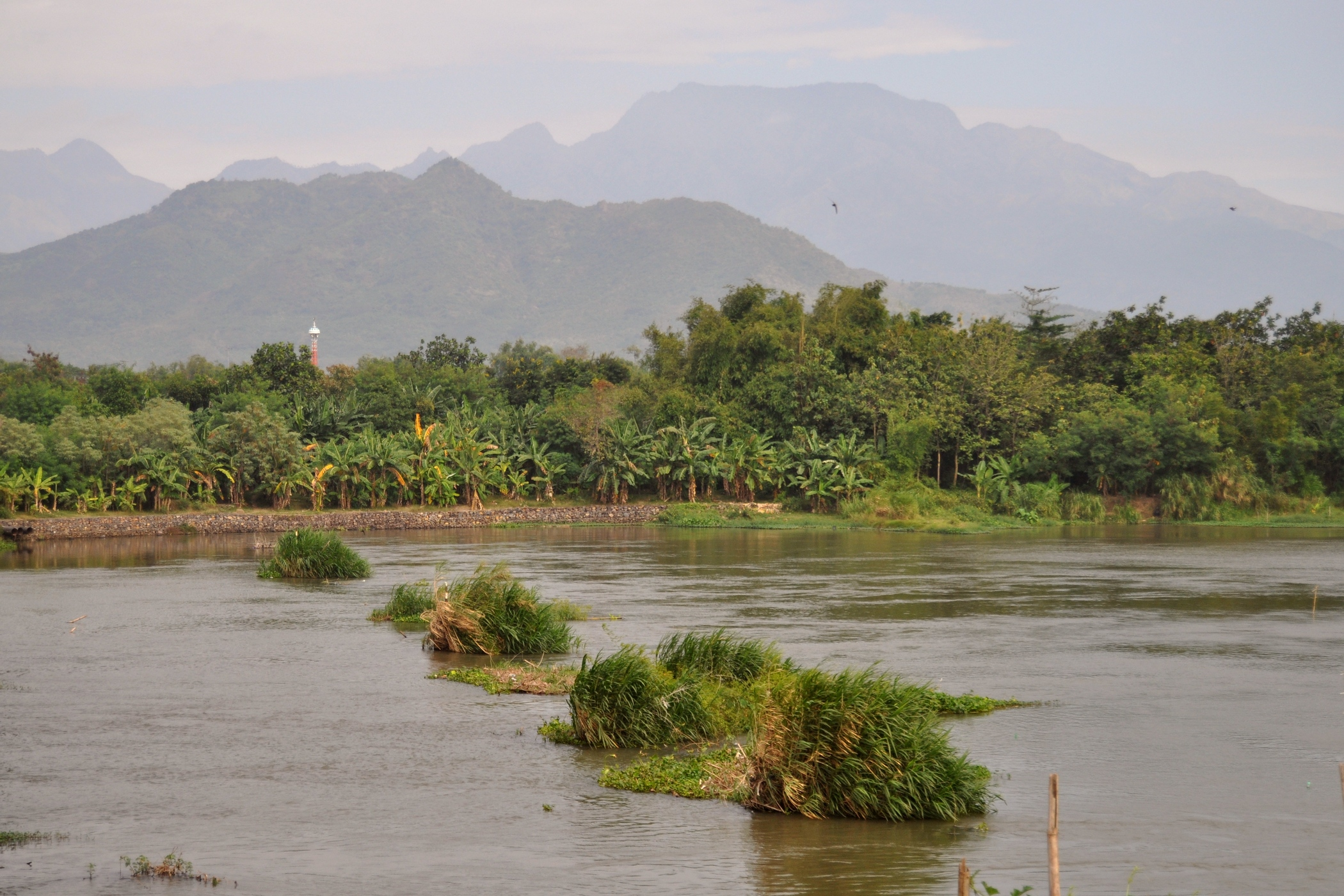
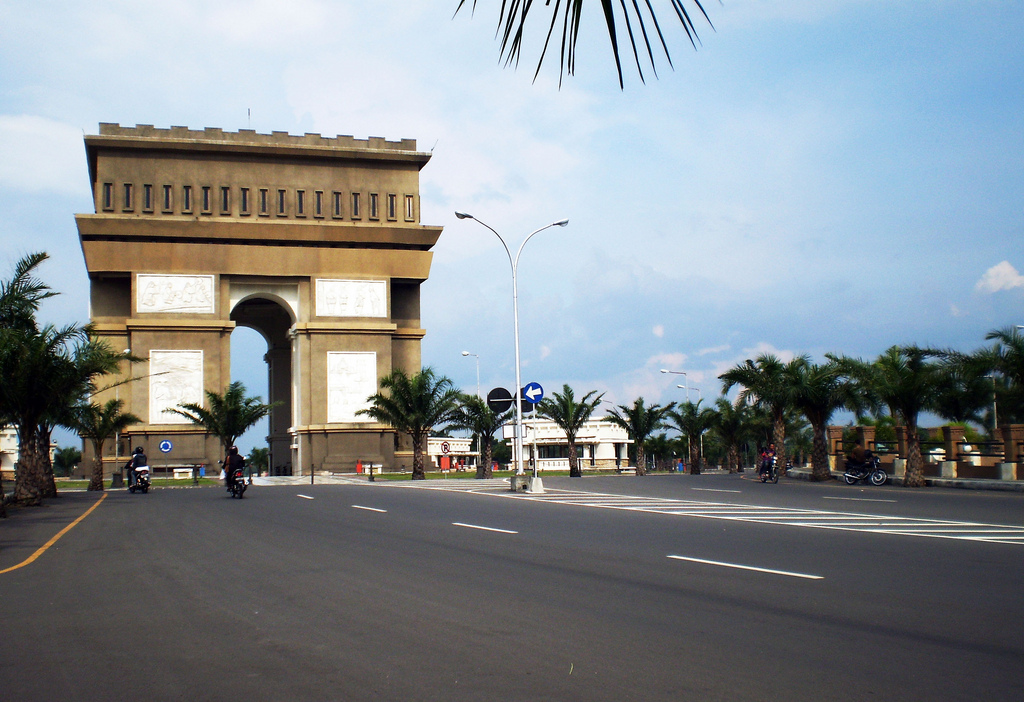
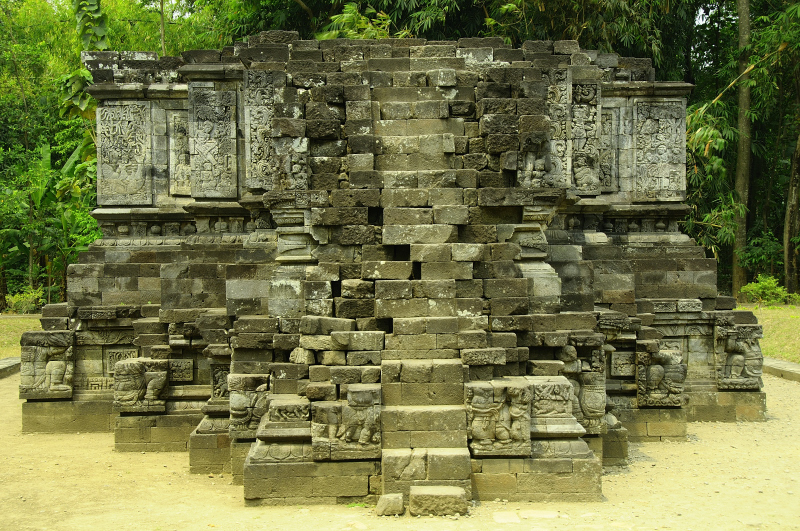
- Clockwise, from top left : View of Mount Wilis and the Brantas River at Kediri, Surowono Temple, Simpang Lima Gumul Monument

- Coat of arms
- Motto(s): Canda Bhirawa (forming the gallantry by the bond of unity)
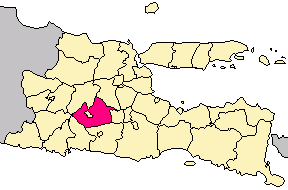
- Location within East Java

- Location in Java and Indonesia Kediri Regency (Indonesia)
- Coordinates: 7.8333°S 112.1667°E
- Country: Indonesia
- Province: East Java
- Capital: Ngasem

Government
  - Regent: Hanindhito Himawan Pramono
  - Vice Regent: Dewi Mariya Ulfa

Area
  - Total: 1,522.89 km^{2} (587.99 sq mi)

Population (mid 2025 estimate)
  - Total: 1,702,262
  - Density: 1,117.78/km^{2} (2,895.05/sq mi)
- Time zone: UTC+7 (IWST)
- Area code: (+62) 354
- Website: kedirikab.go.id

Kediri Regency (Javanese: ꦏꦣꦶꦫꦶ) is a regency (kabupaten) located in East Java province, Indonesia. It is one of two 'Daerah Tingkat II' that has the name 'Kediri' (the other is the City of Kediri, which is separate from the Regency and whose area and population are thus excluded from the Regency totals). The Regency itself covers an area of 1,522.89 km^{2} and had a population of 1,499,768 as of the 2010 census and 1,635,294 at the 2020 census; the official estimate as at mid 2025 was 1,702,262 (comprising 858,694 males and 843,568 females).

The administrative centre of the regency is in the town of Ngasem, which is effectively a northern suburb of Kediri city, just about 200 metres over the municipal border. However, several regency government establishments are also located within Kediri city, although it is administratively a separate political entity. This is because both the regency and the city share common cultural and historical roots, and the administrative division occurred only after the War of Independence. The regency shares borders with Jombang Regency to the north, Malang Regency to the east, Blitar Regency and Tulungagung Regency to the south, and Nganjuk Regency to the west, while Kediri city is wholly surrounded within the Regency. Kelud mountain, one of the most active volcanoes in Indonesia, is partially administered by the Government of Kediri Regency (along with Blitar Regency).

The regency also contains the famed "Kampung Inggris", or English Village. Kampung Inggris is a small area in Pare District where over a hundred businesses offering various English courses are clustered. Students come from all over Indonesia to take courses in the English Village, where it is common for people to speak with each other in English (rather than Indonesian or Javanese) for the sake of practice. Pare District in the eastern half of the Regency is the most populous and fastest-growing in the Regency and provides a secondary urbanised centre for the regency.

== Administrative districts ==
The regency is divided into twenty-six districts (kecamatan), listed below with their areas and their populations at the 2010 census and the 2020 census, together with the official estimates as at mid 2025. The table also includes the locations of the district administrative centres, the numbers of administrative villages in each district (totaling 343 rural desa and a single urban kelurahan - Pare kelurahan in the district of the same name), and their post codes.

Kode Wilayah	Name of District (kecamatan)	Area in km^{2}	Pop'n census 2010	Pop'n census 2020	Pop'n estimate mid 2025	Admin centre	No. of villages	Post code
35.06.02	Mojo	139.30	73,475	79,617	83,154	Mojo	20	64162
35.06.01	Semen	90.45	50,273	54,742	55,037	Semen	12	64161
35.06.04	Ngadiluwih	44.74	73,573	80,024	81,940	Purwokerto	16	64171
35.06.03	Kras	47.13	56,526	62,616	65,291	Kras	16	64172
35.06.23	Ringinrejo	44.42	50,005	56,906	59,891	Ringinrejo	11	64176
35.06.05	Kandat	54.47	56,160	62,281	64,173	Kandat	12	64173 ^{(a)}
35.06.06	Wates	78.63	83,625	90,772	93,258	Wates	18	64174
35.06.07	Ngancar	95.48	45,035	50,413	53,565	Ngancar	10	64291 ^{(b)}
35.06.09	Plosoklaten	106.78	67,446	74,284	72,927	Ploso Lor	15	64175
35.06.10	Gurah	53.77	77,185	82,573	85,453	Gurah	21	64181 ^{(c)}
35.06.08	Puncu	91.75	58,354	63,659	67,463	Puncu	8	64292
35.06.18	Kepung	90.88	80,682	85,440	88,915	Kepung	10	64293
35.06.19	Kandangan	59.63	47,070	51,683	53,265	Kandangan	12	64294
35.06.17	Pare	50.60	98,594	106,007	110,898	Pare ^{(d)}	9	64211 - 64215, 64225 - 64229
35.06.26	Badas	42.28	59,319	67,286	70,465	Badas	8	64216 - 64224
35.06.21	Kunjang	31.50	33,731	36,765	38,695	Kapi	12	64156
35.06.16	Plemahan	50.27	55,888	60,655	63,482	Bogo Kidul	17	64155
35.06.15	Purwoasri	46.73	54,431	58,965	61,893	Purwoasri	23	64154
35.06.14	Papar	39.57	48,593	52,400	55,189	Papar	17	65153
35.06.11	Pagu	26.93	36,766	40,178	41,705	Sitimerto	13	64184
35.06.24	Kayen Kidul	37.82	43,422	47,150	49,157	Kayen Kidul	12	64183
35.06.12	Gampengrejo ^{(e)}	18.04	31,964	35,528	34,070	Gampeng	11	64182
35.06.25	Ngasem ^{(e)}	22.75	62,061	66,974	63,828	Ngasem	12	64181
35.06.22	Banyakan	70.86	54,175	58,525	60,117	Banyakan	9	64157
35.06.13	Grogol	40.59	44,468	47,528	49,740	Grogol	9	64151
35.06.20	Tarokan	47.52	56,947	62,323	65,878	Tarokan	10	64152
	Totals	1,522.89	1,499,768	1,635,294	1,702,262	Ngasem	344	

Notes: (a) except the village of Ngletih, which has a postcode of 64137. (b) except the village of Kunjang, which has a postcode of 64156. (c) except the village of Gatam, which has a postcode of 64113.
(d) Pare is the sole urban kelurahan in the regency, covering 3.14 km^{2}, with 18,086 inhabitants in 2024.
(e) Gampenrejo and Ngasem Districts effectively contain the northern suburbs of Kediri city.

== Tourist attractions ==
- Simpang Lima Gumul Monument
- Kelud Mountain
- Dolo Waterfall in Wilis Mountain
- Irenggolo Waterfall in Wilis Mountain
