= Narva Triumphal Arch =

Arch in Saint Petersburg, Russia

Coordinates: 59.9009°N 30.2738°E

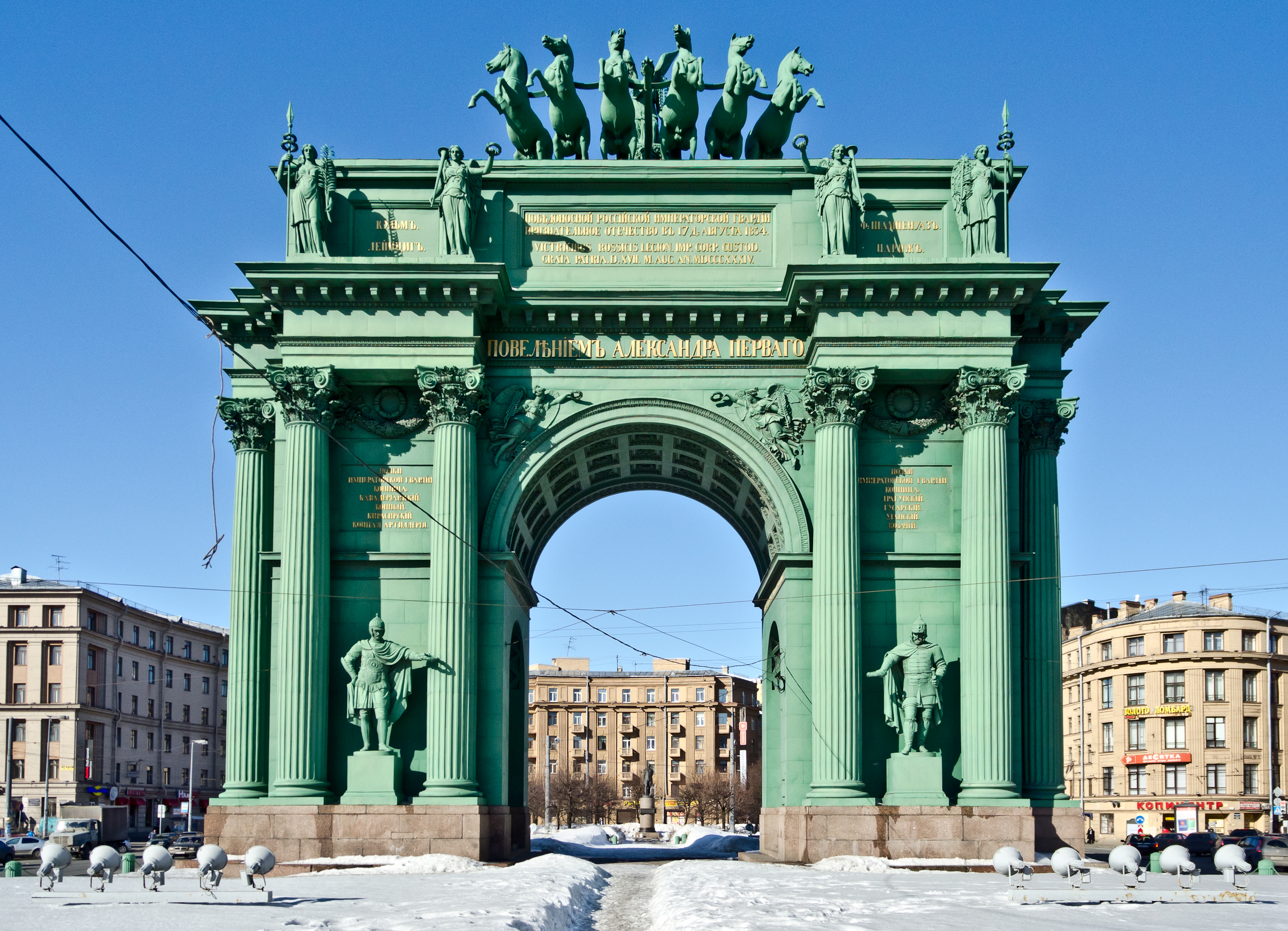
The triumphal arch in March 2011

The Narva Triumphal Arch (Russian: На́рвские триумфа́льные ворота, lit. Narvskie Triumfal'nyye vorota) was erected in the vast Stachek Square (prior to 1923 also known as the Narva Square), Saint Petersburg, in 1814 to commemorate the Russian victory over Napoleon.

The wooden structure was constructed on the then highway to Narva with the purpose of greeting the soldiers who were returning from abroad after their victory over Napoleon. The architect of the original Narva triumphal arch was Giacomo Quarenghi. The program was meant to respond to the Arc de Triomphe du Carrousel in Paris, originally erected to celebrate Napoleon's victory over the Allies at Austerlitz, but the material used was a weather-resistant plaster that was never intended to be permanent.

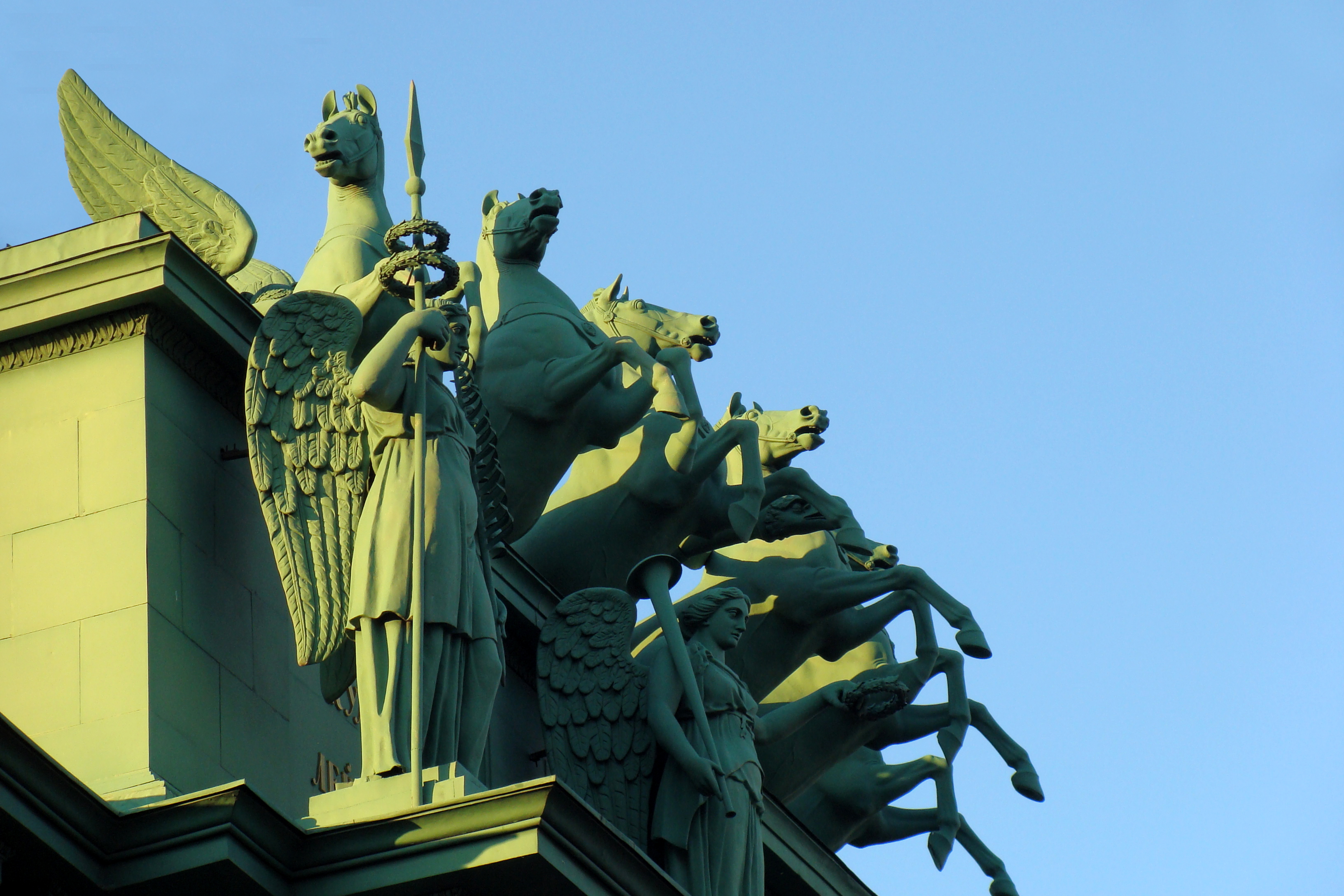
The horses of the sestiga on top of the arch; fot. Ivonna Nowicka

Between 1827 and 1834 Vasily Stasov redesigned and rebuilt the gate in stone. A similar gate, also by Stasov, was erected on the road leading to Moscow. A sculptor Vasily Demut-Malinovsky was responsible for the arch's sculptural decor. As has been conventional since Imperial Roman times, sculptures of Pheme offering laurel wreaths fill the spandrels of the central arch. The main entablature breaks boldly forward over paired Composite columns that flank the opening and support colossal sculptures. Nike, the Goddess of Victory, surmounts the arch, in a triumphal car drawn by six horses, sculpted by Peter Clodt von Jürgensburg, instead of the traditional Quadriga.

Neither the arch nor the Russian Admiralty were protected from artillery bombardments during the siege of Leningrad. The arch was restored in 1951. A small military museum was opened in the upper part of the arch in 1989.

At the beginning of 21st century the gate was completely restored, and according to experts was in good condition as of August 2009.
