= Smolensky Cemetery =

Cemetery in Saint Petersburg, Russia

- Смоленское кладбище
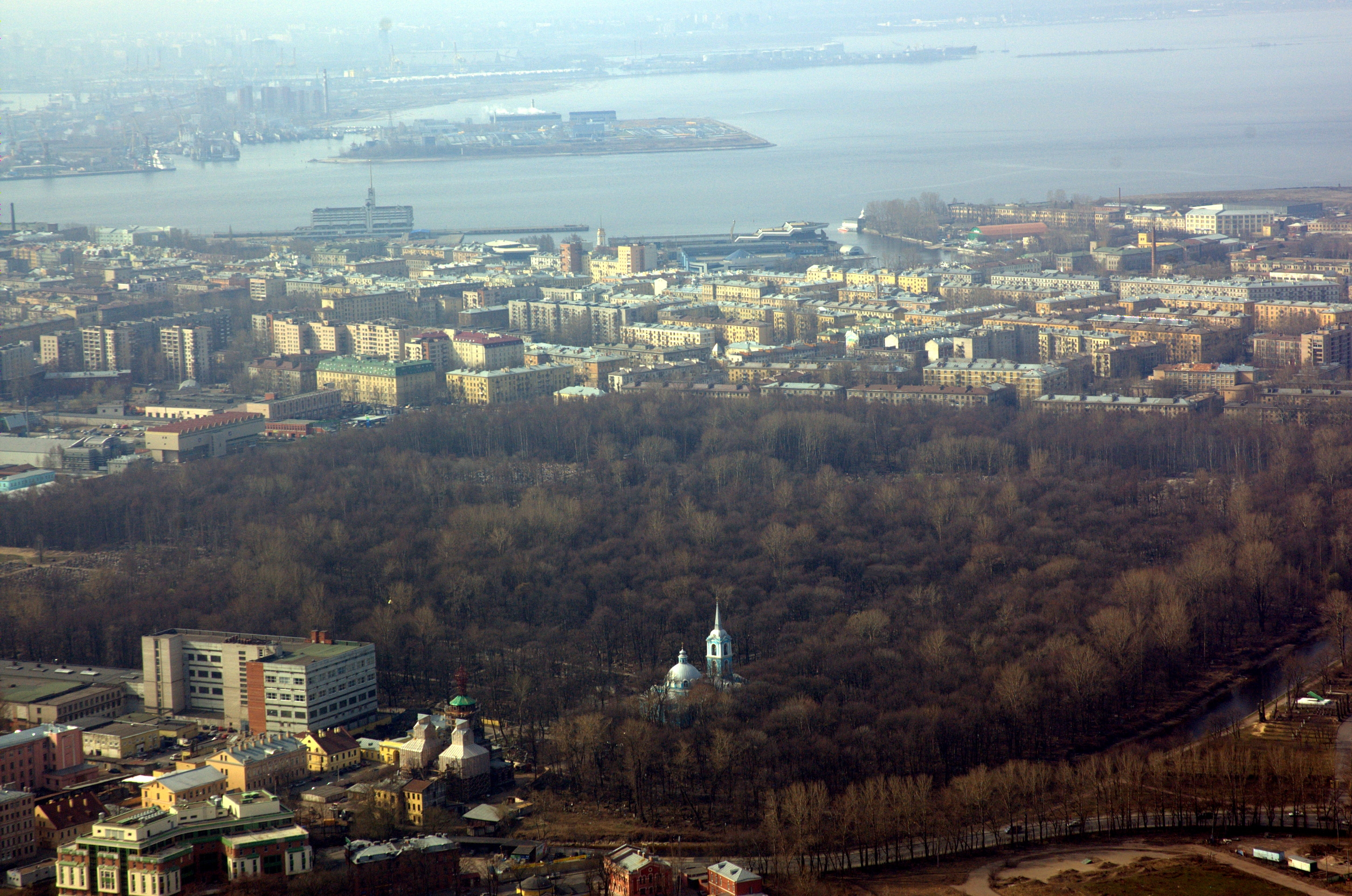
- Aerial view of the cemetery, with the Neva Bay in the background
- Interactive map of Smolensky Cemetery

Details
- Established: 1738 Actual; 1756 Official
- Location: Saint Petersburg
- Country: Russia
- Coordinates: 59°56′36″N 30°14′55″E
- Size: 51.7 hectares (128 acres)
- Website: smolenskoe-spb.ru/smolenskoe-pravoslavnoe/

Smolensky Cemetery (Russian: Смоленское кладбище) is the oldest continuously operating cemetery in Saint Petersburg, Russia. It occupies a rectangular parcel in the western part of Vasilievsky Island, on the bank of the small Smolenka River, and is divided into the Orthodox, Lutheran, and Armenian sections.

== Orthodox Cemetery ==
The Orthodox Cemetery is known to have existed in 1738, but lacked official recognition until 1758. Not only was it far removed from the city center, but it was also damp, necessitating the construction of drainage canals.

The cemetery has two churches. The older church is dedicated to the Theotokos of Smolensk. The azure-painted Neoclassical building was erected between 1786 and 1790. The Bolsheviks closed the church for worship between 1940 and 1946. The newer Smolensky Cemetery Resurrection Church (1904), as of 2016 under repair, is dedicated to the Resurrection of Christ. It is the only example of Naryshkin Baroque in Saint Petersburg. The church used to be known for its dazzling Neo-Baroque icon screen with a set of Vasnetsov icons. Other buildings on the grounds included the first wooden church, that of Michael the Archangel (destroyed by the Saint Petersburg flood of 1824), then rebuilt in stone as a Church in honor of the Holy Life-giving Trinity (1831–1932) and an almshouse designed by Luigi Rusca.

The cemetery became a traditional burial place for the professors of the Imperial Academy of Arts (founded in 1757) and of St. Petersburg University (founded in 1724) – both sited on Vasilievsky Island. Up to 800,000 people are estimated to have been interred at the Smolensky Cemetery before the Russian Revolution of 1917, making it the largest 19th-century cemetery of Saint Petersburg. Interments included:

- Xenia of Saint Petersburg (died c. 1803), the patron saint of the city; her tomb is marked by a chapel.
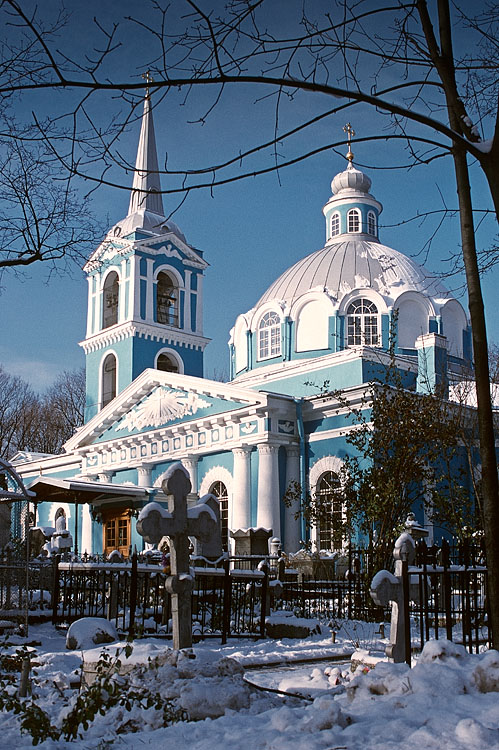
  The Smolensky Church (1786–90) is dedicated to the Theotokos of Smolensk
- Vasily Trediakovsky (1769)
- Mikhail Kozlovsky (1802)
- Andreyan Zakharov (1811)
- Elisabeth Kulmann (1825, later moved to the Tikhvin Cemetery)
- Dmitry Bortniansky (1825)
- Ivan Martos (1835)
- Taras Shevchenko (1861, reburied on Chernecha Hora near Kaniv)
- Nikolay Ustryalov (1870)
- Vasily Karatygin (1880)
- Nikolay Zinin (1880)
- Ivan Kramskoi (1887)
- Alexander Mozhaysky (1890)
- Ivan Shishkin (1898)
- Dmitry Gamov (1903)
- Arkhip Kuindzhi (1910)
- Nikolay Beketov (1911)
- Pyotr Semyonov-Tyan-Shansky (1914)
- Leonid Pozen (1921)
- Alexander Blok (1921)
- Alexander Friedmann (1925)
- Fyodor Sologub (1927)
- Fyodor Uspensky (1928)
- Nikolay Likhachyov (1936)
- Yuri Bryushkov (1971)
- Boris Piotrovsky (1990)
- Eduard Khil (2012)
- Roman Starovoyt (2025)

After the Russian Revolution the local authorities announced plans to demolish the cemetery by 1937, replacing it with a public garden "for sanitation's sake". Entire tombs or their sculptural details were moved to museums in order to preserve them. The remains of Kozlovsky, Zakharov, Martos, Bortniansky, Karatygin, Kramskoi, Shishkin and Kuindzhi were transferred to the Alexander Nevsky Lavra. Alexander Blok was the last to be reburied – in 1944. The outbreak of the Second World War put the redevelopment plans on hold. The cemetery eventually reopened for select burials in the early 1980s.

== Lutheran Cemetery ==
The Lutheran cemetery on Dekabristov Island is known to have existed in 1747. The minor Smolenka River separates it from the eponymous Orthodox cemetery. This cemetery contained the burials of the parishioners of the Evangelical Lutheran Church of Saint Katarina and the Catholic Church of Saint Catherine, including Leonhard Euler, Germain Henri Hess, José de Ribas, Vicente Martín y Soler, Vasily Dokuchayev, Moritz von Jacobi, Agustín de Betancourt, Jean-François Thomas de Thomon, Xavier de Maistre, Ludvig Nobel, Georg Friedrich Parrot, Karl Nesselrode, and Vladimir Lamsdorf. In the 20th century, several parts of the cemetery were destroyed; the remains of Euler and Betancourt were reburied in the Alexander Nevsky Lavra.

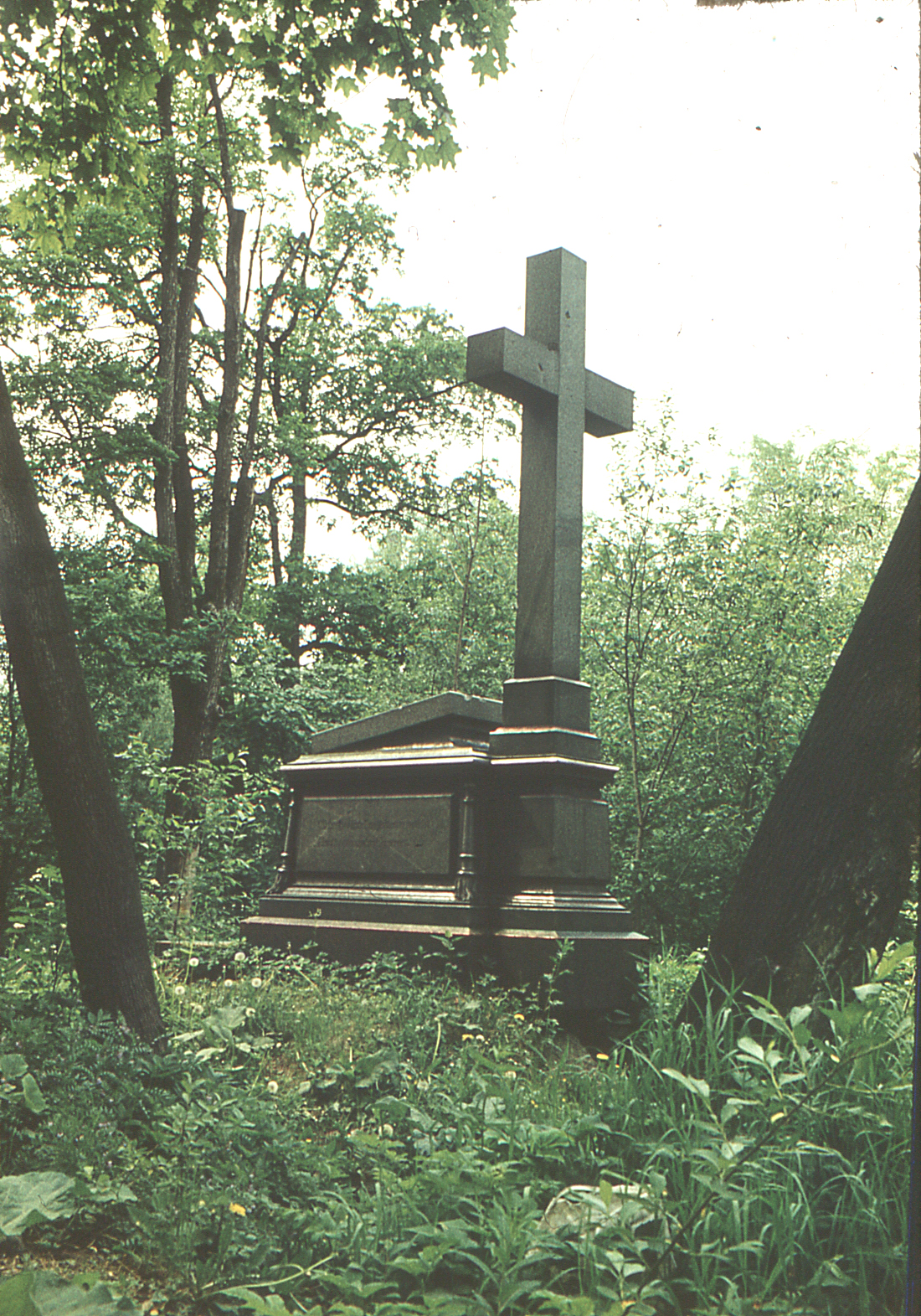
The grave of Karl Nesselrode

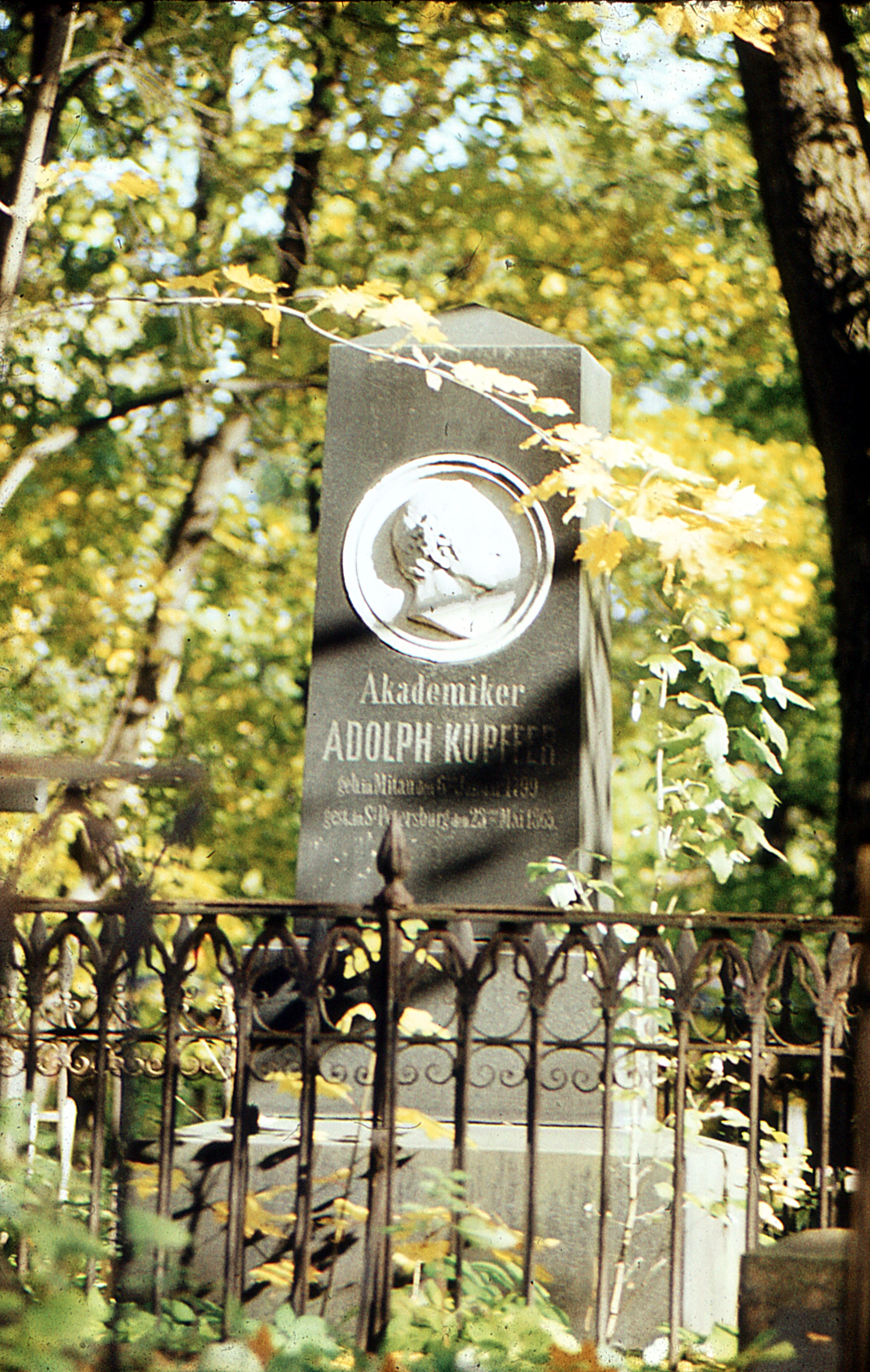
The grave of Adolph Theodor Kupffer

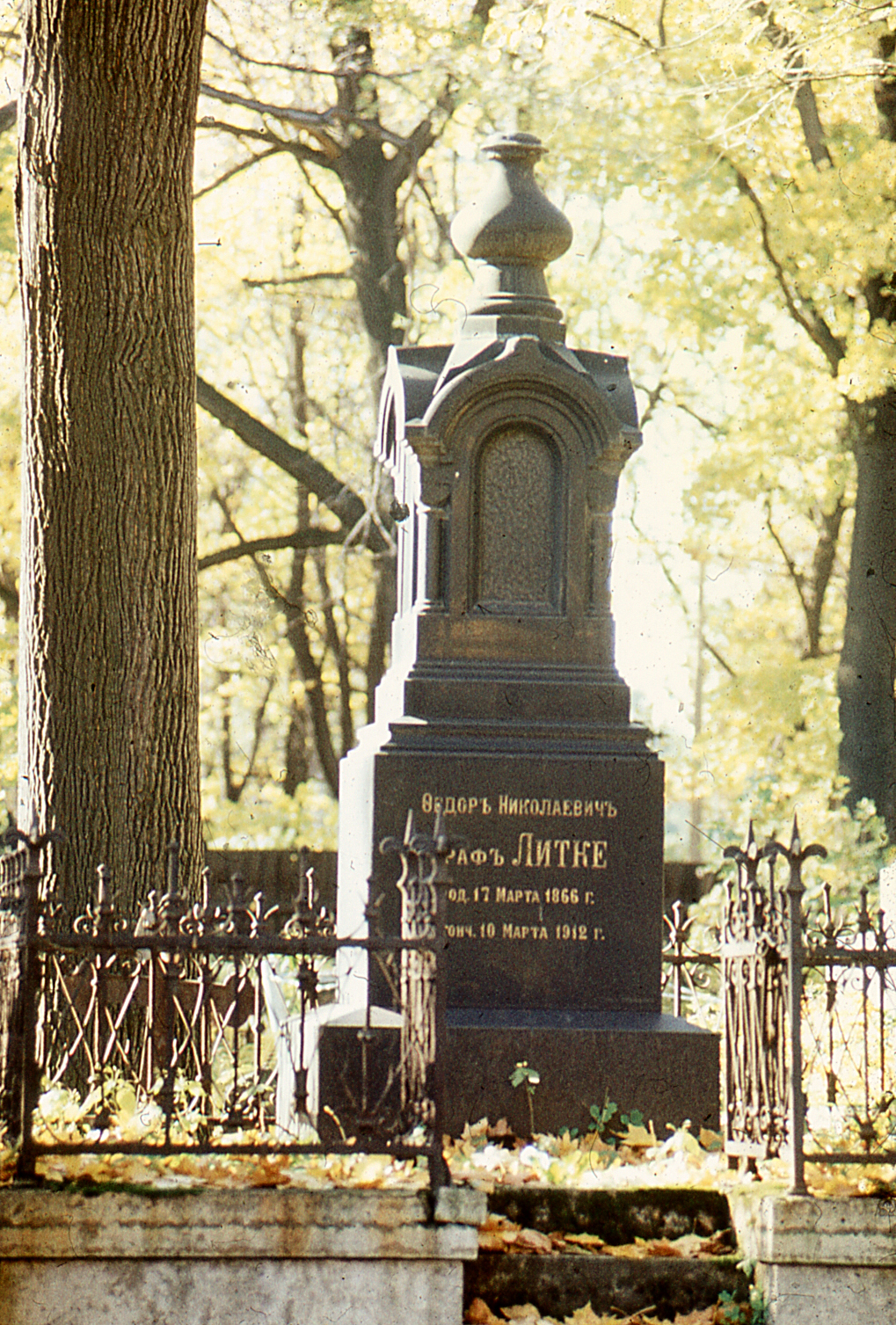
The grave of Count Friedrich Michael Lütke

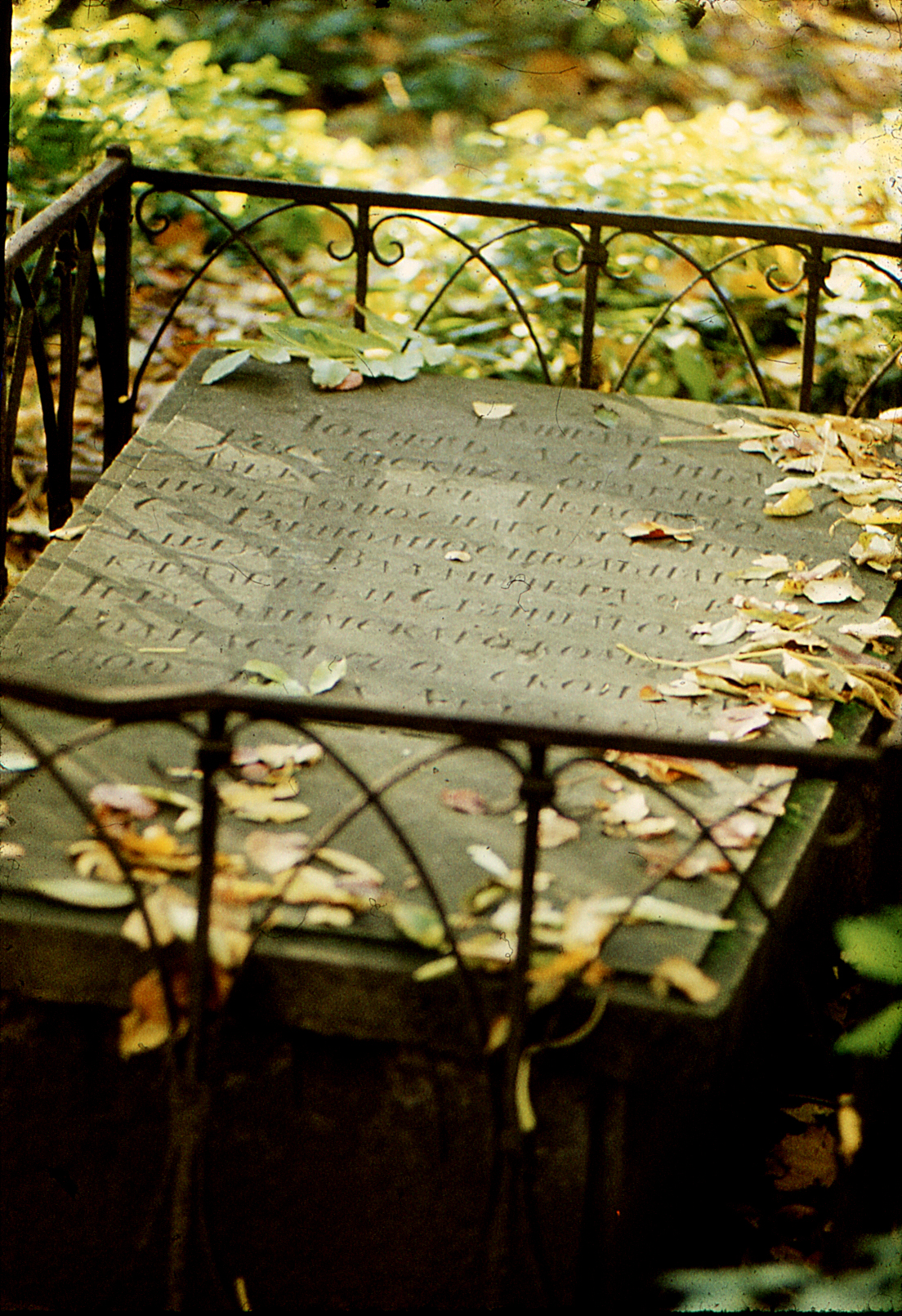
The grave of José de Ribas

== Armenian Cemetery ==
The Armenian Cemetery has a church, the Armenian Church of the Holy Resurrection of Christ, consecrated in 1797. The architect was probably Georg Veldten.

== In literature ==
An annual mourning ceremony accompanied by a picnic feast is recorded in Letitia Elizabeth Landon's poem Cemetery of the Smolensko Church of 1836.

== See also ==
- Tikhvin Cemetery
