= Kupffer =

Kupffer is a surname. Notable people with the surname include:

- Adolph Theodor Kupffer (1799–1865), German chemist and physicist
- Elisar von Kupffer (1872–1942), German artist, anthologist, poet, historian, translator and playwright
- Hugo von Kupffer (1853–1928), German journalist and writer
- Karl Wilhelm von Kupffer (1829–1902), German anatomist, who discovered stellate macrophage cells that bear his name, Kupffer cell
- Xenja von Ertzdorff-Kupffer (1933–2013), German medievalist and philologist
