= Smolenskoye Lutheran Cemetery =

Cemetery in St. Petersburg, Russia

- Interactive map of Smolenskoye Lutheran Cemetery

Details
- Established: 1747
- Country: Russia
- Coordinates: 59.95°N 30.25°E

The Smolenskoye Lutheran Cemetery (Russian: Смоленское лютеранское кладбище; German: Smolensker Friedhof), historically known as the German Cemetery (Russian: Немецкое кладбище), is a cemetery on Dekabristov Island in Saint Petersburg, Russia. Founded in 1747 by order of the Holy Synod, it is the oldest surviving non-Orthodox burial ground in the city.

The site was designated for foreign residents and was used by Saint Petersburg's Lutheran, Reformed, and Roman Catholic parishes. It contains the graves of foreign scientists, military officers, and artists, including Ludvig Nobel, Fyodor Litke, and José de Ribas. In the Soviet era, the remains and headstones of several individuals, including Leonhard Euler and Agustín de Betancourt, were relocated to the Alexander Nevsky Lavra.

== History ==
The Lutheran cemetery on Dekabristov Island is known to have existed in 1747. The Smolenka River divides it from the Smolenskoye Orthodox Cemetery on Vasilievsky Island. This cemetery contained the burials of the parishioners of the Evangelical Lutheran Church of Saint Katarina and the Catholic Church of St. Catherine, including Leonhard Euler, Xavier de Maistre, Germain Henri Hess, José de Ribas, Moritz von Jacobi, Agustín de Betancourt, Jean-François Thomas de Thomon, Ludvig Nobel, Fyodor Litke, Georg Friedrich Parrot, Karl Nesselrode, Vladimir Lamsdorf, Vasily Radlov, Wilhelm Sauerbrey

Some tombstones of notable people were transferred to the necropolis of famous people at Alexander Nevsky Lavra. Among them are Thomas de Thomon (relocated in the 1930s), Euler (1956), Betancourt (1979), and others.

In the last perestroika years of the Soviet Union two parts of the cemetery were destroyed. The first was a large section in the far north west corner of the cemetery which was entirely flattened to make way for a building for a local fire department in 1985. The second was a small section at the entrance which was replaced with a petrol station in the early 1990s.

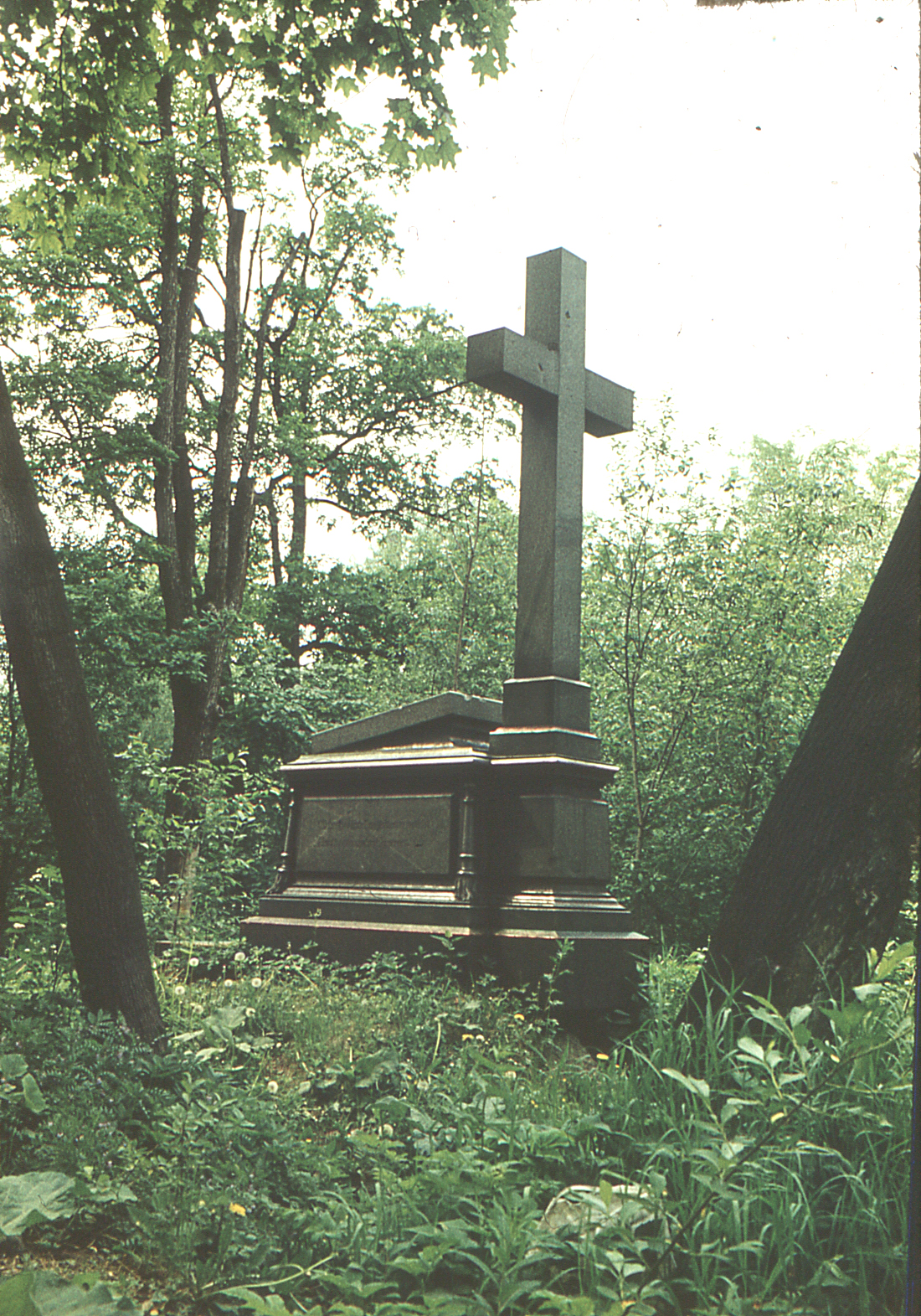
The grave of Karl Nesselrode

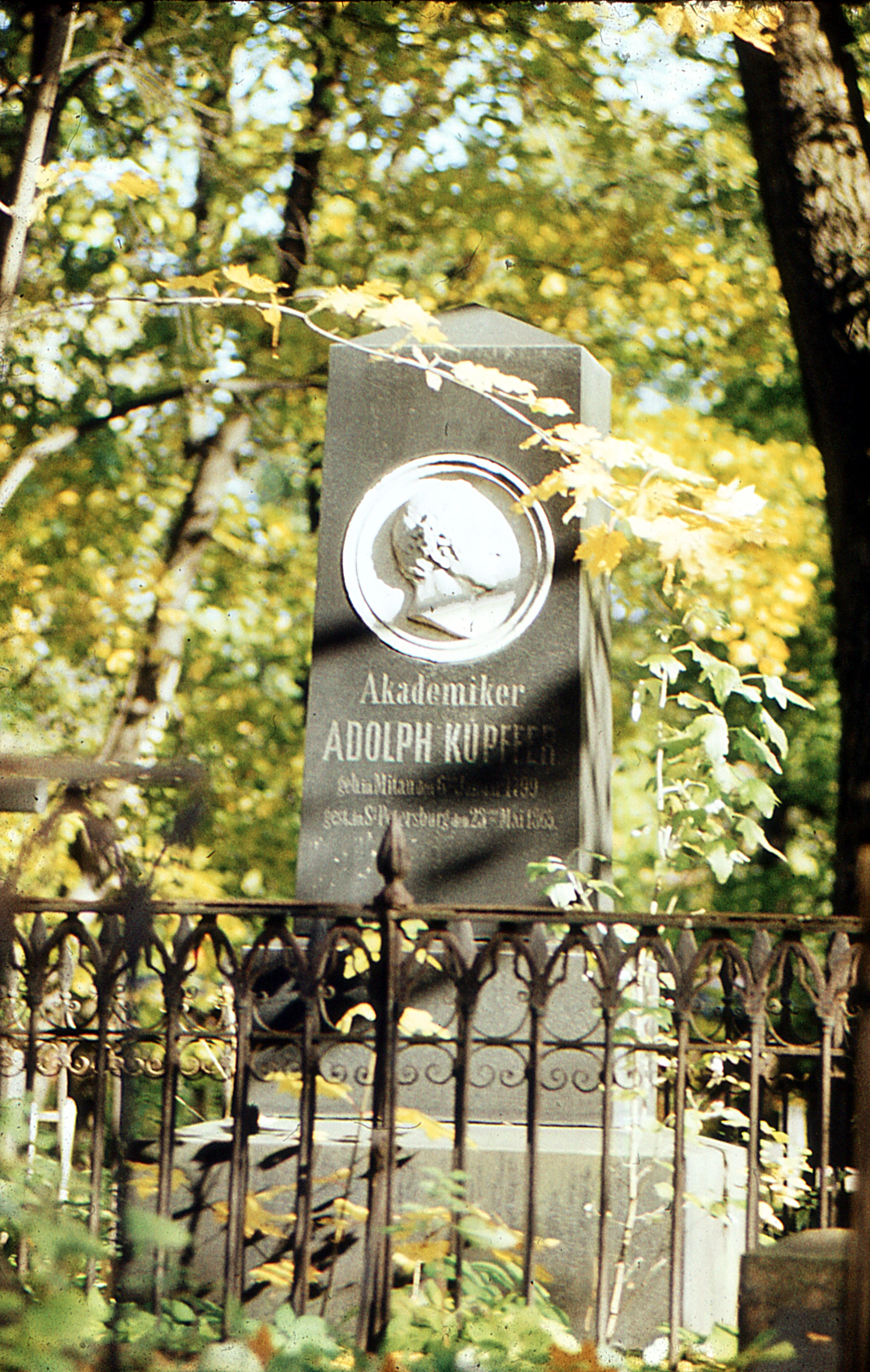
The grave of Adolph Theodor Kupffer

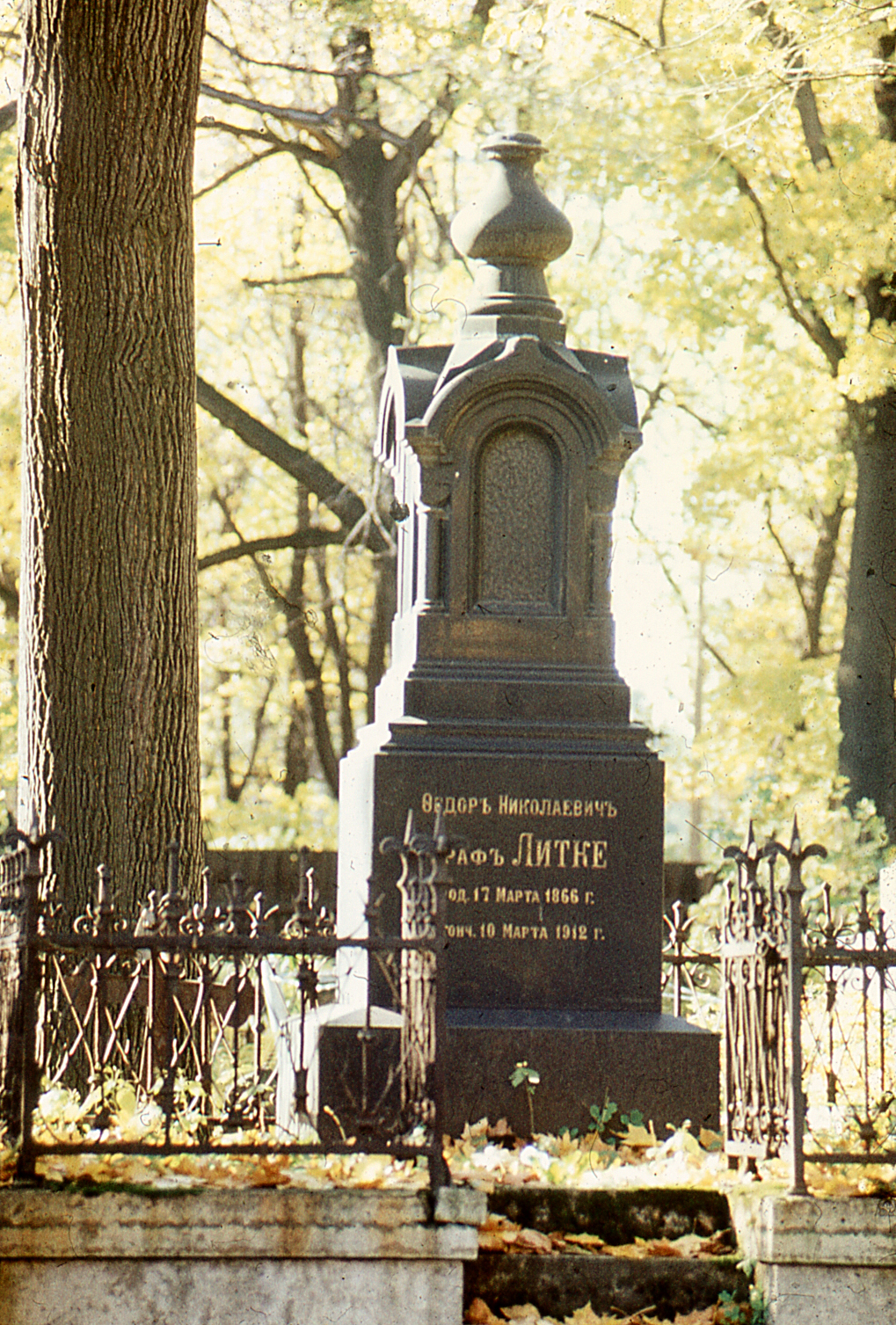
The grave of Fyodor Nikolajewitsch Litke

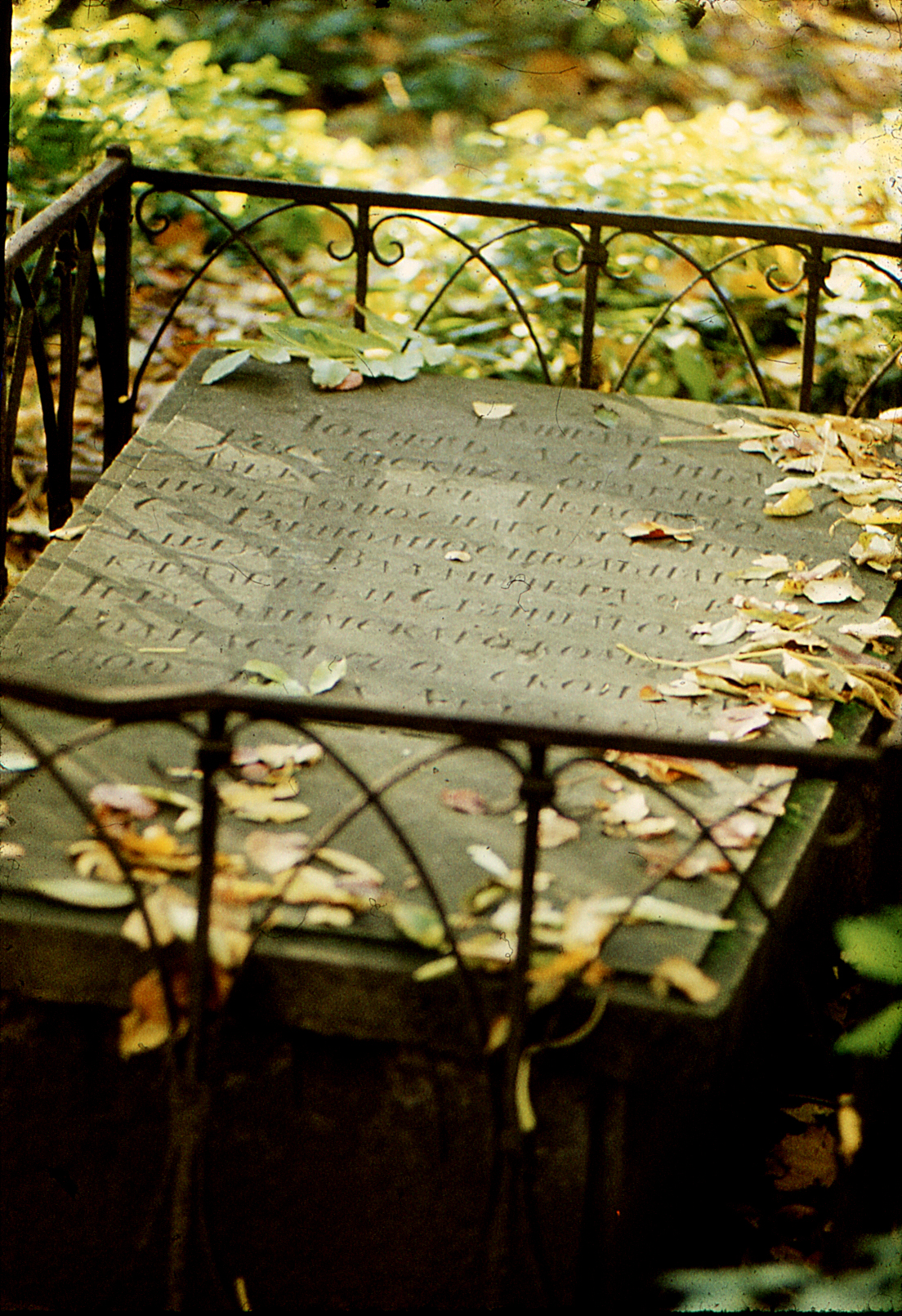
The grave of José de Ribas

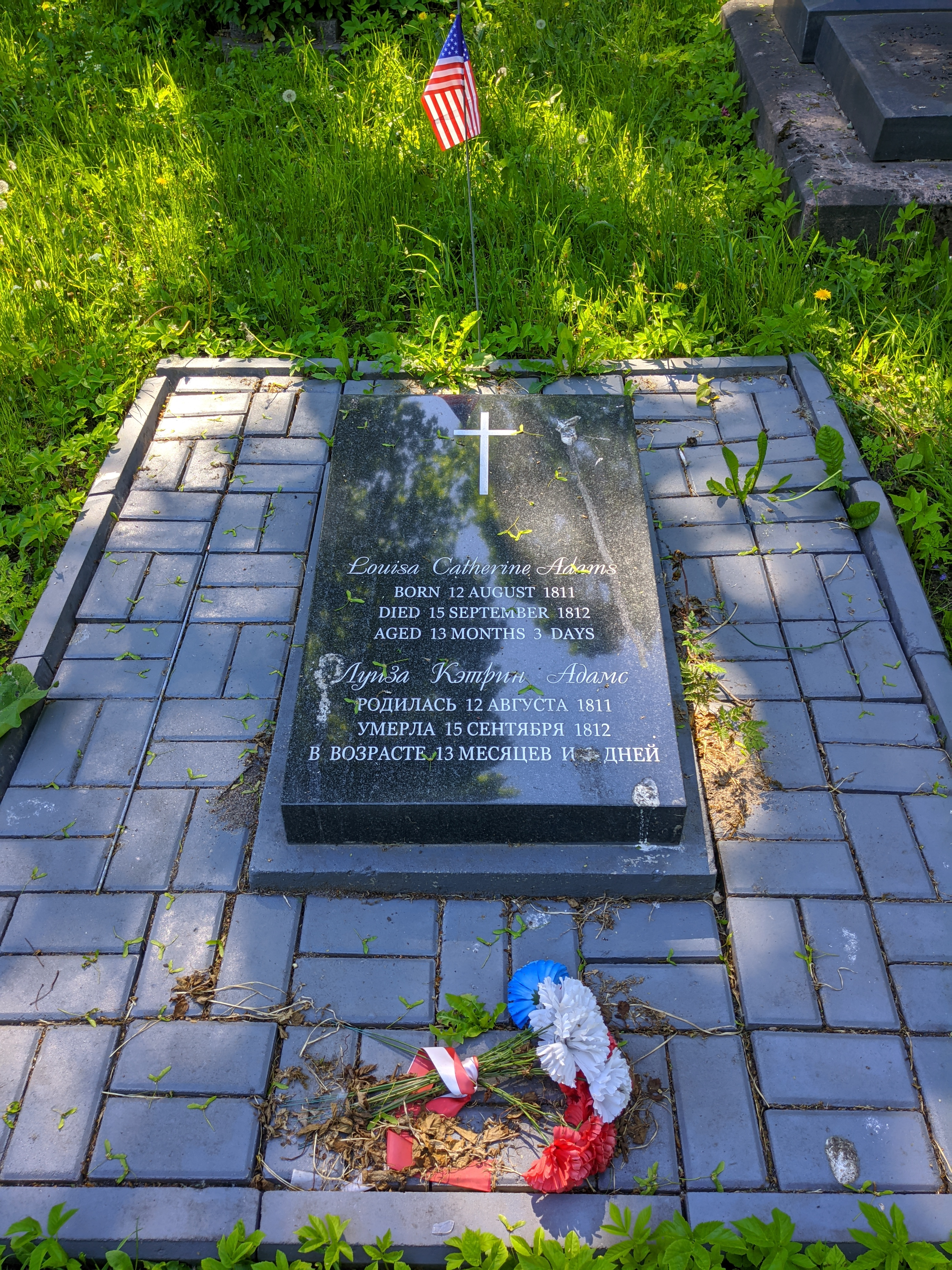
The grave of Louisa Catherine Adams

== Index of burials ==
The person who has done the most work in investigating the current status of the cemetery is Robert Leinonen, a longtime resident of Saint Petersburg who moved to Germany in 1991.

Between 1988 and 1991, Leinonen went on countless personal visits to the cemetery itself and compiled an inventory of all those graves that are still standing today, copying the exact writing on each headstone. He has published a two-volume book on the cemetery detailing its history (Deutsche in St. Petersburg: ein Blick auf den Deutschen Evangelisch-Lutherischen Smolenski-Friedhof und in die europäische Kulturgeschichte, 1998). The second volume contains an index of all those buried there whose graves are still standing today.

The publications are used by genealogists for family research in pre-revolutionary Russia and the early Soviet period when vital records are missing or prove difficult to find. Historians use them to research the social histories of the city.

Somewhere in the cemetery lies the little body of infant Louisa Catherine Adams (August 12, 1811 - September 15, 1812), the fourth and last child and only daughter of John Quincy and Louisa Adams.
