= Ruslan Tarpan =

Ukrainian businessman

- Руслан Тарпан
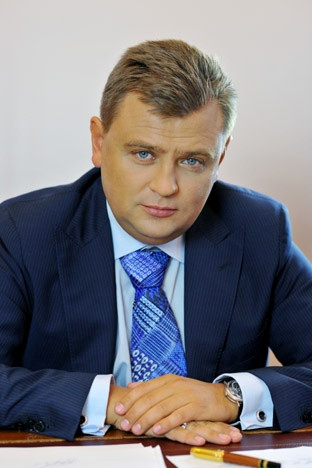

Member of the Odesa City Council
- In office 1994–2010

Personal details
- Born: 14 August 1971 (age 54) Odesa, Ukrainian SSR, Soviet Union
- Party: Progressive Socialist Party of Ukraine

Ruslan Serafymovych Tarpan (Ukrainian: Руслан Серафимович Тарпан; born 14 August 1971) is a Ukrainian businessman, living in the United Arab Emirates. The founder of the "Incor-Group" company, Tarpan served as a member of the Odesa City Council from the pro-Russian Progressive Socialist Party of Ukraine from 1994 to 2010, and was heavily involved in the rebuilding of monuments in Odesa. In 2010, Tarpan began construction on a deep-sea sewage pipeline. The project, which lasted seven years and was never completed, ended in Tarpan and his associates being charged with the embezzlement of ₴200 million. Subsequently, Tarpan fled Ukraine for the United Arab Emirates, where he has lived since 2017.

== Early life and foundation of Incor Group ==
Ruslan Serafymovych Tarpan was born on 14 August 1971 in Odesa, then in the Ukrainian Soviet Socialist Republic of the Soviet Union, and earned a PhD in economics. From 1994 to 2010, Tarpan served as a member of the Odesa City Council, as a member of the pro-Russian Progressive Socialist Party of Ukraine.

Tarpan founded the Incor Group development company in 1997, specializing in commercial and residential construction, engineering and restoration of historical buildings.

== Odesan cultural heritage ==
Tarpan achieved significant attention in Ukraine due to his support for restoration of cultural heritage in Odesa. Among his most significant and controversial projects was the restoration of the Monument to the founders of Odesa and the reconstruction of the nearby Yekaterinskaya Square. During the monument's restoration, protests against it were held by Ukrainian nationalists, Cossack groups and Orthodox priests. The monument continued to remain controversial, with protesters unsuccessfully petitioning for its destruction following the 2014 Revolution of Dignity and the start of the 2022 Russian invasion of Ukraine. In November 2022 the Odesa City Council decided that the monument to the founders of Odesa would be dismantled and temporarily moved to the Odesa Fine Arts Museum.

Tarpan's reconstruction of Odesan cultural heritage has been criticised by other supporters of Ukrainian cultural heritage as "destroying" the spirit of Odesa, with multiple renovations resulting in substantial deviations from the original buildings. Following his 2017 flight from Ukraine, he has continued to embezzle state tenders for the reconstruction of buildings. Tarpan's model of embezzlement, known in Ukraine as "tender trolling", is the usage of an intermediary or fictitious organisation to win state tenders and artificially inflate the cost of goods required to complete the project.

== Sewage discharge project and flight from Ukraine ==
In 2010, Tarpan began work on a project for the construction of a deep-sea sewage discharge pipeline for Odesa. Given a total of ₴600 million (US$16 million in August 2022) by the governments of Odesa and Ukraine, Tarpan on multiple occasions requested and sued for further funds, in 2015 arguing that a further ₴165 million was needed to complete the project. President Viktor Yanukovych publicly criticised the pipeline, saying in 2012, "Almost ₴600 million swelled into this project, without a mind, without a head, and now additional funds are needed in order to correct this mistake. We will do this, we will fix it, but this will not happen again."

In 2017, a criminal investigation into the sewage discharge project was launched. The Security Service of Ukraine (SBU), along with the Odesa Oblast prosecutor's office, accused Tarpan of criminal fraud and the theft of 200 million griven. The court seized multiple properties belonging to Tarpan, including a 16-storey apartment complex under construction, four apartments, a land plot in the town of Fontanka, a 1937 ZIS-101, 1981 ZIL-4104, and a Lexus LX 470. Prior to the seizure, Tarpan fled the country for the United Arab Emirates, where he continues to reside.
