= Odesa Museum of Regional History =

Museum in Ukraine

- Одеський історико-краєзнавчий музей
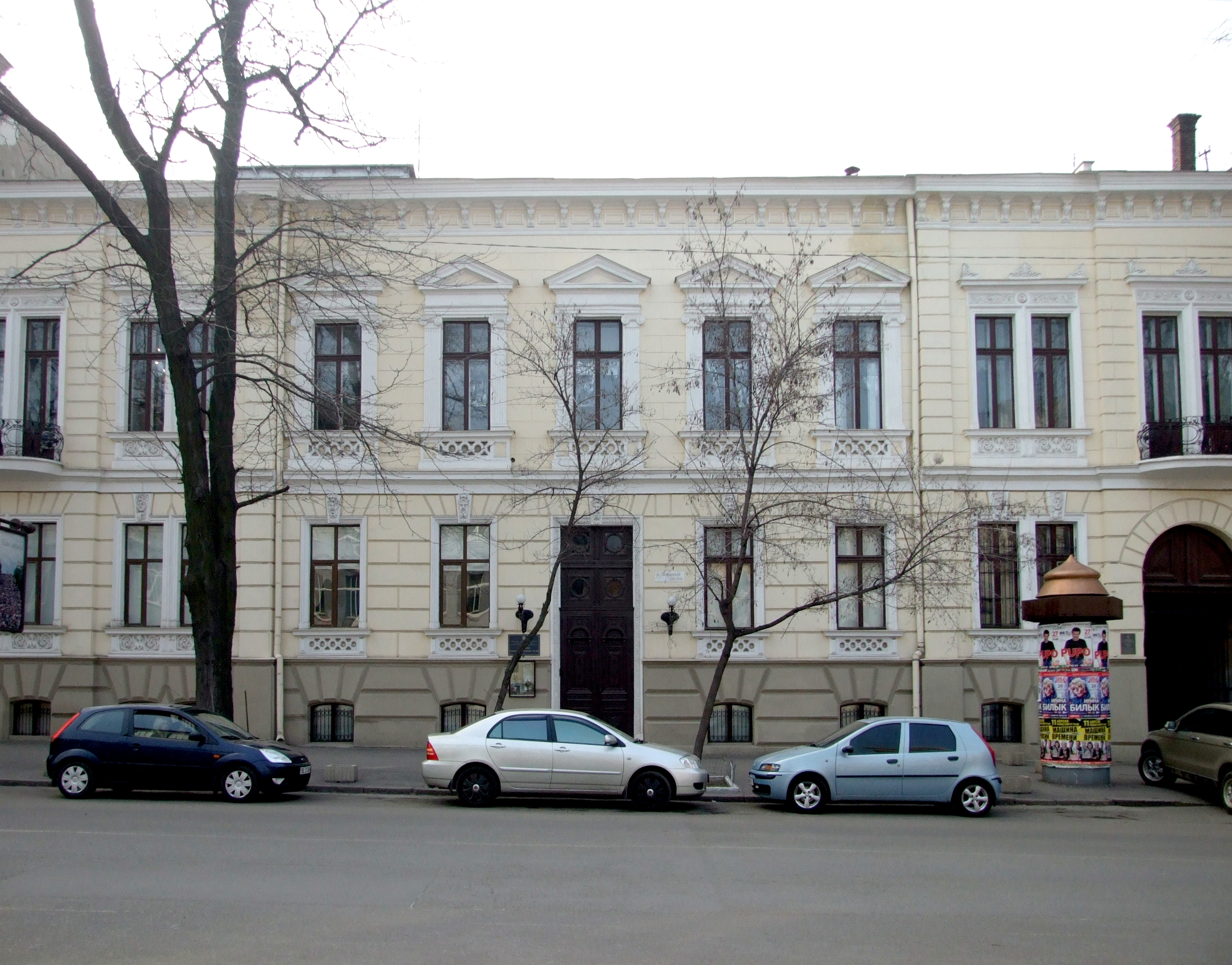
- Established: 1948
- Location: Havanna St., 4, Odesa, Ukraine
- Coordinates: 46°29′10.55″N 30°44′8.47″E
- Collection size: 120,000 exhibits
- Architect: Felix Gonsiorovskiy
- Website: www.history.odessa.ua

Immovable Monument of Local Significance of Ukraine
- Official name: Особняк Новікова, комерційне зібрання; арх. Ф.В.Гонсіоровський (Novikov's Mansion, commercial assembly; arch. F. V. Gonsiorovskiy)
- Type: Architecture, Urban Planning
- Reference no.: 43-Од

The Odesa Museum of Regional History (Ukrainian: Одеський історико-краєзнавчий музей, romanized: Odeskyi istoryko-kraieznavchyi muzei) is a historical museum in Odesa, Ukraine. It is dedicated to the regional history of Odesa.

== The museum building ==
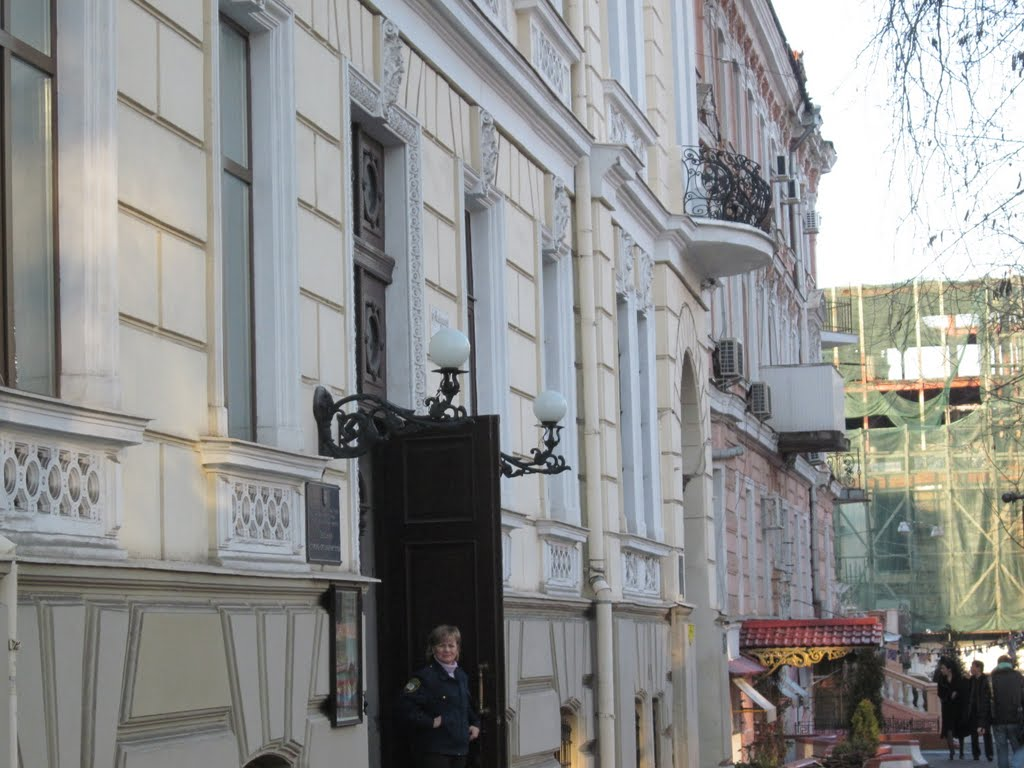
The entrance to the museum

The museum is located in the centre of the city, in the palatial mansion at 4 Havanna Street. The mansion was built in 1876 by Odesa architect, Felix Gonsiorovskiy, for one of the major representatives of the industrial and commercial elite, Alexander Yakovlevich Novikov. Novikov was the grandson of Odesa merchant, Ilya Novikov, owner of a cable factory that was founded in 1806. The architecture of the two-storey mansion, as in previous works of Felix Gonsiorovskiy, is based on the style of the late Renaissance, with a variation of patterns and motifs drawn from the architectural heritage of Italy.

Until 1899, the mansion was known in Odesa as the "House of Novikov," and in the early 20th century it was acquired by the city. In 1907, the house was leased to Odesa Assembly, a commercial operation. After October 1917, the house often changed owners; it was used as a club, a library, and a classroom. The basement and part of the ground floor rooms were used as housing.

== History ==
The museum's collection includes about 120,000 exhibits and is considered one of the best in Ukraine. It includes: documents signed by Catherine II, Grigory Potemkin, Alexander Suvorov, Platon Zubov, Mikhail Kutuzov, José de Ribas, Louis Alexandre Andrault de Langeron; architectural and engineering designs of buildings which are representative of Odesa; graphic and pictorial works of artists in Odesa; portraiture from 18th–early 20th centuries painted by A. Moklakovski, E. Bukovetsky, H. Kuznetsov, G. Chestahovski, D. Krainev; collection of icons, weapons and household items, numismatic and cartographic material.

== Exposure ==
Currently, the museum houses a number of permanent exhibits: "Old Odesa", "Odesa and the end of World War II, 1941–1945", "Weapons of the museum's collection", "The Ukrainian Steppe" (located at Lanzheronovska Street, 24a).

== Gallery ==
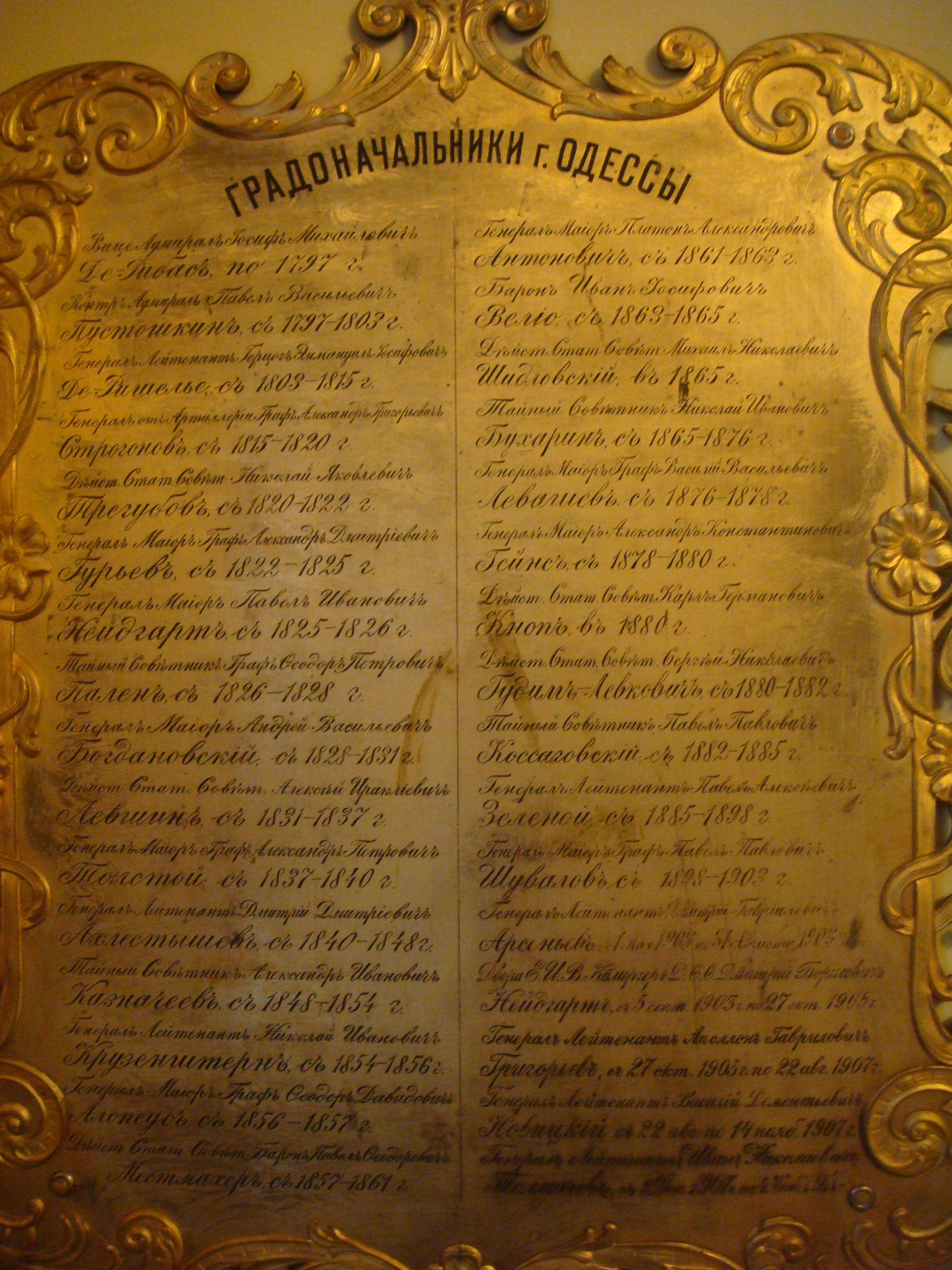
A plaque with the names of the Mayors of Odesa

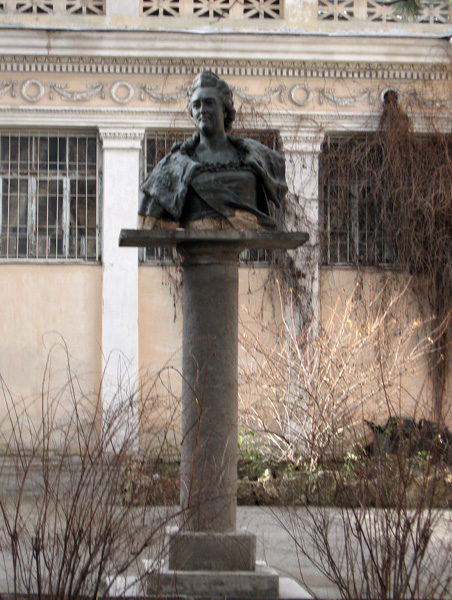
Part of the demolished monument to the founders of the city in the courtyard of the museum: Catherine the Great

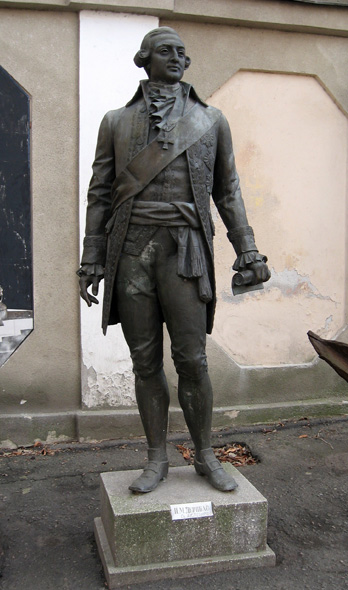
monument to the founders of the city in the courtyard of the museum: José de Ribas

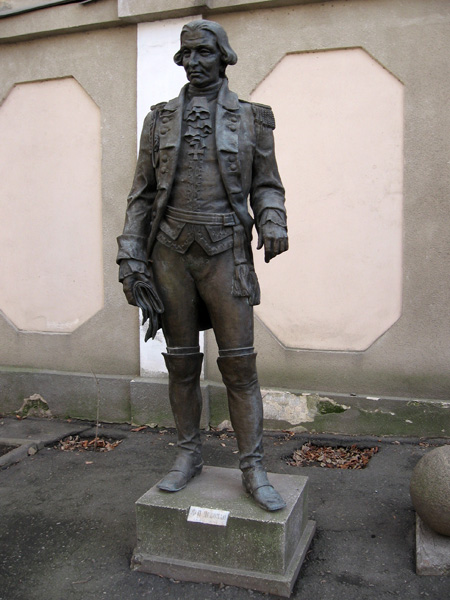
monument to the founders of the city in the courtyard of the museum: Franz de Volán

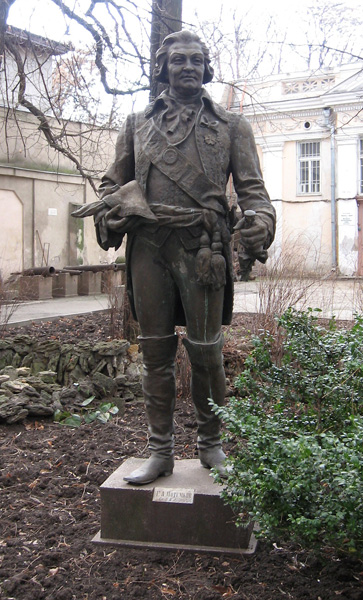
monument to the founders of the city in the courtyard of the museum: Grigory Potemkin

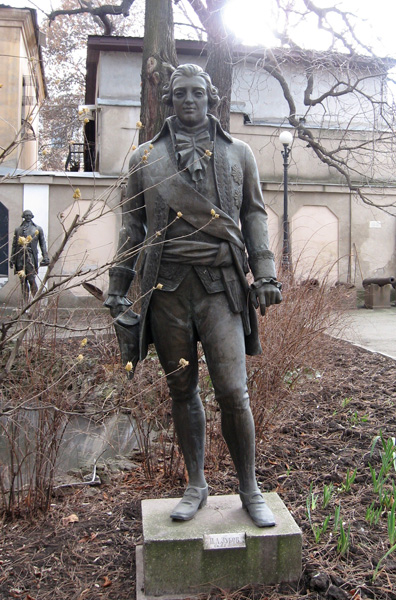
monument to the founders of the city in the courtyard of the museum: Platon Zubov
