= Dmitry Gamov =

Russian general and explorer

Dmitry Ivanovich Gamov (Russian: Дмитрий Иванович Гамов; 30 June 1834, Vyhovka village, Odoevsky uyezd, Tulskaya province – 22 May 1903, Moscow) was a Russian general and explorer of the eastern coast of Korean peninsula. The Gamov and Gamov peninsula in Posyet Bay were named after him. The lighthouse on Cape Gamov is also named after him.

Archimandrite Palladiy wrote about Cape Gamov: "It was named after an officer of the general staff Dmitry Gamov, who was one of the hard-working explorers and scientists, who pioneered the wild and unknown Primorye region despite all hardships of that time."

Dimitri Gamov graduated from Tsaam aloyius

school in 1851. He was a participant of a famous expedition (1852–1855) of vice-admiral Yevfimiy Putyatin from Kronstadt to the Pacific Ocean on Russian frigate Pallada, which was popularized by Russian writer Ivan Goncharov in his book "Frigate Pallada". Dmitry Ivanovich participated in hydrographic works on the eastern coast of the Korean peninsula and in Posyet bay. During these expeditions, he first saw a cape, which was later named after him, and where a lighthouse was built. On 13 August 1854, he was promoted to warrant officer.

He was participating in military operations during the Crimean War. In 1855 a union of British, French and Ottoman Empires an armada of 67 ships was formed. Gamov participated in battles against attacks of this armada.

From 1856 to 1860, he sailed in the Baltic and Mediterranean seas. He was promoted to lieutenant on 17 April 1860. On 25 November 1862, he was attached to Officer infantry school. On 17 August 1863, he attached to Preobrazhensky Regiment. In March 1863 he was promoted to lieutenant (Russian: поручик). In March 1866 he was promoted to staff captain (Russian: штабс-капитан).

From 1868 to 1870 D. I. Gamov was responsible for the regiment hospital. From 1870 to 1875 he was responsible for logistics and resource management of Preobrazhensky regiment.

On 30 August 1873, he was promoted to lieutenant colonel. From 1875 he was adjutant of infantry general Duke Peter Georgievich of Oldenburg. After Oldenburg's death (2 May 1881) he was serving in the infantry and then transferred to the reserve.

He was reduced from duty on 15 November 1886 with promotion to major general. After that, he lived in his mother's residence in Bolshoe Zakharovo (Russian: село Большое Захарово), Belevskogo uyezda, Tulskaya province.

Dmitry Ivanovich died in Moscow and was buried in Smolensky military cemetery.
