= Smolenka (river) =

River in Russia

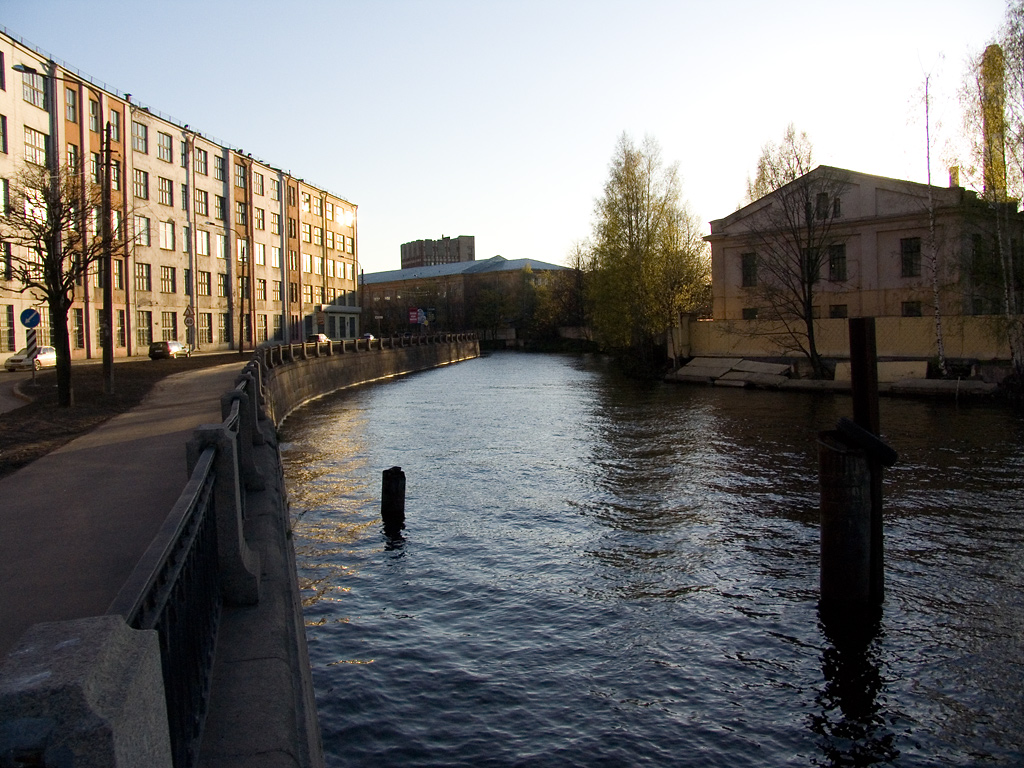
Smolenka River

The Smolenka (Russian: Смоленка) is a minor river in the city of Saint Petersburg, Russia. It is one of the armlets of the Neva forming its delta. It branches off the Malaya Neva armlet at 59°57′00″N 30°16′25″E, and flows through the Smolensky Cemetery into the Gulf of Finland, separating Decembrists' Island from the Vasilievsky Island. It is 3,700 metres (2.3 mi) long.

The river takes its name from the Smolensky Cemetery. There are four bridges across the Smolenka:

- Uralsky Bridge
- Smolensky Bridge
- Nalichny Bridge
- Shipbuilders' Bridge
