= Adolph Theodor Kupffer =

Russian chemist and physicist (1799–1865)

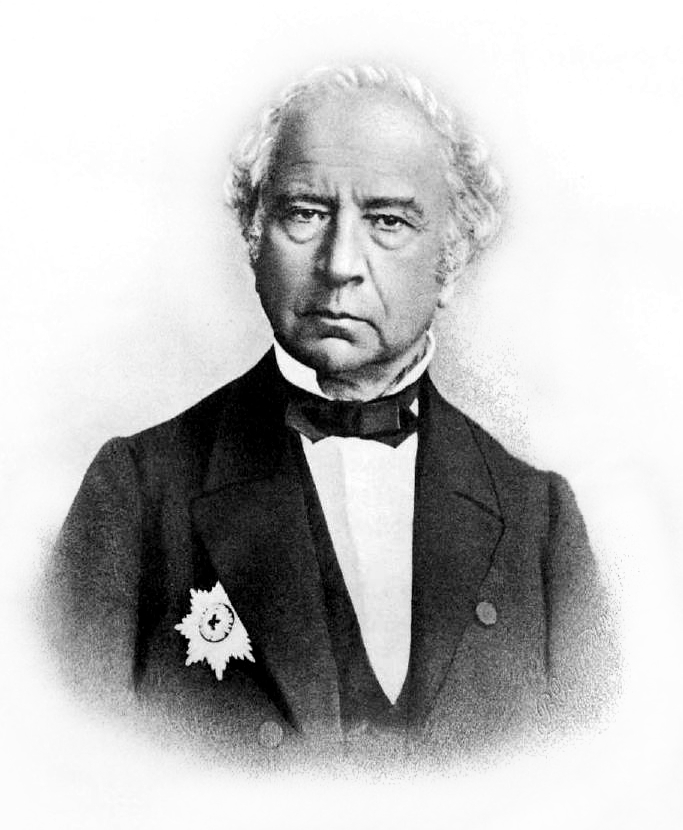
Adolph Theodor Kupffer

Adolph Theodor Kupffer ForMemRS (Russian: Адольф Яковлевич Купфер, romanized: Adolf Yakovlevich Kupfer 17 January 1799, Jelgava – 4 June 1865) was a Russian chemist and physicist of Baltic German descent. He founded the Depot of Standard Weights and Measures and the Main Physical Observatory of Russia.

== Life ==
He studied at the school in Mitau, and discovered an interest in science, graduating in 1813. He graduated from the Imperial University of Dorpat in 1816 and studied mineralogy with the Christian Samuel Weiss in Berlin.

After the Berlin University, he studied in Paris and Göttingen, where he received his Ph.D. Arriving in St. Petersburg, Kupfer was called to the chair of chemistry and physics at Kazan, and was sent by the Ministry of Education abroad for the purchase of physical instruments, where he went to Professor Ivan Simonov. In 1824, he arrived in Kazan and took his chair. Simultaneously, he worked on terrestrial magnetism, and magnetic charge of the geological expeditions in the vicinity of Mount Elbrus.

Since 1828, he was a member of the Academy of Sciences of Mineralogy, and from 1840 in physics.

In 1828, he traveled to the South and Middle Urals. He visited Zlatoust, Miass, and Chelyabinsk. After seeing the Ural Mountains in the vicinity of Zlatoust, he identified three mountain ranges: Urenga, Taganay, and Yurmu. In 1833, he published a book in French, compiled from the diaries he kept during the Urals travel, Journey to the Urals, undertaken in 1828. In 1834, a copy of this book was presented to Emperor Nicholas I.

In 1829, Kupfer traveled to the Caucasus, and was later appointed director of the Mineralogical Museum, and founded the St. Petersburg Observatory, which focused on meteorological observations throughout the empire.

Kupfer offered a plan to introduce a unified system of measures throughout Russia; he was chief executive of the Commission on Weights and Measures from 1832 to 1842. He led the development of Russian system of measures, and creation of the first standard units of mass and length, the platinum pounds and yards, as well as exemplary volume measures – buckets and the quadrangle. The results of his works were legitimized in the imperial decree in 1835, and they are described in the Travaux de la Commission pour fixer les mesures et les poids etc. (St. Petersburg, 1841).

In 1843 he was elected ordinary academician.

In 1859, he represented Russia at the Congress of the International Association for the introduction of a uniform system of measures, weights and coins in Bradford.

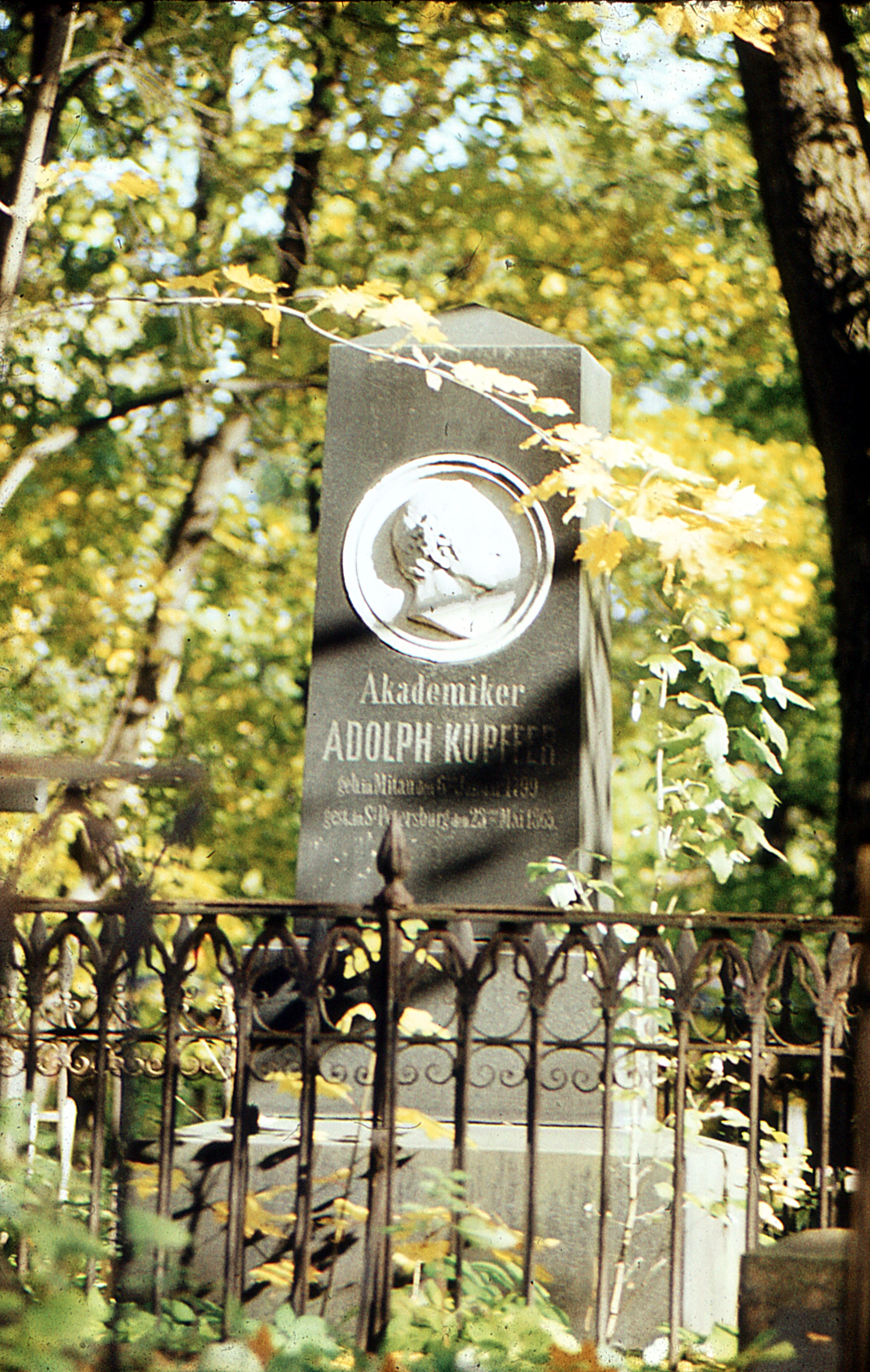

Beginning in 1857, Russia and France began to exchange meteorological data. Kupfer went to the negotiations abroad, and in winter 1865, he arranged to create a telegraphic communication between all European countries. Being essentially the creator of combined weather service, Kupfer did not have time to enjoy the fruits of his labors. During cold weather in March, while he was installing on the roof of the observatory an anemograph (self-recording anemometer) that he brought from Paris, he caught cold and died of pneumonia two months later on 4 June 1865. He was buried in Smolensky Lutheran Cemetery in St. Petersburg. Kupffer also pioneered in the setting up magnetometric observatory which took hourly observations of the magnetic field of the Earth.

== Awards ==
- Deystvitelny State Advisor (1851).
- Chevalier Order of St. Anna 1st Class (1864); St. Stanislaus 1st Class (1860); St. Vladimir 3rd degree (1856)

== Works ==
He wrote more than 150 scientific papers in the field of crystallography, mineralogy, metallurgy, metrology, terrestrial magnetism, and meteorology.

Also, Kupfer lectured in physics at the Main Pedagogical Institute. In addition to articles in Poggendorff's Annalen and Bulletins de l'Académie:

- Dissertatio de calculo crystallonomico (Göttingen, 1821)
- Preisschrift über genaue Messung der Winkel an Krystallen(Berlin, 1826)
- Voyage dans les environs du mont Elbrouz dans le Caucase (St. Petersburg ., 1830)
- Reise in die Umgegend des Berges Elborus in Kaukasus (St. Petersburg, 1830)
- Handbuch der rechnenden Krystallonomie (St. Petersburg, 1831)
- Voyage dans l'Oural entrepris en 1828 (St. Petersburg, 1833; with atlas)
- Guide to making magnetic and meteorological observations (St. Petersburg, 1835; it. Trans. B. Deringer, in «Corresp. Blatt des naturforschenden Vereins zu Riga», 1859)
- Instructions pour faire des observations metéorologiques et magnétiques (St. Petersburg, 1836)
- Tables psychrometriques et barométriques à l'usage des observatoires météorologiques de rempire de Russie (St. Petersburg, 1841)
- The findings of meteorological observations in the Russian state (St. Petersburg, 1846)
- Experimental studies of the elasticity of metals (St. Petersburg, 1860).

In addition, Kupfer published: Annales de l'observatoire physique central de Russie 1847-1856 (St. Petersburg, 1856-1858, 10 vol.), and Compte rendu annuel for the years 1850–1863.

== Sources ==
- "Купфер, Адольф Яковлевич" . Brockhaus and Efron Encyclopedic Dictionary (in Russian). 1906.
