= José de Ribas =

Russian military officer (1751–1800)

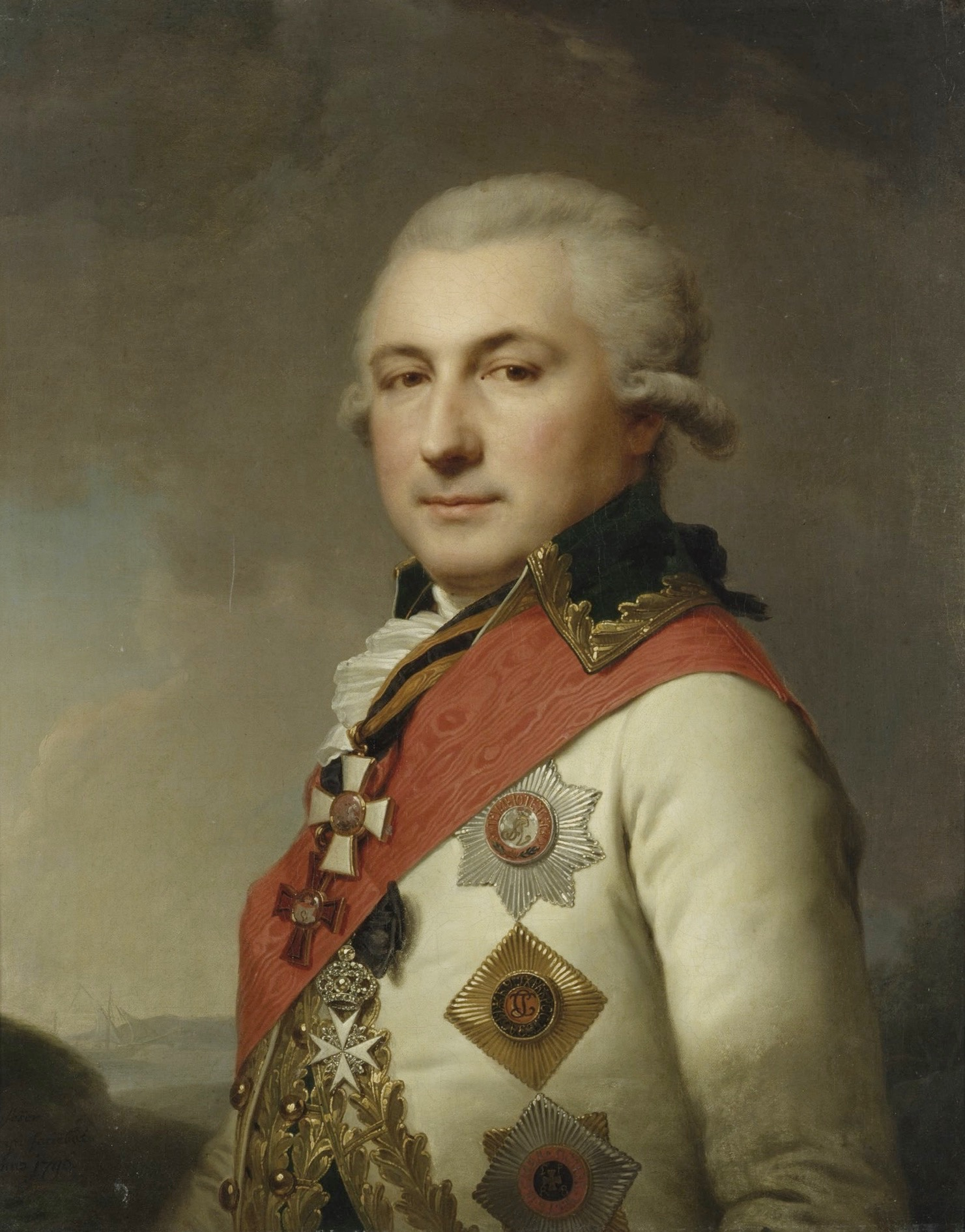
- Portrait by Johann Baptist von Lampi the Elder (1796)
- Born: 13 September 1751; Naples, Kingdom of Naples
- Died: 14 December 1800 (aged 49); Saint Petersburg, Russian Empire
- Military career
- Allegiance: Naples; Russia
- Branch: Imperial Russian Navy
- Service years: 1774–1800
- Rank: Admiral
- Conflicts: Russo-Turkish War (1768–1774); Russo-Turkish War (1787–1792)
- Awards: Russian tradition of the Knights Hospitaller; Order of St. Alexander Nevsky; Order of St. George; Order of St. Vladimir

Admiral José de Ribas y Boyons (6 June 1749 – 14 December [O.S. 2 December] 1800), known in Spanish as José Pascual Domingo de Ribas y Boyons, in Italian as Giuseppe de Ribas and in Russian as Iosif (Osip) Mikhailovich Deribas (Russian: Ио́сиф (О́сип) Миха́йлович Дериба́с), was a Spanish military officer under the Spanish held Kingdom of Naples, in Russian service.

== Life ==
Son of the Spanish consul in Naples, the capital of the Kingdom of Naples, and his Irish wife, he had been born in that city, then dynastically joined to the Kingdom of Spain, and served in the Neapolitan army in the late 1760s, but later joined the Russian Imperial Army as a "member of the Spanish nobility" in 1772, taking part in the Russo-Turkish War of 1768–1774 and afterwards remaining "on the margins of the Empress's court" as "one of the many young men hoping to gain [her] favour." When the Russo-Turkish War of 1787–1792 broke out, he was made the liaison between Grigory Potemkin and the unit commanded by John Paul Jones:

He worked assiduously to smoothe relations between Jones and the European officers, especially Nassau-Siegen, as well as with Potemkin. He dealt with cases of insubordination and drunkenness by talking firmly with the offenders rather than exacting immediate punishment. His performance was noted and rewarded. Potemkin personally transferred him from the navy and placed him in charge of an army detachment under the operational command of Count Ivan Gudovich, one of the most decorated and accomplished generals in the southern theater.

In late 1789, de Ribas's grenadiers captured Khadjibey (the village upon which the city of Odessa would be founded) without a battle: "It was, in fact, one of the great non-battles of the war. The entire affair lasted no more than half an hour. The Ottoman garrison, a few-dozen startled soldiers and their senior officer, surrendered on the spot."

His greatest deed was the storming of Izmail in 1790 under the supreme command of Alexander Suvorov. De Ribas participated in the development of a plan of assault, and led both Russian navy and land forces to capture the mighty fortress. If referring to the Russian Biographical Dictionary, he "proposed a plan of assault, which was approved by Suvorov." The defeat was seen as a catastrophe in the Ottoman Empire, while in Russia it was glorified in the country's early, unofficial national anthem, "Let the thunder of victory sound!". In 1791, de Ribas was promoted to rear admiral and commander of the Russian Black Sea Fleet. He was promoted to vice admiral in 1795 and to full admiral in 1796.

Shortly after the end of the war, he proposed a plan to Catherine of transforming the Ottoman garrison town of Khadjibey into a major Russian port with an ice-free harbor; she accepted the idea, and on 27 May 1794, she issued an edict ordering its development as a commercial and shipping center and naming de Ribas the chief administrator (glavnyi nachal'nik) of the project. He began constructing stone houses and administrative buildings and may have been the one to suggest naming the city after the ancient Greek town of Odessos (though Catherine is said to have insisted on a feminine ending, making it Odessa).

As a son-in-law of Ivan Betskoy and a secretary to Prince Potemkin, he became one of the earliest administrators of Novorossiya. He may have been involved in the conspiracy to overthrow Emperor Paul, but died several months before the coup took place. Contemporaries thought he had been poisoned by one of the conspirators, Count von der Pahlen, to keep him from revealing the plot under the effects of the fever. De Ribas died in Saint Petersburg. His tomb is in the Smolensky Lutheran Cemetery.

== Legacy ==
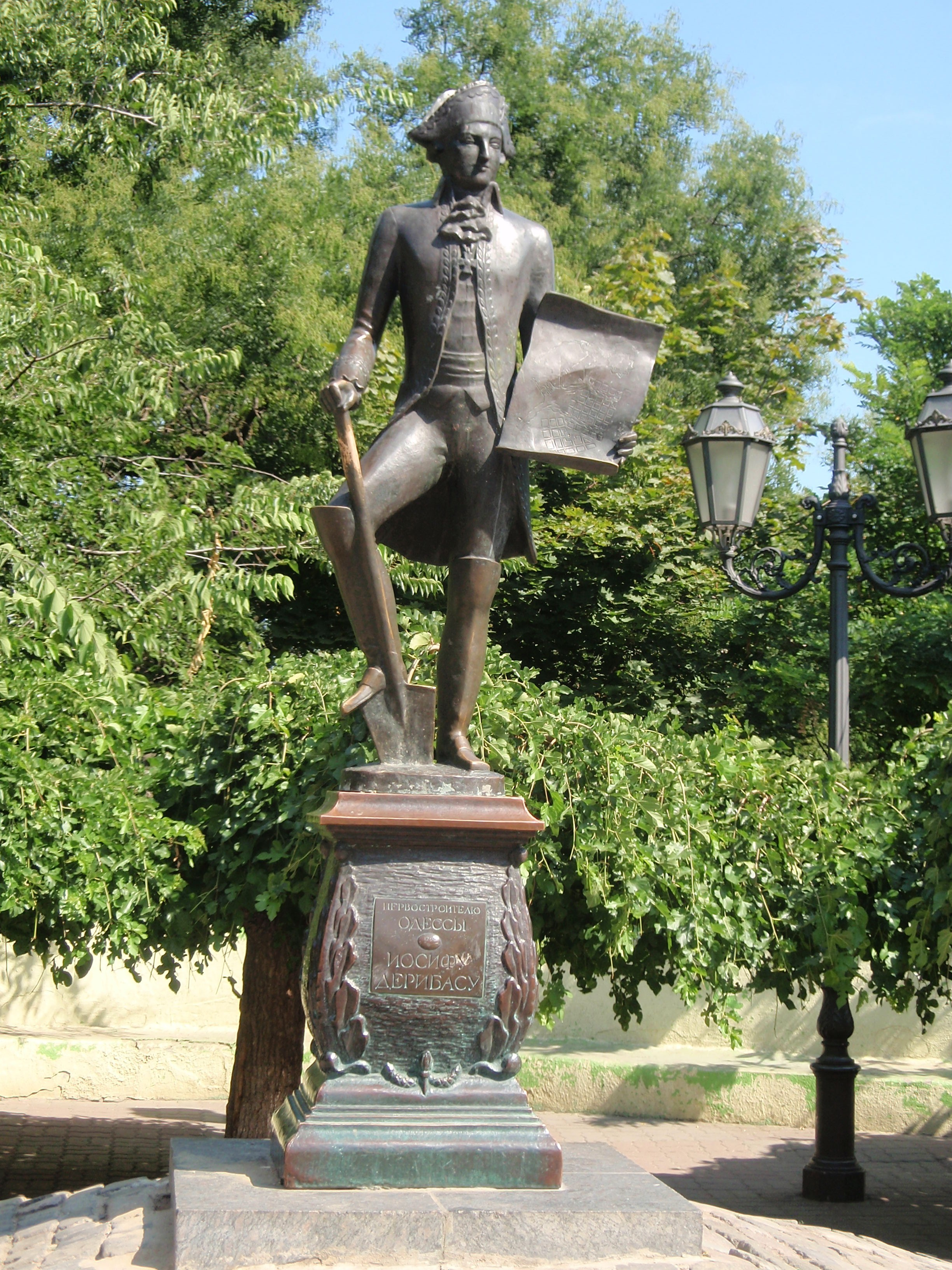
Monument to Ribas in Odesa, Ukraine

In recognition of de Ribas' famous victory at nearby Khadjibey, the future city's most famous street, Derybasivska, was named after him. José de Ribas was one of the principal figures on the monument of Catherine the Great in Odessa and there is a small personal monument to him at the beginning of Derybasivska Street.

== See also ==
- Odesa Museum of Regional History

== Bibliography ==
- "Дерибас, Осип Михайлович" . Brockhaus and Efron Encyclopedic Dictionary (in Russian). 1906.
- Addis, Bill; Kurrer, Karl-Eugen; Lorenz, Werner (2020). Physical Models: Their Historical and Current Use in Civil and Building Engineering Design. Wiley. ISBN 978-34-33609-62-0 – via Google Books.
- Merry del Val, Diego (2008). "José de Ribas: Un Genio Militar al Servicio de la Zarina". Clío: Revista de historia. 78: 74–79.
- White, Duncan (Summer 2013). "Reviewed Work: Isaac Babel and the Self-Invention of Odessan Modernism. Studies in Russian Literature and Theory by Rebecca Jane Stanton". The Slavic and East European Journal. 57 (2): 300–302. JSTOR 24642452.

Government offices
Preceded by post created	Mayor of Odessa; 1794 – 1797	Succeeded by Pavel Pustoshkin
