= Taganay =

Mountain range in Chelyabinsk Oblast, Russia

Taganay National Park
- IUCN category II (national park)
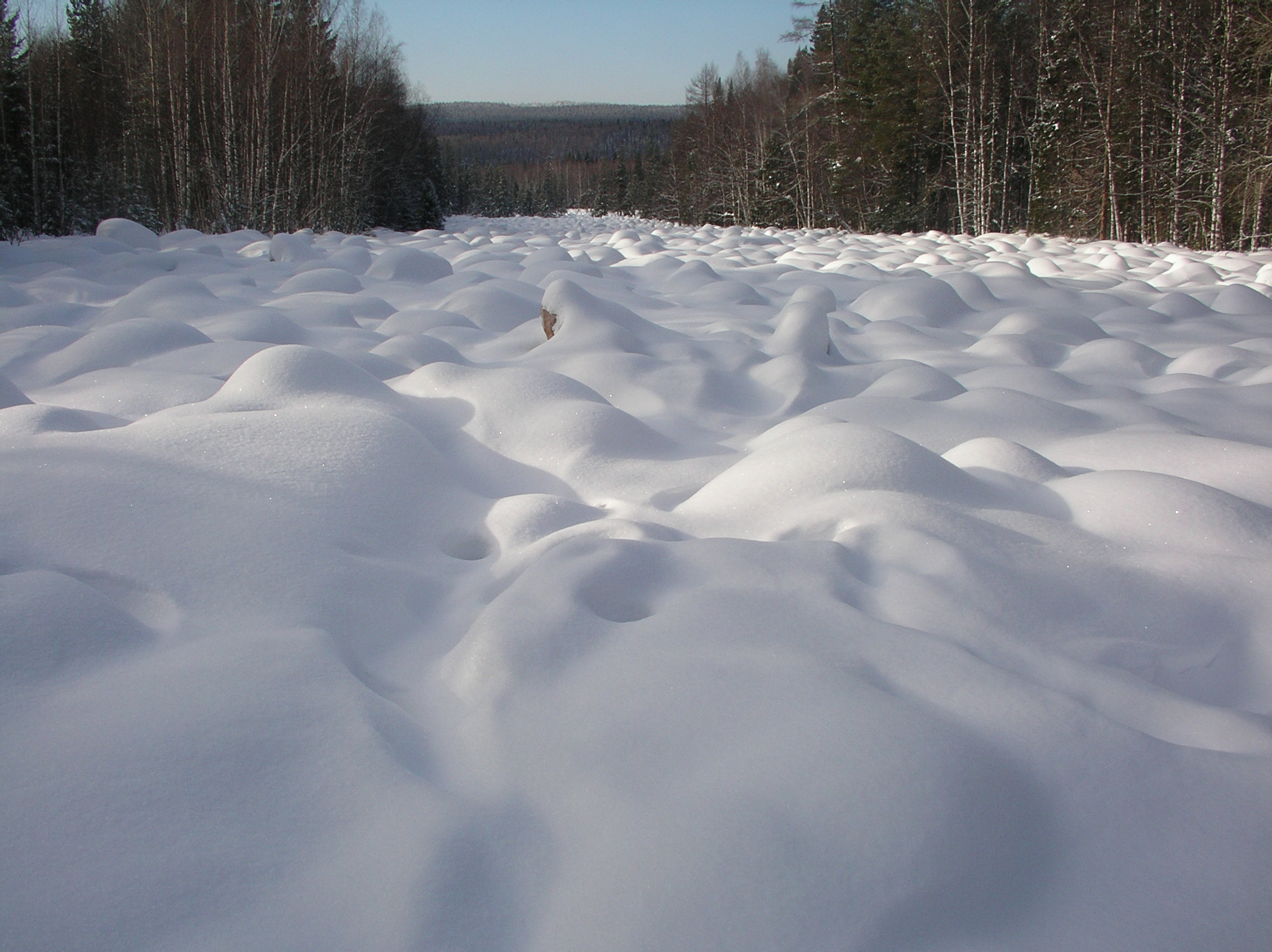
- "The river of rocks" in Taganay.

- Location within Russia
- Location: Chelyabinsk Region, Zlatoust, Russia
- Nearest city: Zlatoust
- Coordinates: 55°15′35″N 59°47′33″E
- Area: 568 km^{2} (219 sq mi)
- Established: March 5, 1991
- Website: http://taganay.org/

Taganay (Russian: Таганай, Bashkir: Тағанай) is a group of mountain ridges in the Southern Urals, on the territory of Chelyabinsk Oblast, with the highest point rising 1178 m. above sea level. Taganay National Park was established in 1991, with its south-western border reaching down to the outskirts of Zlatoust. Total area of the park is about 568 square kilometres (219 sq mi), with the distance of 52 km (32 mi) from north to south and width of about 10–15 km (6.2–9.3 mi).

The vast majority of the park is covered with forests of Siberian spruce, pine, larch, aspen, willow, lime and alder. Over 750 species of plants have been recorded, some of which are listed in the Red Book. This is also home to many animal species, wolves, lynxes, brown bears, martens, moose and otters. The park is also home to about 180 species of birds, 55 species of mammals and 10 species of fish. Some of them are also recorded in the Red Book.

== Climate and weather ==
Climate data for Zlatoust, Russia
| Month | Jan | Feb | Mar | Apr | May | Jun | Jul | Aug | Sep | Oct | Nov | Dec | Year |
|---|---|---|---|---|---|---|---|---|---|---|---|---|---|
| Daily mean °F | 3 | 6 | 15 | 32 | 46 | 55 | 60 | 57 | 44 | 32 | 21 | 6 | 32 |
| Average precipitation inches | 1.4 | 1.1 | 1.1 | 1.7 | 2.3 | 3.2 | 4.7 | 3.1 | 2.8 | 2.5 | 1.9 | 1.5 | 27.2 |
| Daily mean °C | −16 | −14 | −9 | 0 | 8 | 13 | 16 | 14 | 7 | 0 | −6 | −14 | 0 |
| Average precipitation mm | 36 | 28 | 28 | 43 | 58 | 81 | 120 | 79 | 71 | 64 | 48 | 38 | 690 |

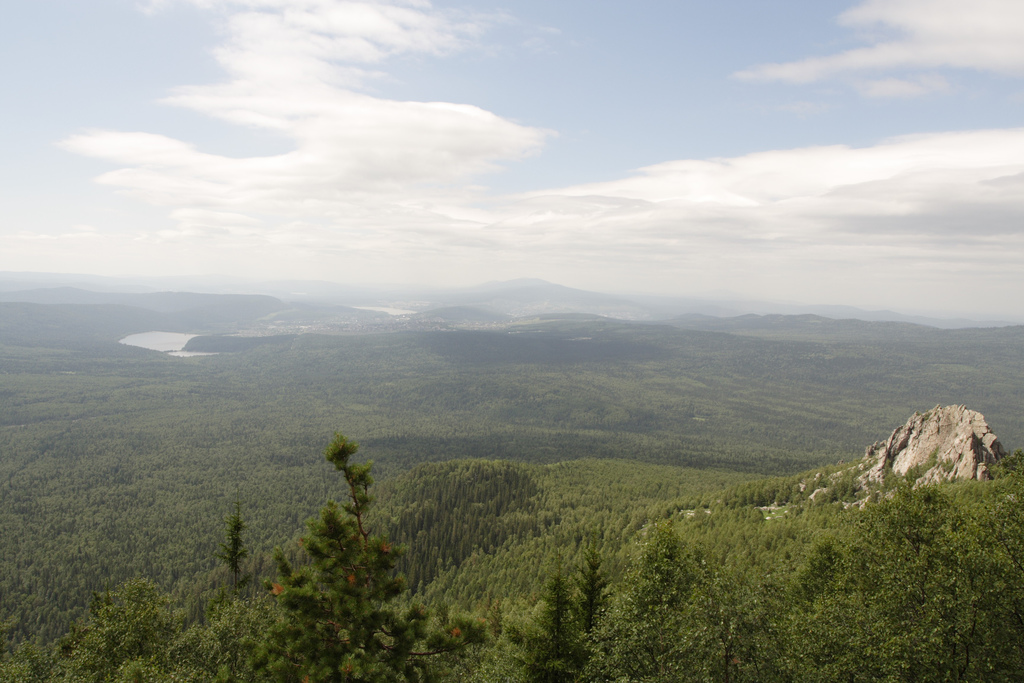
Looking south in the direction of Zlatoust.
