= Dekabristov Island =

Island in Russia

Coordinates: 59°57′N 30°14′E

Native name: Остров Декабристов
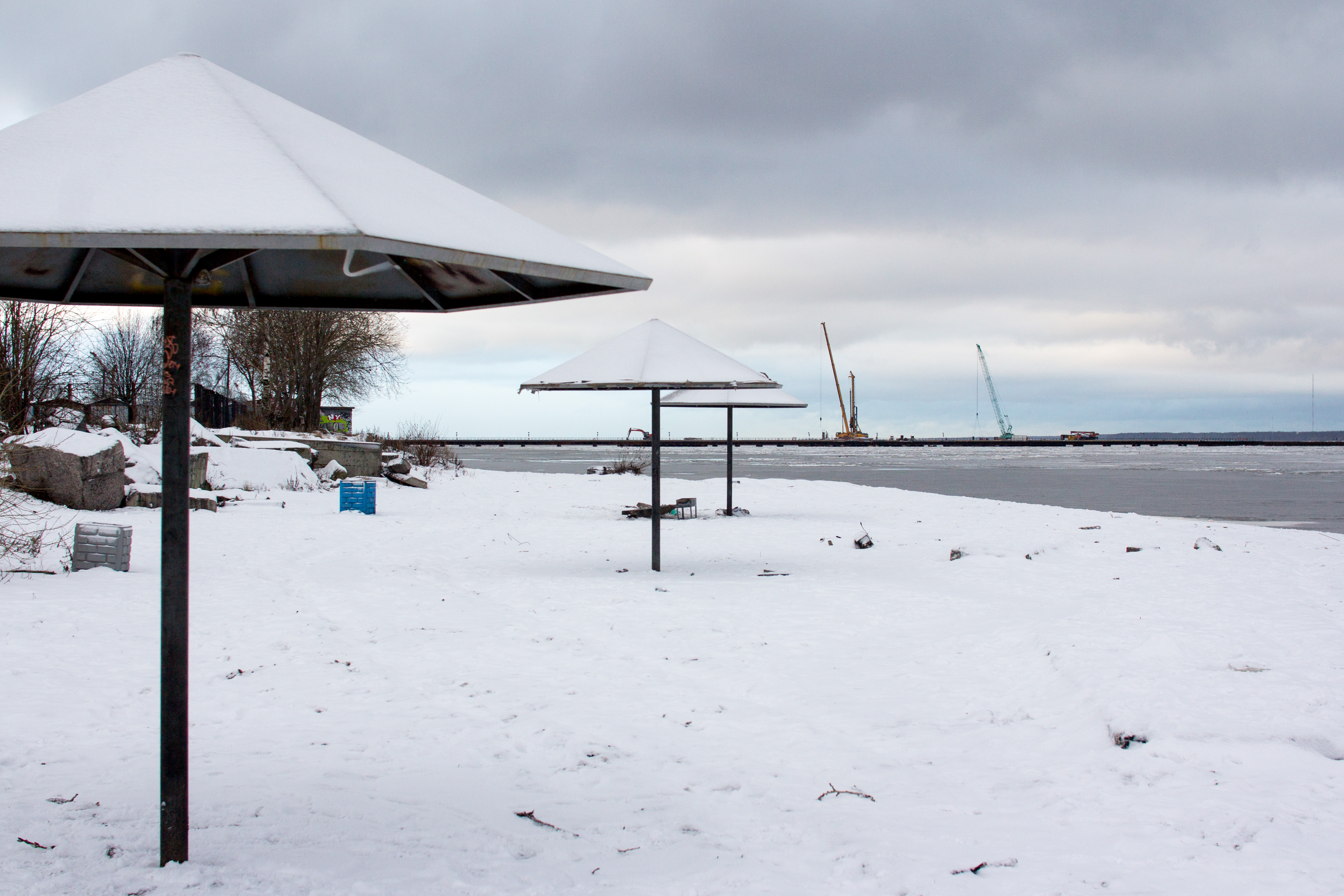

Dekabristov Island (Russian: остров Декабристов, lit. 'Decembrists Island'), known prior to 1926 as Goloday Island (остров Голодай – possibly a corruption of a British merchant name Halliday; the original name in Finnish: Alaissaari, lit. 'Lower Island') is an island in Vasileostrovsky District of Saint Petersburg, Russia, to the north of Vasilyevsky Island, separated from it by Smolenka River.

The island, originally low-lying and frequently flooded, all the same was traditionally used as the Smolensky Lutheran Cemetery. In the early Soviet period, the name was changed to Decembrists' Island to commemorate five executed leaders of Decembrist revolt, who were buried in an unmarked grave on Goloday.

In 1911, a British investment company launched a development project on a 1 square-kilometer lot in western Goloday Island, hiring Ivan Fomin and Fyodor Lidval to design a Neoclassical middle-classical neighborhood. A small part of this project was completed before World War I and the Russian Revolution. Eastern and northern sides of the island were heavily industrialized; the western half of the island was built up with a Brezhnev-era high-rise.

Dekabristov Island is connected to Vasilievsky Island to the south with five automobile bridges, and to the tiny Serny Island north from it. It is connected to the center of the city through Primorskaya station of Saint Petersburg Metro.
