= Pavel Kutaisov =

Russian politician

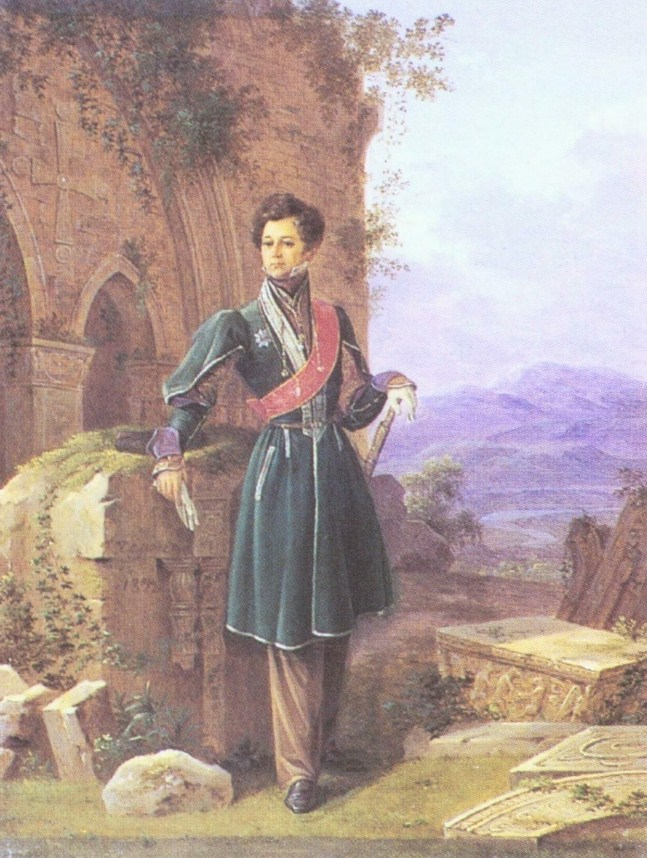
Pavel Kutaisov; posthumous portrait by Grigory Chernetsov

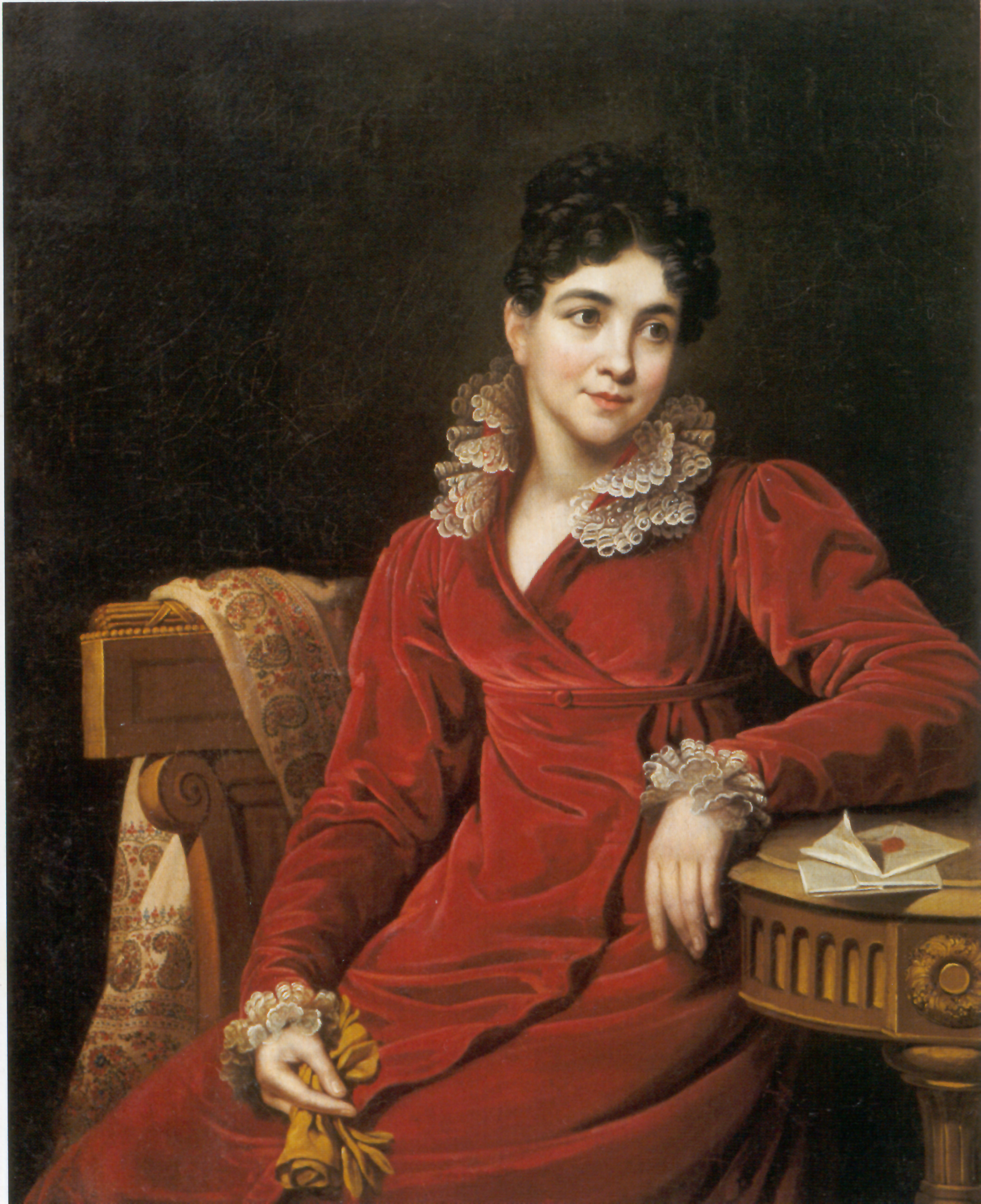
His wife, Praskovya, by Johann Rombauer

Count Pavel Ivanovich Kutaisov (Russian:Павел Иванович Кутайсов; 25 November 1780, Saint Petersburg - 9 March 1840, Tambov) — was a Georgian born Russian Imperial Chamberlain and Steward. He also served as Chairman of the Imperial Society for the Encouragement of the Arts and was a member of the State Council.

== Biography ==
His father, Ivan Pavlovich Kutaisov, was the favorite valet of Tsar Paul I and was probably of Georgian origin. At the age of seven, he was enlisted in the Life Guard Horse Regiment. By 1796, when he was sixteen, he had already advanced to an important rank, but was not as committed to a military career as other members of his family. At the request of his father, Admiral Alexander Shishkov took him under his wing for a short tour of Europe, but this apparently did not work out well. Many of his contemporaries; notably Alexander Bulgakov, spoke poorly of him.

His career was advanced considerably when the Tsar took Anna Lopukhina as a mistress and his father was able to arrange a marriage to Anna's sister, Praskovya Lopukhina (1784-1870). Although they had five children, he was widely believed to be homosexual. In 1800, he was named an Imperial Chamberlain. Upon the accession of Alexander I, he was transferred to the Collegium of Foreign Affairs, where he served until 1809, when he was named a Prosecutor for the Governing Senate. During the French Invasion of Russia, he led the evacuation of the Senate to Kazan and was awarded a gold snuff box for his efforts.

In 1816, he received a promotion to Privy Councillor and, in 1817, became a member of the Senate. He also served on various commissions, including oversight of the construction of Saint Isaac's Cathedral and directing operations for the Imperial theaters. In 1826, he was appointed to the Supreme Criminal Court charged with prosecuting the Decembrists. In 1832, he became an Imperial Steward. After receiving two more promotions, he was stripped of his ranks, following the disastrous Fire in the Winter Palace.

In addition to his governmental duties, he served as Chairman of the Imperial Society for the Encouragement of the Arts and was known as a patron of young artists. In 1835, he accompanied Mikhail Scotti on a study trip to Italy, and provided a workshop for the brothers Grigory and Nikanor Chernetsov.

== Issue ==
His daughter, Countess Anna Pavlovna Kutaisova (1800-1868), married Prince Okropir of Georgia. Although never officially separated, from the mid-1830s Praskovya spent most of her time abroad. In 1840, he retired to his estate in Tambov, to organize his affairs, and died there.
