= Ivan Valberkh =

Russian choreographer, ballet master and ballet dancer (1766–1819)

- Иван Иванович Вальберх
- Portrait by unknown master, 1810s, watercolor; Museum of Theatre and Music, St. Petersburg
- Born: July 14, 1766; Moscow
- Died: July 26, 1819 (aged 53); St. Petersburg
- Resting place: Smolensky Cemetery, St. Petersburg
- Education: Imperial Ballet School, St. Petersburg
- Occupations: Dancer, Teacher, Director
- Years active: 1786-1819
- Employer: Imperial Theatres
- Known for: Russia's first native ballet master
- Spouse: Sophia Petrovna Walberg (d. 1811)
- Children: 14

Ivan Ivanovich Valberkh (1766–1819) was a Russian ballet master, choreographer and teacher. He was the first native born choreographer and ballet master of Russian nationality. At the beginning of the nineteenth century, Russian ballet scene was dominated by him and played a huge role in developing style of Russian ballet.

He was fluent in French, Italian and German and knew history, philosophy and mythology. He performed 36 ballets and translated around 30 French plays. He championed the rights of Russian dancers and resented foreign interference.

== History ==
He was born as Ivan Lesogorov on 14 July 1766 in Moscow, Russian Empire. He is also referred as Waldberg or Lessogorov-Wahlberg or Walberch. His father was a theater tailor and his great-grandfather was a captured Swedish officer who earlier served in the army of Sweden during the reign of King Charles XII and decided to stay in Russia.

He studied at the St Petersburg Ballet School under Gasparo Angiolini and Giuseppe Canziani and graduated in 1786. He published two letters in which he accused the Jean-Georges Noverre of violating the rule of the three unities. In the 1786, he become soloist in court ballet troupe, a position which was almost never awarded to the Russians, at the Bolshoi Theatre in St Petersburg. In 1793, he introduced Prince Alexander Aleksandrovigh Shakhovskoy to theaters.

In 1794, he was appointed to lead the St Petersburg School and promoted to post of ballet inspector to oversee the company. He was the first Russian to head St Petersburg Ballet School. When the ballet school was closed for some time and the students were dismissed, he took some of the most capable students to his home, where they continued their studies. There he taught Eugenia Kolosova and Adam Glushkovsky.

In 1795, he made his debut with A Happy Repentance. His ballet 'The New Werther' (1799), based on Goethe, established his reputation as the first Russian to make a contemporary themed ballet. He, probably for the first time in history of ballet, took a recent tragic event as a plot. Between 1794 and 1801, he was a teacher at the St. Petersburg Theatrical School. In 1802, he was sent on a business trip to Paris at public expense to learn advanced ballet. There he criticised French ballet and recognized authorities such as Auguste Vestris and returned back to Russia disappointed. He also worked and taught in Moscow in 1807, 1808, and 1811.

In 1809, his Romeo and Juliet was first ballet to be performed based on a Shakespearean tragedy in Russia. He succeeded Charles Didelot as ballet master of Bolshoi Theatre in St Petersburg after he left in 1811. During the Napoleonic wars, he choreographed many ballets which had patriotic themes. His first patriotic ballet “Love for the Fatherland” was performed 4 days after Battle of Borodino. His patriotic ballets were so inspiring that many people in the audience enlisted in the army.

He married Sofija Petrovna Walberg and had 14 children, including Maria Ivanovna Walberg, with her. He died on 26 July 1819 in St Petersburg.

== Philosophy and style ==
During his time under Gaspero Angiolini, he started preferring pantomime and mastered it. Charles Le Picq was a role model for him. His productions were filled with action which stated the instructive importance of ballet. He embraced the concepts of Noverre's ballet d'action in his ballets to create dramatic elements. In his productions, the pantomime often suppressed the dance. He became attracted to the idea of sentimentalism and its democracy. Valberkh created a new style that was based the traditions of sentimentalism in Russian art. He called his choreographic works “moral ballets”. He also wanted to stop being guided by the tastes of the royal court. He sought to collaborate mainly with Russian composers like Nikolai Sergeevich Titov and Nikolai Alexeyevich Titov.

He incorporated Russian folk dance elements into ballets. In his ballet 'Militia', he invoked folk style, kazachok and khorovod, together with military marches to enhance a drama contrasting merry celebration with impassioned scenes of the militia's departure.

He often took inspiration and based his ballets on literature. His productions mostly repeated European repertoire. His creative work was filled with Russian themed ballets and established a distinctive type of national performance, divertissements which depicted ordinary people's life. He also made ballet on foreign historical personage.

He felt that the center of attention was not a hero with his passions, but a simple man with his feelings. He looked for his heroes among ordinary people and often showed an ordinary person who remained faithful to his convictions despite being in difficult circumstances. His productions had two titles - one told about the main character and the plot while the other directly deduced the moral that triumphed the last act. Many of his ballets had a didactic character.

== List of ballets ==
- Happy Repentance (1795)
- The New Werther (1799)
- The Village Heroine (1800)
- Sacrifice of Gratitude (1802)
- Blanca, or, A Marriage of Revenge (1803)
- The Count Castelli, or, A Murderous Brother (1804)
- The Consequence of the Village Heroine (1806)
- Clara, or, The Resort to Virtue (1806)
- The Triumph of Evgenia's Love, or, The Secret Marriage (1807)
- Raoul the Blue-Beard, or, The Dangers of Curiosity (1807)
- Orpheus and Eurydice (1808)
- Romeo and Juliet (1809)
- The New Heroine, or, The Cossack Woman (1811)
- The People's Volunteer Corps, or, Love for the Motherland (1812)
- The Home Guard, or, The Love for the Fatherland (1812)
- The Militia, or, Love for the Homeland’ (1812)
- Russians in Germany, or, What Comes of Love for the Motherland (1813)
- Cossack in London (1813)
- Festival in the Allied Armies' Camp at Montmartre (1813)
- The American Heroine, or, Perfidy Punished (1814)
- Russian Victory, or, The Russians in Paris (1814)
- Cendrillon (1815)
- The Amazon (1815)
- Henry IV, or, The Reward of Virtue (1816)
