= Nikolai Ramazanov =

Russian sculptor (1817–1867)

- Николай Рамазанов
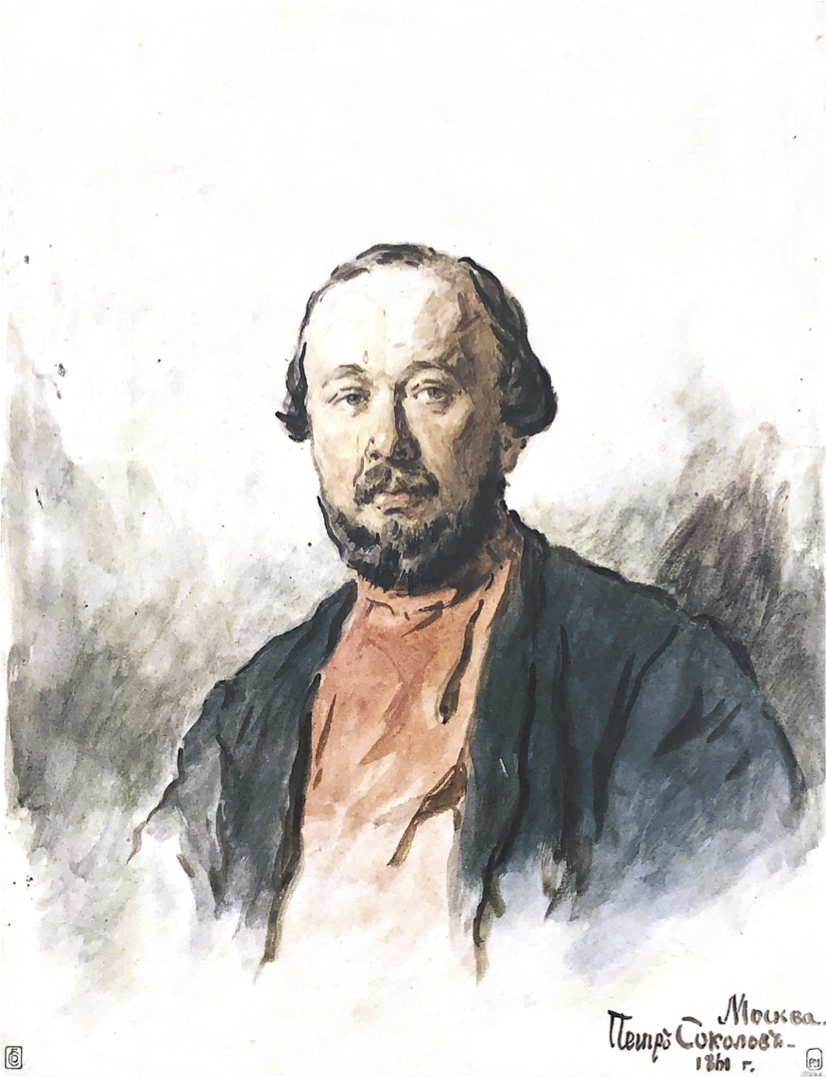
- Watercolor portrait by Pyotr Petrovich Sokolov, 1861; Russian Museum, St. Petersburg
- Born: February 5, 1817; Saint Petersburg
- Died: November 30, 1867 (aged 50); Moscow
- Resting place: Novo-Alexeevsky Monastery, Moscow
- Education: Boris Orlovsky; Samuil Galberg
- Alma mater: Imperial Academy of Arts (1839)
- Known for: Sculpture
- Style: Academism
- Awards: Big Gold Medal of the Imperial Academy of Arts (1839)
- Elected: Member Academy of Arts (1849); Professor by rank (1858)

Nikolai Alexandrovich Ramazanov (Russian: Никола́й Алекса́ндрович Рамаза́нов; 24 January 1817 – 18 November 1867) was a Russian sculptor, painter, writer and art historian.

== Biography ==
He came from a theatrical family. His father, Alexander Ramazanov, was an actor with the Imperial Theatres. A grandfather and uncle were choreographers. His aunt, Maria Valberkhova, was also a dramatic actress, who later turned to comedy.

He began to learn drawing in 1827, at the age of ten, from Fedor Solntsev at the Imperial Academy of Fine Arts. He received his first certificate in 1829 and became a regularly enrolled student in 1833. By this time, both of his parents were dead.

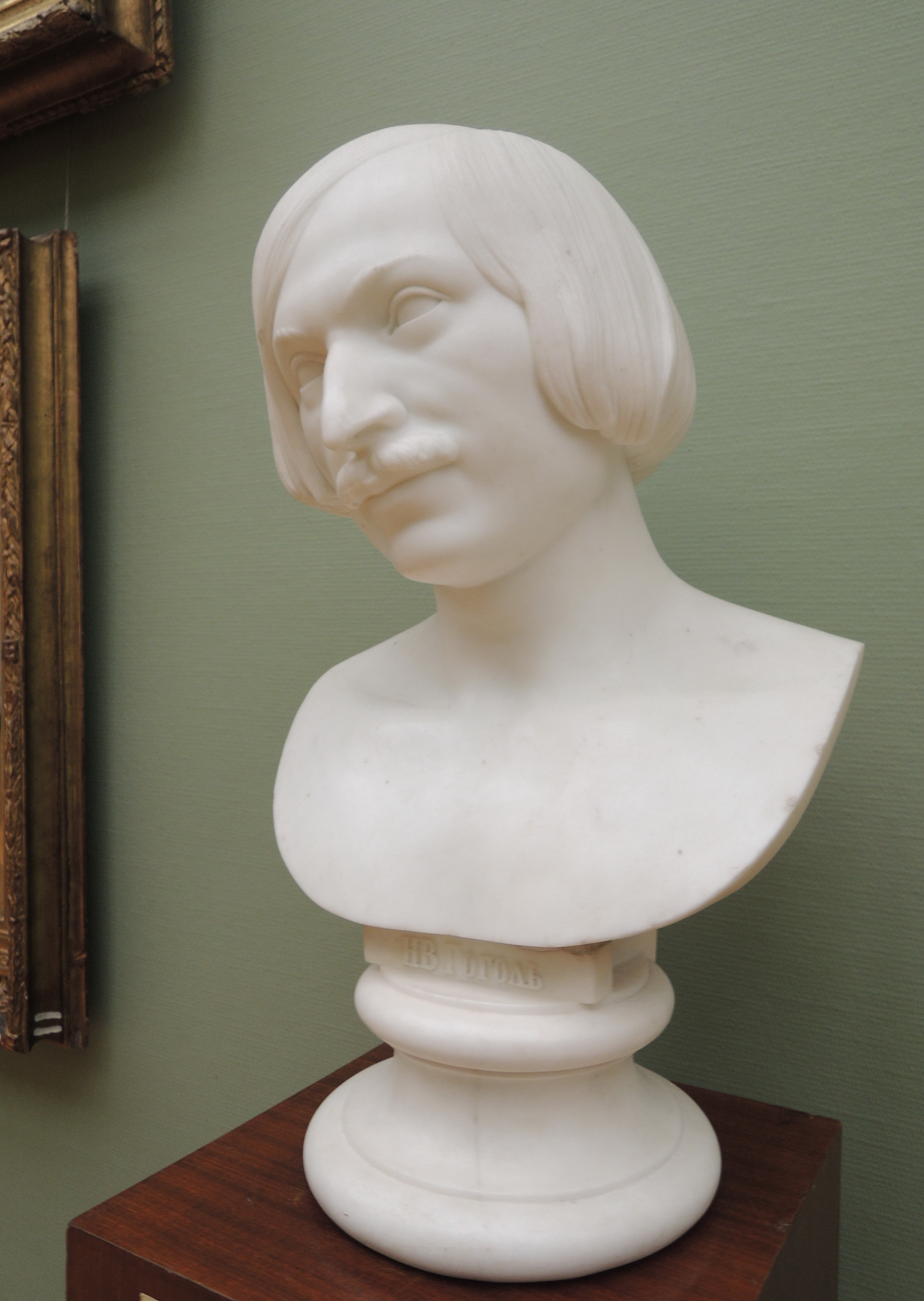
Bust of Nikolai Gogol

In 1836, he received a small silver medal for "sculpting from nature" and began to study with Boris Orlovsky. He completed his studies in 1839 as an "Artist 14th Class" and was awarded the right to travel abroad as a pensioner of the Academy. Before departing, he worked on a project at the Winter Palace and participated in creating monuments for Nikolai Karamzin (in Simbirsk), and Gavril Derzhavin (in Kazan). He left for Italy in 1843.

In 1846, he was recalled to Russia as the result of a clash with the Papal Police. By the end of the year, he was offered a job as a teacher at the Moscow School of Painting, Sculpture and Architecture. He took up that position the following year, but soon had to attend to the sudden collapse of a statue he had made for the new Annunciation Church of the Horse Guards Regiment.

He returned to the school at the first opportunity and remained there for the rest of his life. In 1849, he was named an Academician and, in 1858, was elevated to Professor. Matvei Chizhov is, perhaps, his best-known student. For many years, he was employed by the literary journal, Moskvityanin and the Moskovskiye Vedomosti; writing biographies and obituaries of artists as well as notes on art exhibitions.

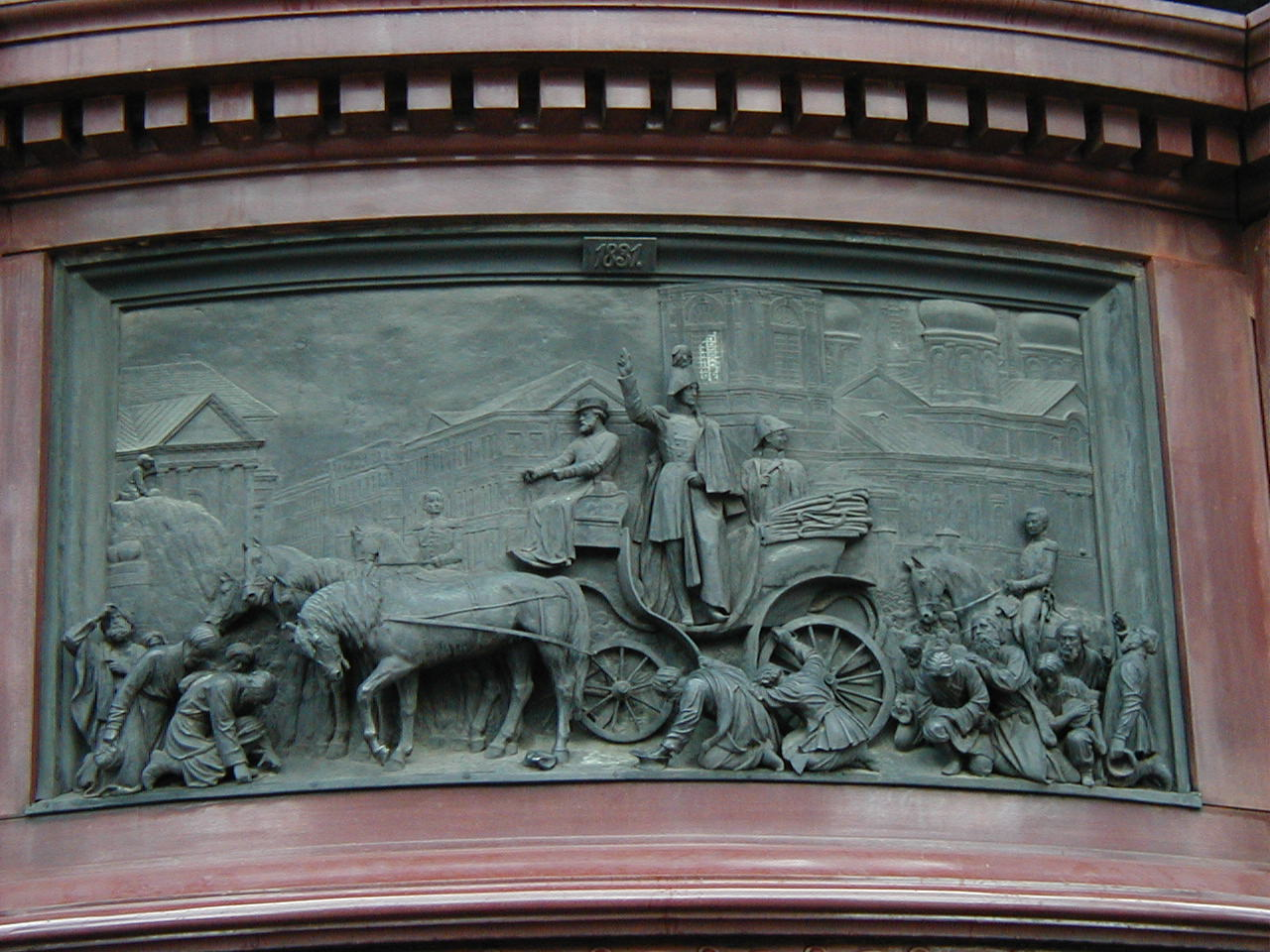
Bas-Relief on the Monument to Nicholas I; depicting him quelling the Cholera Riots

In 1866, he was forced to resign, for unknown reasons. He died the following year; leaving behind a widow, a son, and two daughters.

Among his most familiar works are the bas-reliefs on the pedestal of the Monument to Nicholas I, in Saint Petersburg, some external decorations at the Cathedral of Christ the Saviour, and several busts; including ones of Fyodor Petrovich Tolstoy, Alexander Pushkin and Nikolai Gogol, which was created from his death mask.

== Publications ==
- Ramazanov, Nikolai A. (2014). Belyaev, Nikolai S. (ed.). Материалы для истории художеств в России (PDF) (in Russian). St. Petersburg: Library of the Russian Academy of Sciences. ISBN 978-5-336-00162-4. OCLC 952577337.
