= Ignaz Aurelius Fessler =

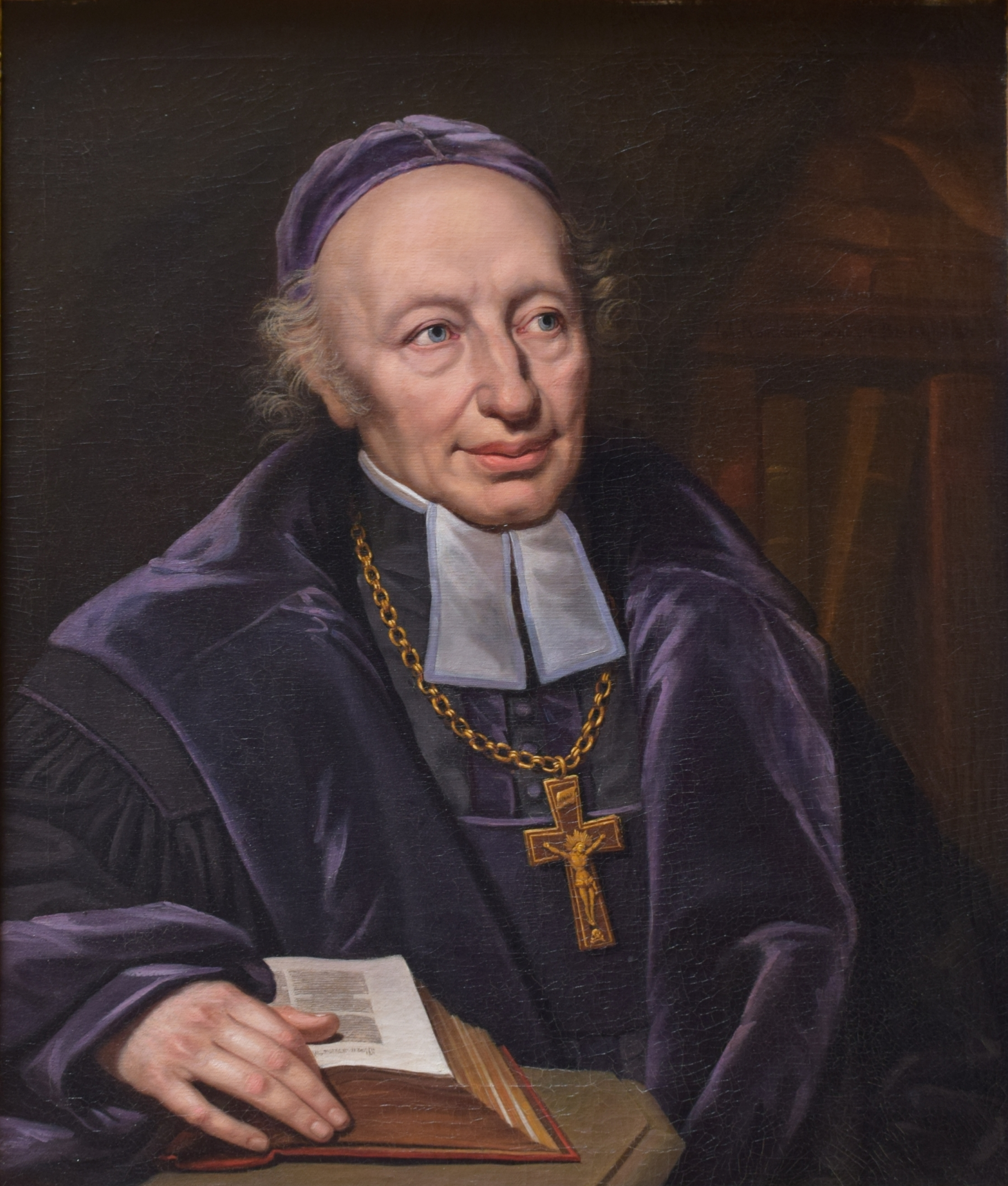
- His portrait by Johann Rombauer (1821)

Ignaz Aurelius Fessler, a.k.a. Feßler (Hungarian: Fessler Ignác Aurél; 18 May 1756 – 15 December 1839) was a Hungarian ecclesiastic, politician, historian, and freemason.

== Biography ==
Fessler was born in the village of Zurndorf in the Hungarian Moson County. In 1773, he joined the order of Capuchin friars, and in 1779 was ordained priest. He had meanwhile continued his classical and philological studies, and his liberal views brought him into frequent conflict with his superiors.

In 1784, while at the monastery of Mödling, near Vienna, he wrote to the emperor Joseph II, making suggestions for the better education of the clergy and drawing his attention to the irregularities of the monasteries. The searching investigation which followed raised up against him many implacable enemies. In 1784 he was appointed professor of Oriental languages and hermeneutics in the university of Lemberg, when he took the degree of doctor of divinity; and shortly afterwards he was released from his monastic vows on the intervention of the emperor.

In 1788 he brought out his tragedy of Sidney, an exposé of the tyranny of James II and of the fanaticism of the Roman Catholics in England. This was attacked so violently as profane and revolutionary that he was compelled to resign his office and seek refuge in Silesia. In Breslau he met with a cordial reception from G. W. Komn, the publisher, and was, moreover, subsequently employed by the prince of Carolath-Schbnaich as tutor to his sons. In 1791 Fessler was converted to Lutheranism and next year contracted an unhappy marriage, which was dissolved in 1802, when he married again.

In 1796 he went to Berlin, where he founded a humanitarian society. In April 1800, through his introduction, the philosopher Johann Gottlieb Fichte was initiated into freemasonry in a Berlin lodge. Fessler was commissioned by the freemasons to assist Fichte in reforming the statutes and ritual of their lodge. At first Fichte was the warm admirer of Fessler, and was disposed to aid Fessler in his proposed reform. But later he became Fessler's bitter opponent. Their controversy attracted much attention among freemasons. Soon after this, Fessler obtained a government appointment in connection with the newly acquired Polish provinces, but in consequence of the battle of Jena (1806) he lost this office, and remained in very needy circumstances until 1809, when he was summoned to St. Petersburg by Alexander I, to fill the post of court councillor, the professorship of oriental languages and philosophy at the Alexander-Nevski Academy, and finally minister to the Court of St. James (Britain). This office, however, he was soon obliged to resign, owing to his alleged atheistic tendencies, but he was subsequently nominated a member of the legislative commission by the Emperor.

In 1815 he went with his family to Sarepta, where he joined the Moravian community and again became strongly orthodox. This cost him the loss of his salary, but it was restored to him upon his return in 1817. In November 1820, he was appointed consistorial president of the evangelical communities at Saratov and subsequently became chief superintendent of the Lutheran communities in St. Petersburg. In recognition of his important services to Hungary as a historian, he was in 1831 elected a corresponding member of the Hungarian Academy of Sciences. He died at St. Petersburg.

== Writings ==
Fessler was a voluminous writer, and during his life exercised great influence; but, with the possible exception of the history of Hungary, none of his books has any value now. He did not pretend to any critical treatment of his materials, and most of his historical works are practically historical novels. He did too much, however, to make the study of history popular. His works are all written in German.

His most important works are:

- Die Geschichten der Ungarn und ihrer Landsassen (10 vols., Leipzig, 1815-1825)
- Marcus Aurelius (3 vols., Breslau, 1790–1792; 3rd edition, 4 vols., 1799)
- Aristides und Themistokles (2 vols., Berlin, 1792; 3rd edition, 1818)
- Attila, König der Hunnen (Breslau, 1794)
- Matthias Corvinus (2 vols., Breslau, 1793-1794)
- Die drei grossen Könige der Hungarn aus dem Árpád-Arpadischen Stamme (Breslau, 1808)
- Rückblick auf meine Siebzigjährige Pilgerschaft (2nd ed., Leipzig 1851)
