= Nikanor Chernetsov =

Russian painter (1805–1879)

- Никанор Григорьевич Чернецов
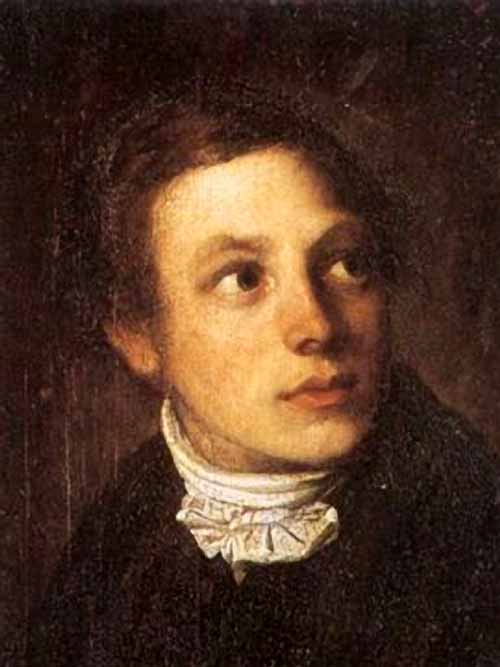
- Nikanor Chernetsov; portrait by his brother Grigory (1823—1825)
- Born: June 21, 1805; Lukh, Yuryevetsky Uyezd, Kostroma Governorate, Russian Empire
- Died: January 11, 1879 (aged 74); Saint Petersburg
- Education: Member Academy of Arts (1832)
- Alma mater: Imperial Academy of Arts
- Known for: Painting
- Awards: Big Gold Medal of the Imperial Academy of Arts (1830)

Nikanor Grigoryevich Chernetsov (Russian: Никанор Григорьевич Чернецов: 21 June 1805, Lukh – 11 January 1879, Saint Petersburg) was a Russian landscape painter. His elder brother Grigory Chernetsov was also a painter.

== Biography ==
His father and older brother, Yevgraf, were icon painters. With the financial assistance of Pavel Svinyin, he moved to Saint Petersburg in 1823. After receiving a grant from the Imperial Society for the Encouragement of the Arts, he was able to enroll at the Imperial Academy of Arts and studied with Maxim Vorobiev until 1827.

After graduating with a small gold medal, he travelled along the Black Sea coast with Count Pavel Kutaisov, then worked as a draftsman for Auguste de Montferrand on Saint Isaac's Cathedral. From 1833 to 1836, he was in the service of Mikhail Vorontsov, Governor-General of Novorossiya, travelling throughout Crimea, sketching nature, ruins, and ethnic customs. Many of these sketches later became paintings. Through Vorontsov, he became a good friend of Alexander Pushkin and decorated his office with a landscape of Darial Gorge.

After 1838, he accompanied his brother, Grigory, and Anton Ivanov-Goluboy along the Volga in a specially equipped boat/studio, making numerous sketches that were later turned into a panorama that was 700 meters (2300 feet) in length and was wound on a roller. Pieces of it are still kept at the National Library of Russia.

During the 1840s, the brothers paid several visits to Italy and the Eastern Mediterranean, but their book of lithographs, Palestine: Views Drawn from Life by the Academicians N. and G. Chernetsov in 1842–43 was not very successful. Grigory continued to use this material, but Nikanor went back to views of Russia.

When Grigory died, Nikanor was too poor to bury him. The academy provided 200 Rubles and, after much negotiating, agreed to buy their remaining portfolios and paintings in installments over several years, but this process was never completed.

== Selected paintings ==
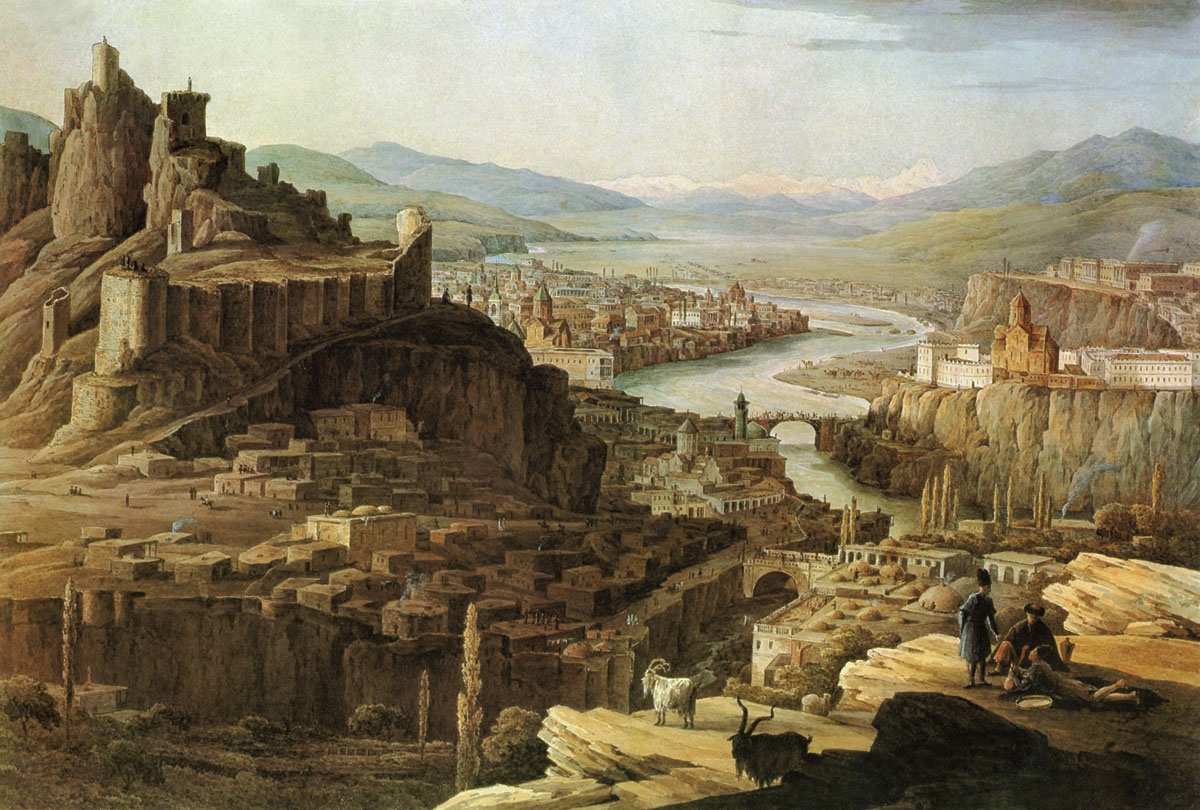
View of Tbilisi

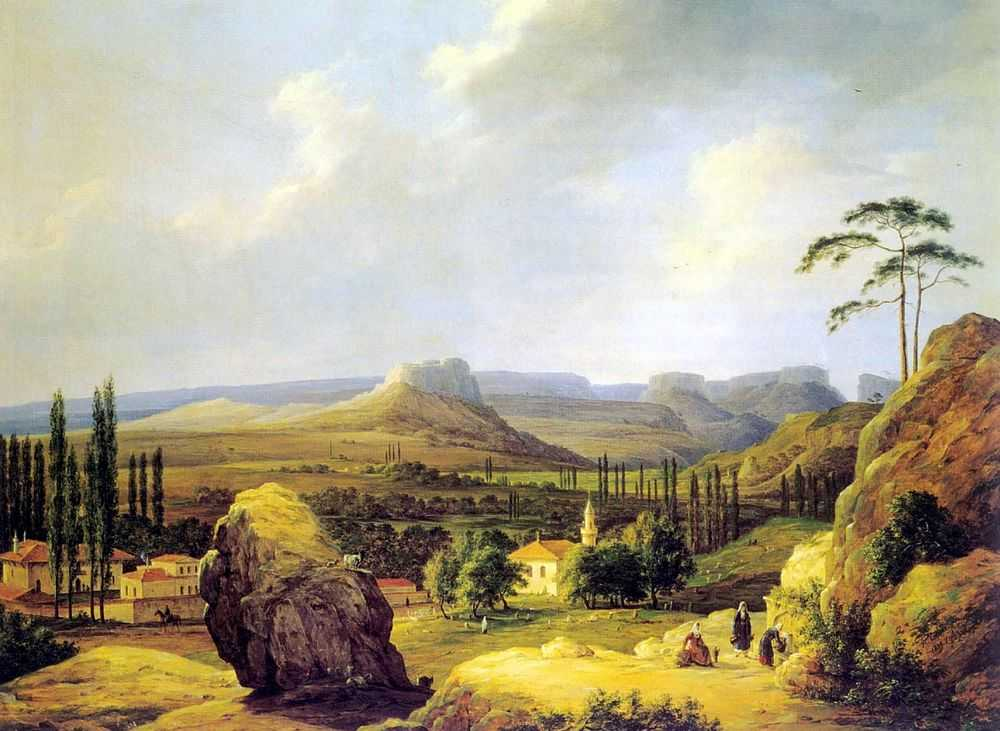
Crimean Lowland

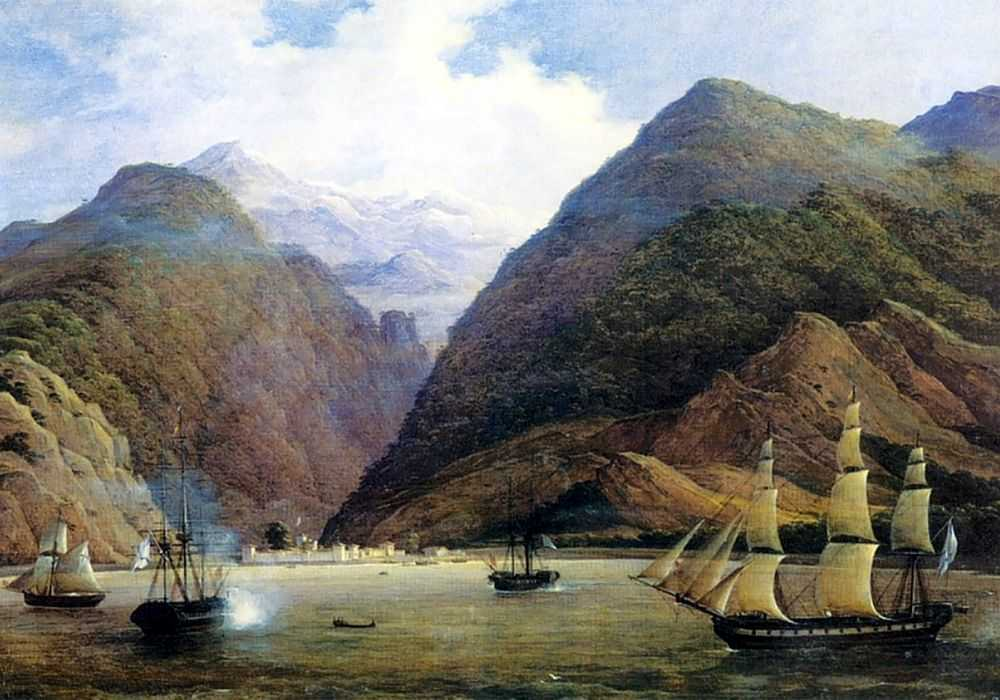
Gagra Fortress
