= Matvey Chizhov =

Russian sculptor (1838–1916)

- Матвей Чижов
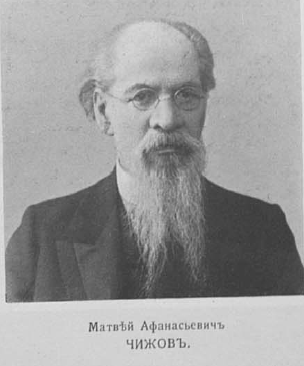
- Portrait from the Anniversary Reference of the Imperial Academy of Arts (1914)
- Born: November 10, 1838; Moscow Governorate, Russia
- Died: May 28, 1916 (aged 77); Petrograd, Russia
- Resting place: Smolensky Cemetery, St. Petersburg, Russia
- Education: Member Academy of Arts (1873); Full Member Academy of Arts (1893)
- Known for: Sculpture
- Awards: Big Gold Medal of the Imperial Academy of Arts (1867)

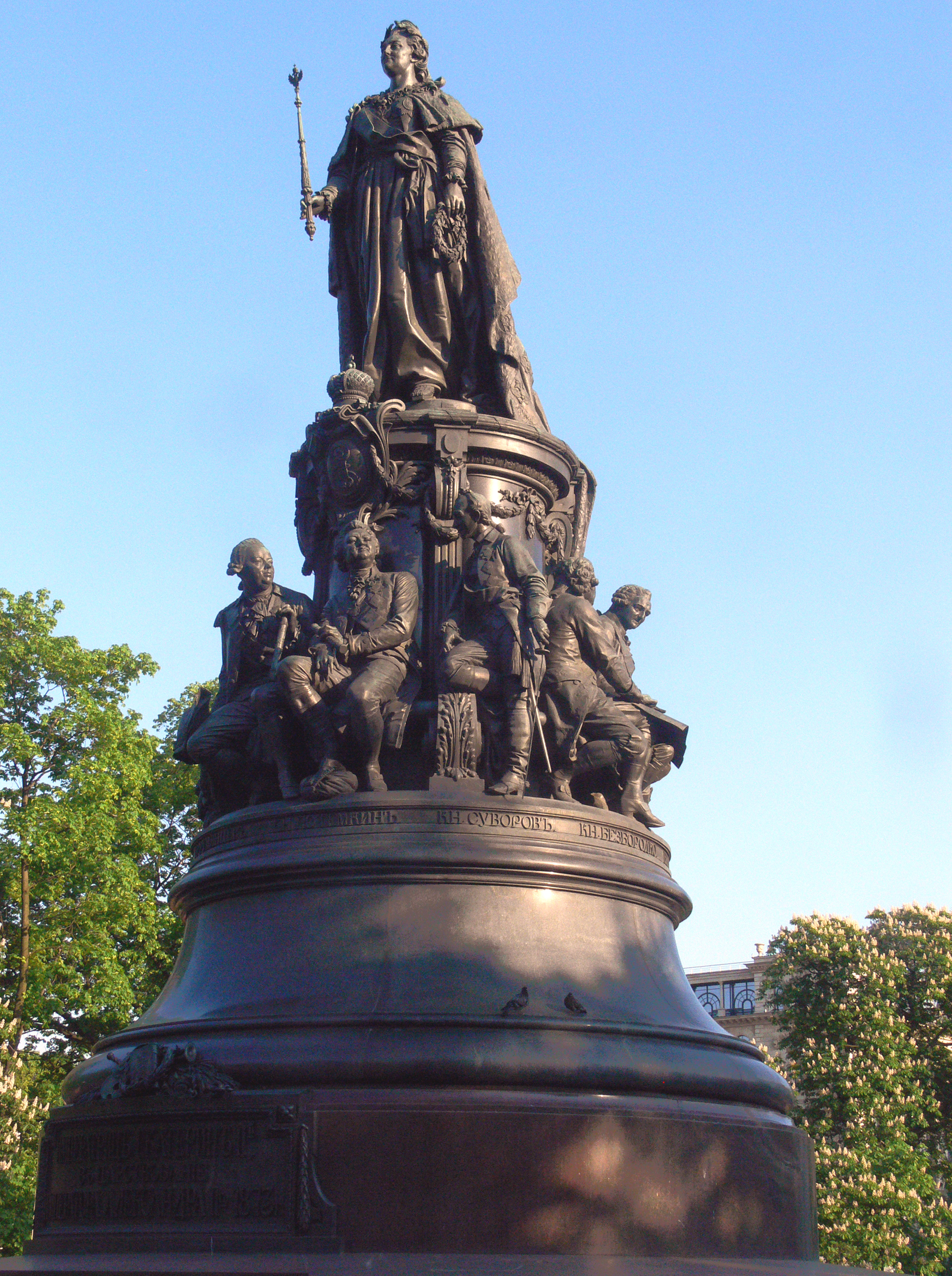
Monument to Catherine the Great in St. Petersburg (photo by Christian Bickel)

Matvey Afanasyevich Chizhov (Russian: Матве́й Афана́сьевич Чижо́в; 1838–1916) was a Russian sculptor.

== Biography ==
Chizhov was born the son of a peasant mason on November 10, 1838, in the village of Pudov in the Podolsky District of Moscow Oblast. Chizhov's father had a small workshop and made tombstones for the Moscow German cemetery. Even as a small boy Chizhov made clay figurines of animals, and from the age of eleven he helped his father in his work.

Chizhov studied at Moscow's German School of St. Michael, then attended the Stroganov School of Technical Drawing where he learned sculpting under Vladimir Brovsky, a graduate of that school. Brovsky recommended him to Nikolai Ramazanov, a professor at the Moscow School of Painting, Sculpture and Architecture, and advised Ramazanov to take the talented young man into the institution.

There, Chizhov began to systematically study sculpture and quickly showed his adeptness. In 1858, he fashioned a high relief sculpture, "Champions", for which the school awarded him a silver medal. Another high relief, "Agony of the Saviour", also won Chizhov a silver medal.

Ramazanov took on Chizhov as his assistant in the execution of works for the Cathedral of Christ the Saviour in Moscow. Chizhov, working from the drawings and sketches of his mentor, produced for the cathedral the huge high relief sculpture ""Christ's Descent into Hell". He also produced for two other Moscow churches the high reliefs "Assumption" and "Saint Nicholas".

Chizhov was soon invited by Mikhail Mikeshin to participate in the project to create "Millennium of Russia", a large monument erected in Novgorod in 1863. Chizhov created the high relief figures "Heroes", "Enlightenment", and "Statesmen" for this monument.

Chizhov moved to St. Petersburg, where in 1863 he enrolled in the Imperial Academy of Arts, where he studied under Peter Klodt and Nikolai Pimenov. Chizhov soon won two silver medals for sculpting from life and a small gold medal in 1865 for "Kievan riding with a bridle in his hands through the camp of the Pechenegs", a bronze copy of which exists at the Russian Museum in Petersburg.

Chizhov's studies did not prevent him from performing a variety of private commissions and work for Mikeshin, including drawings for a model of the St. Petersburg monument to Catherine the Great and the fashioning of parts of this colossal monument to the empress.

Chizhov was graduated from the academy in 1867 with the title of Expert Artist of the First Degree and a large gold medal earned for a high relief of Christ's resurrection, copies of which are now located at the academy and in the Russian Museum. He then traveled in Europe, visiting several cities in Germany, Austria, and Italy before settling in Rome, where he spent six years in continuous work.

== Works ==
Of the numerous works executed by Chizhov during this period, the most noteworthy are:

- "The game of hide and seek" (at the Russian Museum)
- "First love"
- "The unfortunate peasant" (at the Moscow Public Museum)
- "Frolicsome girl", a graceful figure of a girl crossing a stream on a log (many copies were made of this popular sculpture; one is at Livadia Palace)

All of these works were exhibited in St. Petersburg. The first two earned the artist, in 1873, the title of Academician. "The unfortunate peasant" earned, in 1874, a gold medal established by the academy by the bequest of A. Rzhevsk and N. Demidov. "Frolicsome girl" won the Le Brun gold medal, third class, at the 1878 Paris World's Fair.

Back in St. Petersburg in 1875, Chizhov taught sculpture at the Saint Petersburg Art and Industry Academy and was appointed as a sculptor and art restorer at the Hermitage. In 1893 he was made a member of the Academy of Fine Arts.

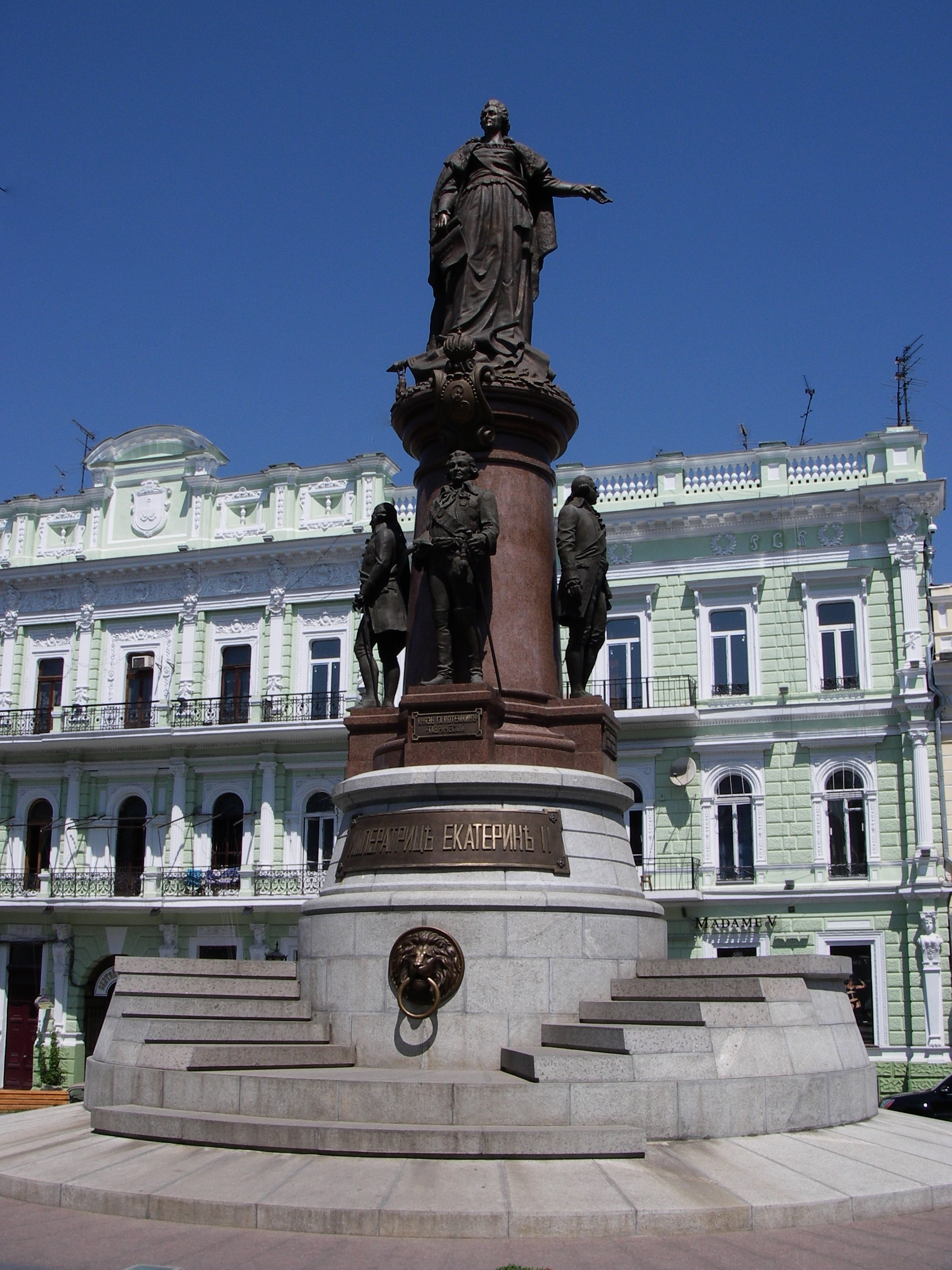
Monument to Catherine the Great in Odessa (photo by Jean & Nathalie)

In addition to the works already mentioned, some of Chizov's major works include:

- Busts of the Emperor Alexander II, created for the Kharkov Court of Justice and for the County Council of Perm
- Busts of Prince Peter Oldenburg (in the Imperial School of Jurisprudence) and of Mikhail Glinka (in the foyer of the Mariinsky Theater in St. Petersburg)
- Busts of the artist Alexei Bogolyubov and F. G. Gromov (in Saint Petersburg Art and Industry Academy) and Nikolay Nekrasov (in the cemetery of the Novodevichy Convent in St. Petersburg)
- A colossal statue of Ludwig Knoop in his monument at his Krenholm Manufacturing Company's factory in Kreenholm
- A great bust of Alexander II and decorations on the pedestal for the monument the emperor in Kalisz
- A large statue of Emperor Nicholas I for his monument in Kiev
- A monument to Admiral Pavel Nakhimov in Simferopol
- A monument to Count Mikhail Vilensky in Vilna
- A monument to Catherine the Great in Odessa
- Figure-group sculptures: "At the well", "The reading lesson", and others

Chizhov died on May 28, 1916, in Petrograd; his burial, at the Smolensky Cemetery, was lost soon after the Revolution of 1917.

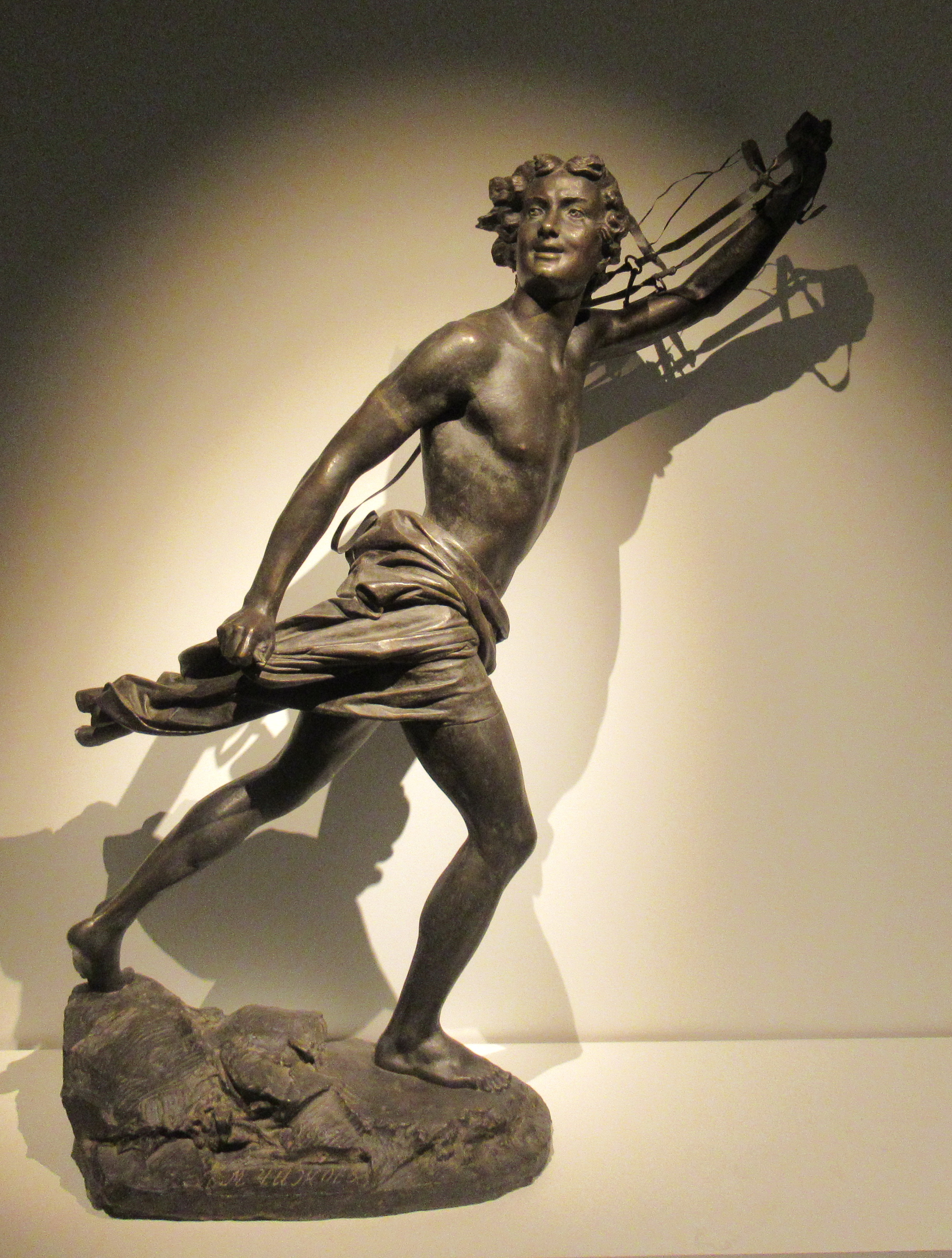
Running Boy from Kiev

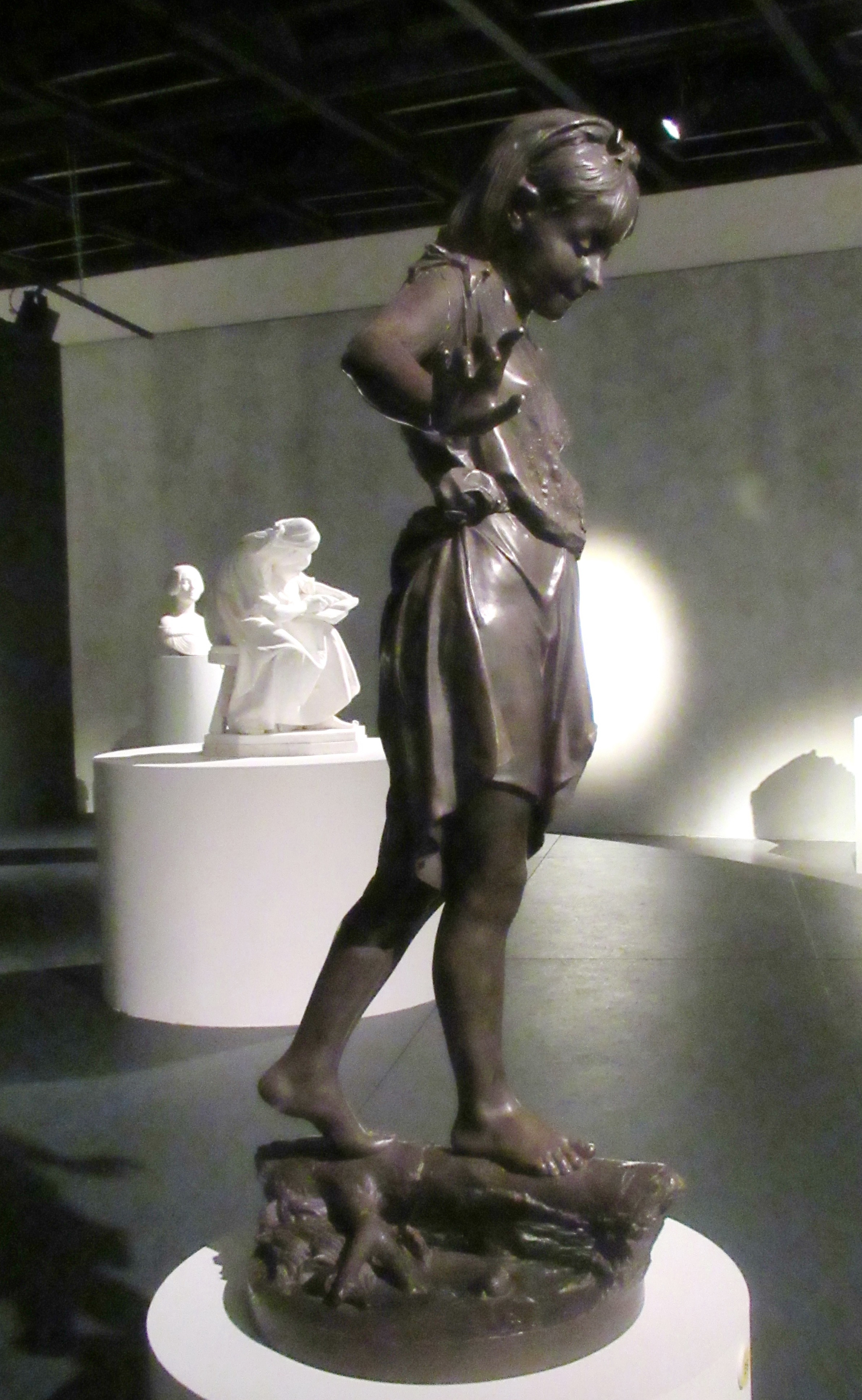
Frolicsome Girl

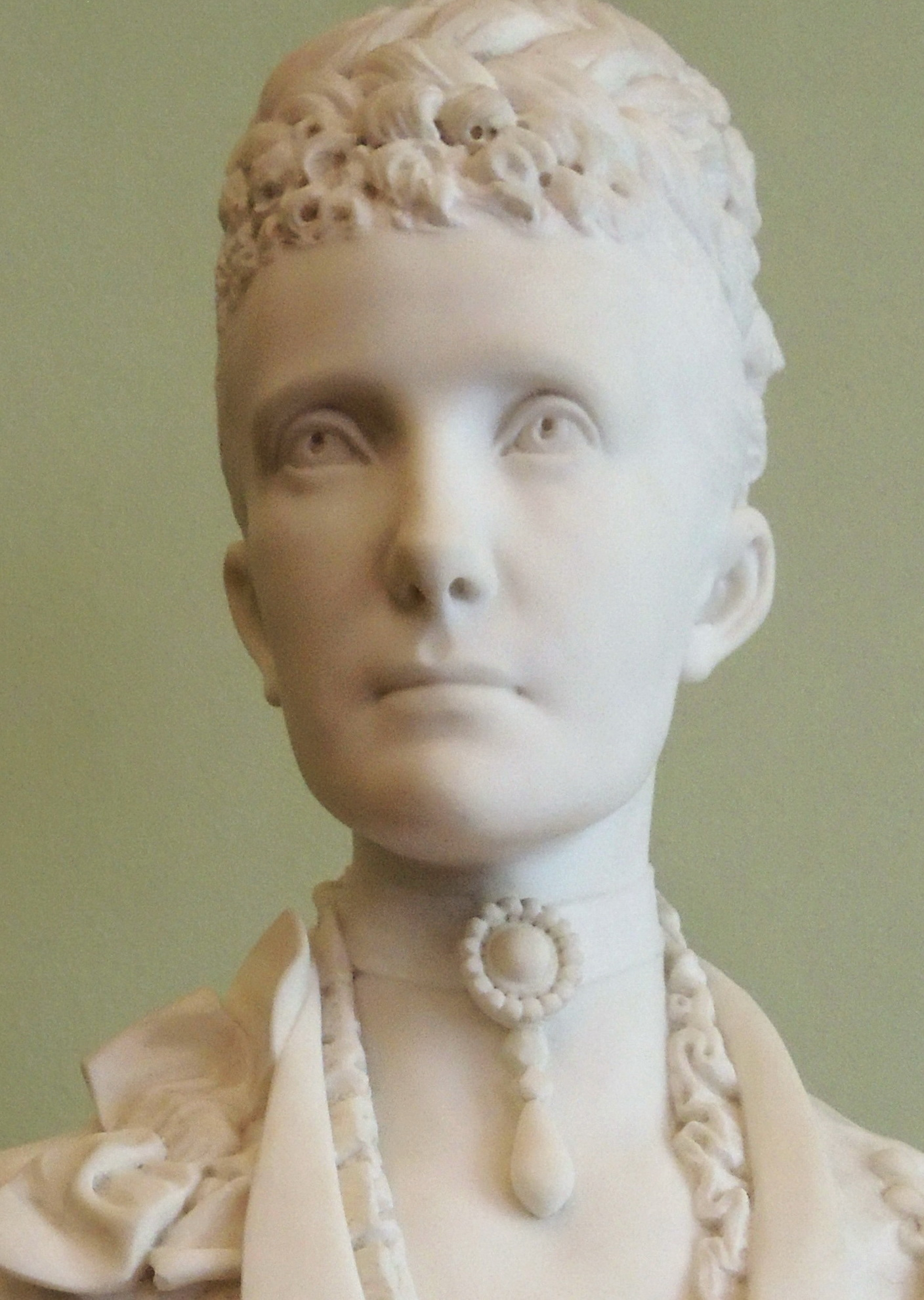
Eugenia of Oldenburg
