= Eugenia Kolosova =

Russian ballet dancer (1780–1869)

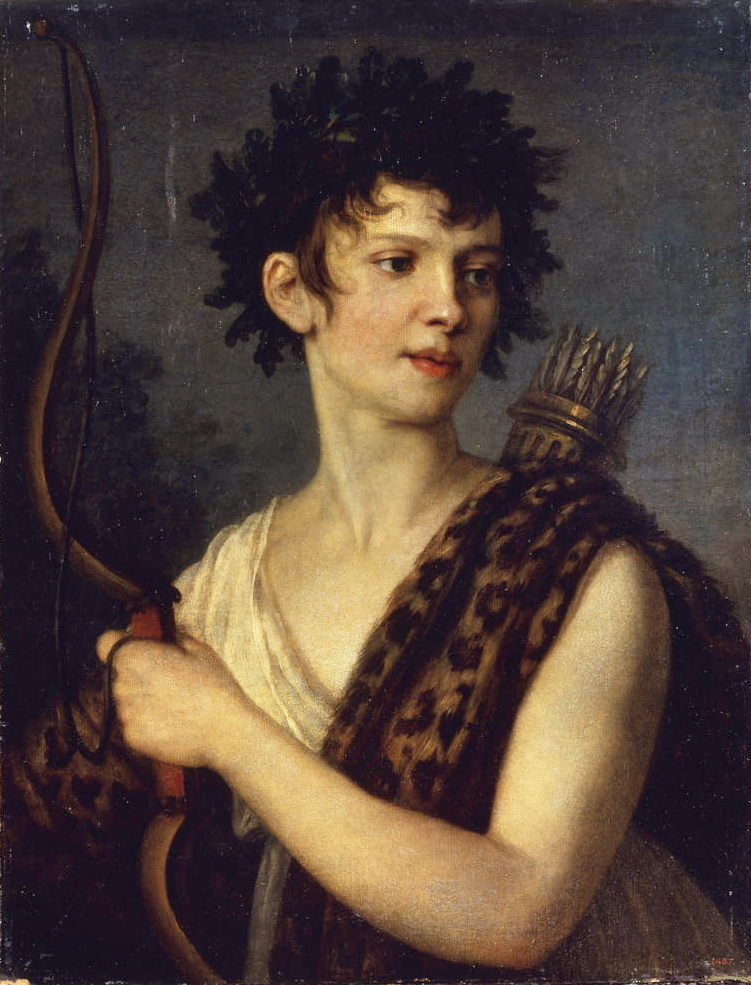
- Portrait by Alexander Varnek c. 1800s
- Born: Eugenia Ivanovna Kolosova; December 15, 1780
- Died: March 30, 1869 (aged 88); Saint Petersburg, Russia
- Years active: 1794–1826

Eugenia or Yevgeniya Ivanovna Kolosova (Russian: Евгения Ивановна Колосова; December 26 [O.S. December 15] 1780 – April 11 [O.S. March 30] 1869) was a Russian ballerina.

She was engaged at the Imperial Theatres from 1799 to 1826, during which she had a successful career as first a solo ballerina and later as a dramatic actress.

== Early life and education ==
She was born into an artistic family as the daughter of Ivan Dmitrievich Neelov (1746–1810), dancer of the Imperial Ballet. Since childhood, she has performed in musical and dramatic performances; at the age of 14, she successfully made her debut in the ballet Pygmalion by Jean-Philippe Rameau. After graduating from Saint Petersburg Theatre School in 1799, having been taught by Ivan Valberkh, she was accepted as a soloist in Imperial Theatres.

== Career ==
She performed the title roles in ballets staged by her teacher Valberkh, as well as choreographers Charles Le Picq, Chevalier and Charles Didelot. The first ballerina to create the image of her contemporary on the Russian ballet stage is the Girl (Titov's New Werther), Vasilisa (Russians in Germany, or the Consequence of Love for the Fatherland by Paris). She was one of the first to perform Russian dances on the ballet stage; one of the first in Russia to change the magnificent stylized costume to an antique chiton.

She also successfully performed as a dramatic actress in dramas and comedies. She left the stage in 1826.

She was engaged in pedagogical activities, among her students were ballerinas Maria Danilova, Avdotia Istomina and Anastasia Likhutina.

== Death ==
She was buried at the Smolensky Cemetery in 1936, the ashes were transferred to Tikhvin Cemetery with the installation of a new tombstone.

== Sources ==
- "Колосова, Евгения Ивановна" . Brockhaus and Efron Encyclopedic Dictionary (in Russian). 1906.
