= Vladislav Ozerov =

Russian dramatist

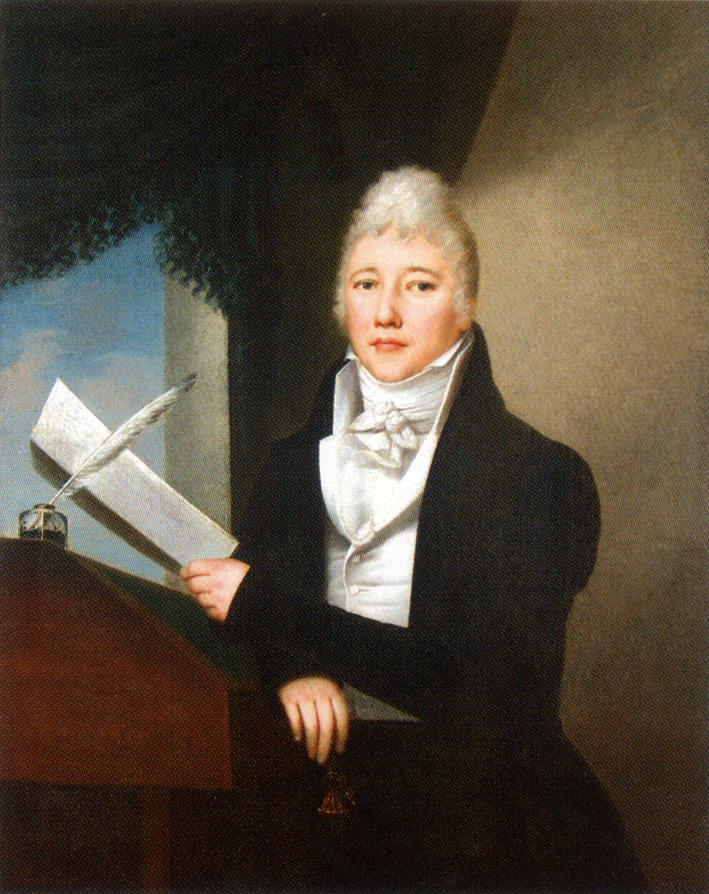
Vladislav A. Ozerov, portrait by Johann Rombauer

Vladislav Aleksandrovich Ozerov (Russian: Владисла́в Алекса́ндрович О́зеров) (11 October 1769 – 17 September 1816) was the most popular Russian dramatist in the first decades of the 19th century, a representative of Classicism and Sentimentalism.

Ozerov wrote five tragedies "in the stilted and sentimental manner of the Frenchified era". Their success was tremendous, largely owing to the remarkable acting of one of the greatest Russian tragediennes, Ekaterina Semyonova. What the public liked in these tragedies was the atmosphere of sensibility and the polished, Karamzinian sweetness that Ozerov infused into the classical forms.

Ozerov's first success was Oedipus in Athens (1804), a wry comment on Alexander I's rumoured privity to the murder of his father Paul. The public was ecstatic about his next tragedy, Fingal (1805), staged with effective sets representing sombre Scottish scenery. Dmitry Donskoy (1807) was staged within days after the Battle of Eylau, when its patriotic ethos was particularly apposite. (It was later used as the basis for an opera of the same name by Anton Rubinstein). His last play was Polyxena (1809), variously assessed as the finest sentimental tragedy in the language and the best Russian tragedy on the French classical model.

The production of Polyxena turned out to be a flop, largely due to intrigues adding to Ozerov's literary woes. He was forced to leave St. Petersburg for his country estate near Zubtsov, where he reportedly went mad and burnt all his papers. Ozerov's last years were spent in poverty, and his posthumous reputation was damaged by Pushkin's dismissal of his plays as "very mediocre".
