= Grigory Chernetsov =

Russian painter

- Григорий Григорьевич Чернецов
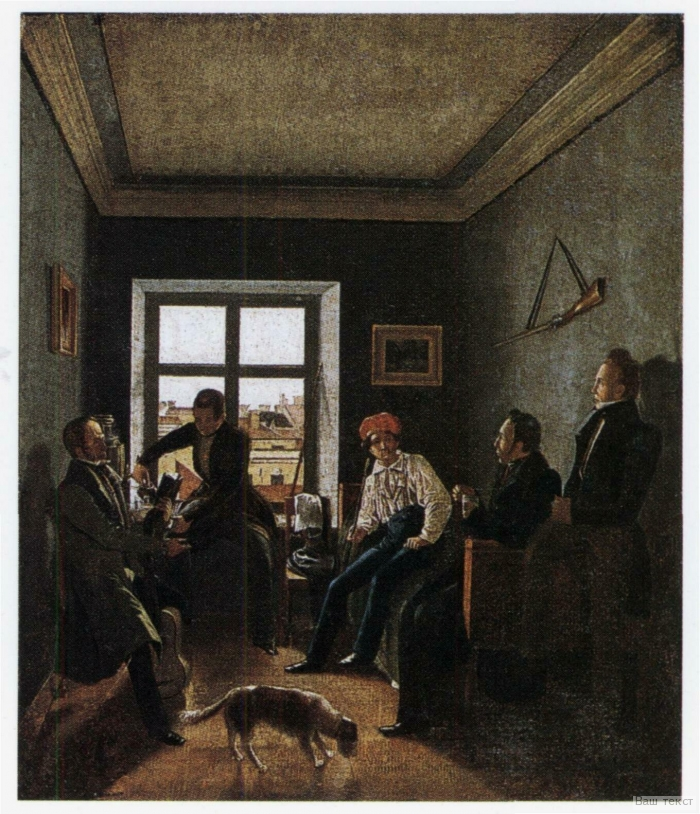
- Collective portrait of artists (1834); Grigory Chernetsov — at the samovar, against the window
- Born: November 12, 1802; Lukh
- Died: May 8, 1865 (aged 62); St. Petersburg
- Education: Member Academy of Arts (1831)
- Known for: Painting

Grigory Grigoryevich Chernetsov (Russian: Григорий Григорьевич Чернецов, 1802, Lukh – 1865, Saint Petersburg) was a Russian painter. He is notable mainly for landscapes of various parts of Russia, produced during his travels, but he also was active as portrait and genre painter.

== Biography ==
Chernetsov was born in Lukh, currently part of Ivanovo Oblast, Russia. His father and older brother, Yevgraf, were icon painters. His brother, Nikanor Chernetsov, three years younger than Grigory, became a landscape painter as well, and often worked together with Grigory Chernetsov.

In 1819, Grigory Chernetsov, encouraged by Pavel Svinyin, who was earlier travelled to Lukh, arrived in Saint Petersburg where he wanted to enroll in the Imperial Academy of Arts. He was not admitted. However, he got permission to work there two hours per day. He was not granted a fellowship and had to live with the support of his father, being constantly low on money. In 1822, he was granted the small Silver Medal for his drawings and accepted to the academy, where he studied under Alexander Varnek and Maxim Vorobiev. In 1823, Nikanor joined him at the Academy. The brothers graduated in 1827 with small Gold Medals.

After graduation, Grigory Chernetsov was hired as a staff painter at the court. His duties included producing paintings of official events such as military parades or official receptions. In particular, his best known painting, The military parade on October 6, 1831 in Tsaritsyn Lug, Saint Petersburg incorporates portraits of a number of his famous contemporaries, including Alexander Pushkin, Vasily Zhukovsky, Ivan Krylov, and Nikolay Gnedich. The painting was created from 1832 to 1837 and was eventually bought by the state and given as a present to the future Tsar, Alexander II.

From 1837 on, the Chernetsov brothers worked together. In 1838, they travelled down the Volga between Rybinsk and Astrakhan, making landscape sketches on their way, and later using these sketches to make paintings. They also produced a 700 metres (2,300 ft) long panorama of the banks of the Volga which eventually was accepted as a gift by Nicholas I. In the 1840s, they travelled over Italy and the Middle East, but attempts to sell the resulting lithographs in Russia were highly unsuccessful. When Grigory Chernetsov died in 1865, his brother did not have enough money to bury him.

In 1833, the Chernetsov brothers lobbied creation of the first high school in Lukh.

== Works ==
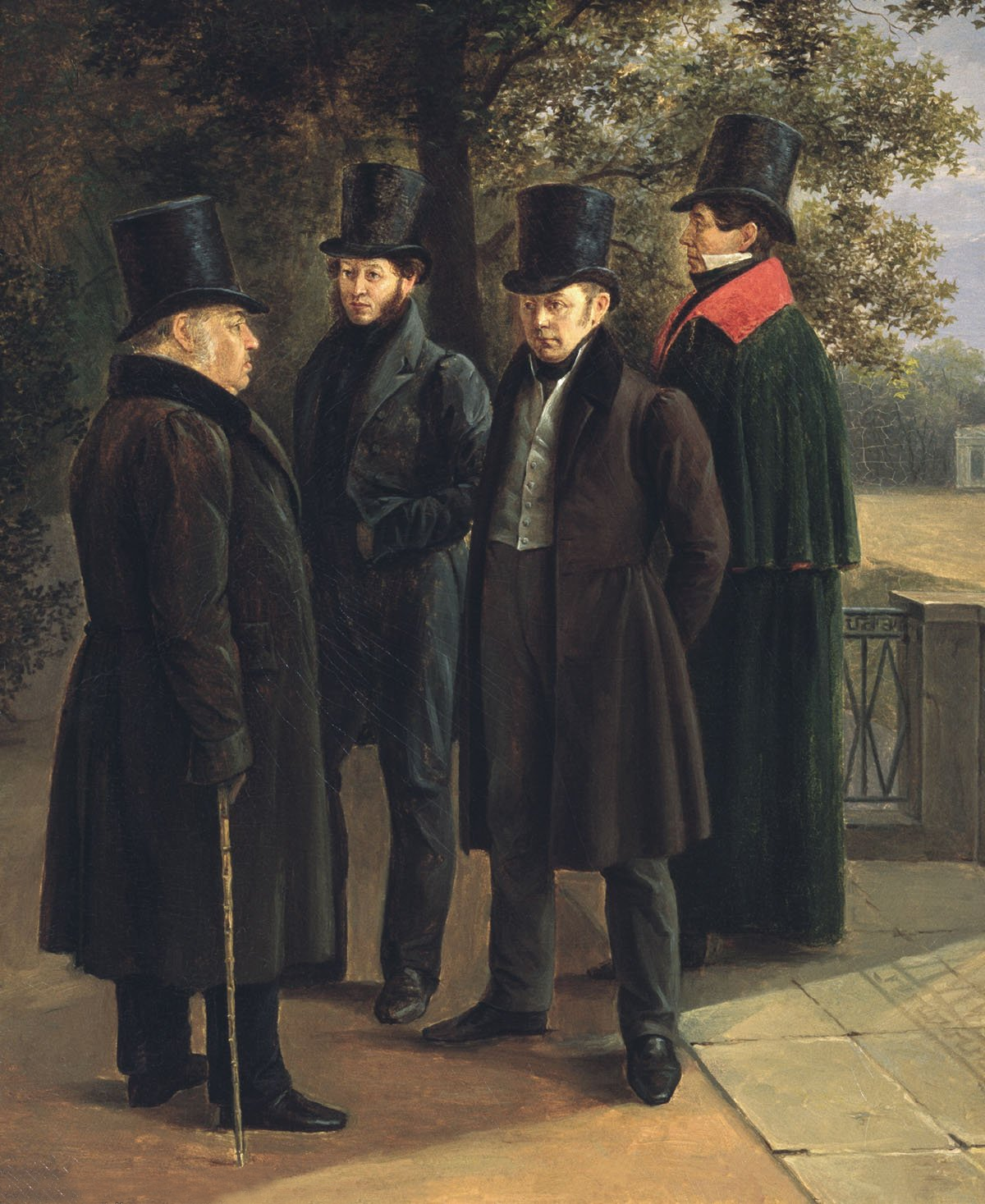
Collective portrait of Ivan Krylov, Alexander Pushkin, Vasily Zhukovsky and Nikolay Gnedich

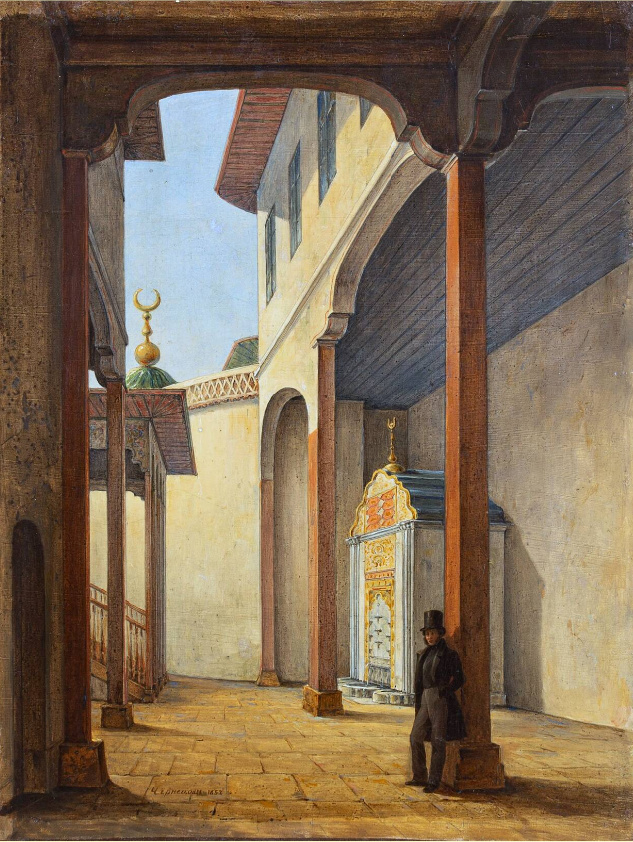
Alexander Pushkin in the Bakhchisaray Palace

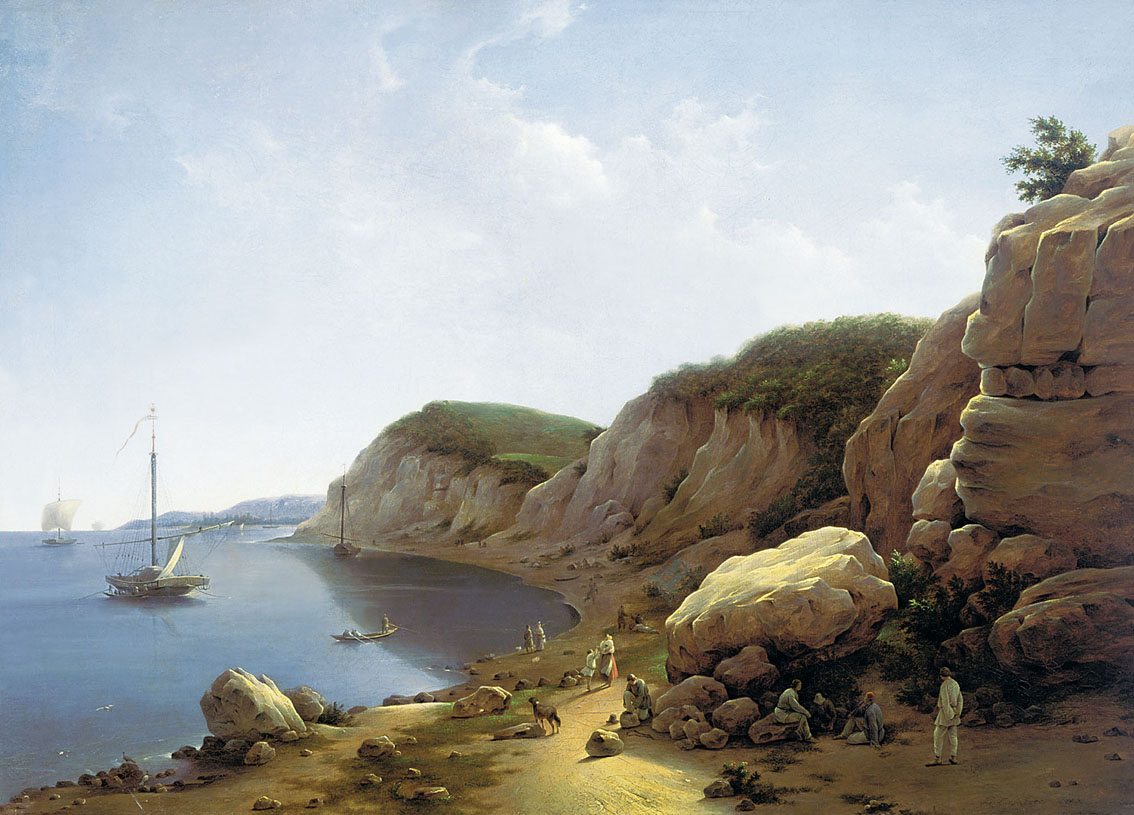
A view of the Syukeyevo "Mountains", on the Volga, in the Kazan Governorate (1840)

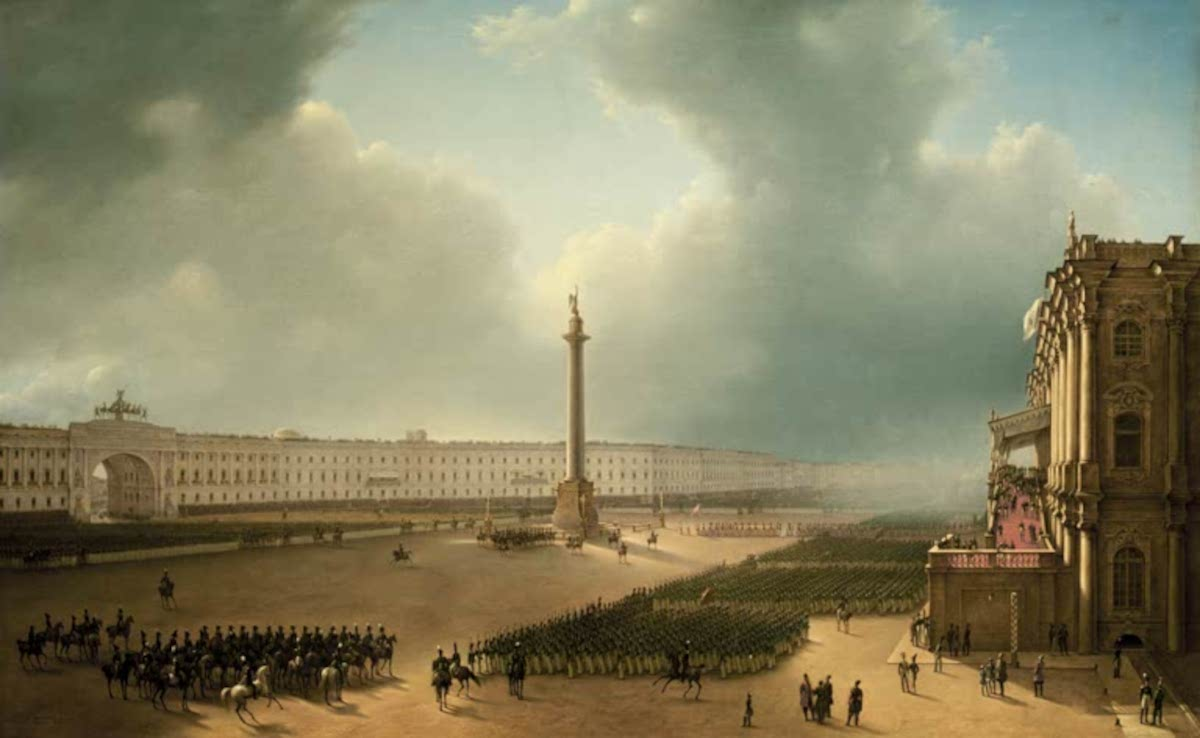
Parade in St. Petersburg in 1834 (1839)

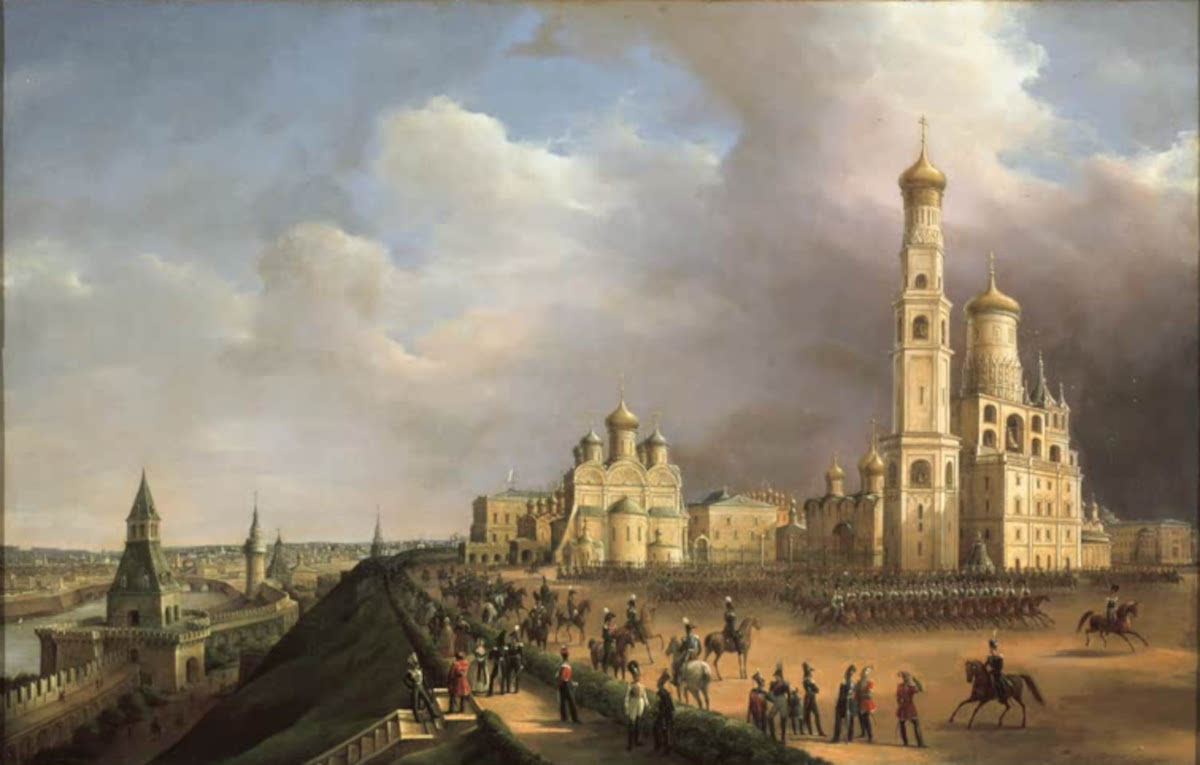
The parade in the Kremlin in 1839 (1841)

== Literary sources ==
- С. Н. Кондаков (1915). Юбилейный справочник Императорской Академии художеств. 1764-1914 (in Russian). Vol. 2. p. 216.
