= Samuil Galberg =

Baltic German sculptor (1787–1839)

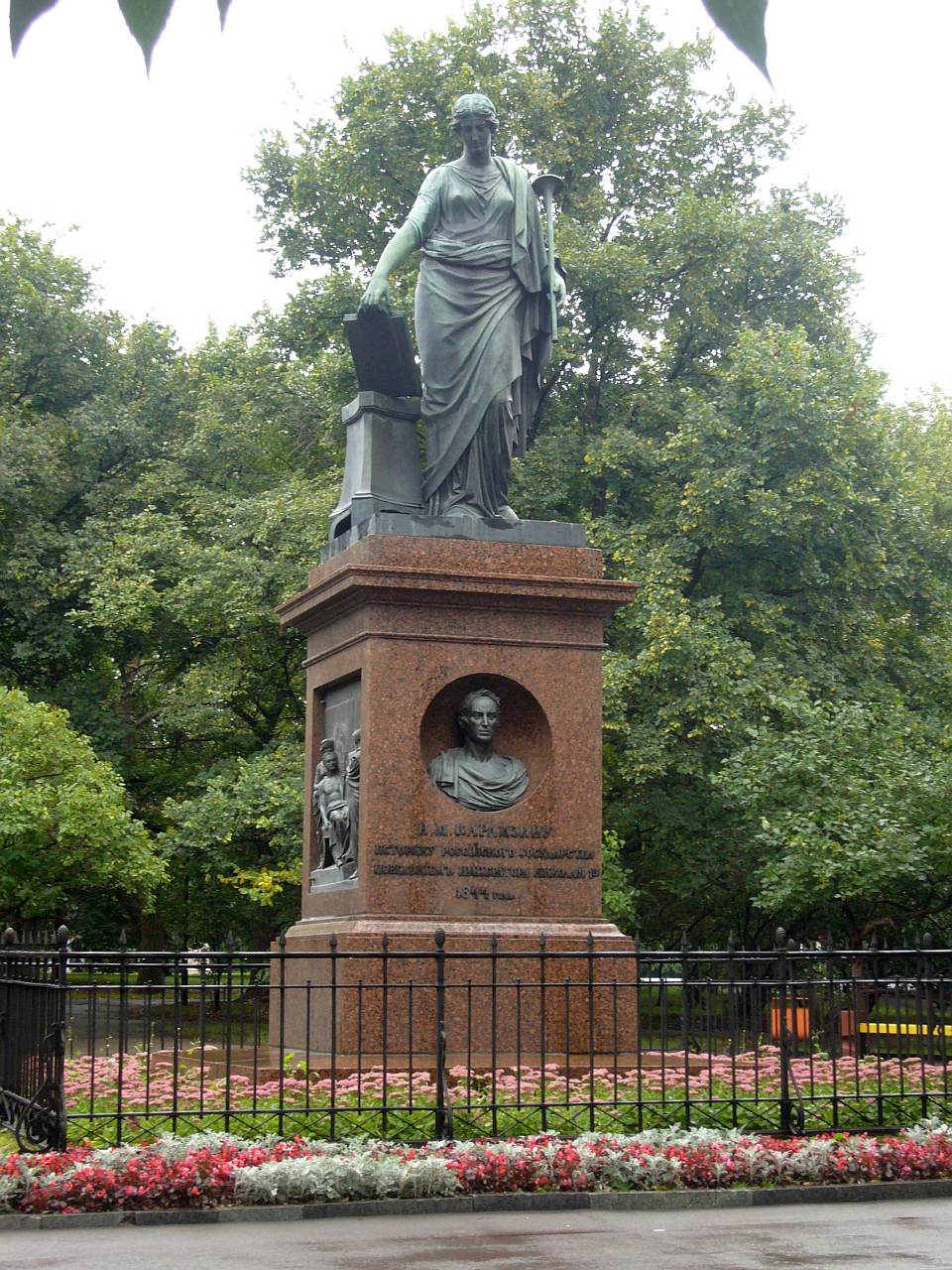
The Monument to Karamzin

Samuil Ivanovich Galberg (Russian: Самуил Иванович Гальберг), also known by his German name Samuel Friedrich Halberg (13 December 1787, Haljala Parish – 22 May 1839, Saint Petersburg), was a Baltic-German sculptor, active in Saint Petersburg during Tsars Alexander I and Nicholas I's reigns.

== Biography ==
He was born on a rural estate in what is now Estonia. From 1795 to 1808, he studied at the Imperial Academy of Arts under Ivan Martos. While there, he received several silver medals and a small gold medal, for a bas-relief depicting Shadrach, Meshach, and Abednego appearing before Nebuchadnezzar. He continued his studies in Rome from 1818 to 1828, where he obtained professional advice from Bertel Thorvaldsen.

Upon returning to Saint Petersburg, he became an adjunct professor of sculpture at the academy. In 1830, he was awarded the title of Academician. The following year, he became a professor in the second degree and, in 1836, was promoted to full professor, on the basis of his works, rather than by completing the usual academic program.

His wife, Elizaveta Vasilievna, was a daughter of the sculptor, Vasily Demut-Malinovsky. They had one daughter, Olga, born in 1838.

Many of his works are busts. They include Alexander Pushkin, Vasily Perovsky, Ivan Krylov, Dmitry Golitsyn, Pyotr Kikin, and his teacher, Martos. He also created two notable monuments; for Nikolai Karamzin (1836, Ulyanovsk), and for Gavrila Derzhavin (1833, Kazan, destroyed by the Communist government in 1932).

== Sources ==
- Kondakov, Sergei N. [in Russian] (1915). Юбилейный справочник Императорской Академии художеств. 1764–1914 (in Russian). Vol. 2. Saint Petersburg: Golike and Vilborg. p. 249. OCLC 707072219.
- Novitsky, Alexei P. [in Russian] (1914). "Гальберг, Самуил Иванович". In Nicholas Mikhailovich, Grand Duke of Russia (ed.). Russian Biographical Dictionary (in Russian). Vol. 4. Moscow: Lissner and Sobko. pp. 180–183.
- Osipov, Yury S., ed. (2006). "Гальберг Самуил Иванович". Great Russian Encyclopedia (in Russian). Vol. 6. Moscow: Bolshaya Rossiyskaya Entsiklopediya. p. 338. ISBN 5-85270-335-4.
- Petrov, Vsevolod N. [in Russian] (1978). "Самуил Гальберг и Федор Толстой". Очерки и исследования. Избранные статьи о русском искусстве XVIII–XX веков. Библиотека искусствознания (in Russian). Moscow: Sovetskiy Khudozhnik. pp. 107–116. OCLC 6044274.
- Ramazanov, Nikolai A. (2014). Belyaev, Nikolai S. (ed.). Материалы для истории художеств в России (PDF) (in Russian). St. Petersburg: Library of the Russian Academy of Sciences. ISBN 978-5-336-00162-4. OCLC 952577337.
- Somov, Andrei I. [in Russian] (1892). "Гальберг". Brockhaus and Efron Encyclopedic Dictionary (in Russian). Vol. VIII. Saint Petersburg: Brockhaus and Efron. p. 1.
