= Alexander Varnek =

Russian painter (1782–1843)

- Александр Варнек
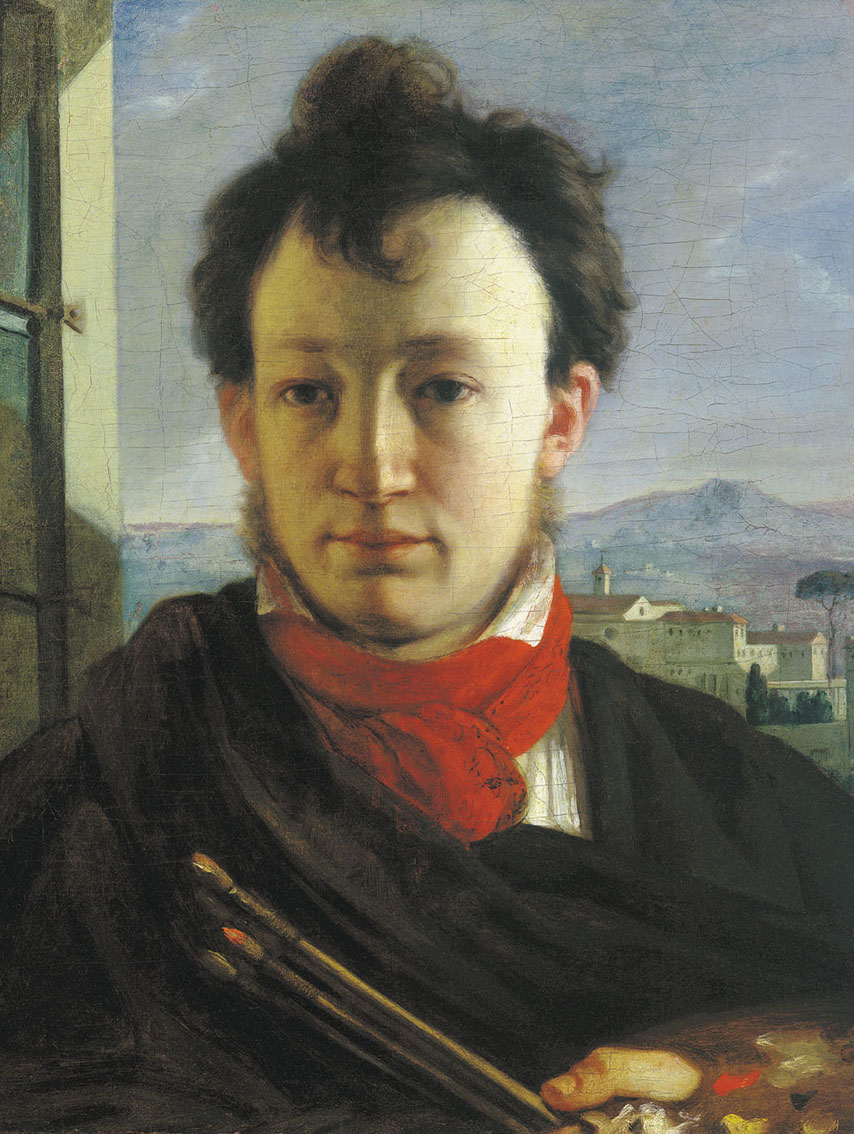
- Self-Portrait with a Palette and Brushes, 1804; Tretyakov Gallery, Moscow
- Born: 15 February 1782; Saint Petersburg, Russian Empire
- Died: 19 March 1843 (aged 61); Saint Petersburg, Russian Empire
- Resting place: Tikhvin Cemetery, Saint Petersburg
- Education: Imperial Academy of Arts (1803)
- Known for: Portrait painting
- Movement: Orientalist
- Awards: Big Gold Medal of the Imperial Academy of Arts (1802)
- Elected: Member Academy of Arts (1810)

Alexander Grigoryevich Varnek (Note: Also spelled Warneck, as in Thieme-Becker and Bénézit.) (Russian: Александр Григорьевич Варнек; February 15, 1782 – March 19, 1843) was a Russian Romantic painter and draughtsman of German descent, active in St. Petersburg during Tsars Alexander I and Nicholas I's reigns, best known for his portraits.

== Biography ==
He was a pupil of Dmitry Levitzky and Stepan Shchukin at the Imperial Academy of Arts. He went abroad (1801–1809) as a representative of the Academy and later returned as professor and advisor.

Along with other artists of the period, Varnek was somewhat restricted in his choice of subject matter due to the political climate and censorship that operated, especially during the reign of Nicholas I. Under censorship, artists were expected to be complacent about the conditions of Russian life. Patrons who commissioned work rarely strayed from acceptable religious and historical themes while artists who chose their own subjects tended to confine themselves to "safe themes." Thus, Varnek's specialty became portraiture.

In his own lifetime, he was regarded as a "celebrity artist."

== Work ==
He was particularly noted for his masterful drawing, his harmonious, if not particularly vivid coloring, the ability to capture a close resemblance, appropriate lighting, and in general for his conscientious execution without embellishment. Contemporaries highly rated his portraits, consequently he created many works of this sort. Particularly striking are his many portraits; a portrait of Madame Khatova (the wife of General Alexander Ilich Khatov), a life-size portrait of Count Alexander Stroganov, a portrait of the former president of the Academy, Alexey Olenin, and the paintings "Head of a Young Turk", "Boy with Dog", and "Fiddler". In addition, Varnek painted icons representing the Annunciation and the Four Evangelists. These latter are in the chapel of the Academy of Arts.

== Selected portraits ==
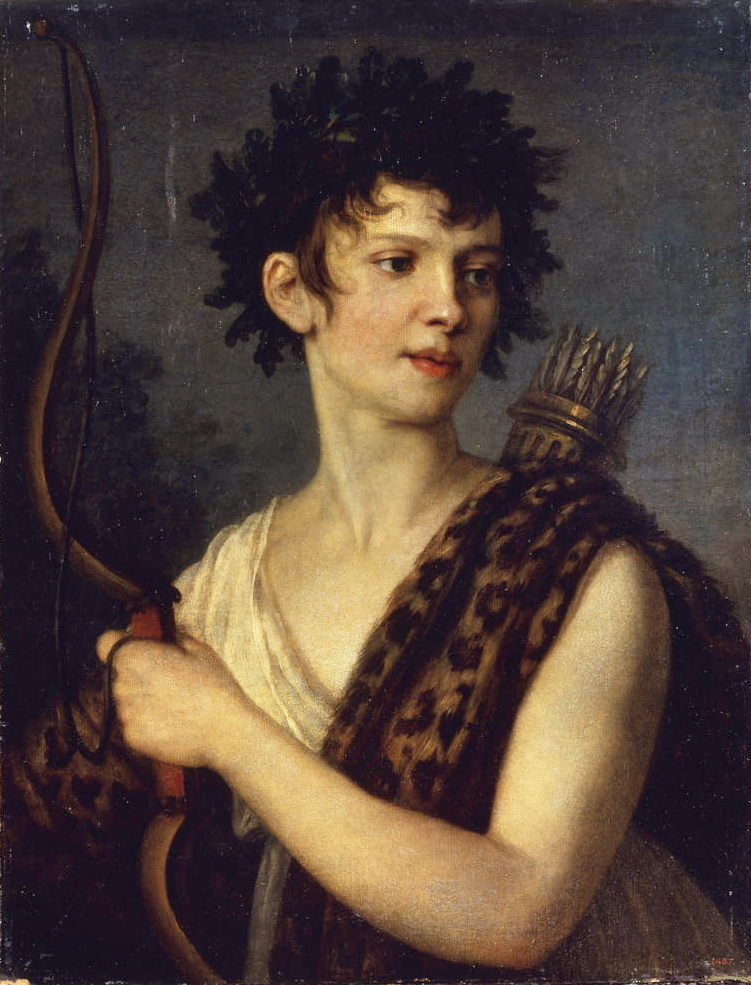
Eugenia Kolosova, c. 1802; Russian Museum, St. Petersburg

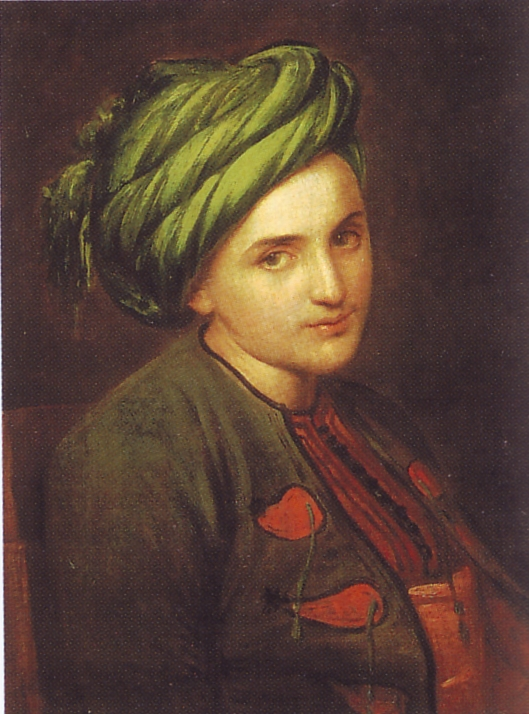
Captive Turk in Green Turban, 1810s; Russian Museum

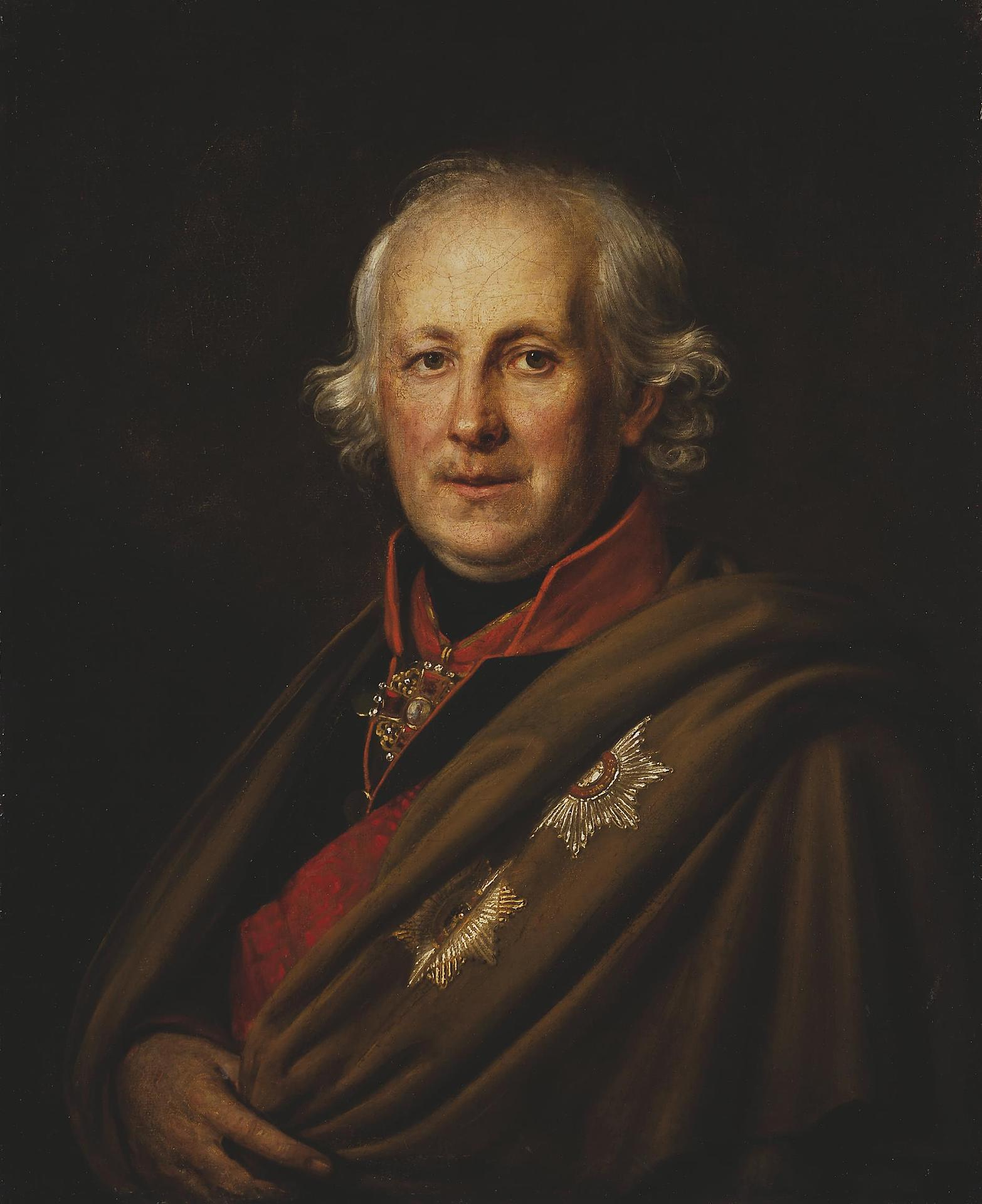
Nikolay Mordvinov, 1810s; Hermitage Museum, St. Petersburg

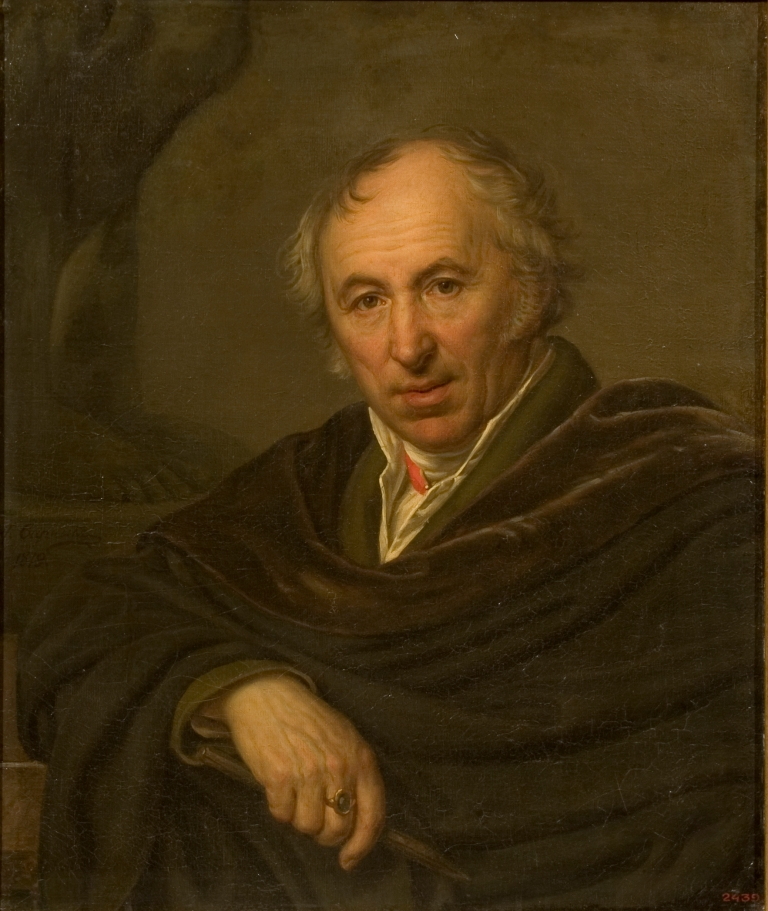
Ivan Martos, 1819; Museum of the Academy of Arts, St. Petersburg

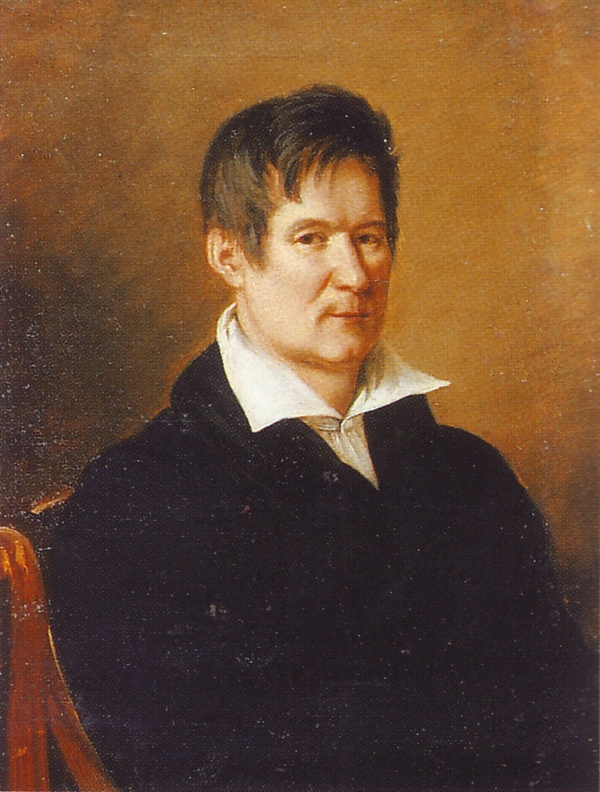
Vasily Stasov, 1820s; Russian Museum

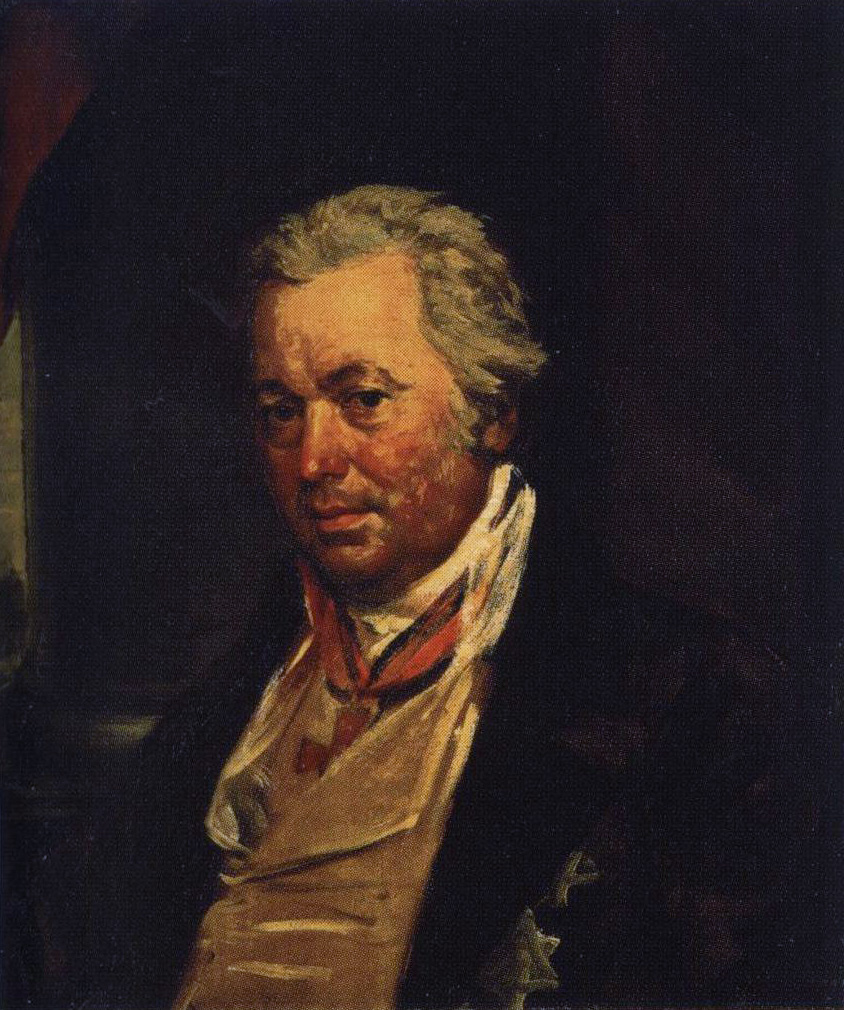
Gen. Alexander Rimsky-Korsakov, 1820s, unfinished; Tretyakov Gallery

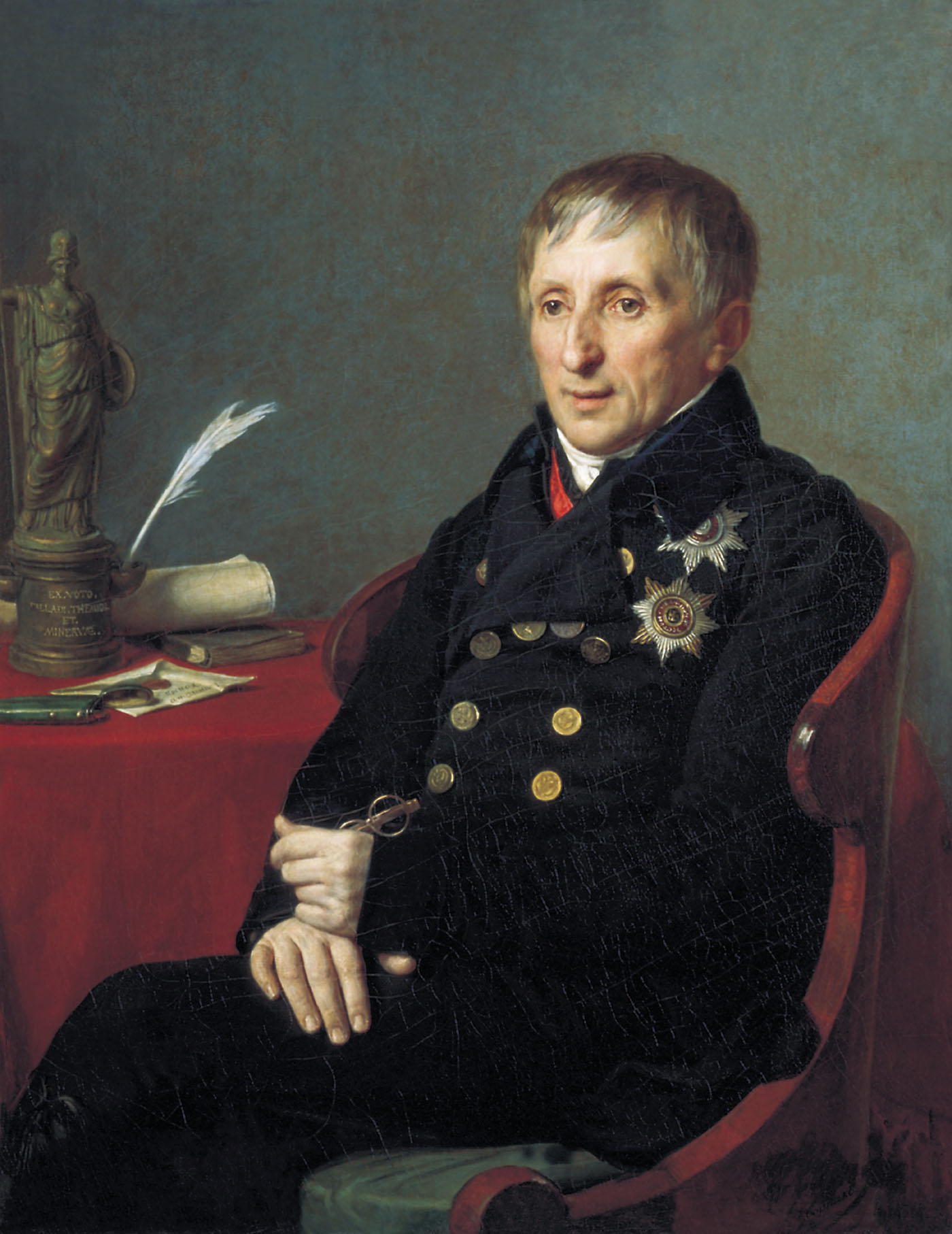
Alexey Olenin, 1824; Museum of the Academy of Arts

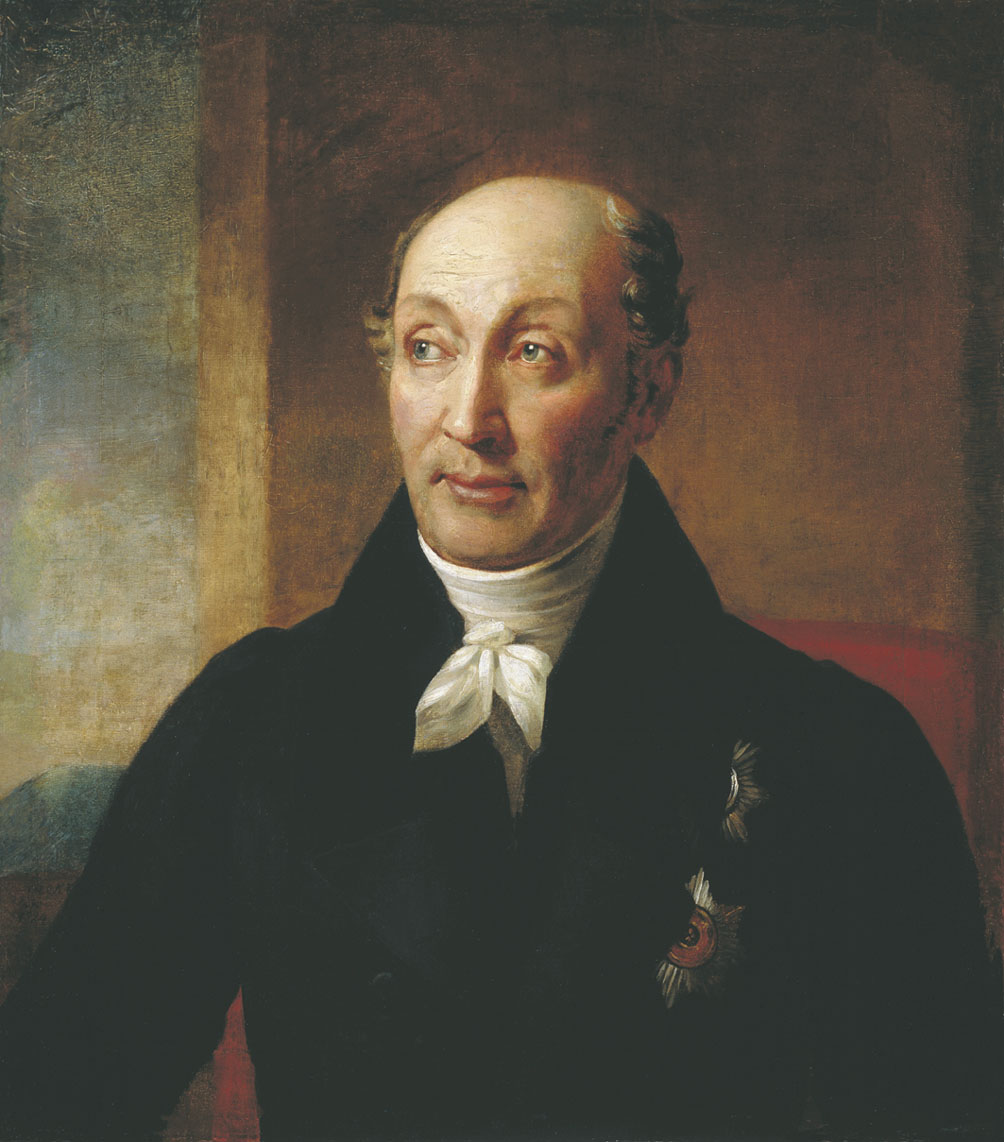
Mikhail Speransky, after George Dawe, 1824; Sukachev Museum, Irkutsk
