= Maria Valberkhova =

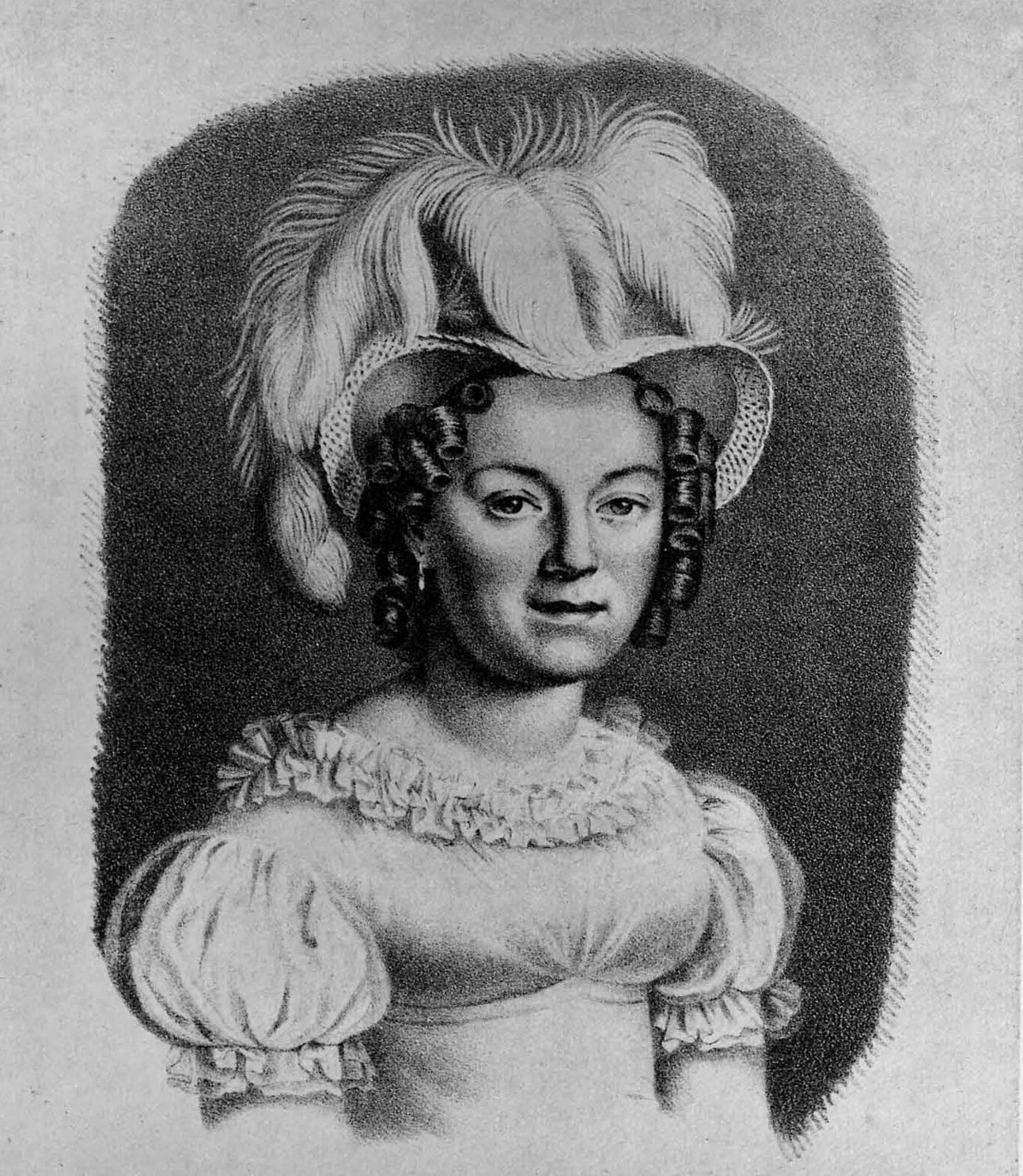
Valberhova Maria

Maria Valberkhova (1789 – 1867), was a Russian stage actress. She was engaged at the Imperial Theatres in 1807–1855, during which she had a successful career and referred to as the elite of her profession of her generation. Initially a tragedienne, she focused on comedies after the tragic parts was taken over by Ekaterina Semenova and became successful within comedy and eventually as a character actress.
