= House of Diligence =

- Дом трудолюбия (Russian)
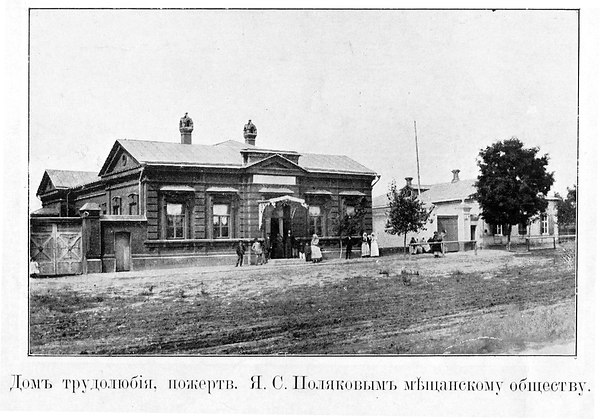
- Interactive map of the House of Diligence area

General information
- Status: converted into a domestic residence
- Location: Gogolevsky Lane, 114, Taganrog, Russia
- Coordinates: 47°12′14″N 38°54′34″E

The House of Diligence (Russian: Дом трудолюбия) is a building at 114 Gogolevsky Lane in Taganrog that was built at the end of the 19th century. The house remained until the 21st century, but has now been converted into a domestic residence.

== History ==
Yakov Solomonovich Polyakov was born in 1832 to a Jewish family, became a prominent banker, businessman, and founder of the Azov and Donskoy of commercial bank. One of his brothers, Samuil Solomonovich, was a contractor for several railroads; the second, Lazar Solomonovich, founded the Moscow Territorial Bank. Polyakov lived in Taganrog from 1868 onward. He opened a trading house, founded a horse-breeding center, and established a ship-towing company. Polyakov devoted much time to charities, and Polyakov founded the "House of Diligence" in 1898 as a philanthropic endeavor. This structure remains, at 114 Gogolevsky Lane.

The House of Diligence was funded by the Russian Empire. The founders wanted to help persons in need, without giving them a handout, and providing employment which would allow the person to earn money for life. Sometimes, the name was appropriated for educational institutions. At that time, children from the Jewish families could generally only receive vocational education in vocational schools, which existed on funds allocated by Jewish societies and individuals.

The school stood on a large plot of land. The property of the educational institution was estimated at 20,000 rubles. Yakov Polyakov spent about 2000 rubles annually for keeping of pupils. Polyakov, was given the title of the hereditary nobleman and was awarded with the rank of privy councilor. Polyakov died in 1909.
