= Šuchaúcy railway station =

Railway station in Belarus

Šuchaúcy Шухаўцы

General information
- Location: Šuchaŭcy, Vitebsk Region, Belarus
- Coordinates: 54°41′11″N 30°53′19″E
- System: Railway station
- Owner: Belarusian Railway
- Operator: Minsk Railway Department
- Line: Orsha-Shukovtsy
- Platforms: 2
- Tracks: 2

Other information
- Station code: 169026

History
- Opened: 1949
- Electrified: 1979
Location

Šuchaúcy (Belarusian: Шухаўцы, or Shukhovtsky (Russian: Шуховцы) is a railway station in Dubroŭna District of Vitebsk Oblast in north-eastern Belarus.

== Overview ==
The railway stop is in the village of Šuchaŭcy, six kilometers from the Belarusian-Russian border, close to the European motorway E30 (Belarusian part M1 highway. It was opened in 1949. It has two platforms There are two low coastal passenger platforms, interconnected by low pedestrian crossings, a small brick building of the railway station with ticket offices and a waiting room. Since March 18, 2020, trains don't stop in that station due to the outbreak of COVID-19 pandeimc in Belarus and in Russia.
