= Nikolai Pimenov =

Russian sculptor (1812–1864)

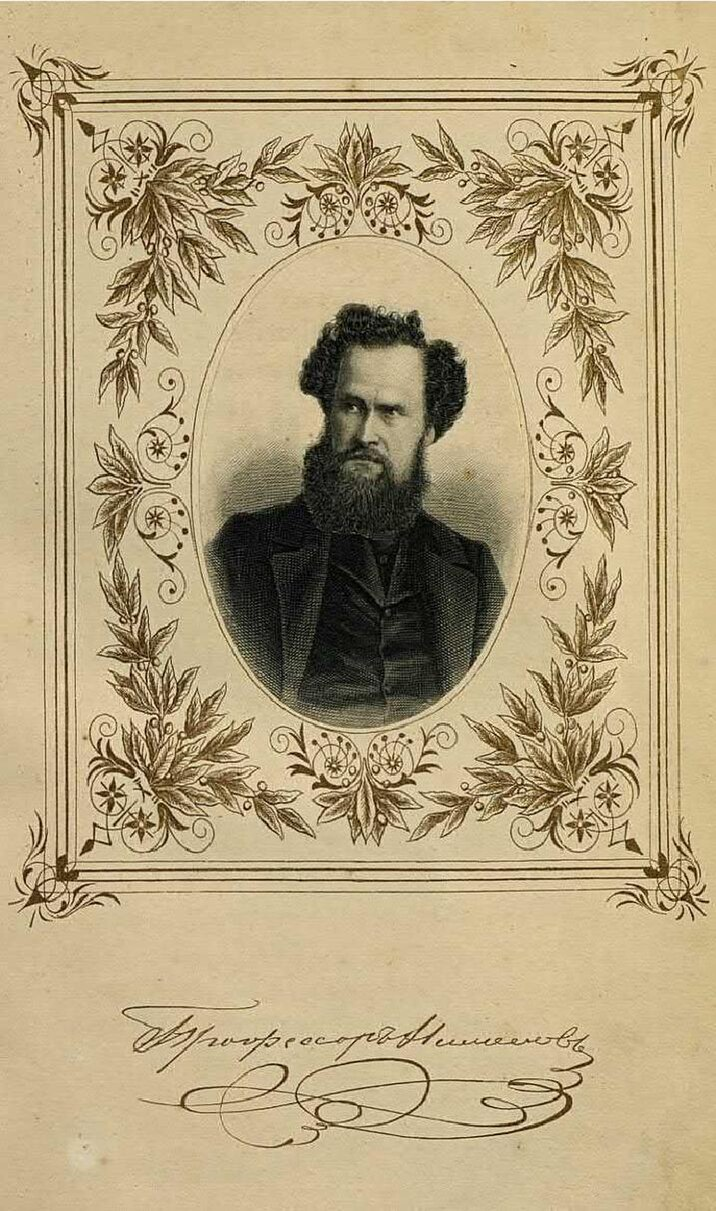
Nikolai Pimenov; portrait print by anonymous master, 1878

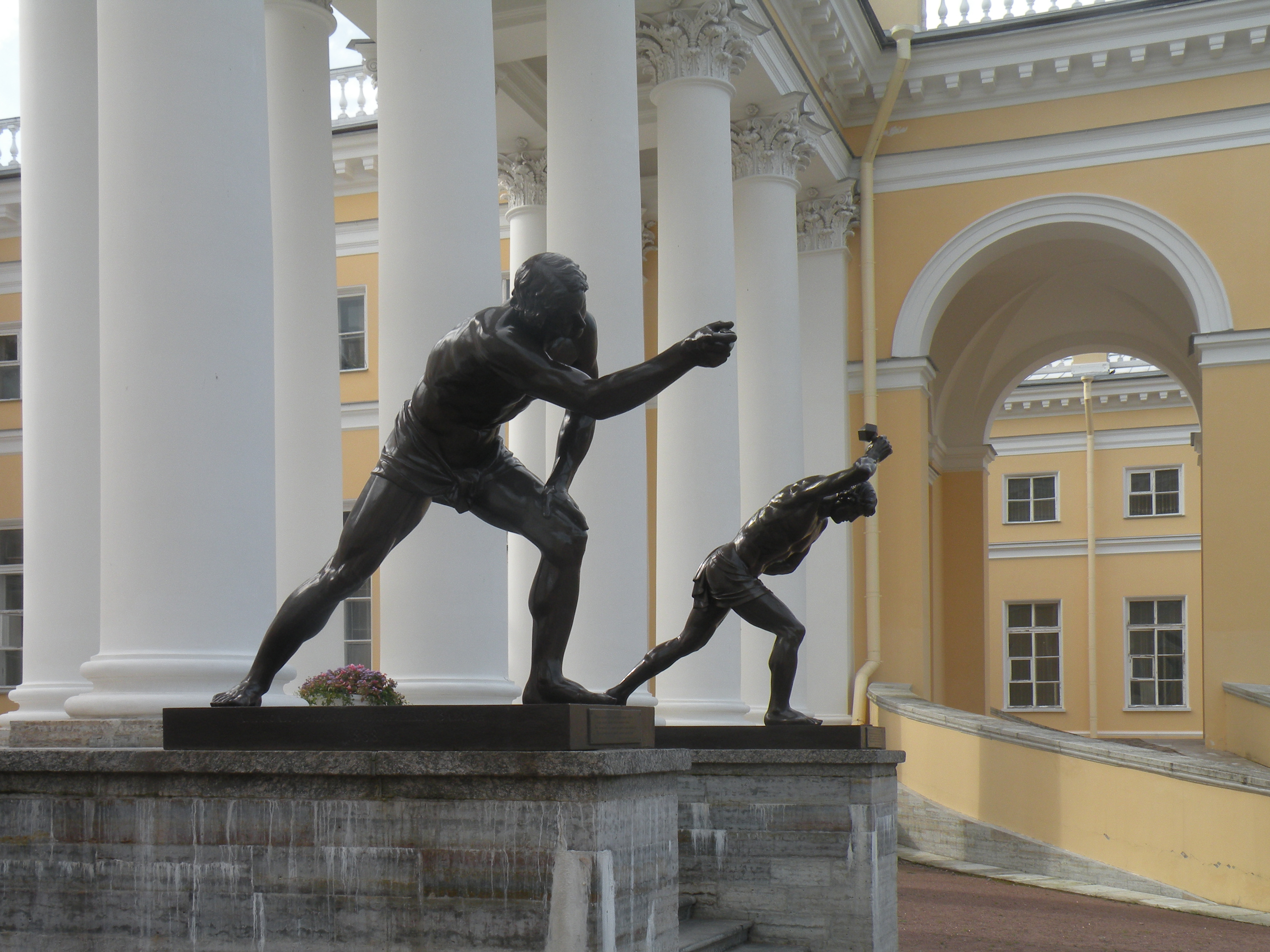
Foreground: "Youth Playing Babka", by Pimenov (Alexander Palace)

Nikolai Stepanovich Pimenov (Russian: Никола́й Степа́нович Пи́менов; 24 November 1812, Saint Petersburg — 5 December 1864, Saint Petersburg) was a Russian sculptor. His father was the sculptor, Stepan Pimenov.

== Biography ==
He studied at the Imperial Academy of Arts from 1824 to 1833, with his father and then Samuil Galberg being primary professors. During his time there, he received several silver medals, and a small gold medal for his rendering of Hector reproaching Paris (1833). He was a pensioner (grant recipient) of the academy from 1833 to 1836.

In 1836, he and Alexander Loganovsky presented a pair of statues with an unusual theme; two young men playing popular games (svaika and babka). They were awarded a large gold medal, and received praise from Alexander Pushkin. The following year, thanks to major grant, he was able to make a lengthy stay in Italy, where he spent time in Florence and Rome; modelling from nature. A work he created there in 1842, "Boy Begging for Alms", was instrumental in his being named an Academician in 1844.

He returned to Russia in 1850. Among his first works were a "Resurrection" and "Transfiguration", placed in two attics at Saint Isaac's Cathedral. In recognition of these works, he was named a Professor by the academy, in 1854. Shortly after, he became the Staff Professor of sculpture, and was named to the Academic Council. He taught from 1856 until his death.

He attempted to introduce Nationalist motifs into Classical sculpture. His students included Mark Antokolsky, Matvey Chizhov, and Fyodor Kamensky.
