= Dubrowna =

Town in Vitebsk Region, Belarus

Dubrowna Дуброўна (Belarusian) Дубровно (Russian)
- Town
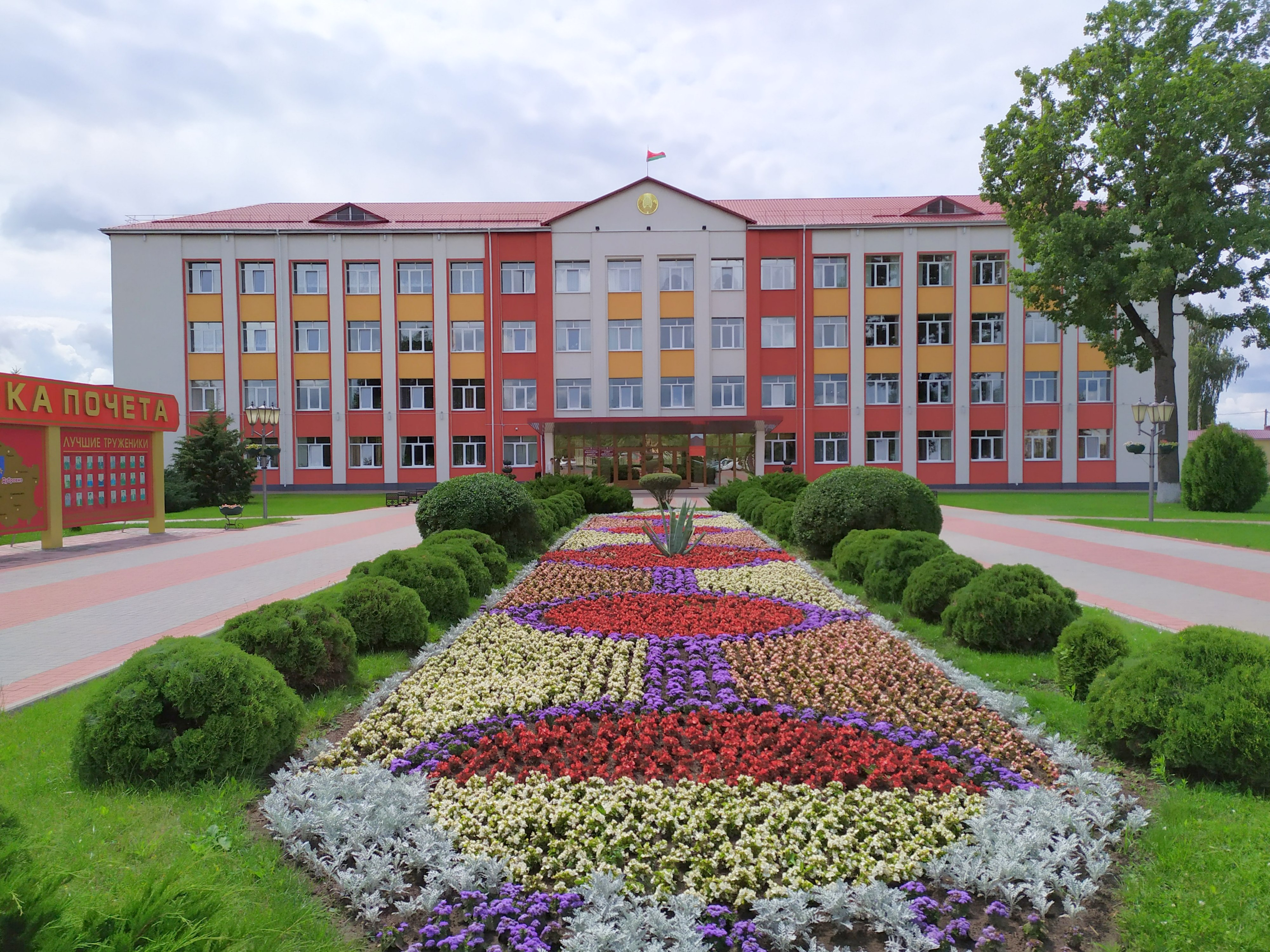

- Flag Coat of arms

- Location within Belarus
- Coordinates: 54°34′N 30°41′E
- Country: Belarus
- Region: Vitebsk Region
- District: Dubrowna District
- Elevation: 170 m (560 ft)

Population (2025)
  - Total: 6,945
- Time zone: UTC+3 (MSK)
- Postal code: 211040
- Area code: +375 2137

Dubrowna or Dubrovno (Belarusian: Дуброўна, romanized: Dubroŭna; Russian: Дубровно; Polish: Dąbrowna) is a town in Vitebsk Region, eastern Belarus. It is located on the Dnieper River and serves as the administrative centre of Dubrowna District. As of 2025, it has a population of 6,945.

== Etymology ==
The toponym originates from a Proto-Slavic term for an oak forest, which may explain the inclusion of oak leaves and acorns in the town's coat of arms.

== History ==
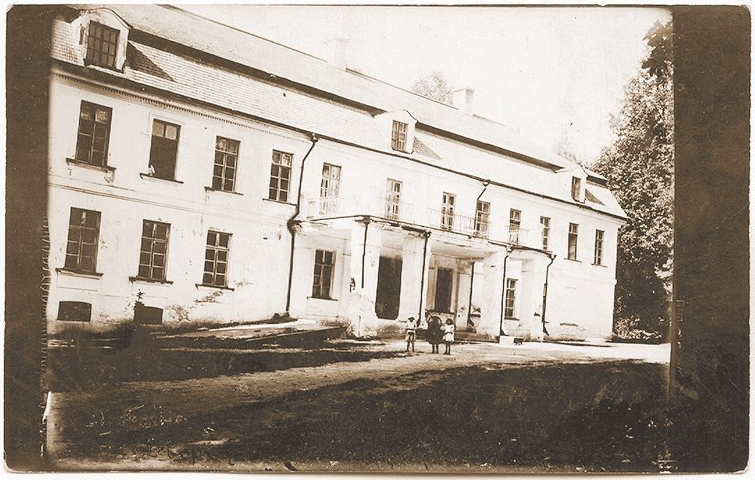
Lubomirski Palace in the early 20th century

It was a private town of the Hlebowicz and Sapieha families within the Polish–Lithuanian Commonwealth. During the Lithuanian–Muscovite War of 1512–1522 it was captured by the Muscovites in August 1514, and then recaptured by the Poles and Lithuanians in September 1514. During the next Lithuanian–Muscovite War, it was burned down by Muscovite forces in 1534. In 1630 Mikołaj Hlebowicz founded a Bernardine church and monastery.

Napoleon stopped in the town in 1813 during his retreat from Russia. In the 19th century Dubrowna was a centre for weaving. The town had a significant Jewish community that in 1898 formed more than half of its population.

During World War II Dubrovno was heavily affected. It was occupied by German forces July 17–20, 1941, and the town's Jews were killed. It was the scene of considerable partisan activity. From October 1943 to June 1944 it was at or near the front line, and was not finally reoccupied by Soviet forces until June 26, 1944.

Dubrowna hosts an annual folk song and dance festival, "Dnepr voices in Dubrovno".

== Notable people ==
- Harry Batshaw (1902–1984), jurist
- Israel Dov Frumkin (1850–1914), journalist
- Charles Jaffé (c.1879 - 1941), chess master
- Brothers Yakov Polyakov, Samuel Polyakov (1837–1888) and Lazar Polyakov (1843–1914), businessmen
- Kazimierz Siemienowicz (c.1600 - c.1651), military engineer and rocket pioneer
- Anna Tumarkin (1875–1951), professor of philosophy
- Menachem Ussishkin (1863–1941), Zionist
- Zvi Zeitlin (1922–2012), violinist
