= Alexander Loganovsky =

Russian sculptor (1810–1855)

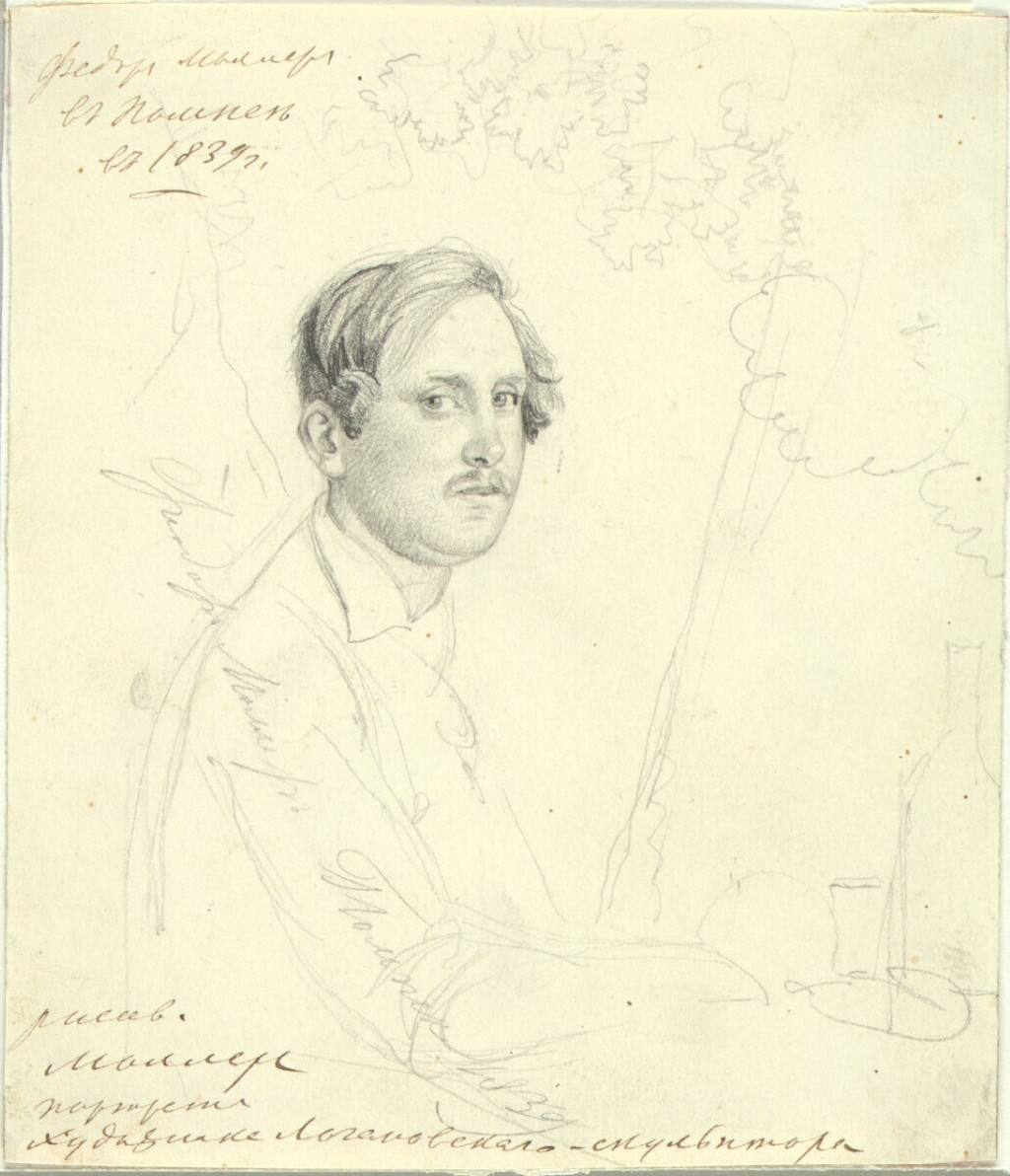
Fyodor Moller, Alexander Loganovsky, June–August 1839, pencil on paper; Tretyakov Gallery, Moscow

Alexander Vasilievich Loganovsky (Russian: Алекса́ндр Васи́льевич Логано́вский; 11 March 1810, — 18 November 1855) was a Russian sculptor in the Neo-Classical style, active in St. Petersburg and Moscow during Tsar Nicholas I's reign, known primarily for his bas-reliefs.

== Biography ==
In 1821, he began his studies at the Imperial Academy of Arts. During his time there, he was awarded several medals, including a large silver medal for his depiction of Jupiter and Mercury visiting Philemon and Baucis (1831), and a small gold medal for a bas-relief of Hector reproaching Paris (1832). The following year, He received a large gold medal for his statue of a young man playing svaika. This was created in conjunction with Nikolai Pimenov, who produced a statue of a young man playing babka. Both were praised by Alexander Pushkin in a short poem, and are now on display at Alexander Palace.

Following his graduation, he received a stipend to study in Rome. While there, he created a marble figure of Abaddon and a group depicting young people from Kiev in gypsum, for which he was awarded the title of "Academician". Upon returning, he created two bas-reliefs for Saint Isaac's Cathedral: an "Annunciation to the Shepherds" and a "Massacre of the Innocents".

Since 1839, together with Peter Clodt, Nikolai Ramazanov, and others, he had been involved in a project to create colossal relief images and figures of saints and angels for the outer walls of the Cathedral of Christ the Saviour; a project which took almost forty years to complete. In 1854, partly in honor of his work there, he was named a Professor at the Academy. He died the following year, aged forty-five; he's interred into the Vagankovo Cemetery.

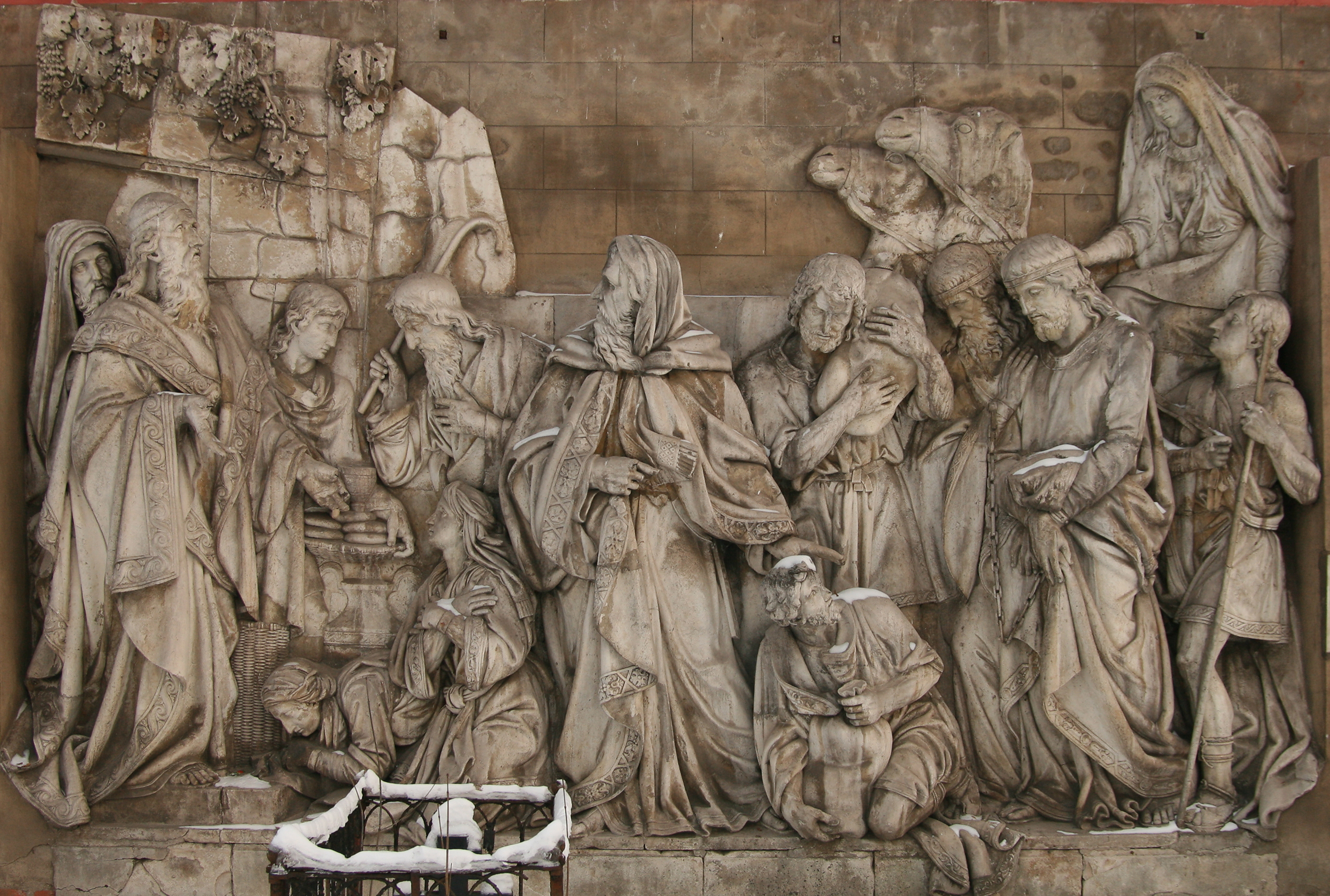
Melchizedek Blessing Abraham (Cathedral of Christ the Saviour)
