= Otto Friedrich Theodor von Möller =

Russian painter (1812–1874)

- Фёдор Антонович Моллер
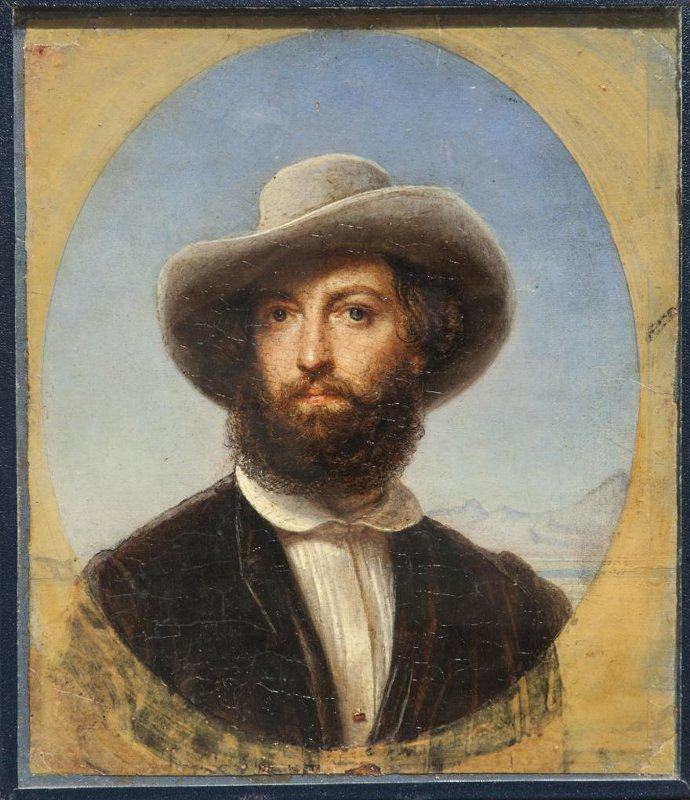
- Self-Portrait, late 1840s; Russian Museum
- Born: 30 May 1812; Kronstadt, Russian Empire
- Died: 21 July 1874 (aged 62); Saaremaa, Russian Empire
- Education: Imperial Academy of Arts (1838)
- Known for: Painting
- Notable work: Portraits of Nikolai Gogol (c. 1840–1842); Apostle John on the Island of Patmos (1856)
- Awards: Big Gold Medal of the Imperial Academy of Arts (1837)
- Elected: Member Academy of Arts (1840); Professor by rank (1857)

Otto Friedrich Theodor von Möller (Russian: Фёдор Антонович Моллер, romanized: Fyodor Antonovich Moller; 30 May 1812 – 2 August 1874) was a Russian Academic painter of noble Baltic German origin.

== Biography ==
Born in Kronstadt, Saint Petersburg, he was the son of Anton Berend Otto von Moller, also known as Anton Vasilievich Moller, a naval officer who later became Secretary of the Navy (1828–1836). At the age of five, he was enrolled at the cadet school, where he remained until he was 14, then served in the Semyonovsky Regiment. After being wounded in the Polish November Uprising, he took up drawing during his convalescence and decided to attend classes at the Imperial Academy of Fine Arts.

Once there, he became a favorite student of Karl Briullov. He first exhibited in 1832 with a scene of the Battle of Ostrołęka. In 1835, he was awarded a gold medal for painting and resigned from the army. He received another gold medal in 1837.

After graduating in 1838, he went to Italy to complete his studies. He continued to send paintings home and, in 1840, was named "Academician" for his work "The Kiss". While there, he also became a close friend of Nikolai Gogol and painted him several times, which portraits are among his best-known works.

After a brief stay in Russia in 1847, he returned to Rome, where he met Johann Friedrich Overbeck and the Nazarene movement. His work in that style, "Sermon of the Apostle John on the Island of Patmos", led to his becoming "Professor of Historical Painting" when he returned to Russia in 1856. That same year, he married Dorothea von Güldenstubbe, who was only sixteen.

Back in Saint Petersburg, he devoted himself to teaching and managing a pension fund for artists at the Imperial Society for the Encouragement of the Arts. His works include a series of paintings of Alexander Nevsky for the Grand Kremlin Palace and murals for Saint Isaac's Cathedral.

He was suddenly taken ill while working on the Crucifixion in the village of Võnnu (Wendau). He died of pneumonia at the family estate on the island of Saaremaa.

== Gallery ==
Narrative paintings

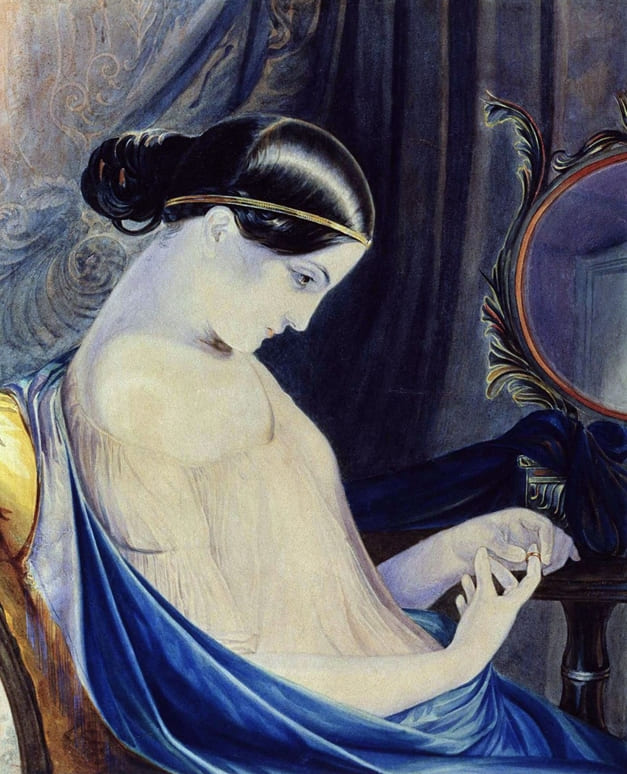
The Bride with a Ring

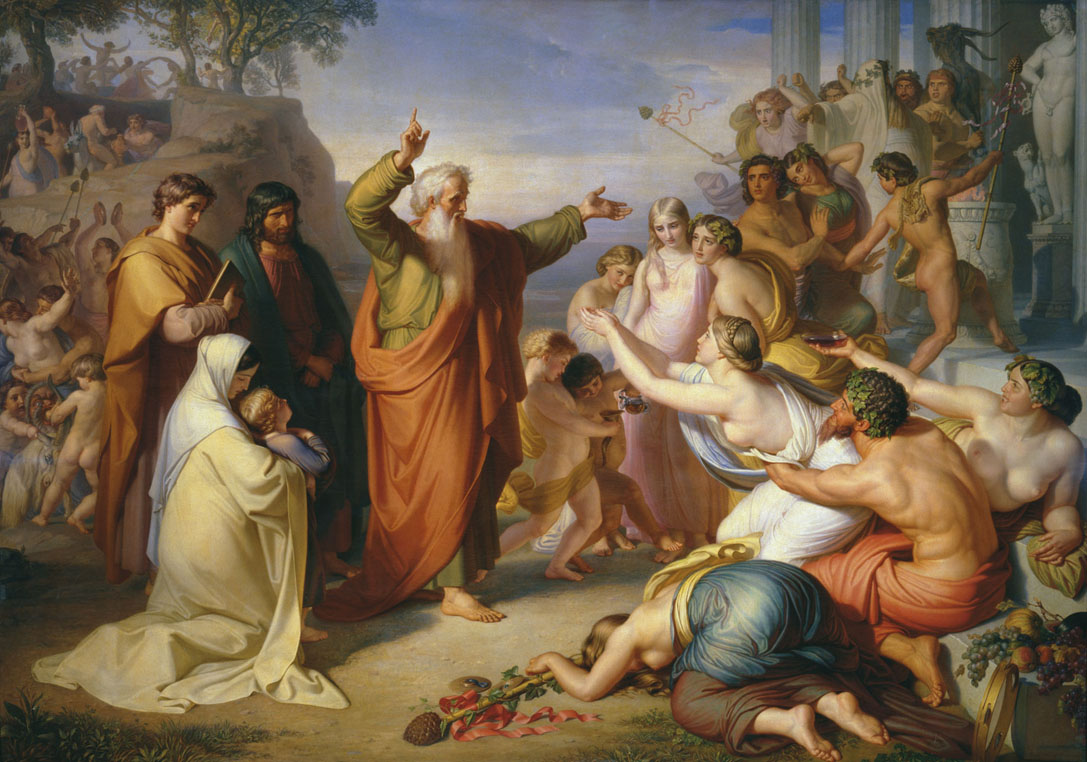
Apostle John's Sermon on Patmos

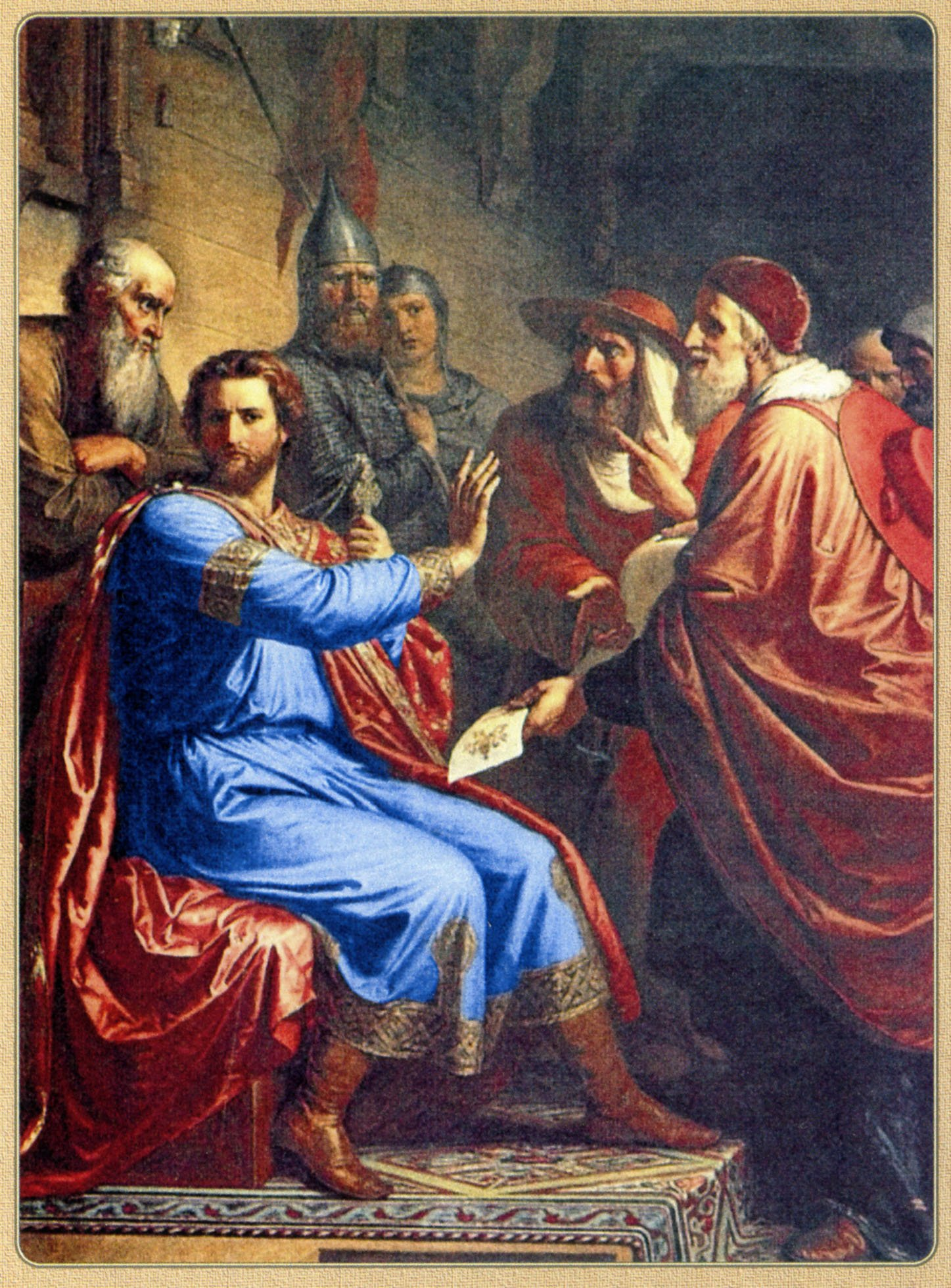
Alexander Nevsky and the Papal Legates

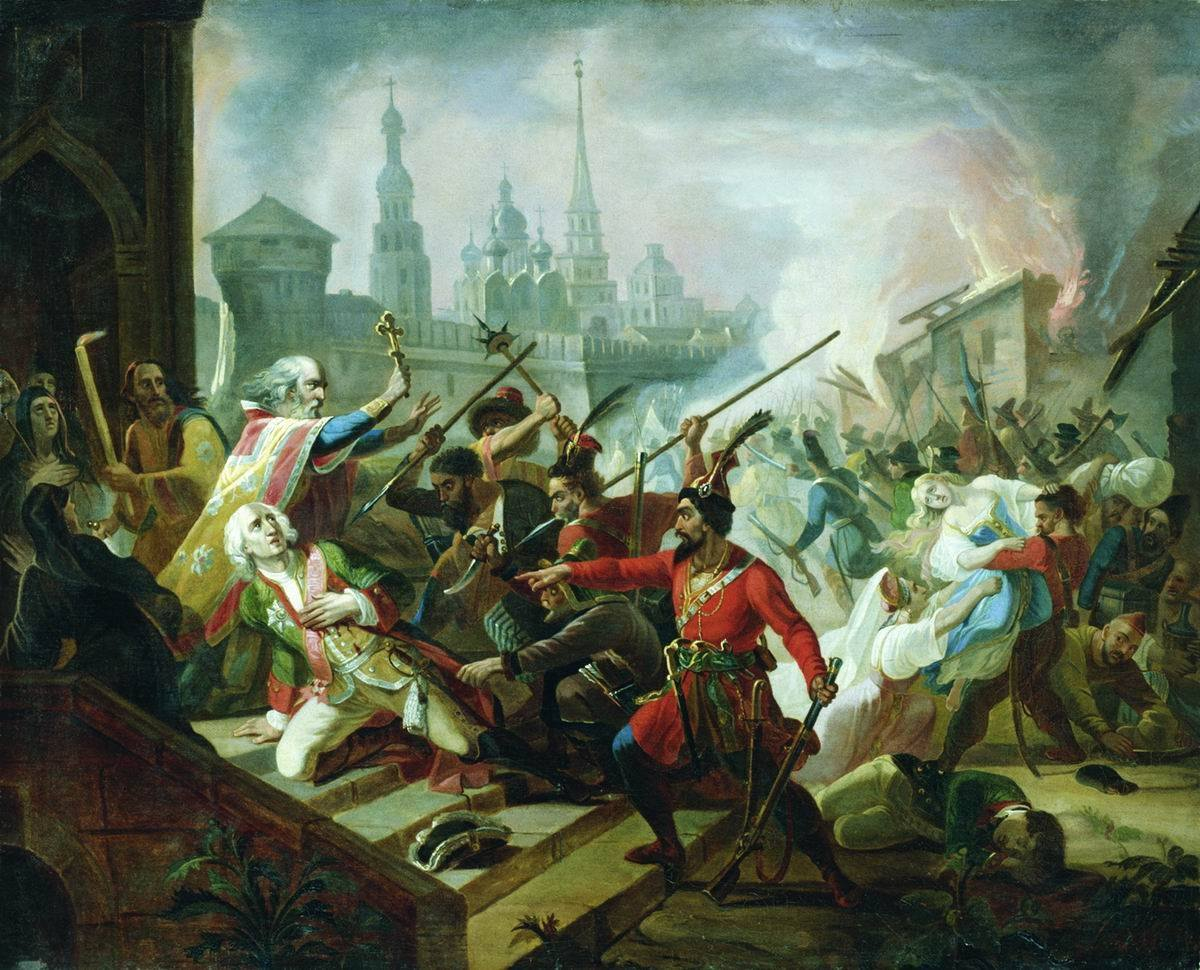
Assault of Kazan by Pugachev, 1847

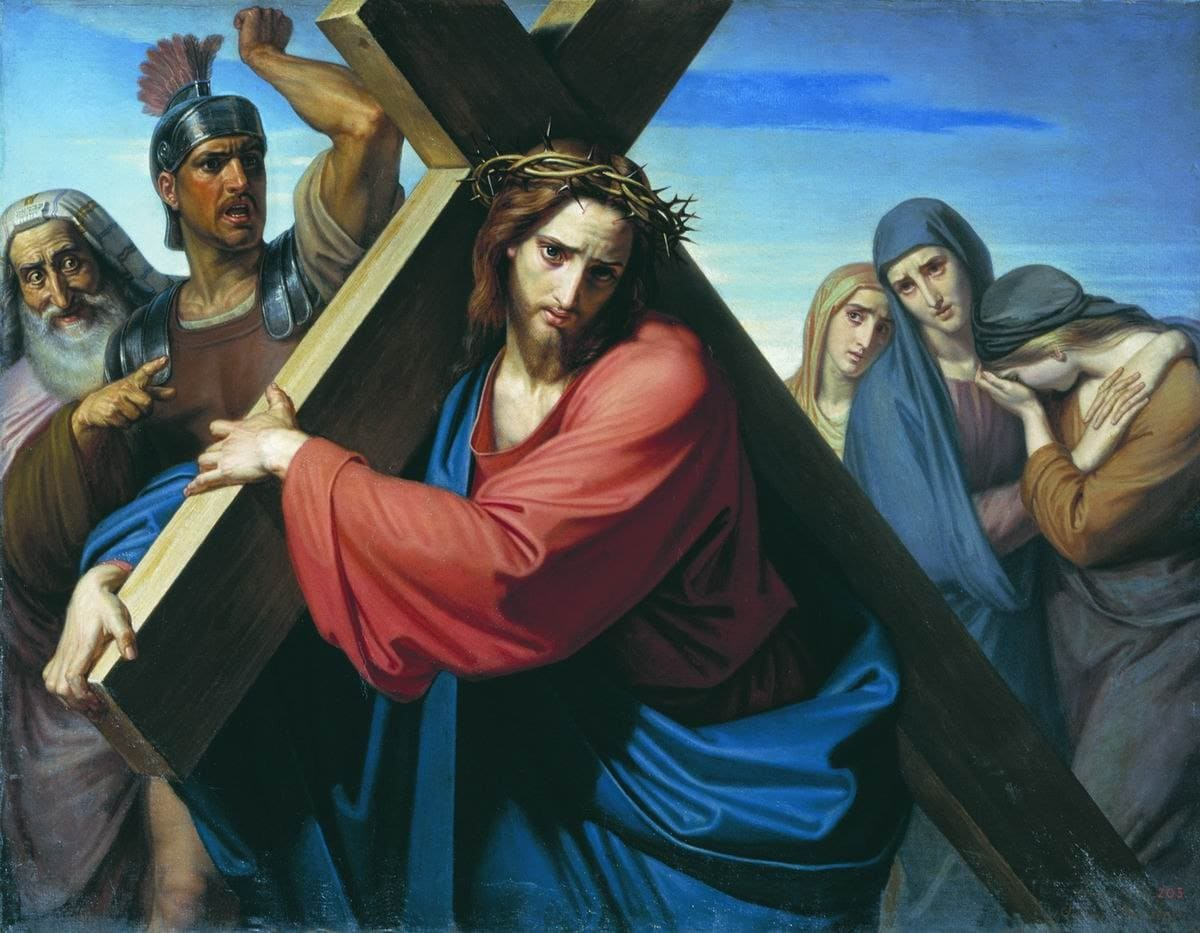
Christ Carrying the Cross
Portraits

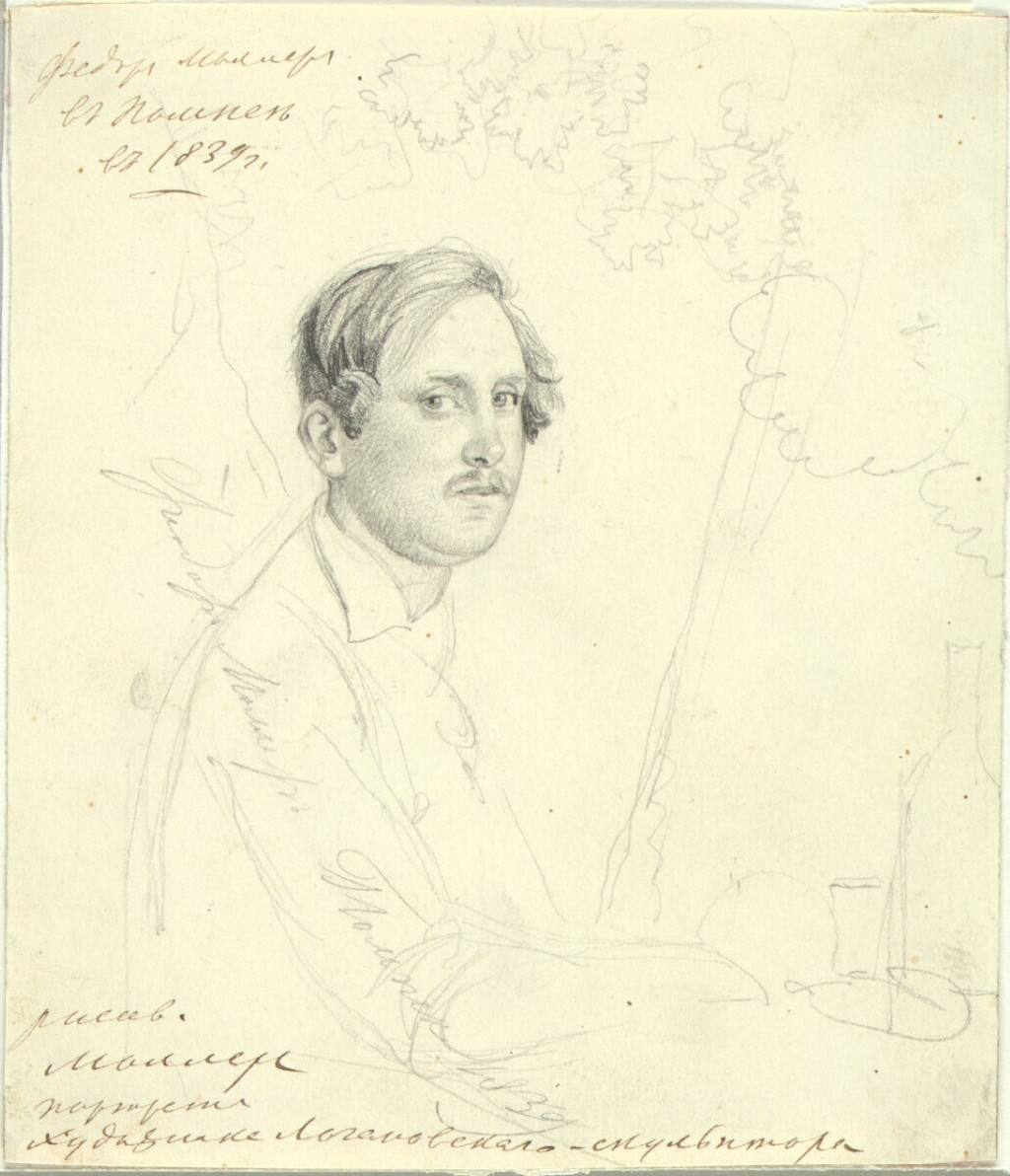
Alexander Loganovsky, 1839

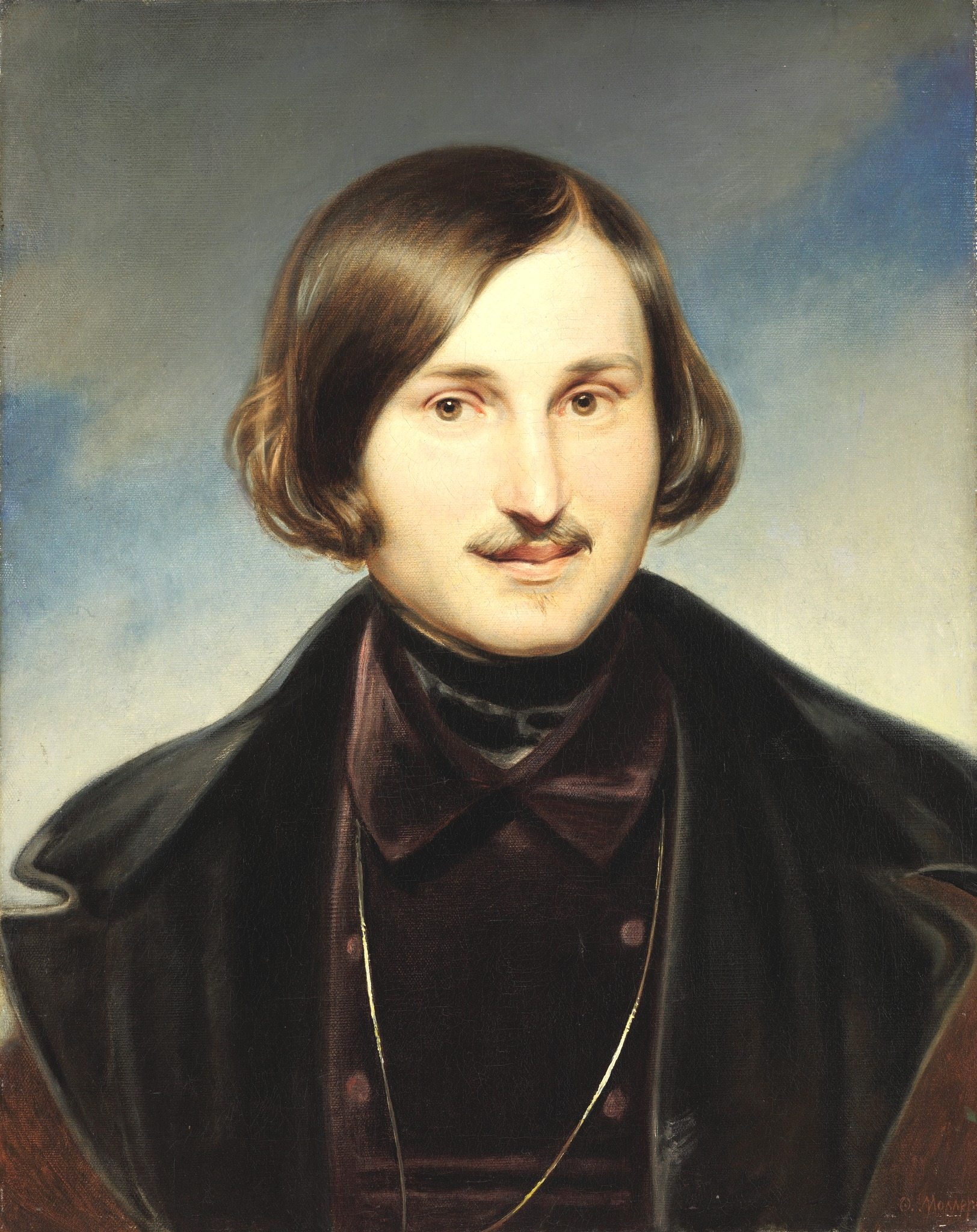
Nikolai Gogol, 1840

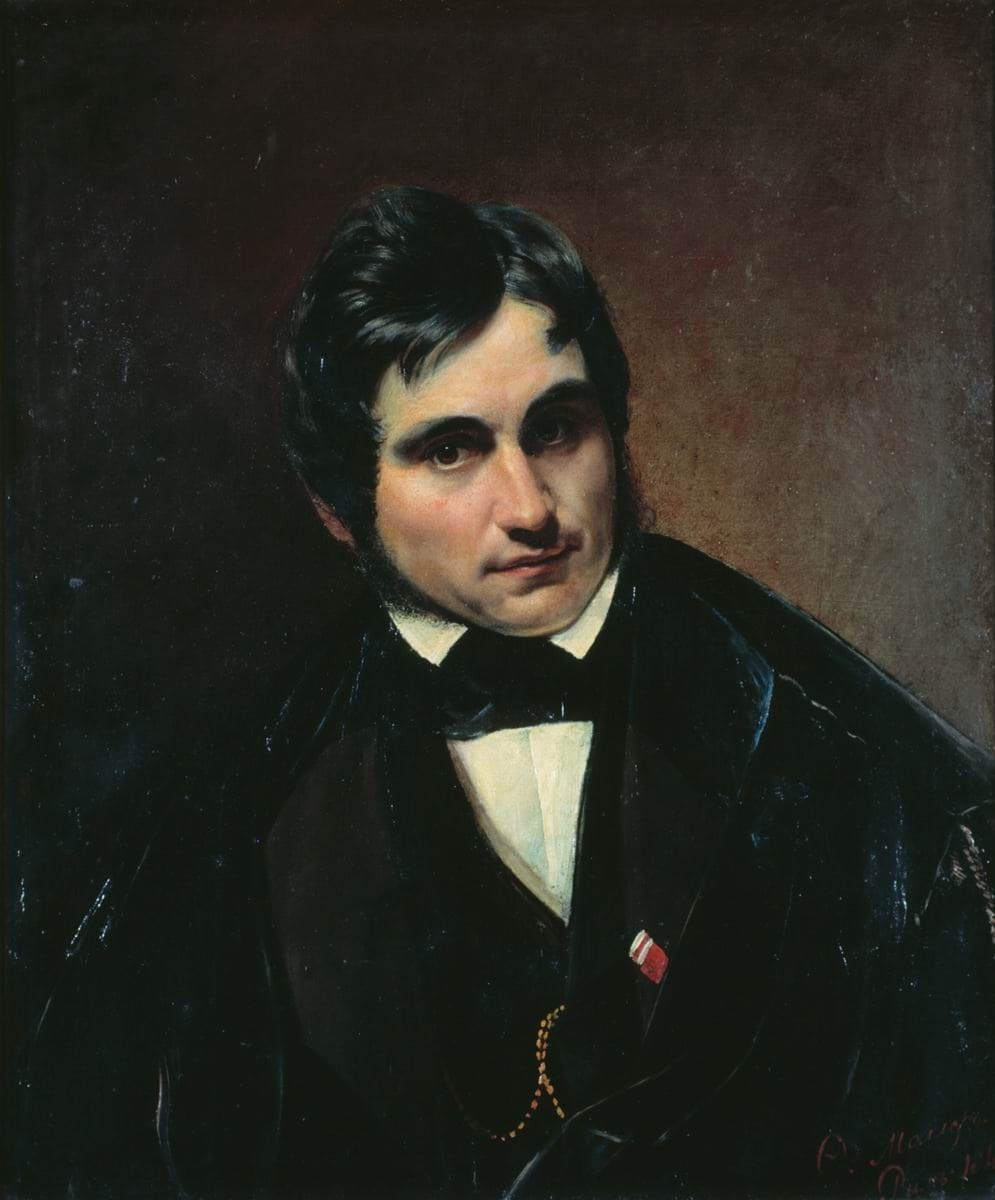
Fyodor Bruni, 1840

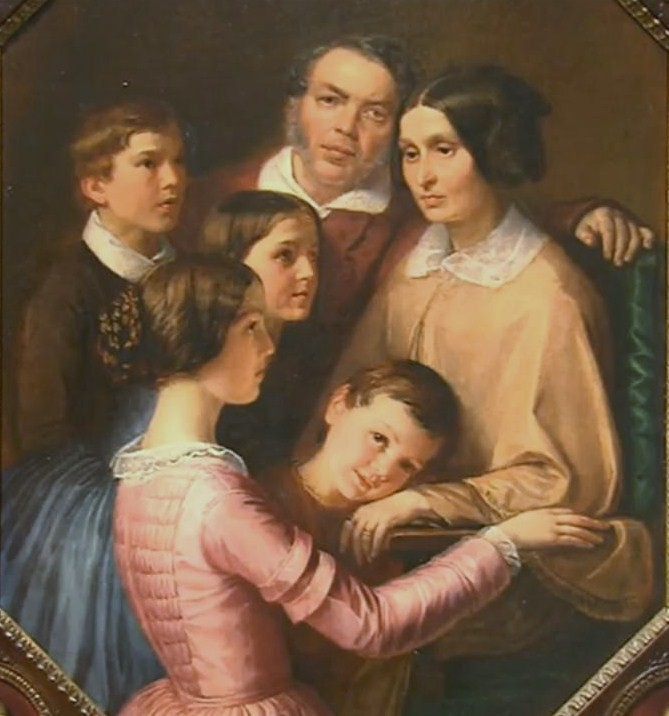
Ivan Kruglikov, Count Chernyshyov-Kruglikov, with His Family, 1847

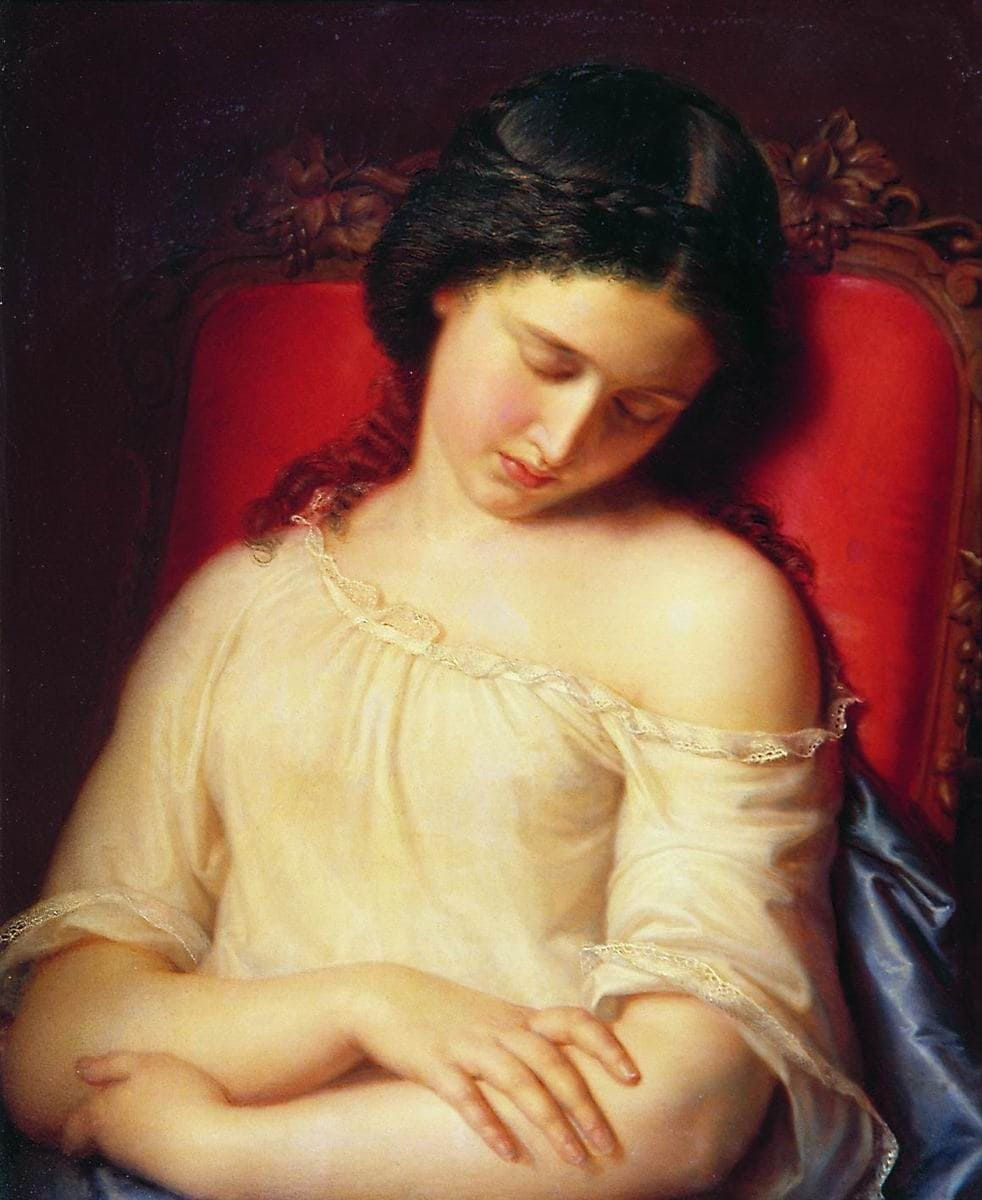
Sleeping Girl, 1850

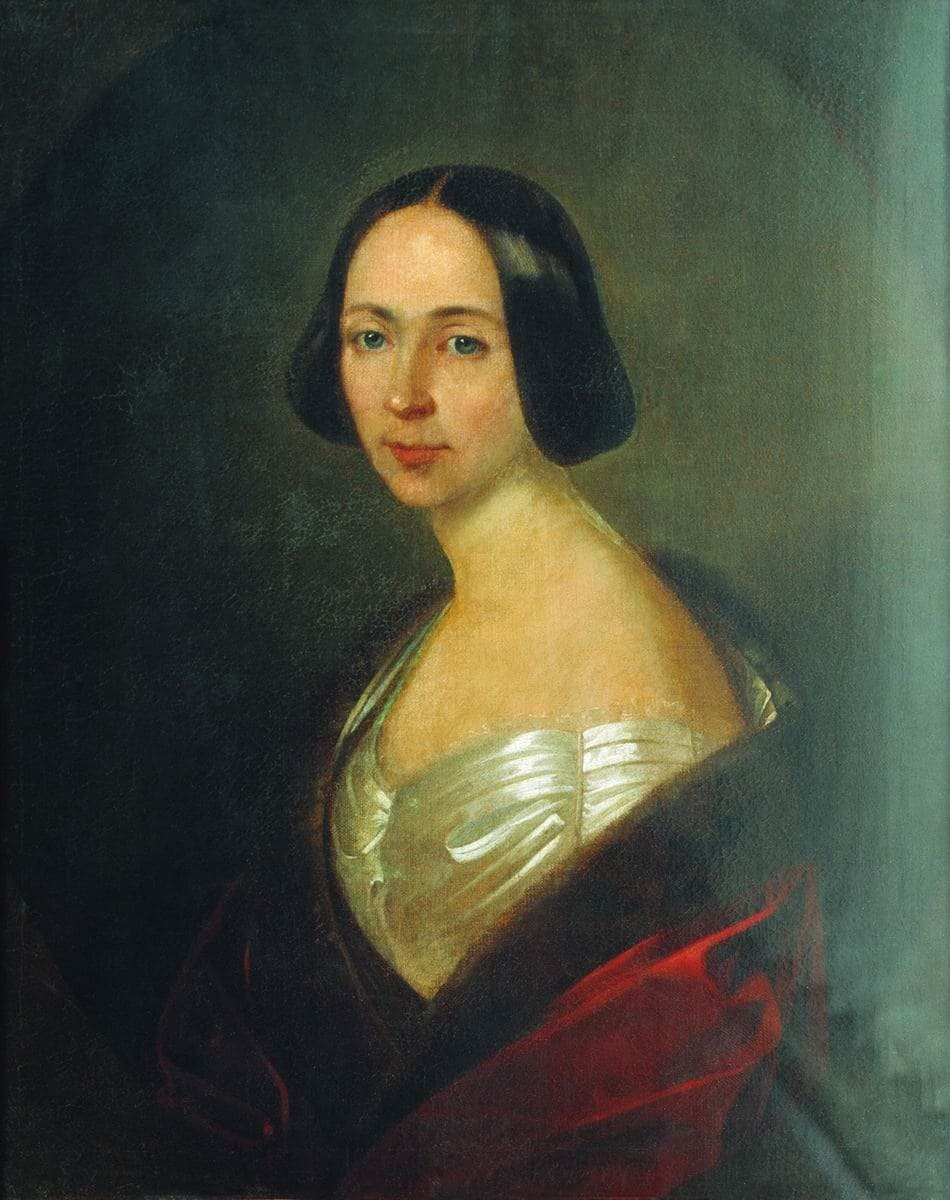
Princess Louise Golitsyna, 1850
