= Lazar Polyakov =

Russian-Jewish entrepreneur (1843–1914)

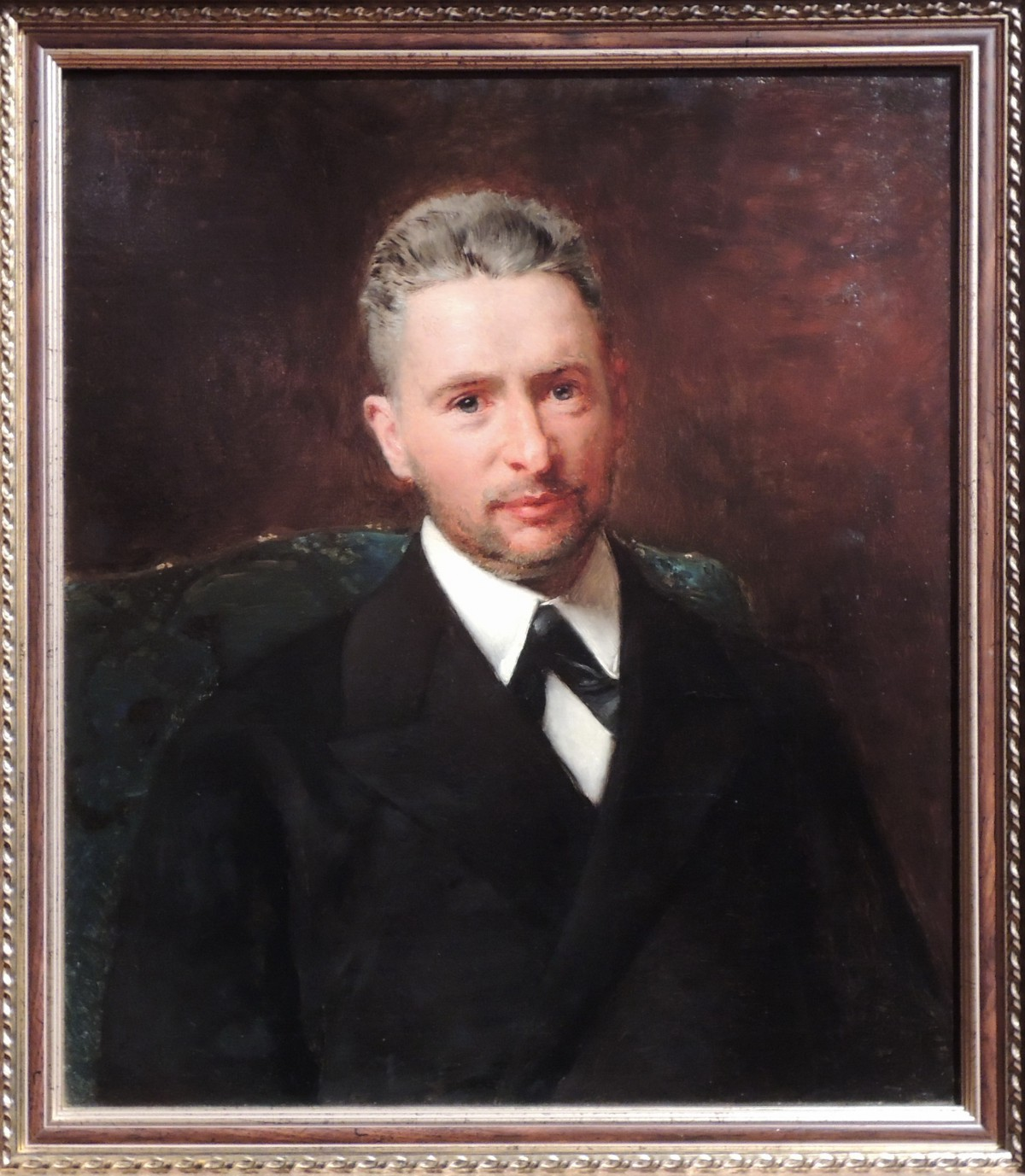
- Portrait of Polyakov by K. Makovskiy in 1882
- Born: Leyzer Solomonovich Polyakov; 1843; Dubrovno, Russian Empire
- Died: 1914 (aged 70–71)
- Occupations: Banker, speculator
- Years active: 1872–1909
- Relatives: Samuel Polyakov (brother)

Lazar Solomonovich Polyakov (Russian: Ла́зарь Соломо́нович Поляко́в; 1843–1914) was a Russian entrepreneur. He founded his first bank in 1872 and by the 1890s owned an influential financial group; he was informally named "Rothschild of Moscow". His business collapsed in the early 1900s and was completely disbanded by 1909.

== Biography ==
Lazar and his brothers, future railroad magnate Samuel Polyakov and banker Yakov Polyakov, were born into the family of a small trader in Dubrovno (now Belarus). His family was Jewish. Lazar's grandfather had moved from Poland in 1783. "Polyakov" is a Russianized version of "Polyak", which means Pole. Lazar remained in the shadow of his better-known brother and employer Samuel until 1872, when he founded L. S. Polyakov Bank in Moscow.

In the 1870s and 1880s, Polyakov founded five more commercial banks (in Moscow, Oryol, Saint Petersburg and Odessa) and two mortgage banks (Moscow, Yaroslavl). He remained the principal shareholder and manager of these banks until their collapse in the 1900s. The group also included insurance and trading companies. The assets of his top-level holding companies were valued at 40 million roubles, mostly in the stock of his own enterprises.

Polyakov created wealth through stock-exchange deals and trading in Southern Russian step wheat. His business rarely ventured into the textiles, metalworking, and real estate that were the fields of traditional Moscow bankers. However, the Jewish sources point at the rivalry between Polyakov and ethnic Russian bankers represented by the mayor of Moscow Nikolay Alekseyev. This competition allegedly influenced the deportation of Jews of 1891–1892.

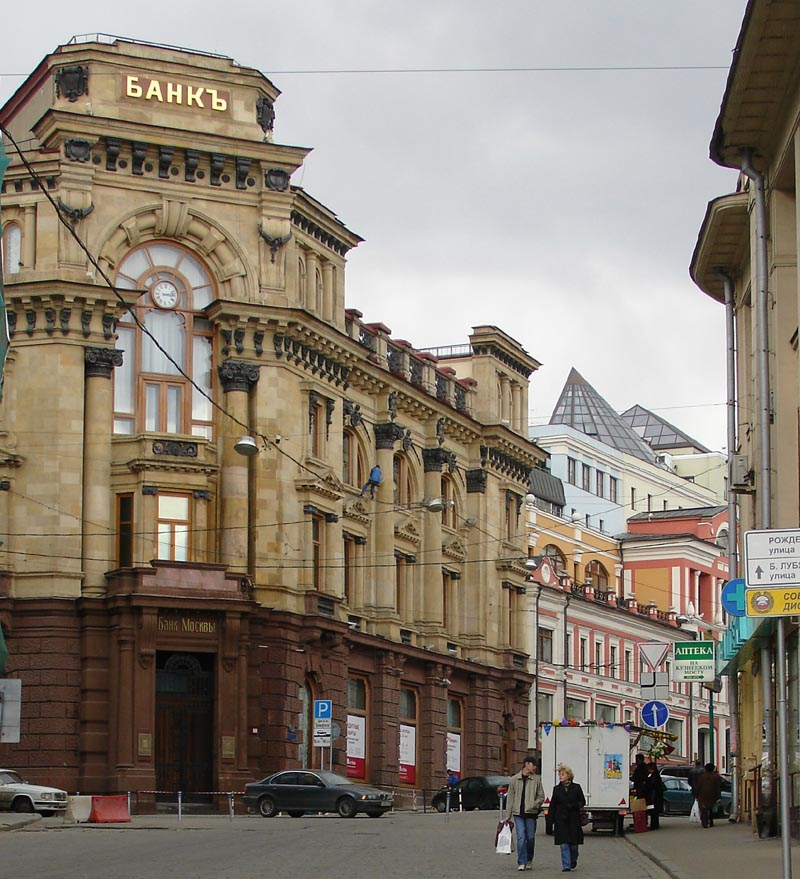
Polyakov's International Moscow Bank building in Kuznetsky Most street, erected in 1897–1898. Polyakov instructed the architect, Semyon Eybushitz, to recreate the San Spirito Bank in Rome.

Polyakov's continuing practice of relying on the inflated value of his own stock used as collateral contributed to his own downfall. It started with Yakov Polyakov's bank problems in 1898. Then, in 1901, Yakov's Peterburg-Azov Bank collapsed beyond recovery. The recession of the 1900s brought the stock prices down. Polyakov defaulted on his loans and his banks folded one by one. The Ministry of Finance, fearing a domino effect bank run, initially supported Polyakov's banks. However, as the crisis developed the banker himself became an obstacle to restructuring.

In 1909, the Ministry of Finance took over the last three surviving banks and consolidated them into a new United Bank (Russian: Соединённый Банк). The three banks declared 25 million roubles in assets of which 17.5 million were written off as bad debt. United Bank was chaired by an ethnic Russian appointed by the government, while Polyakov's son Alexander retained a seat on the board of directors.

In the end, Lazar's own finances were ruined to the extent that his own sons refused to take up his debt-ridden estate upon his death.

Lazar Polyakov remained the leader of the Jewish community in Moscow for 35 years; he was the main sponsor of the Moscow Choral Synagogue. Before its completion in 1906, Polyakov allowed the congregation to pray in his own house. Rebbe Mase said in the funeral eulogy, that "his name is retold in fairytales across the pale of settlement. Our poorer brethren, blessing themselves on their wedding days, say 'Let God make you equal to Polyakov'".
