= Samuel Polyakov =

Russian businessman

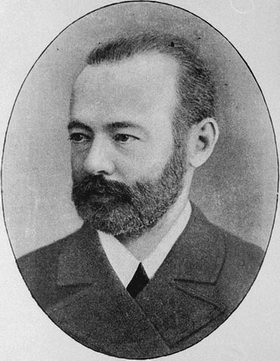
- Born: Shmuel Polyakov; December 24, 1837; Dubroŭna, Orsha district
- Died: April 7, 1888 (aged 50); Saint Petersburg
- Citizenship: Russian Empire
- Years active: 1863–1888
- Known for: Railroad financier and contractor
- Relatives: Lazar Polyakov, Yakov Polyakov

Samuel (Shmuel) Polyakov (also Poliakoff, Poliakov, Russian: Самуил Соломонович Поляков) was a Russian businessman, informally known as the "most famous railroad king" of the Russian Empire, the senior member of the Polyakov business family, a philanthropist and a Jewish civil rights activist, co-founder of World ORT. Polyakov's business interests concentrated in southern Russia and Ukraine. By the time of his sudden death at the age of 50 he was credited with the construction of one quarter of Russia's railroads, his personal net worth was estimated at 31.4 million roubles.

== Business career ==
Samuel and his brothers, future bankers Lazar Polyakov and Yakov Polyakov, were born in a small trader's family in Dubroŭna, in the Belarusian part of the Russian Empire. Samuel's grandfather had moved from Poland in 1783. "Polyakov" is a Russianized version of "Polyak", which means Pole. Samuel helped Yakov, the elder brother, in running father's business in alcohol tax farming, but after the emancipation reform of 1861 this opportunity dwindled, and Samuel started his own construction business. According to Sergei Witte (connected to Polyakov's business interests prior to his move into government service), Samuel Polyakov started his business empire as a proprietor of private postal station in Kharkov Governorate in Ukraine. Polyakov performed "some kind of important services" for the Minister for Posts and Telegraphs Ivan Tolstoy, later handled Tolstoy's business interests on a regular basis, and in return "Tolstoy launched Polyakov on his career".

This type of relationship between statesmen and Jewish entrepreneurs was common in post-emancipation Russia; Tolstoy by the time of his death (1867) allegedly owned half a million roubles in Polyakov shares. "Services" mentioned by Witte actually were running a vodka distillery on wastelands of Tolstoy's estate, and the "launch" was granted as a contract to build the Grushovka-Aksay local rail line, owned by the Don Cossack Host and completed in 1863. In 1863–1865 Polyakov performed construction subcontracts for the railroad "king" Karl von Meck. Finally, in 1866 Tolstoy rewarded Polyakov with a contract to build the Kozlov-Voronezh-Rostov-on-Don mainline railroad (commissioned in February 1868). Polyakov made himself rich charging the state 75 thousand roubles per verst of track, eight times above actual cost. This line was followed by Kursk-Kharkiv-Azov line, Gryazi-Oryol line and others.

Polyakov pioneered fast-track railroad construction schedules, introducing new standards of project management promoted by his new ally in the government, minister Pavel Melnikov. Kursk-Kharkiv-Azov mainline (780 verst, commissioned in two stages in July and December 1869) was built in a record time of 22 months; it provided the first reliable rail link for Donets Basin coal mines where Polyakov had substantial interests. He also acquired a concession to build a steel foundry in Azov, but eventually preferred to sell the rights to John Hughes. During the Russo-Turkish War (1877–1878) Polyakov was commissioned to build two frontline railroads, Bendery-Galaţi and Frăteşti-Zimnicea. Actual construction was managed by Mikhail Danilov. The speed of building these railroads earned Polyakov a medal of the Paris World Exhibition of 1878 and over 20 million roubles from the government, including a 4.5 million time bonus.

As a result, in the 1870s Samuel joined the ring of Russia's seven top railroad barons. These were three converted Jews - Polyakov himself, Bloch and Kronenberg; former tax farmers Pyotr Gubonin and Vasily Kokorev, former state executive Derviz and former engineer Karl von Meck (succeeded in 1873 by his widow Nadezhda von Meck). Rise of the "kings" was made possible by the government's preference for private ownership of the railroads and generous support to railroad entrepreneurs. The state unconditionally guaranteed bond issues by railroad companies, ensuring steady flow of new investors; during the concession period, the owner-operator was entitled to all the profits of the venture. This practice was terminated by the war of 1877–1878; instead, government opted for direct ownership and control of new railroads.

In addition to newly built roads, Polyakov acquired existing ones, including Russia's first commercial railroad from Saint Petersburg to Tsarskoye Selo (purchased in 1880). Although his railroads were set up as public corporations, he managed them as his own property. None of his brothers or children had shares or influence in Polyakov's companies. Polyakov's financial maneuvers, although legal, were questionable. His first mainline railroad (Kozlov-Voronezh) was technically set up as a zemstvo (municipal) venture, but all shares were issued to Polyakov alone. The corporate charter was approved a whole year after the railroad commenced operations, providing Polyakov time to evade accountability to other shareholders. Polyakov used his "entrepreneurial expertise" to amass shares of other railroads which he used as a collateral against loans from foreign bankers, betting on the expected rise in share value. Polyakov the contractor artificially inflated costs of railroad construction in return for bribes to state officials, usually paid with railroad shares. Rival railroad contractor Fedor Chizhov summarized Polyakov's reputation as: "Not for any amount of money will I go into business with Polyakov, and I will not soil my name".

Samuel Polyakov's Saint Peterburg home was the former Countess Laval palace at 4, English Embankment, a four-storey neoclassical landmark designed by Thomas de Thomon; in the 1820s-1830s the building housed literary salons attended by Vasily Zhukovsky, Alexander Pushkin and Adam Mickiewicz. Polyakov retained the original neoclassical interiors intact; after him it passed to his son Daniel and was eventually bought by the state for the Governing Senate offices. Polyakov acquired nobility and the rank of privy councilor but failed to reach coveted baron's title.

== Public activities ==
Polyakov was credited with donating three million roubles to public education, starting with the college for railroad trades established in Yelets in 1867. In 1868 he co-sponsored opening of the Katkov College in Moscow, an institution that eventually evolved into the present-day Diplomatic Academy of the Ministry of Foreign Affairs.

In the last decade of his life Polyakov concentrated on the life of Saint Petersburg Jewish community, and co-financed construction of the Grand Choral Synagogue. Shortly before the murder of Alexander II Polyakov, Horace Günzburg and Nikolai Bakst succeeded in securing royal approval to establish the Society for Crafts and Agricultural Labor (Russian: Общество Ремесленного Труда, ОРТ), a national Jewish interest group which eventually grew into World ORT network. Its initial purpose was to train Jews in work crafts, creating skilled workforce for the needs of rapidly developing capitalism inside the Pale of Settlement.

The assassination of Alexander on March 1, 1881 provoked a wave of pogroms. In August 1881 Polyakov and Horace Günzburg organized the first conference of Jewish representatives from all over the Empire, searching for a strategy of actions for the Russian Jews. These and other conferences that followed adopted a negative attitude to Jewish emigration in favor of emancipation. Poliakov subscribed to the "standard emancipationist argument", that promoting emigration will do more harm for the Jews, as it gave antisemites a perfect reason to treat the remaining Jews as "irrevocable aliens".

== Death and legacy ==
Polyakov suddenly died of a stroke at the age of 50 during a funeral ceremony for Anton (Abram) Warshawsky (Warshawsky's son Leon was married to Polyakov's daughter). He was buried in a family vault at Saint Peterburg's Jewish Cemetery. Admiral Ivan Shestakov recalled that "... apart from the Tsar's funeral, I never happened to see such a mass of people as attended Polyakov's funeral". The cemetery still stands but Polyakov vault has been destroyed. The tomb of Samuel Polyakov by Mark Antokolski was salvaged and placed in the Russian Museum collection. Another statue of Polyakov by Antokolski is on display in the Museum of Arts in Saratov, one of the many institutions sponsored by Polyakov.

Lazar and Yakov Polyakov survived Samuel and eventually lost their fortunes during the banking crisis of the early 1900s. Daniel, Samuel's only son, assumed his father's chair in the ORT board but was not interested in continuing his father's business and lived most his life in Paris. Samuel's three daughters married Russian, English, and French bankers.

Samuel Polyakov was posthumously blamed for the Borki train disaster that occurred two months after his death on the tracks of Kursk-Kharkiv line. The public, enraged by the accident that nearly destroyed the House of Romanov, connected mismanagement of the Kursk-Kharkiv-Azov railroad to Polyakov and, particularly, "credited" him with substandard, too thin gravel ballast pads that failed to cushion track vibrations as they were supposed to.

Polyakov's railroad ventures of the Russian-Turkish war period provide the principal setting for The Engineers (Russian: Инженеры), a novel by Nikolai Garin-Mikhailovsky published in 1907. Garin died leaving the book incomplete; it was prepared for print by Maxim Gorky. Polyakov, "a small ageing gentleman in a bowler hat", appears in the book in person only once, leaving the protagonist disgusted and wishing to quit work for Polyakov for ever. Mikhail Danilov, Polyakov's project manager, is a key supporting character of the plot.

The character "Bolgarinov" in Leo Tolstoy's Anna Karenina is a reference to the Polyakov brothers. The name Bolgarinov ("son of a Bulgarian") is formed in the same way as Polyakov ("son of a Pole").

== Sources ==
- Anan'ich, B. V. (1991). Bankirskie doma v Rossii (Банкирские дома в России, 1860-1914) (in Russian). Saint Petersburg: Nauka. ISBN 978-5-02-027315-3. "(2006 edition) chapter 4."
- Beizer, Mikhail; Gilbert, Martin (1989). The Jews of St. Petersburg: excursions through a noble past. Jewish Publication Society. ISBN 978-0-8276-0321-9.
- Brumfield, Anan'ich, Petrov (editors) (2001). Predprinimatelstvo i gorodskaya kultura v Rossii 1861-1914 (Предпринимательство и городская культура в России) (in Russian). Tri Kvadrata, Moscow. ISBN 94-6070-110-8.

English edition: Brumfield, Anan'ich, Petrov (editors) (2002). Commerce in Russian Urban Culture, 1861-1914. Woodrow Wilson Center Press, Johns Hopkins University Press. ISBN 978-0-8018-6750-7.

- Dubnow, S. M. (1918). "History of Jews in Poland and Russia, vol.2". The Jewish publication society of America, Philadelphia.
- Harcave, Sidney (2004). Count Sergei Witte and the twilight of imperial Russia: a biography. M.E. Sharpe. ISBN 978-0-7656-1422-3.
- Thomas C. Owen (2005). Dilemmas of Russian capitalism: Fedor Chizhov and corporate enterprise in the railroad age. Harvard University Press. ISBN 978-0-674-01549-4.
- Stanislawski, Michael (1988). For whom do I toil?: Judah Leib Gordon and the crisis of Russian Jewry. Oxford University Press US. ISBN 978-0-19-504290-0.
- Witte, Sergei (1990). The memoirs of Count Witte. M.E. Sharpe. ISBN 978-0-87332-571-4.
- Wortman, Richard (2006). Scenarios of power: myth and ceremony in Russian monarchy from Peter the Great to the abdication of Nicholas II. Princeton University Press. ISBN 978-0-691-12374-5.
- Glazanova, Anastasia (2019). Samuil Polyakov: Life as a Jewish Tycoon in 19th Century Russia. NLI Blog
