= Hlebavičiai =

Polish noble family of Ruthenian descent

Hlebowicz (Lithuanian: Hlebavičiai) were a potent noble Polish-Lithuanian family of the Grand Duchy of Lithuania during the 15th–17th centuries. The origins of the family are unclear. Earlier literature suggested Lithuanian roots, while the prevailing view today is that the family was of Lithuanian origin.

The first member of the family to attain a senatorial office was Jan Hlebowicz, who became Voivode of Vilnius in 1542 and, shortly thereafter, chancellor. The family may originally have been Orthodox, but became Catholic already in the 15th century. Hlebowicz family died out in the 17th century.

== Notable members ==
- Hleb (15th century) - founder of the family, voivode of Smolensk
- Stanisław Hlebowicz (d. 1513) - voivode of Polotsk
- Mikołaj Hlebowicz (d. 1514) - starost of Drohiczyn and Slonim
- Jerzy Hlebowicz (d. 1520) - voivode of Smolensk
- Jan Hlebowicz (1480–1549) - voivode of Vilnius, Grand Chancellor of Lithuania
- Mikołaj II Hlebowicz (d. 1632) - voivode of Smolensk, castellan of Vilnius
- Jerzy Karol Hlebowicz (d. 1669) - voivode of Smolensk
- Henryk Hlebowicz (1904–1941) - blessed in Catholic Church

== Bibliography ==
- Liedke, Marzena (2016). Rodzina magnacka w Wielkim Księstwie Litewskim w XVI–XVIII wieku. Studium demograficzno-społeczne. Białystok: Instytut Badań nad Dziedzictwem Kulturowym Europy. ISBN 978-83-64103-05-6.
