= Mikołaj Hlebowicz =

Mikołaj II Hlebowicz (died 1632) was a Polish–Lithuanian political figure known for being castellan of Vilnius, voivode of Smolensk, marshal of the Lithuanian Tribunal and podstoli of Lithuania.

Hlebowicz was the son of Jan Hlebowicz, voivode of Trakai. He took part in the Polish–Swedish wars, fighting at Riga and at Kircholm in 1605, and later fought in the Polish–Muscovite War (1605–1618).

Together with his wife Hlebowicz converted from Calvinism to Roman Catholicism, sponsoring a monastery in Dubrowna. Hlebowicz was married to Princess Marcybella Anna Korecka and was the father of Jan Samuel Hlebowicz and Jerzy Karol Hlebowicz.
