= Mark Antokolsky =

Russian sculptor (1840–1902)

- Марк Антокольский
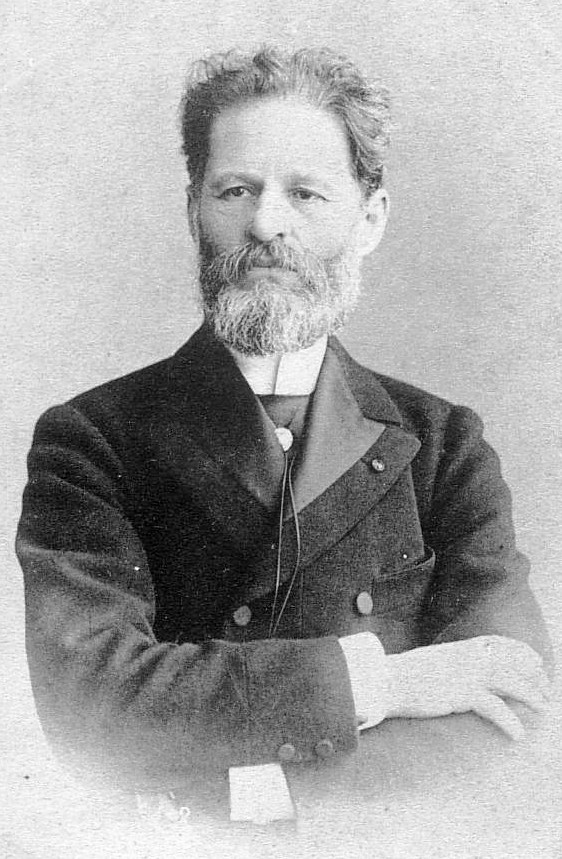
- Born: 21 October 1843; Vilna, Vilna Governorate, Russian Empire
- Died: 9 July 1902 (aged 58); Bad Homburg vor der Höhe, German Empire
- Resting place: Jewish Cemetery, Saint Petersburg
- Education: Nikolai Pimenov; Imperial Academy of Arts
- Known for: Sculpture
- Elected: Member Academy of Arts (1871); Professor by rank (1880); Full Member Academy of Arts (1893)

Mark Matveyevich Antokolsky (Russian: Марк Матвеевич Антокольский; 21 October 1843 – 9 July 1902) was a Russian sculptor of Lithuanian–Jewish descent.

== Biography ==
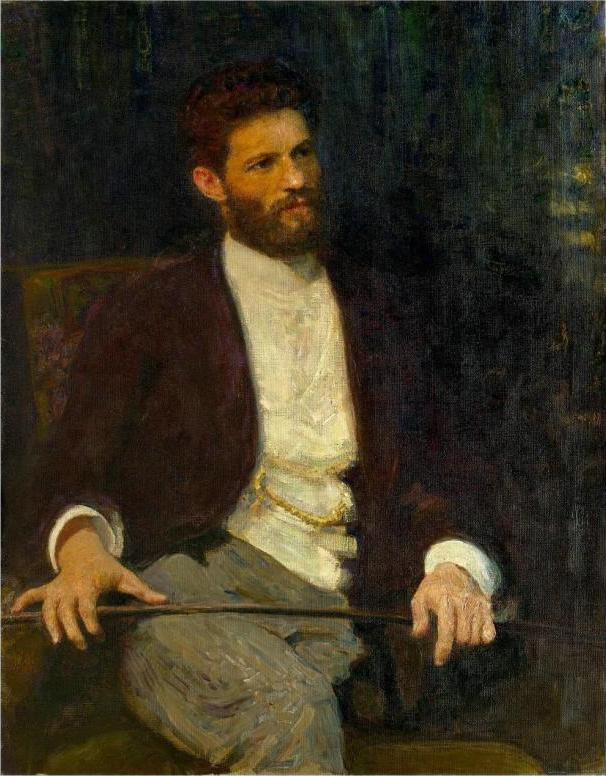
Portrait of Antokolsky by Ilya Repin, 1914

=== Early life ===
Mordukh Matysovich Antokolsky was born in Vilnius (Antokol city district), Lithuania (at the time part of the Russian Empire). He was born into a Jewish family of eight children. He studied in the Imperial Academy of Arts (1862–68) at St. Petersburg. He first began with Jewish themes, statues: "Jewish Tailor", "Nathan the Wise", "Inquisition's Attack against Jews", "The Talmudic Debate".

=== Later life and career ===
From 1868 to 1870, Mark Antokolsky lived in Berlin. His statue of Ivan the Terrible (1870) was purchased for the Hermitage by Emperor Alexander II of Russia. The latter approved his work and awarded the sculptor the title of Academic. Antokolsky believed that sculpture was a social and humane ideal. In order to improve his failing health, he moved to the Italian resorts in 1871 and settled in Paris six years later.

Every year Antokolsky would come back to his native town of Vilnius during his summer holidays. Namely here he created his first significant work, high relief "A Jewish Tailor", during his summer holidays of 1864.

The work of the young sculptor provoked debate in the Academy in Petersburg. On 28 October 1864, the Council of the Academy decided to award Antokolski with the Small Silver Medal for the "Tailor" by the majority of votes.

While in Vilnius the following year, Antokolski created another high relief - "A Stingy Man," which is sometimes referred to as "A Stingy Jew Counting his Coins". The artist was born into a poor family and saw how his father's financial situation improved. The sculpture might have reflected Antokolski's feelings towards his native town of Vilnius, and firstly to his father. This work as well as the first sculpture was positively evaluated by Vladimir Stasov who saw "the features of the simple truth, the things that, previously, nobody dared to think about in sculpture" in the works of the artist. In 1865, the high relief "Stingy Man" was awarded the Grand Silver Medal of the Academy. In later years the sculptor continued working on Jewish themes, which developed into complex, yet unfinished compositions: "Talmud Dispute" (1866–1868) and "Inquisition Attacks the Jews" (1868–1869). The "Inquisition" was M. Antokolski's last work on the Jewish topic in his student years.

According to the review of the Art Academy, Antokolsky was granted personal name of honorary citizen "for wonderful knowledge of art" on 7 April 1870. This fact was also entered into an archival record. Moreover, an inscription remained that Morduchas was excluded from the revision register of Antakalnis Jewish community as a person awarded the name of an honorary citizen.

In 1871 Antokolsky started his first "Russian" sculpture, "Ivan the Terrible", which made an enormous impression on all valuators and connoisseurs of art. When Emperor Alexander II saw the sculpture he asked to make its bronze copy and allocated the sculptor advance payment of 4,000 roubles. Pavel Tretyakov ordered a marble copy for his gallery. The funds received enabled the artist to resolve his personal problems. In 1871 (in Vilnius) Antokolski met Jelena (Gene), daughter of a rich Vilnius merchant Judelis Giršovičius Apatovas. The two married on 6 September 1872.

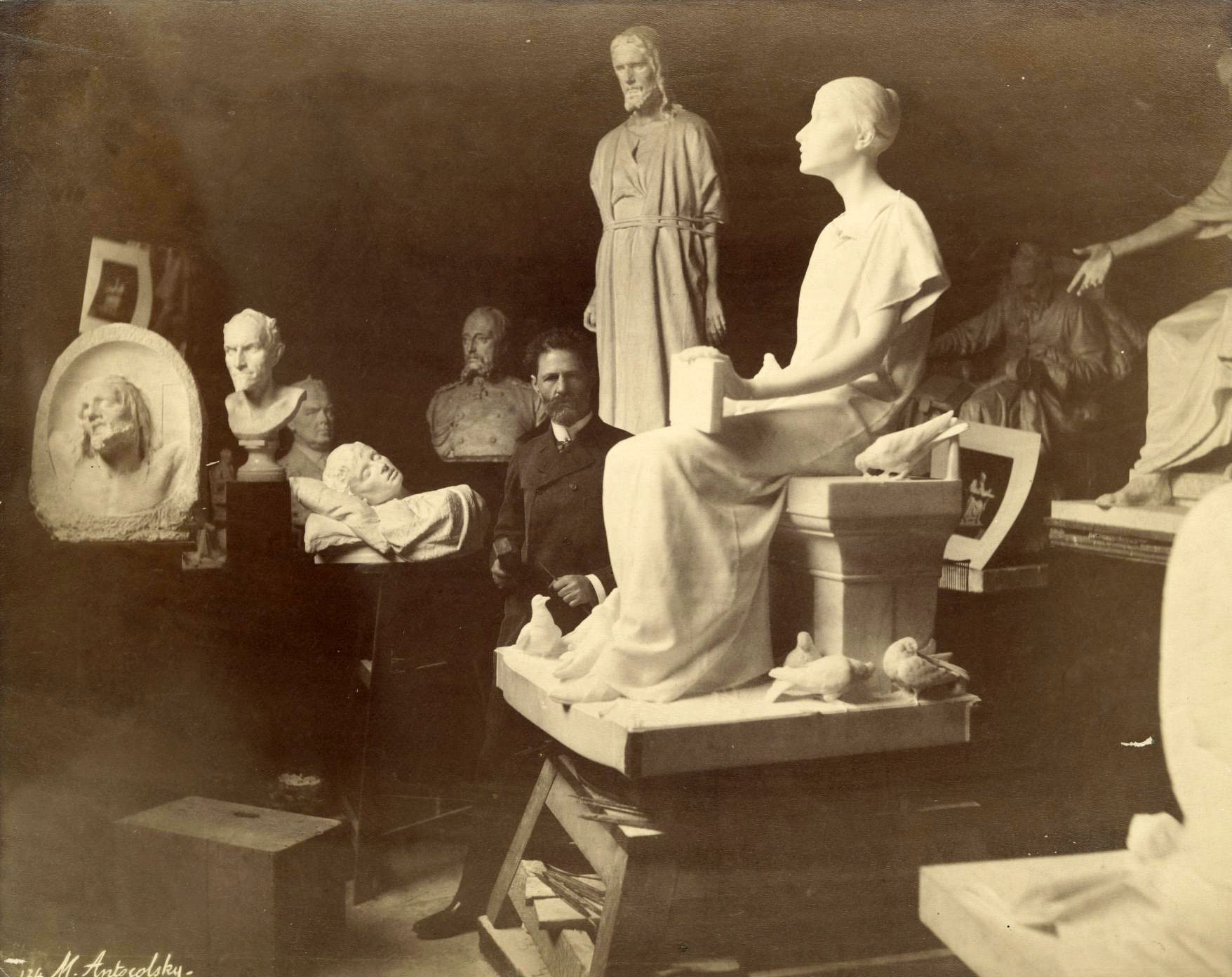
Mark Antokolski in his Paris studio.

Antokolsky used 4,000 rubles for the "Ivan the Terrible" to buy half of a big house in Vilnius, the other part of which had previously belonged to his wife. In 1876, upon his regular visits to Vilnius, Antokolsky rebuilt the house. After 1876, Antokolsky was a rare visitor to his native town due to illnesses, work, and exhibitions in Paris and Italy, which took almost all of his time. However, the artist did not break his links with Jewish life. Concern over his nation urged Antokolsky to return to his work "Inquisition Attacks the Jews", started 30 years before in Vilnius.

In Rome, Antokolsky completed the statue of Peter the Great for Peterhof Palace in 1872, with its copies for Taganrog and Arkhangelsk. In 1878 Antokolski exhibited most of his works at the Paris Universal exposition, and received the Grand Prize. In 1880, the personal exhibition of the artist was held in Saint Petersburg, and he was given the rank of professor. Antokolsky left for Paris the same year, and stayed in the French capital until the end of his life, apart from periods on Lake Maggiore, in northern Italy. He realised here the following works: "Spinoza" (1881), "Mephistopheles" (1884), "Yaroslav the Wise" (1889), "Nestor the Chronicler" (1889) and "Yermak Timofeevich" (1891). Several of his small-size sculptures are in the European Art collection of the Israel Museum, Jerusalem.

=== Death ===
He had also planned a monument to Catherine II in Vilnius. However, with the chronic stomach disease getting more severe, the artist suddenly died on 9 July (27 June according to the old calendar) in Frankfurt (Germany). The last work was completed by I. Ginzburg after the sculptor's death. The monument has not survived.

Antokolski was buried in St. Petersburg. The train with a special carriage went via Vilnius. Antokolski was buried on the 18th (6th according to the old calendar) of July 1902 in the Jewish part of Preobrazhenskoye Cemetery in St. Petersburg. His grave and tombstone can still be found there, not far from the entrance gate, but were not well maintained and cared for at least up to the 1990s.

== Gallery ==
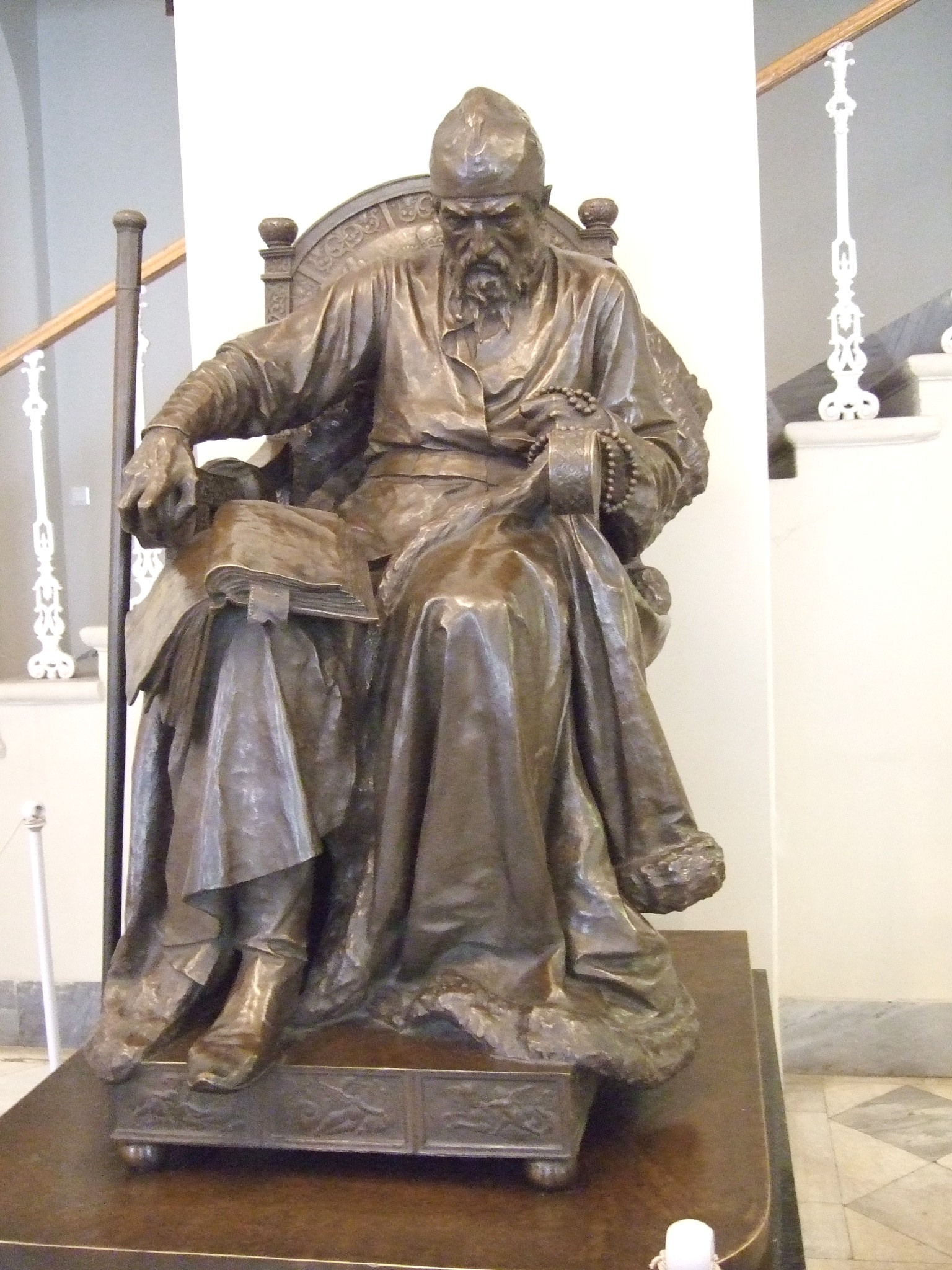
Ivan the Terrible, 1871

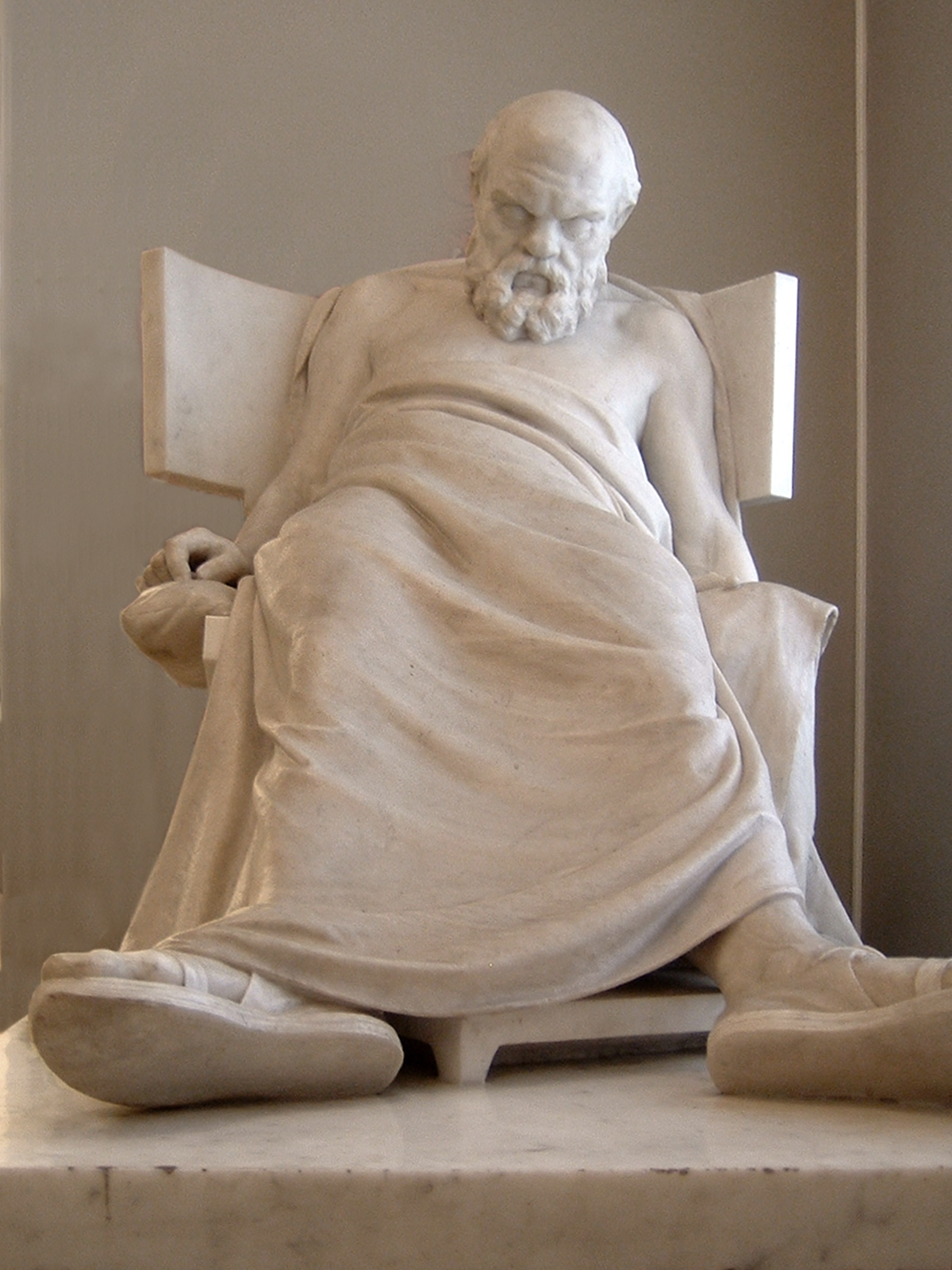
Death of Socrates, 1875

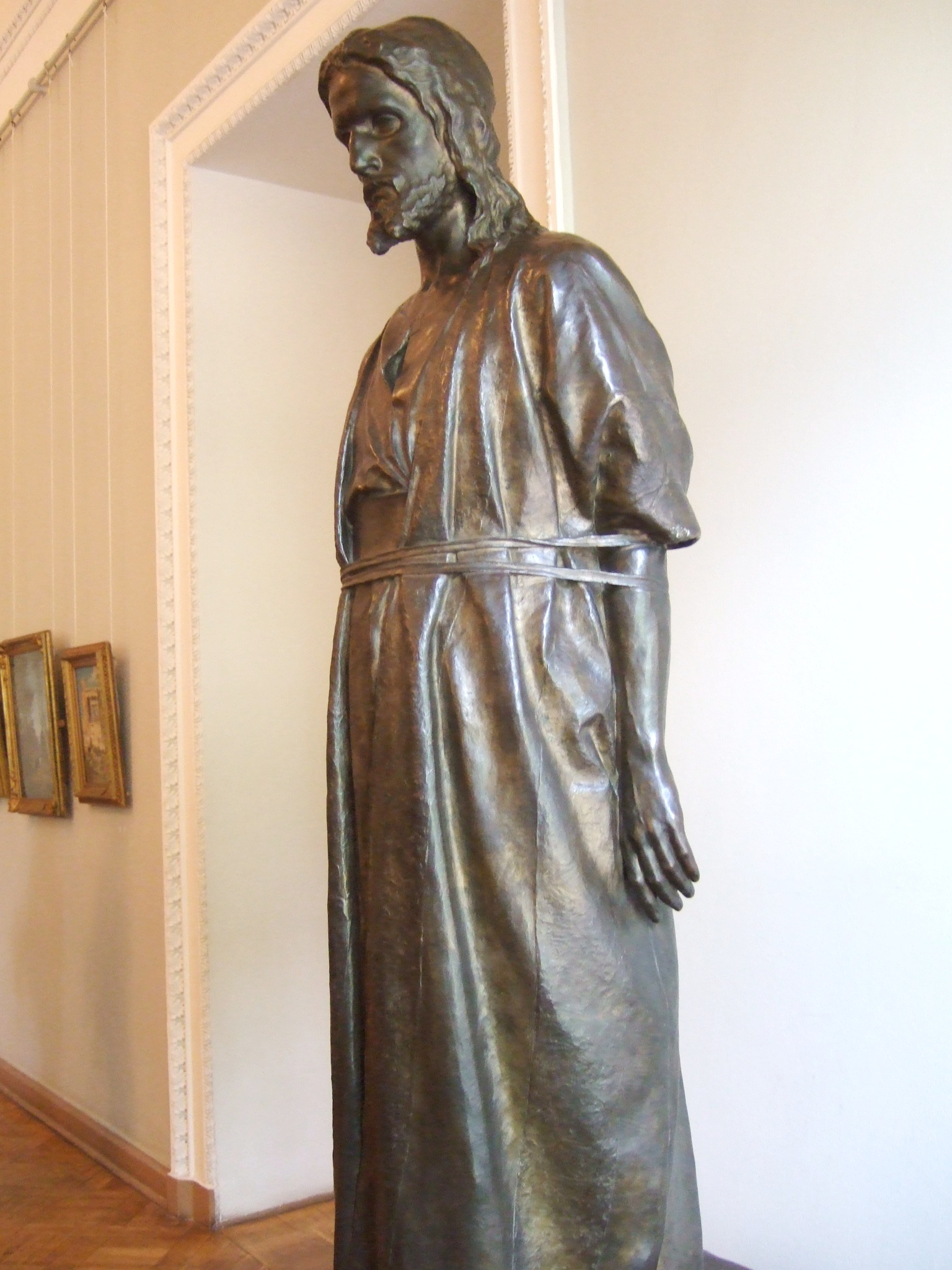
Christ before the people, 1878

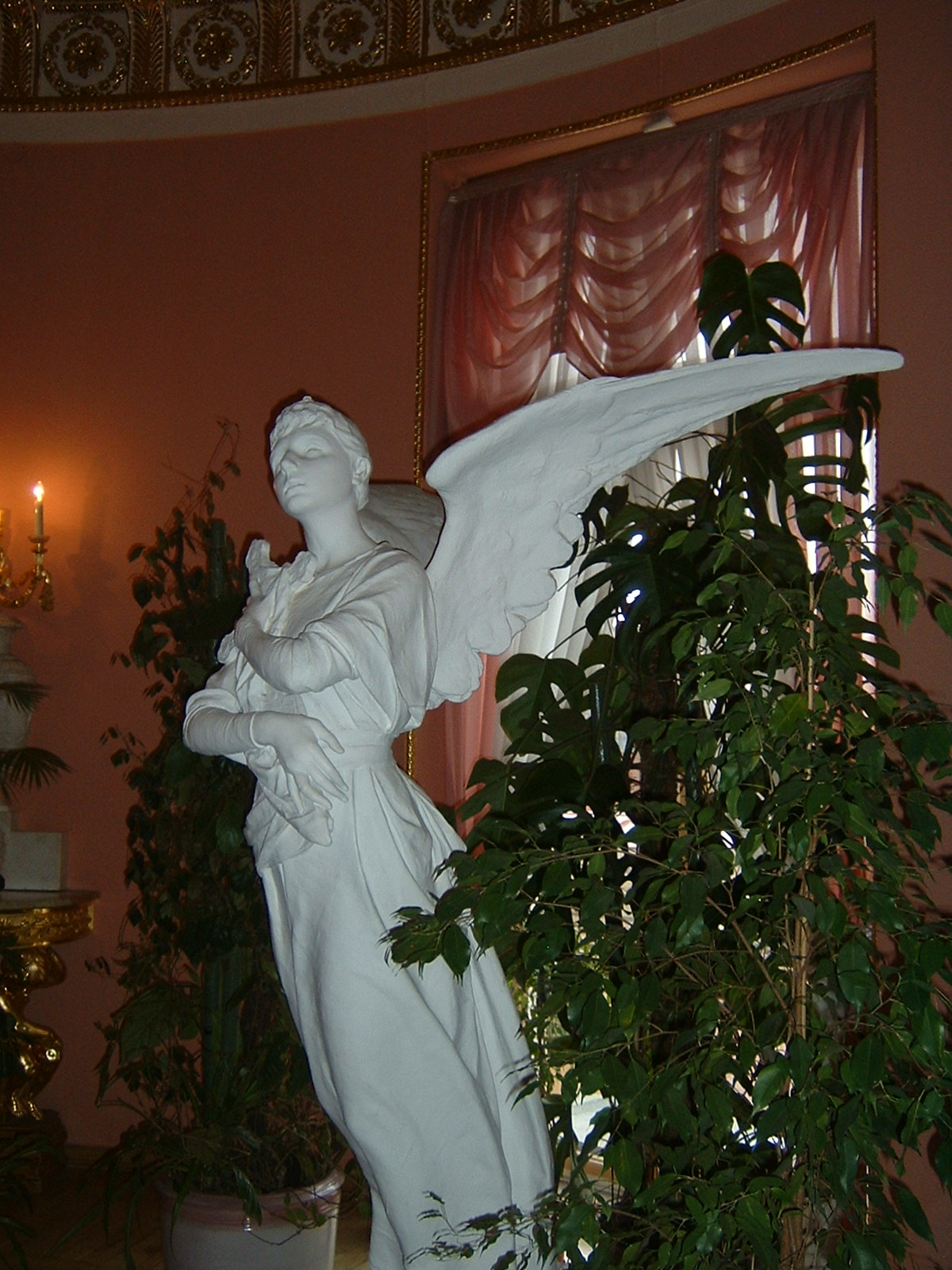
Angel

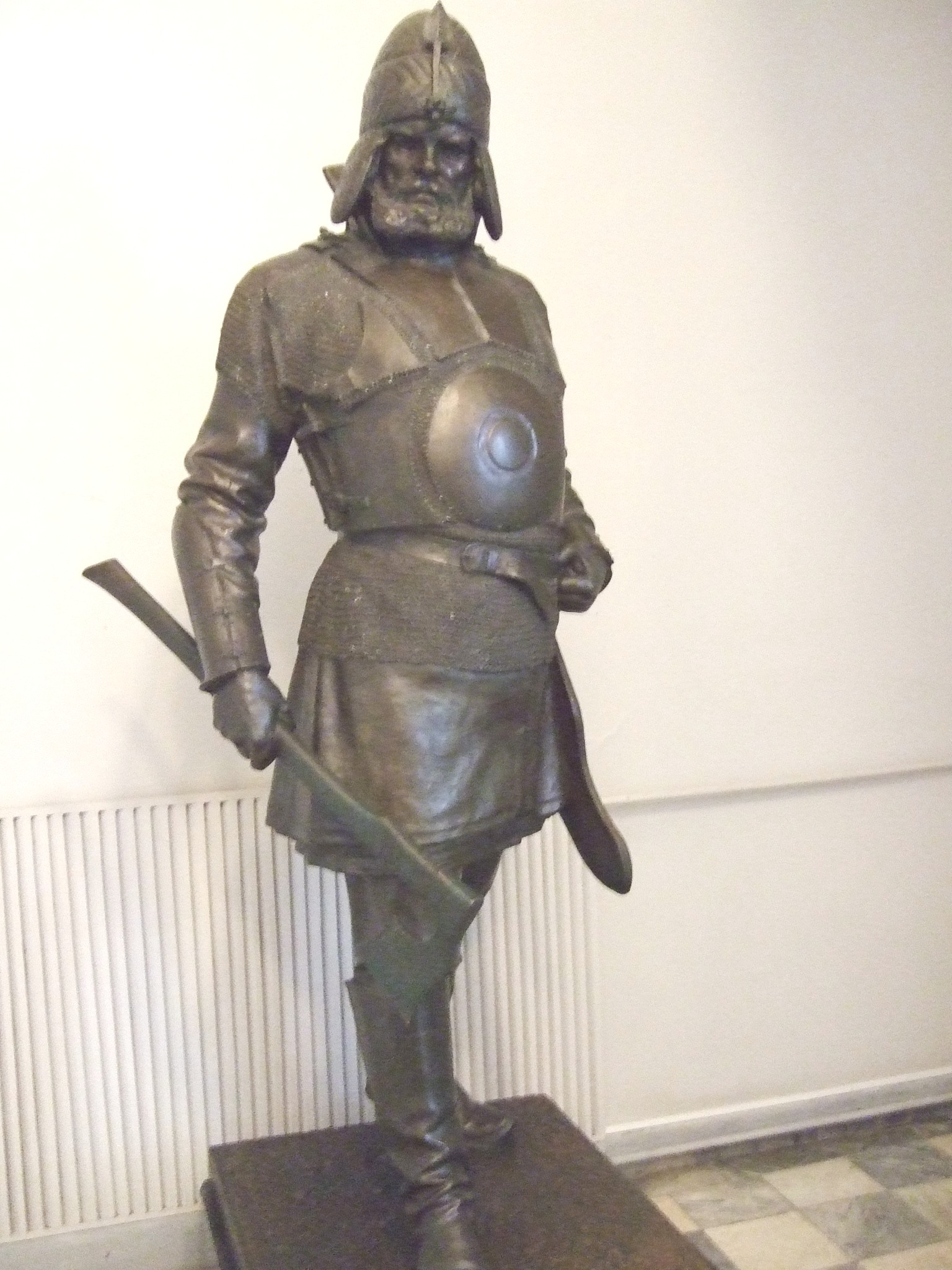
Yermak Timofeyevich

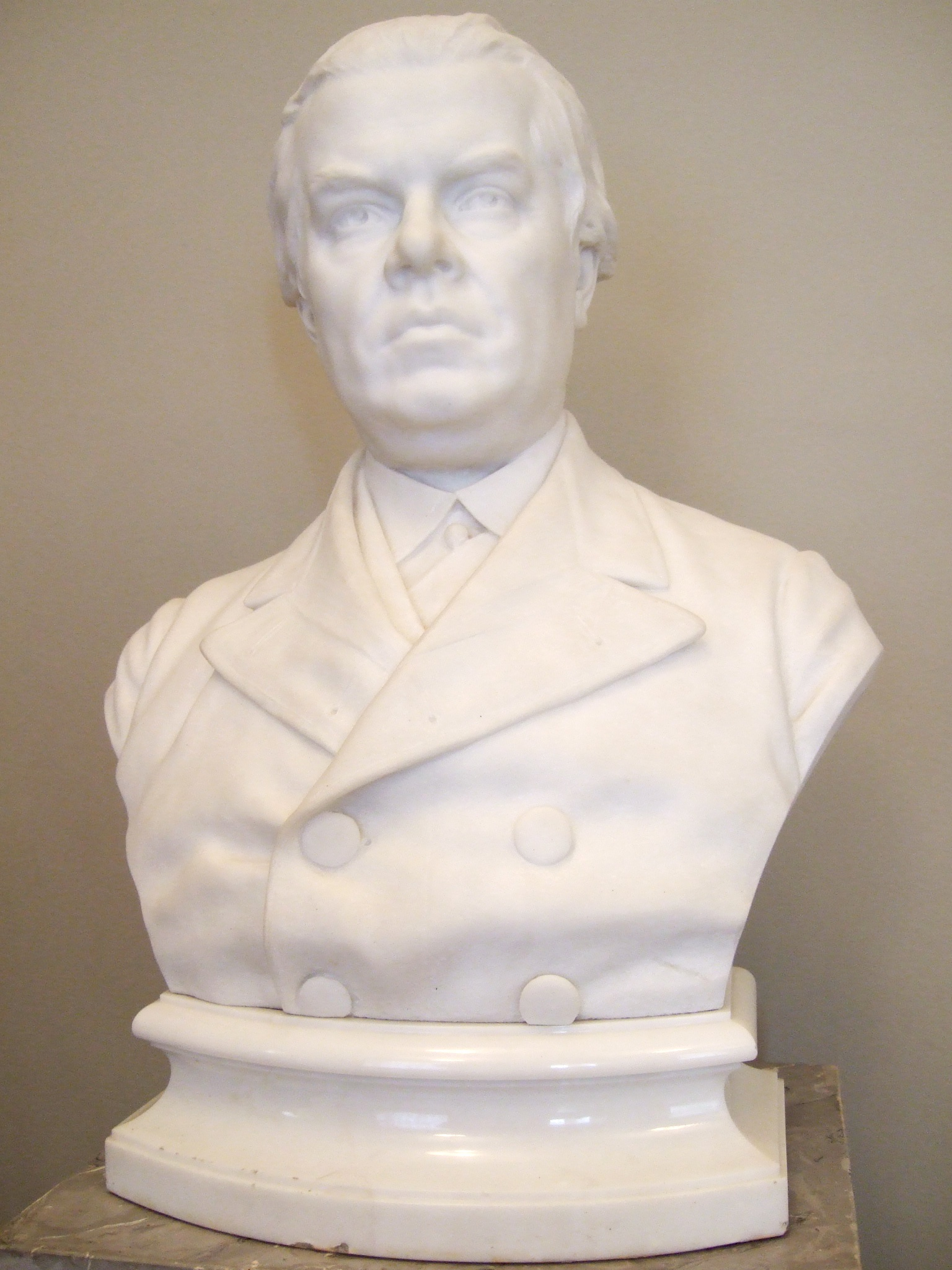
Alexander Polovtsov, 1880s

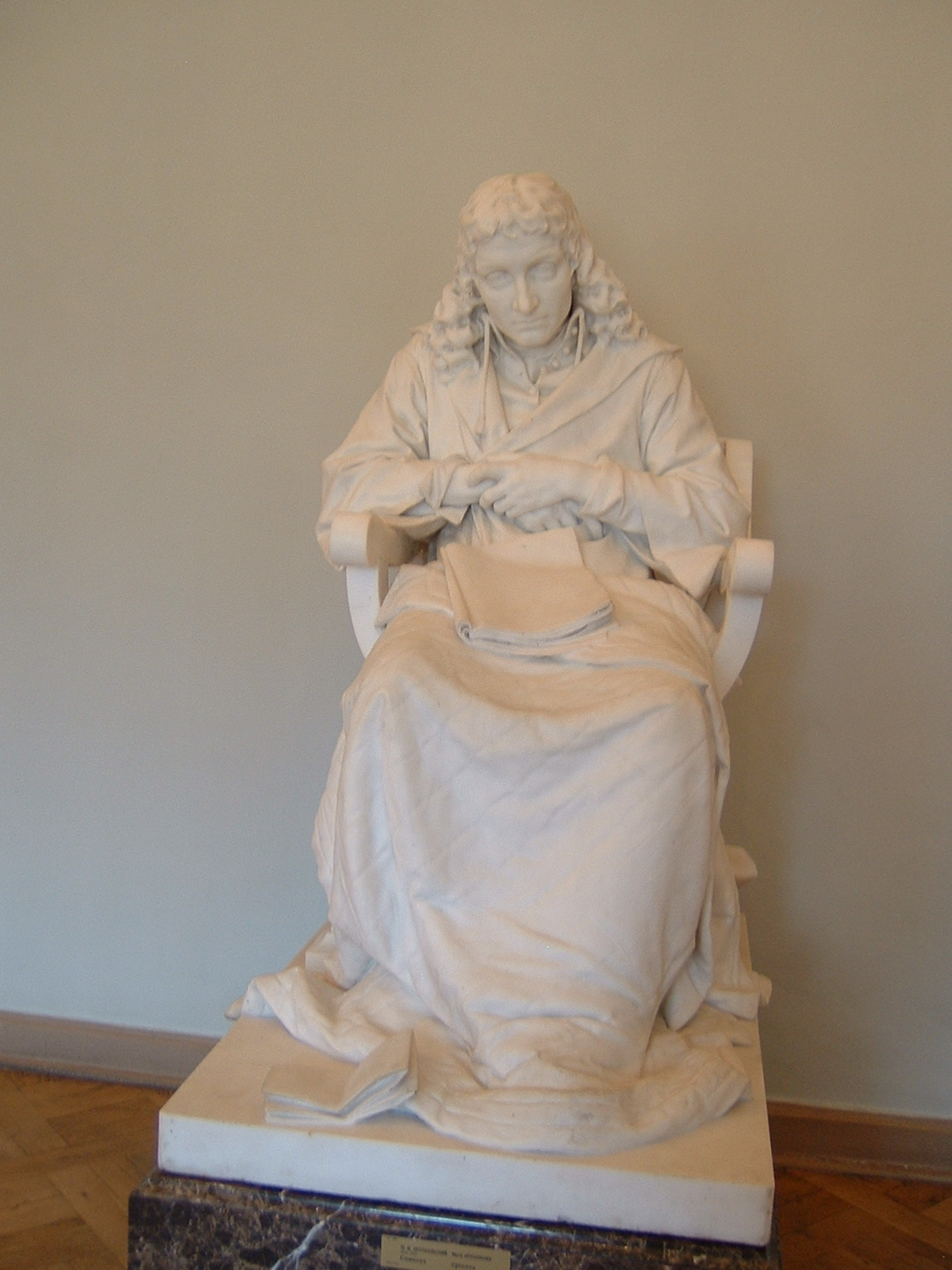
Spinoza, 1882

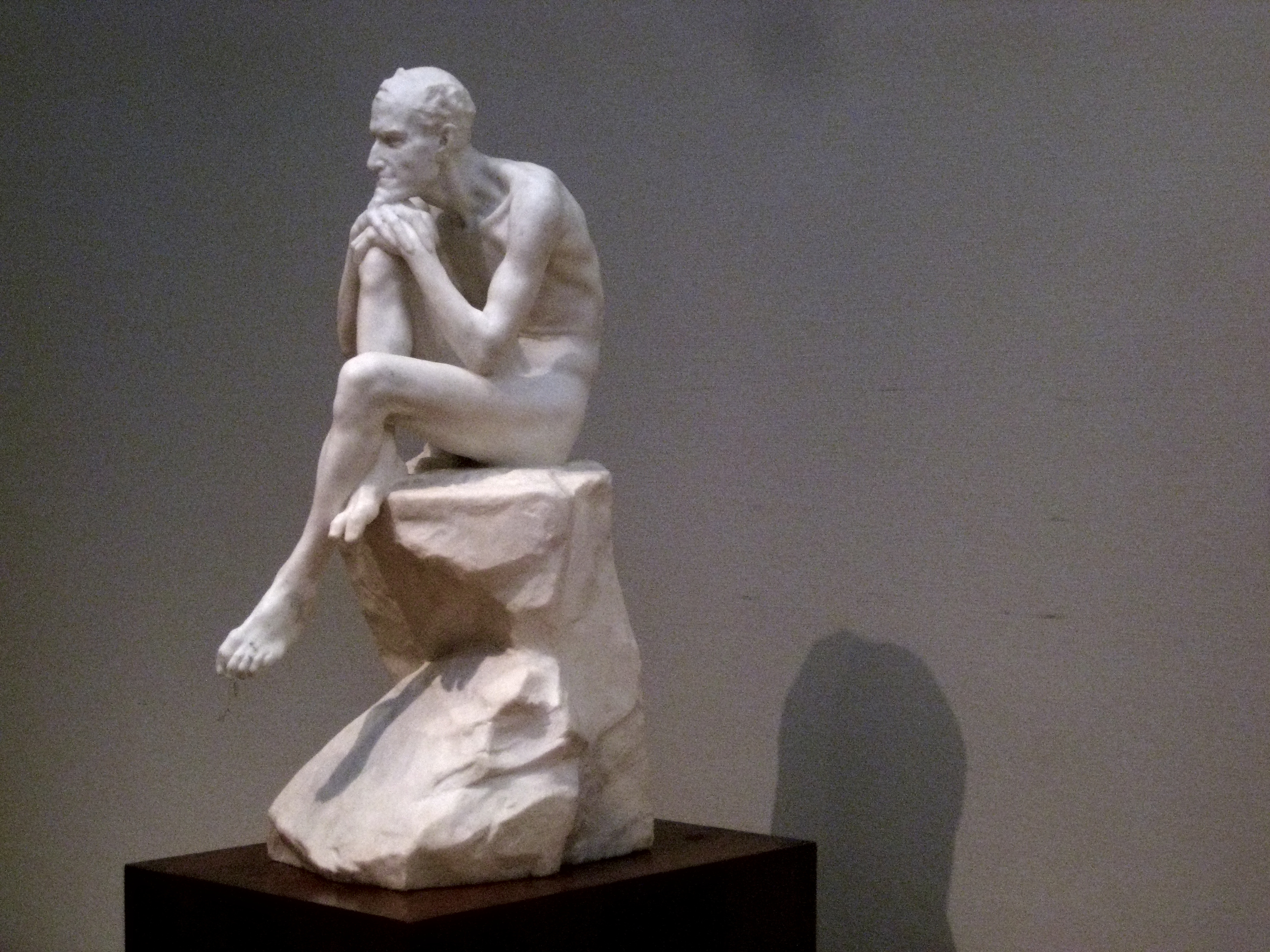
Mephistopheles, 1884

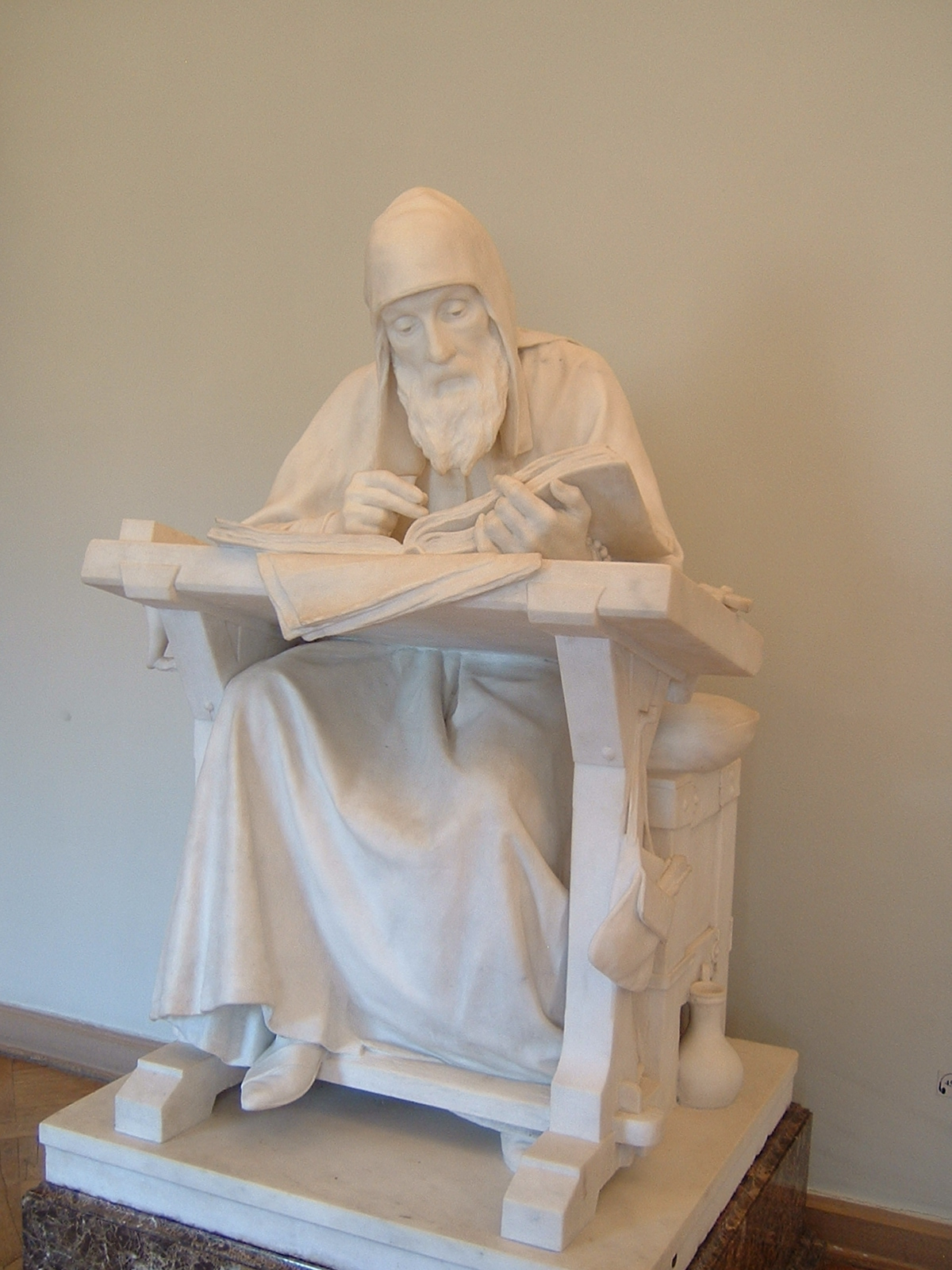
Nestor the Chronicler, 1890

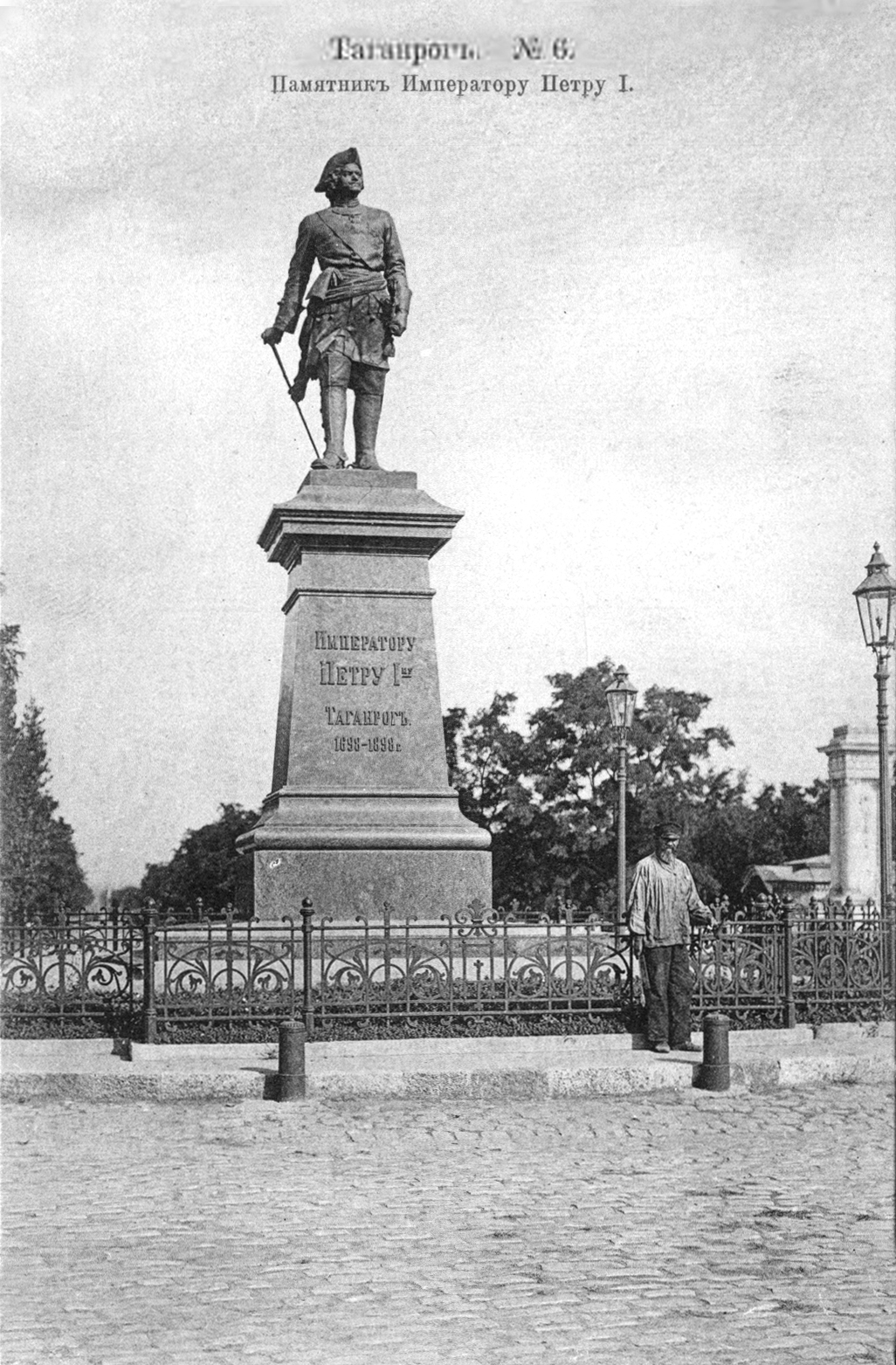
The Peter the Great Monument in the city of Taganrog, 1898

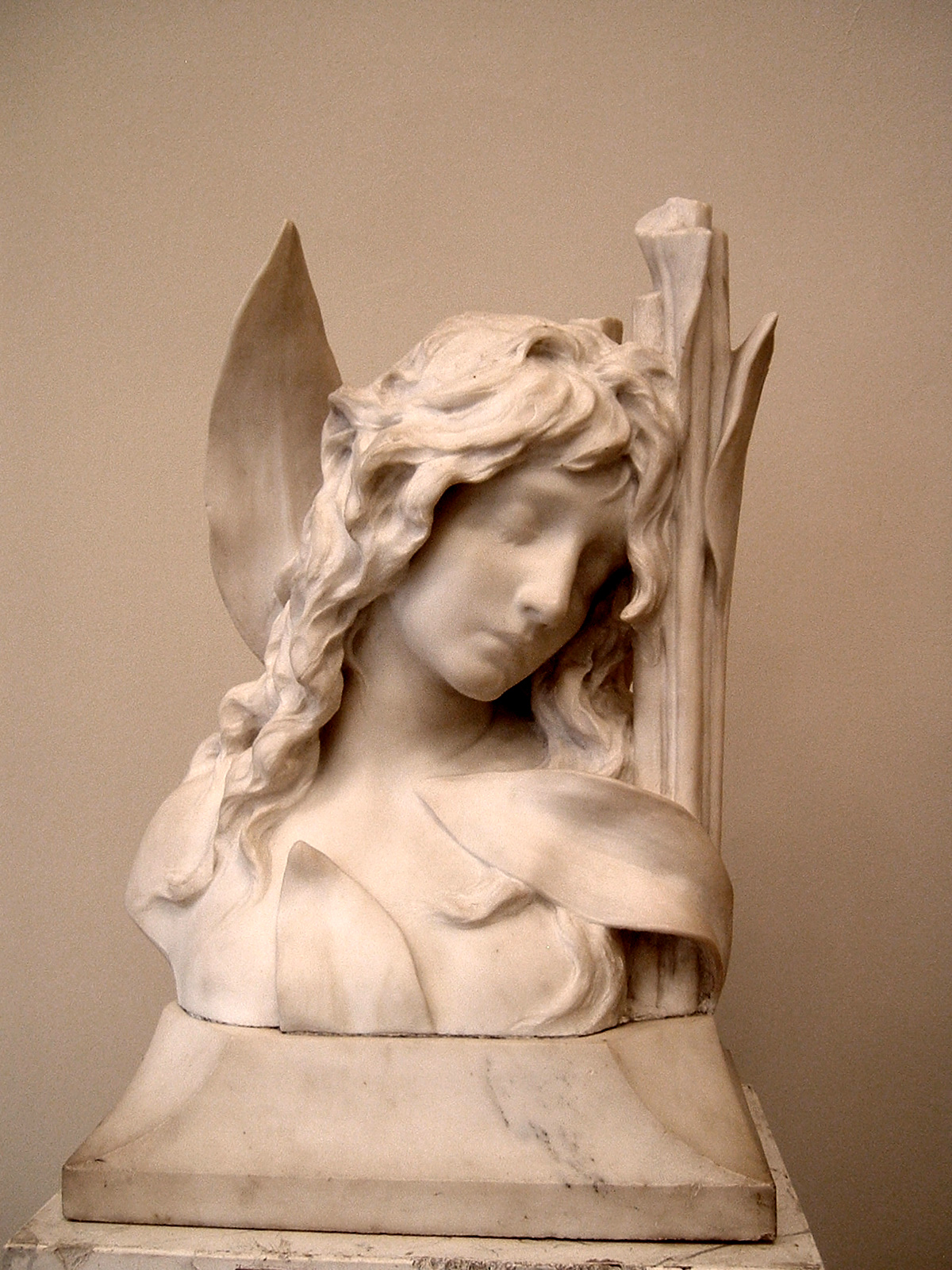
Mermaid, 1900

== Publications ==
- Antokolsky, Mark M. (1905). Stasov, Vladimir V. (ed.). Марк Матвеевич Антокольский: его жизнь, творения, письма и статьи (in Russian). Saint Petersburg, Moscow: Maurycy Wolff and Partners. OCLC 5432568.
