= Dubrowna district =

District of Vitebsk region, Belarus

Dubrowna district Дубровенскі раён (Belarusian)
- District
- Flag Coat of arms

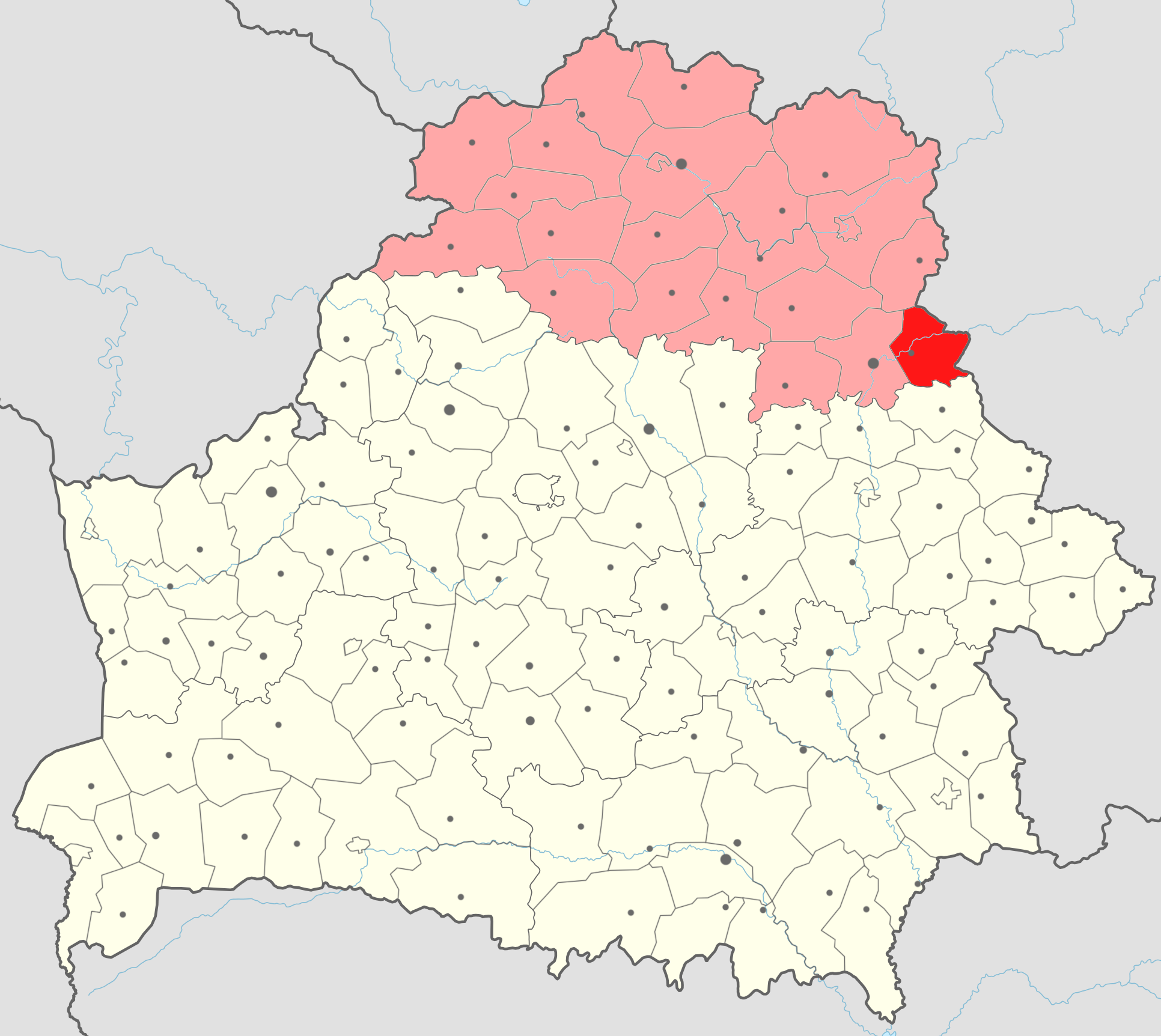
- Coordinates: 54°34′N 30°41′E
- Country: Belarus
- Region: Vitebsk region
- Administrative center: Dubrowna

Area
  - Total: 1,249.70 km^{2} (482.51 sq mi)
- Elevation: 208 m (682 ft)

Population (2023)
  - Total: 13,386
  - Density: 10.711/km^{2} (27.742/sq mi)
- Time zone: UTC+3 (MSK)

Dubrowna district (also Dubroŭna district; Belarusian: Дубровенскі раён; Russian: Дубровенский район) is a district (raion) of Vitebsk region in Belarus. Its administrative center is Dubrowna.
