= Svaika =

External videos
- Svaika game
- Making a spear for the game

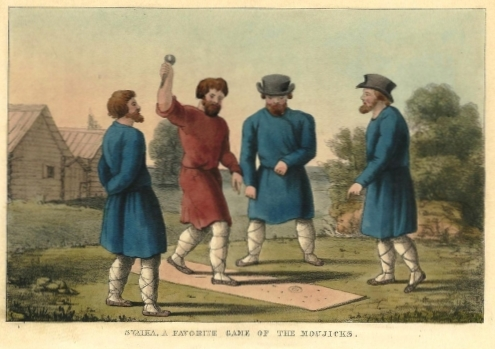
Men throwing marlinspike, about 1800

Svaika (Russian: Свайка, IPA: [ˈsvajkə], lit. 'marlinspike') is a traditional throwing game that was popular among lower-class Russian men up to the 20th century. The game involves tossing a marlinspike-like spear so that it lands within a metal ring placed on the ground at a certain distance. A tool for the game can weigh up to five pounds.

By one account of events, Tsarevich Dmitry died from a stab wound while he was playing this game, although this is disputed.
