= 110th Guards Rifle Division =

- Active: 1943–1946
- Country: Soviet Union
- Branch: Red Army (1943-46)
- Type: Division
- Role: Infantry
- Engagements: Battle of the Dniepr; Kremenchug-Pyatikhatki Offensive; Kirovograd offensive Uman–Botoșani offensive First Jassy–Kishinev Offensive; Second Jassy–Kishinev Offensive; Budapest Offensive; Battle of Debrecen; Siege of Budapest; Bratislava–Brno offensive Prague Offensive; Soviet invasion of Manchuria
- Decorations: Order of the Red Banner; Order of Suvorov
- Battle honours: Aleksandria; Khingan

Commanders
- Notable commanders: Maj. Gen. Mikhail Ivanovich Ogorodov; Col. Dmitrii Filippovich Sobolev; Col. Aleksandr Ivanovich Malchevskii; Maj. Gen. Grigorii Arkhipovich Krivolapov

The 110th Guards Rifle Division was formed as an elite infantry division of the Red Army from July into September 1943, based on the 5th Guards Rifle Brigade and the 7th Guards Rifle Brigade and was the third of a small series of Guards divisions formed on a similar basis. It would follow a very similar combat path to the 108th and 109th Guards Rifle Divisions and would serve well into the postwar era.

The 110th joined the active Army on September 7 as part of 37th Army of Steppe Front during the advance through eastern Ukraine to the Dniepr River. Upon reaching this objective late in the month it helped to force a crossing southeast of Kremenchug following which nearly 30 of the division's personnel were made Heroes of the Soviet Union. By October 10 the bridgehead was well established and on the 15th the division began breaking out as part of 5th Guards Army. In very short order in December and January 1944 the 110th Guards was awarded a divisional honorific, the Order of the Red Banner and the Order of Suvorov. During February it was transferred to the 49th Rifle Corps of 53rd Army; it would remain under this Army command for the duration of the war and this Corps for most of it. Along with the rest of 2nd Ukrainian Front it reached the border of Moldavia along the Dniestr River in early April but the advance soon stalled along this line. When a new offensive against the Axis forces began in August the 53rd Army played a secondary role and quickly advanced through Romania and into Hungary, reaching the border with Slovakia by December. Once Budapest fell in February 1945 the 110th Guards joined in the offensive which overran the latter country in March and April, during which its regiments received several decorations. After finishing the war with Germany near Prague it then moved with its Army to the far east, joining the 18th Guards Rifle Corps, and took part in the offensive into Manchuria, winning a second battle honor in the process although it saw little actual fighting. After the war it was moved with its Corps to western Siberia but was soon converted back to a Guards rifle brigade at Irkutsk.

== Formation ==
By mid-1943 most of the Red Army's remaining rifle brigades were being amalgamated into rifle divisions as experience had shown this was a more efficient use of manpower.

=== 5th Guards Rifle Brigade ===
This brigade began service as the 2nd formation of the 1st Airborne Brigade which had formed in Volkhov Front in February - March 1942. It was soon assigned to the 6th Guards Rifle Corps but largely remained in the Front reserves until July 30 when it began reforming as the 5th Guards Rifle Brigade far to the south in the Transcaucasus Military District. In August it was moved to the North Caucasus where it joined the 10th Guards Rifle Corps and it remained under this command until it was reformed. For nearly a year it took part in battles against German Army Group A in the Caucasus region, eventually facing the defenses of 17th Army in the Kuban bridgehead in the early summer of 1943. In July it was removed to the Reserve of the Supreme High Command and sent to the Voronezh region.

=== 7th Guards Rifle Brigade ===
The 7th Guards was formed from July 30 to August 10, 1942, from the 3rd formation of the 3rd Airborne Brigade in the Transcaucasus Military District and was immediately assigned to the 10th Guards Rifle Corps. By January 1943 it had reached the German defenses in the Taman Peninsula and for the next several months was involved in the costly and mostly futile battles of attrition for these powerful positions, during which it was awarded the Order of the Red Banner on March 31. In July it was also moved to the Reserve of the Supreme High Command for rebuilding and reforming.

On August 3, 1943, the combined brigades officially became the 110th Guards in the 37th Army which was in the Reserve of the Supreme High Command; as they were already Guards formations there was no presentation of a Guards banner. Once the division completed its reorganization its non-standard order of battle was as follows:

- 307th Guards Rifle Regiment
- 310th Guards Rifle Regiment
- 313th Guards Rifle Regiment
- 247th Guards Cannon Artillery Regiment
- 636th Guards Divisional Artillery Brigade
- 823rd Guards Mortar Regiment
- 109th Guards Antitank Battalion
- 106th Guards Reconnaissance Company
- 117th Guards Sapper Battalion
- 169th Guards Signal Battalion (later 141st Guards Signal Company)
- 111th Guards Medical/Sanitation Battalion
- 107th Guards Chemical Defense (Anti-gas) Company
- 108th Guards Motor Transport Company
- 112th Guards Field Bakery
- 104th Guards Divisional Veterinary Hospital
- 2290th Field Postal Station
- 1274th Field Office of the State Bank

The division was placed under the command of Col. Mikhail Ivanovich Ogorodov who had previously served as deputy commanding officer of the 3rd Rifle Corps and had been appointed commander of the 7th Guards Brigade while it was in Reserve. It had considerably more artillery than a standard regular or Guards rifle division, close to that of a small rifle corps. (Its veterinary hospital also shared the same number with that of the 109th Guards.) When it joined the active army in September it was noted that 70 percent of its personnel were of several Asian nationalities while nearly all the remainder were Russian. The division did not inherit the Order of the Red Banner from the 7th Brigade.

== Battle of the Dniepr ==
As of the beginning of September the 37th Army consisted of four rifle divisions (62nd Guards, 92nd Guards, 110th Guards and 53rd Rifle Division) all under command of 57th Rifle Corps. As the Red Army advanced through eastern Ukraine that month the Army was released from the Reserve of the Supreme High Command to reinforce Steppe Front (as of October 20 2nd Ukrainian Front). The Army began its offensive operation on September 24 along the approaches to the Dniepr in conjunction with the neighboring 53rd and 7th Guards Armies.

Steppe Front was facing the German 8th Army and part of the 1st Panzer Army which at this time were withdrawing toward Kremenchug in order to cross the Dniepr and organize a defense on its right (west) bank. 37th Army was in the Front's second echelon and was tasked with seizing a bridgehead southeast of that city following initial crossings by 69th Army. This Army had been weakened in previous fighting and was disregarded as a threat by the German command. 37th Army's commander, Lt. Gen. M. N. Sharokhin, was ordered to force march to the 69th's sector and capture a bridgehead between Uspenskoye and Myshuryn Rih on September 27. For this purpose the Army was heavily reinforced from the 69th Army, including the 89th Guards Rifle Division and a great deal of artillery. As of September 25 the 110th Guards recorded a strength of 8,818 men; 490 light and 171 heavy machine guns; 75 82mm and 16 120mm mortars; 40 45mm antitank guns; 32 76mm cannons and 12 122mm howitzers. (The division's additional artillery assets are not included.) This was very similar to that of the other divisions in 57th Corps.

The division comprised the Corps' second echelon and was ordered to concentrate in the Baranniki–Zabegailovka–Kovalenki area by 1600 hours on September 27, making ready to force the river. The forward detachments of the first echelon 62nd Guards and 92nd Guards had reached the Dniepr as early as 0200 hours that day while the 110th Guards was on the march northeast of Ozery, 15–20 km from the river. The leading divisions were unable to immediately start crossing operations due to the absence of equipment and had to gather materials for rafts and other improvised means. General Sharokhin and a group of staff officers soon arrived at Ozery and organized an auxiliary command post. 37th Army's crossing sector was 29 km wide and the Army had a total of 1,204 guns and mortars available, although a significant number of these had fallen behind due to shortages of fuel. 57th Corps had about 655 guns and mortars available to support the crossings of the forward detachments. The remnants of the German 106th and 39th Infantry Divisions, numbering about 4,500 officers and men with up to 200 machine guns and up to 160 guns and mortars, were withdrawing across the river near the village of Koleberda en route to taking up a 25 km-wide defensive sector along the west bank. In addition elements of the 8th SS Cavalry Division Florian Geyer were operating on that bank.

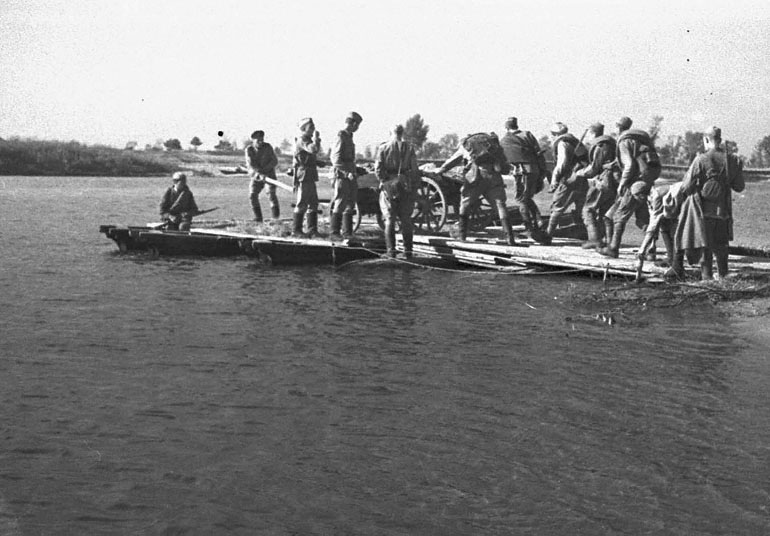
Soviet soldiers crossing the Dniepr on improvised rafts.

The 62nd Guards was able to land two battalions beginning at the onset of darkness on the 27th, one on an island southwest of Soloshino and the other at a jetty north of Myshuryn Rih. At the same time the 92nd Guards attempted a crossing to another island south of Botsuly but this was discovered while still in mid-river; two pontoons were sunk by artillery fire and a third forced back which caused the crossing to be suspended. By the end of the day on September 28 the 62nd's 182nd Guards Rifle Regiment held a bridgehead 4–6 km deep and 5–6 km wide while the 184th Guards Regiment had also obtained a smaller but still substantial lodgement. The main goal of 37th Army on September 29–30 was to expand the existing bridgeheads, consolidate them, and repel increasingly powerful counterattacks. Overnight on September 28/29 the 110th Guards was committed from 57th Corps' second echelon to reinforce the 62nd Guards' bridgeheads. As well various crossing equipment arrived with the Army, including 21 half-pontoons and 67 boats, both A-3 small inflatables and collapsible canvas-sided types. During the day elements of the 23rd Panzer Division began arriving in the Myshuryn Rih area. Overnight on September 29/30 the 92nd Guards' 282nd Guards Rifle Regiment was landed in the 62nd Guards bridgehead east of Deriivka, while the remainder of that division's own forces, apart from its artillery regiment, crossed as well.

The 110th Guards was directed to launch its main attack, after crossing, on Kutsevolovka and Ustimovka and occupy a line from Hill 158.4 to Yasinovatka and subsequently to take Ustimovka. Sharokhin was determined to have four divisions across the Dniepr by the end of September 29 holding a bridgehead 30 km wide and 10 km deep, but this was unrealistic. Since most of the available crossing equipment was in use by the 62nd Guards the division was delayed until 1700 hours, well behind schedule. By midnight two battalions of the 310th Guards Rifle Regiment and all three of the 313th Guards Regiment's battalions had entered the 62nd Guards' bridgehead, with the latter Regiment concentrating in the Koshikov ravine along the northern outskirts of Myshuryn Rih on the 62nd Guards' right flank. The 307th Guards Rifle Regiment and the divisional artillery remained on the east bank. Heavy fighting for the bridgehead began at dawn. 23rd Panzer had been ordered to eliminate the foothold, and began with two attacks from 0500 to 0600 hours with up to a battalion of infantry backed by 20 tanks from the Nezamozhnik area. These attacks were beaten off by artillery and machine gun fire but a renewed effort from Kaluzhino at 1100 hours managed to break through with 15 tanks and 11 Sd.Kfz. 251 vehicles carrying infantry to the area of height 127.5. A decisive counterattack drove these off but the 62nd Guards had to largely rely on its own resources; the 110th Guards was forced to be committed piecemeal and along several axes and without necessary artillery support. The 310th and 307th Guards Regiments reached Lake Liman and got into a battle for Deriivka while Sharokhin ordered the 313th Guards Regiment to move up to the northeastern outskirts of Myshuryn Rih to secure the Army's flank.

For October 1 the 92nd Guards and 110th Guards received orders to seize Deriivka and reach a line from the Pershe Travnya Collective Farm to Petrovka to Ploskoye. Meanwhile, the 43rd Tank Regiment was directed to cross to the right bank overnight and to operate with the division to expand the bridgehead; it was able to convey nine T-34s before dawn. By this time the German defense included from 100 to 130 tanks with the arrival of lead elements of 3rd SS Panzergrenadier Division Totenkopf and Großdeutschland Division. During the morning the division finally completed its crossing and the 307th and 310th Guards Regiments were fighting for the southern part of Deriivka and Kutsevolovka; by day's end the division had captured the southeastern part of Deriivka, Hill 167.8 and Kutsevolovka. In addition the 313th Guards Regiment, in cooperation with the 30th Guards Airborne Regiment of the 10th Guards Airborne Rifle Division (82nd Rifle Corps), cleared Myshuryn Rih and reached its southern outskirts. Despite these gains the overall bridgehead remained much the same size due to ongoing counterattacks and the persistent shortage of crossing equipment and ammunition.

=== Battle for Height 177.0 ===
By 1400 hours on October 2 the 43rd Tanks completed its crossing and assisted the 110th Guards in repelling two powerful counterattacks before advancing together up to 1000m and taking the line of heights from point 179.9 to point 192.7. General Sharokhin's first priority for the following day was to link up the lodgements of his 57th Corps and the 89th Guards. However, the German forces in the area south of Myshuryn Rih were now being reinforced with elements of the 6th Panzer Division. During the day the 307th Guards Regiment was involved in fighting for Hill 158.4 and Guardsman Pavel Sergeevich Ponomaryov began his path toward becoming one of nearly 30 men of the division to be made Heroes of the Soviet Union. Serving as a gun layer on one of the Regiment's 45mm antitank guns he moved his gun to an open space when the advance was being held up a German heavy machine gun; with one shot he destroyed the position. Later that day, during a counterattack his fire destroyed a tank and an automobile. On October 7 the Regiment was counterattacked at height 177.0 by infantry supported by 10 tanks. After assisting other gunners in forcing the infantry to ground with the fire of fragmentation shells Ponomaryov set the lead tank on fire and knocked out two more at a range of 150m-200m, forcing the rest to retreat. On February 22, 1944, he was awarded the Gold Star and the Order of Lenin while he was in hospital, having been seriously wounded in both legs on October 26. He never returned to the front but continued to serve in the training establishment until 1976 when he retired with the rank of captain. He died at Tashkent in 1990.

37th Army had received more crossing equipment and overnight on October 3/4 began moving the 1st Mechanized Corps to the west bank; by morning all of 57th Corps, including artillery, was over as well. The Corps renewed the offensive along with 82nd Corps but they were unable to achieve any decisive success due to fierce resistance and numerous counterattacks. Units of the 110th Guards were involved in particularly heavy fighting. Despite this by day's end four ferry crossings to the bridgehead were operating regularly and its depth, now up to 8 km, prevented aimed German artillery fire against them. On the following night the division made an attack and occupied a line from height 118.1 to height 105.2 to height 177.0. Its officers and men acted boldly and decisively in this night action. Having broken into the trench line the Guardsmen killed 20 German soldiers in hand-to-hand combat and captured a gun. The commander of a platoon, Lieutenant Maslya, turned the weapon on the German troops and forced them to fall back. Although wounded, Maslya continued to lead his unit.

For October 6 Sharokhin placed the priority on linking up with the 7th Guards Army's bridgehead and ordered the 57th Corps to hold its positions and pin down the German forces to prevent them from interfering with the main effort. During the next four days stubborn fighting continued along the 37th Army's front. On October 9 the action was particularly intense on the 110th Guards' sector, where the German forces undertook eight counterattacks in strength of one to two battalions of infantry supported by 8-12 tanks. In bitter fighting and at heavy cost these attacks managed to push back elements of the division on individual sectors. The 307th Guards Rifle Regiment was pushed back on the night of October 8/9 to the area of height 177.0. This point was only seized when all its defenders were killed or wounded, but the struggle continued into the morning when a company of scouts and sappers from the Regiment's headquarters retook the height. During the afternoon a further costly attack put the position in German hands again.

On this day another man of the division earned the Gold Star of a Hero of the Soviet Union. Guardsman Gainansha Haydarshinovich Haydarshin was a section leader of the 117th Guards Sapper Battalion and during the day made no fewer than 27 boat crossings of the Dniepr carrying men, equipment and ammunition. On the last trip his boat was pierced by a mortar shell fragment and began to sink but he was able to repair it well enough to make the far bank. After landing he joined the fighting on Hill 177.0 and knocked out a tank despite being injured by blast. His award was decreed on February 22, 1944, and his Gold Star was presented personally by Marshal G. K. Zhukov. Haydarshin was discharged from the Red Army the same month and returned to his native Bashkiria where he worked in agriculture until his retirement. He died on December 4, 2006, at the age of 95. During the next day it became clear that the German forces were exhausted and the Front commander, Col. Gen. I. S. Konev, ordered the 5th Guards Army to enter the Myshuryn Rih bridgehead and expand it in preparation for a planned breakout by 5th Guards Tank Army in the direction of Piatykhatky.

== Into Western Ukraine ==
The 110th Guards was transferred to 5th Guards Army later in the month after that Army crossed to the west bank and served into early November directly under Army control. The Kremenchug-Pyatikhatki Offensive began on October 15 when a dozen rifle divisions attacked out of the bridgehead and by the next day had torn open the left flank of 1st Panzer Army. On October 18 Piatykhatky was liberated, cutting the main railroads to Dnepropetrovsk and Kryvyi Rih, which was the obvious next objective. The lead elements of 2nd Ukrainian Front reached the outskirts of Kryvyi Rih but were counterattacked on the 27th by the XXXX Panzer Corps, driving them back some 32 km and doing considerable damage to the Red Army formations in the process.

=== Battles in the Dniepr Bend ===
On November 13 the 2nd Ukrainian Front gained several small bridgeheads on both sides of Cherkasy and quickly expanded the one north until it threatened to engulf the city and tear open the front of German 8th Army. Ten days later, with gaps in its front lines around the Cherkasy bridgehead and north of Kryvyi Rih, the chief of staff of that Army pleaded for permission to stage a general withdrawal but this was denied. During November and the first three weeks of December Konev was content to fight a battle of attrition with the 1st Panzer and 8th Armies which he could better afford, gradually clearing the right bank of the Dniepr north to Cherkasy. As of December 1 the 110th Guards was in the 32nd Guards Rifle Corps of 5th Guards Army.

On December 6 the division was recognized for its role in the expansion of the Dniepr bridgehead and the liberation of the city of Aleksandria with its name as a battle honor. Just days later, on December 10 the 110th Guards was awarded the Order of the Red Banner in recognition of its role in this fighting, The Front was ordered over to the defensive on December 20 as replacements were absorbed by the fighting units and supplies were replenished. On January 5, 1944, it threw a powerful blow directly at the boundary between the 8th and 6th German Armies which broke through and swept northward, reaching nearly to Kirovograd in a matter of hours. The next day the attack swept north and south around the city, encircling the XXXXVII Panzer Corps, which was forced to break out and abandon the city on January 8. On the same date the division was decorated with the Order of Suvorov, 2nd Degree. Colonel Ogorodov was hospitalized due to illness on January 10 and was replaced by his deputy commander Col. Dmitrii Filippovich Sobolev.

Appalling freeze-and-thaw weather brought the offensive to a premature end on the 16th. On January 24 a Front reconnaissance-in-force hit a nearly 20 km-wide stretch of 8th Army's line between Cherkasy and Kirovograd where there was no more than one infantryman for every 15 metres of front and penetrated deeply. This marked the start of the start of the encirclement battle of Korsun–Cherkassy which continued until February 16 but did not involve 5th Guards Army or the 110th Guards directly.

=== Advance to the Dniestr and First Jassy–Kishinev Offensive ===
Uman–Botoșani Offensive. Note location of 53rd Army.

In February the division was transferred to the 49th Rifle Corps in 53rd Army, and it would remain in this Army for the duration of the war. The Soviet spring offensive in the south began on March 4. 53rd Army was west of a line from Kirovograd to Cherkasy roughly in the center of its Front. Marshal Konev's first target was the city of Uman, which was taken on March 9, but two days earlier a secondary thrust by his left flank armies again struck the 6th Army/8th Army boundary. Within days the German forces were in full retreat toward the Southern Bug River, but the advance did not end there.

By April 1, after advancing through western Ukraine, 2nd Ukrainian Front was beginning to reach the Dniestr River. The 21st Guards Rifle Corps, supported on the left by 49th Corps, crossed the river on April 1 and 2 and began advancing against the 3rd Panzer Division's bridgehead defenses north of Susleni from the northeast and east. While this advance continued the 49th Corps attacked 3rd Panzer's right wing through April 4 and 5, with the 110th Guards and 1st Guards Airborne Rifle Divisions in first echelon and the 375th Rifle Division was in second echelon. Susleni was taken on April 7, which drove the panzer troops south to even stronger defenses. On the 11th the continued joint operation of the two Soviet Corps captured the town of Molovata on the west bank; this gave room for the 375th to be regrouped across the Dniestr and also rendered the bridgehead held by XXXX Panzer Corps north of the Răut River untenable. It was abandoned overnight on April 12/13, while the 49th Corps took over a sector from Furceni on the Răut to Holercani on the Dniestr.

The next objective for 53rd Army, commanded by Lt. Gen. I. M. Managarov, was the German bridgehead east of the Dniestr on the approaches to the cities of Dubăsari and Grigoriopol. 49th Corps had begun this advance on March 31, but had then been diverted to the fighting on the west bank. On April 13, with all three of the Corps' divisions west of the river, supported by 25th Guards Rifle Division, the advance resumed with heavy attacks on the German 282nd Infantry Division on the Golerkani sector. After two days of heavy fighting the German force withdrew southward to new defenses west of Dubăsari, but also received reinforcements from the 10th Panzergrenadier Division and Corps Detachment "F" which contained the Soviet advance. By this time the divisions of 53rd Army had fewer than 5,000 personnel each, and on April 18 the Front command ordered the Army over to the defense.

The same day Col. Ivan Adamovich Rotkevich took over command of the division from Colonel Sobolev who had taken over the 1st Guards Airborne Division; that officer would go on to become a Hero of the Soviet Union in April 1945. Colonel Rotkevich in turn was replaced by Col. Ivan Alekseevich Pigin on April 28 before Ogorodov returned on May 9, now with the rank of major general. On May 6 the 53rd Army received orders to take part in a new offensive on Chișinău that was to be primarily conducted by forces of 3rd Ukrainian Front. 49th Corps was to commit the 110th Guards to reinforce 26th Guards Rifle Corps as part of the Army's shock group, while the 375th and 1st Guards Airborne were to remain on the defense on the Army's front westward to south of Orhei. In the event, the defeat inflicted on the right flank forces of 2nd Ukrainian Front in the Târgu Frumos area caused this offensive to be postponed and eventually cancelled.

=== Second Jassy–Kishinev Offensive ===
By the beginning of June the 110th Guards was serving as a separate rifle division under direct Army control but a month later it returned to 49th Corps; as of August 1 the Corps contained only the 110th Guards and the 375th while the 1st Guards Airborne was serving separately. In the buildup to the Second Jassy–Kishinev Offensive in early August the 53rd Army was regrouped out of the front line into Front reserves. 49th Corps was ordered to move from the Front's left flank to the center which required four daily marches. The plan called for the Army to be part of the exploitation force which would be released once the shock formations penetrated the German–Romanian front. Once this occurred the Army was to advance in the general direction of Vaslui and Focșani. The offensive opened on August 20, and on the next day at 1900 hours the 53rd began moving up to the positions that had been vacated by the advancing 52nd Army. The Army was then ordered to move to the area south of the road from Podu Iloaiei to Iași overnight on August 22/23. In the following days minimal forces of the 53rd Army were committed to the reduction of the trapped Axis grouping while its main effort focused on Bucharest and the oilfields at Ploiești.

== Hungarian Campaign ==
Following its advance through Romania, on October 28 the left flank forces of 2nd Ukrainian Front, including 53rd Army, began an operation to defeat the German-Hungarian forces in and around Budapest. The main drive was carried out by 7th Guards and 46th Armies while the 53rd provided flank security. On October 29 the Army advanced up to 13 km and reached the outskirts of Polgár. By the morning of November 4 the 27th Army relieved the 53rd along the front from Polgár to Tiszafüred while it regrouped to force the Tisza River three days later. On November 11 the Army's right flank corps began fighting for the southern outskirts of Füzesabony; the town did not finally fall until the 15th after which General Managarov was ordered to develop the offensive in the direction of Verpelét. By November 20 the 53rd reached the southeastern slopes of the Mátra Mountains between Gyöngyös and Eger where the Axis forces were able to organize a powerful defense which brought the advance to a halt until November 26.

After it resumed Jr. Lt. Anatolii Petrovich Vishnevskii earned a posthumous Gold Star as a Hero of the Soviet Union on November 28. In fighting for the village of Andornaktálya on the outskirts of Eger the commander of Vishnevskii's battalion of the 307th Guards Rifle Regiment was killed and his deputy severely wounded. As the battalion Komsomol leader he took effective lead, renewed the attack and was the first man into the German trenches, killing three enemy soldiers in hand-to-hand combat. On the outskirts of the village the battalion was attacked by an armored halftrack which was destroyed with grenades by Vishnevskii and one other man. Later, within the village itself, the battalion was held up by a German machine gun in a cellar; Vishnevskii crawled up to the position and threw a grenade but was mortally wounded in the chest in the process. Despite his wounds his next grenade destroyed the gun and its crew. He was buried in Eger and was decreed a Hero of the Soviet Union on April 28, 1945. A school in his home city of Kharkiv was named in his honor. On December 16 the 307th Guards Regiment was awarded the Order of the Red Banner and the 247th Guards Cannon Artillery Regiment received the Order of Bogdan Khmelnitsky, 2nd Degree, for their roles in the fighting for Eger and Szikszó.

=== Advance into Slovakia ===
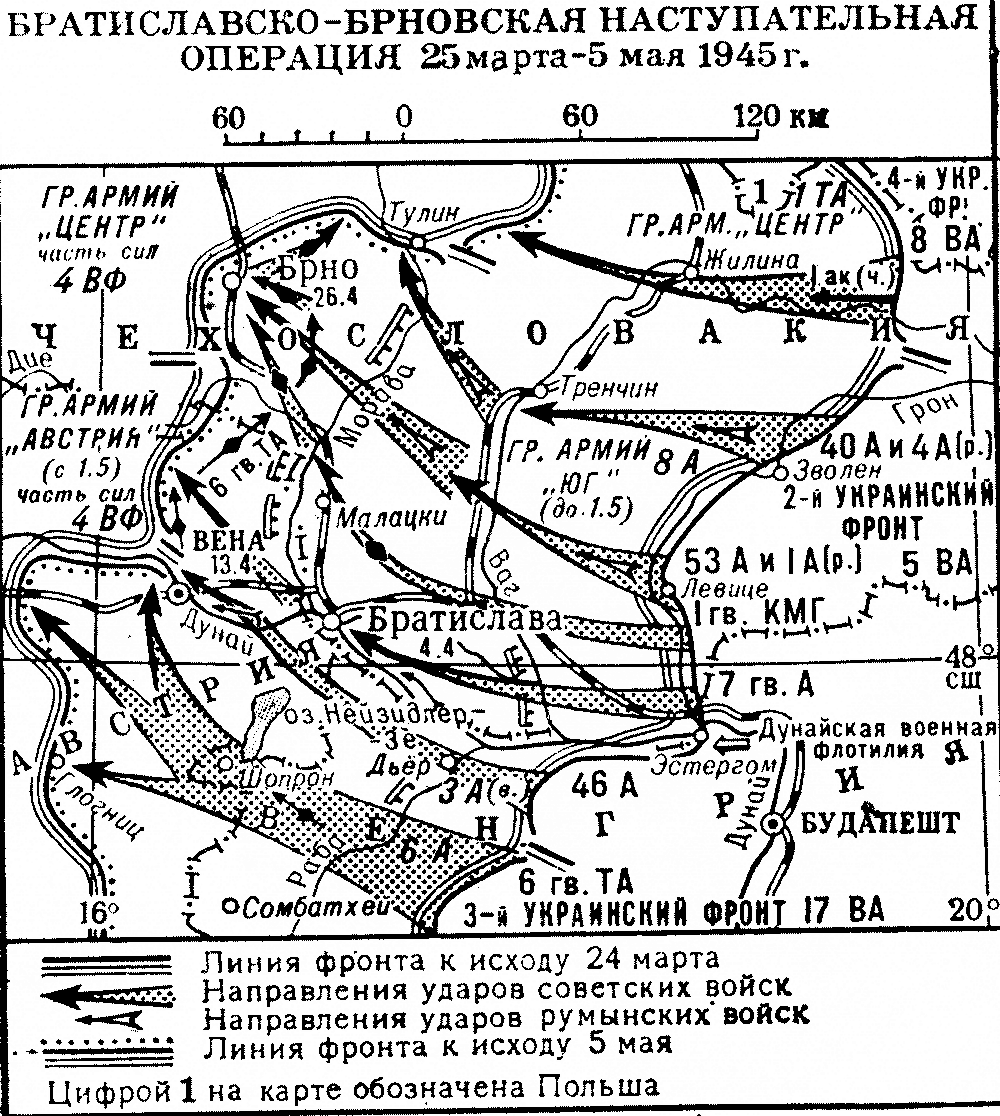
Bratislava-Brno Operation

By this time the division had been assigned back to the 57th Rifle Corps along with the 1st Guards Airborne and the 228th Rifle Division. A new phase of the offensive began on December 5. 53rd Army occupied a line from Eger to Lőrinci facing units of the German 6th Army and the Hungarian 3rd Army. The assault began at 1015 hours following a brief but powerful artillery preparation and the Army was able to advance 2–4 km on the first day despite facing defenses in mountainous terrain and the fighting continued through the night. In the days following the Army was only able to advance with its left-flank units and by December 9 was stalled along a line from Eger to Gyöngyös. The next phase involved completing the encirclement of Budapest and began on December 10 but again the 53rd Army advanced very little until Pliyev's Cavalry-Mechanized Group rolled up the German/Hungarian defense from the Šahy area in the general direction of Szoldiny.

On December 14 Plyiev was ordered to attack in the direction of Kisterenye in conjunction with 53rd Army advancing toward Pásztó. This made only modest progress and on December 18 General Managarov was directed to relieve Plyiev's Group to enable it to regroup for a new assignment. The next day the Army was tasked with reaching a line from Veľký Krtíš to Nemce to Želiezovce. The left-flank forces of 2nd Ukrainian Front attacked at 1000 hours on December 20 but on the first day the 53rd Army made only local advances. By December 29 it had reached a front from Kutas to Szécsény to Balassagyarmat. The encirclement of Budapest had been completed on December 26, and as of January 1, 1945 the 110th Guards had returned to 49th Rifle Corps where it joined with the 375th Rifle Division. Under this command the division played little direct role in the siege of Budapest.

Prior the defeat of the German Operation Spring Awakening in mid-March, mainly by 3rd Ukrainian Front, the 2nd Ukrainian Front renewed its advance into Czechoslovakia with 53rd Army roughly in the center of the Front. At this time it was noted that the personnel of the 110th Guards were roughly 67 percent Russian of the 1926-27 year groups, making a very young cadre, while most of the remainder were of Ukrainian nationality. Units of the Army liberated Banská Štiavnica on March 7 and in recognition for their roles the 310th Guards Rifle Regiment was awarded the Order of the Red Banner while the 313th Guards Regiment received the Order of Kutuzov, 3rd Degree, both on April 5. On April 19 General Ogorodov was directed to attend the K. Е. Voroshilov Higher Military Academy and he was replaced the next day by Col. Aleksandr Ivanovich Malchevskii who had just completed studies at the same institution. Following the German surrender, on May 17 the 307th Guards Regiment was presented with the Order of Suvorov, 3rd Degree, for its role in the liberation of Komárno, Vráble and other Slovak towns.

== Manchurian Campaign and Postwar ==
53rd Army was selected for transfer to the far east for the campaign against the Japanese Kwantung Army in Manchuria, largely due to its experience in fighting through the Carpathian Mountains during 1944–45. On July 8 Hero of the Soviet Union Maj. Gen. Grigorii Arkhipovich Krivolapov took over command of the division from Colonel Malchevskii. After crossing the continent via the Trans-Siberian Railway it joined the Transbaikal Front; by the beginning of August the 110th Guards was in the 18th Guards Rifle Corps, which also contained the 109th Guards Rifle and 1st Guards Airborne Divisions.

The Soviet operation began on August 9 but 53rd Army was in the Front's second echelon and remained in assembly areas in Mongolia until the second day when it began crossing the border in the tracks of 6th Guards Tank Army. The commander of Japanese 3rd Area Army had already ordered those of his forces not already cut off to withdraw to defend north and south of Mukden. The advance largely became a challenge to overcome the narrow roads and mountain passes of the Greater Khingan range. The Army accomplished this and on August 15 moved into the yawning gap between the 17th Army and 6th Guards Tanks with the objective to secure Kailu. The advance was unhindered and on September 1 the 53rd Army occupied Kailu, Chaoyang, Fuxin and Gushanbeitseifu while forward detachments reached the Chinchou area on the Gulf of Liaotung. In recognition of this victory the 110th Guards was awarded the honorific "Khingan" later that month.

With this final addition the soldiers of the division shared the official title 110th Guards Rifle, Aleksandria-Khingan, Order of the Red Banner, Order of Suvorov Division. (Russian: 110-я гвардейская стрелковая Александрийско-Хинганская Краснознамённая ордена Суворова дивизия.) 53rd Army was disbanded in October and in 1946 the 18th Guards Corps was transferred to the West Siberian Military District and headquartered at Omsk although the 110th was stationed at Irkutsk. In June 1946 it was converted to the 16th Guards Rifle Brigade and its successors continued to serve into the late 1950s.
