= 25th Army Corps (Soviet Union) =

The 25th Army Corps was an army corps of the Soviet Ground Forces active from 1957–1960 and 1980–89. In its first period of existence it was in the Odessa Military District, and in its second period of existence it garrisoned the remote Kamchatka region and Chukotka Autonomous Okrug of the Soviet Far East.

== World War II ==
=== First formation ===
The predecessor 25th Rifle Corps appears to have begun the Second World War in transit to the Kiev Fortified Region as part of the 19th Army, formed just before the war began. It comprised the 127th Rifle Division, the 134th Rifle Division, and the 162nd Rifle Division on 22 June 1941. From 19 June to 16 July, it was commanded by Major General Sergey Chestokhvalov. The 25th Corps' deputy commander was Kombrig Alexander Gorbatov, who had been recently released from the Gulag.

Bonn and Glantz say the 25th Rifle Corps was active from June–July 1941 (first formation).

=== Second formation ===
The corps was reformed in February 1943, and had five commanders during the war. On 25 December 1944 it formed part of the 69th Army, with the 4th, 41st, 77th Guards, and 415th Rifle Divisions. 4th Rifle Division within the corps took part in the fighting for the Puławy bridge in Poland in January 1945, and was much weakened.

Feskov et al 2013 indicates that on 10 July 1945, the corps, with 274th, 328th, and 370th Rifle Divisions, was part of 69th Army, in the Group of Soviet Forces in Germany, which had been formed the day before. However, the corps along with the remainder of 69th Army was disbanded in the summer of 1945.

== Postwar ==
82nd Rifle Corps existed until 13 June 1955, when it was renamed 25th Rifle Corps, which included 20th Rifle Division at Zaporizhia. On 25 June 1957 the corps was renamed 25th Army Corps (AK). Its headquarters was in Nikolayev with the 28th Guards Motor Rifle Division, 34th Guards Motor Rifle Division, 93rd Motor Rifle Division (Zaporizhia, 5.57 – March 1959) and the 95th Motor Rifle Division in the late 1950s. Disbanded 6.60.

== Cold War in the Far East ==
The corps was reformed in February 1980 in Petropavlovsk-Kamchatsky as part of the Far Eastern Military District, under the command of Major General (promoted to Lieutenant General 16 December 1982) Alexey Tyurin. Between 1984 and 1985 its commander was Major General Anatoly Kostenko. The corps was disbanded in the summer of 1989.

=== Order of Battle in the 1980s ===
Authoritative Russian forum sources (Soldat.ru) report that in 1984 the corps comprised 22 MRD (Petropavlovsk-Kamchatsky), 23rd Independent Motor Rifle Brigade (Gudym or Anadyr), and 138th Independent Motor Rifle Regiment (Magadan). Questions remain over a putative 101st Motor Rifle Division.

At the end of the 1980s the composition of the 25th Army Corps of the Far East Military District included:

Formation	Location	Remarks
25th Army Corps	Petropavlovsk-Kamchatsky	
22nd Motor Rifle Division	Petropavlovsk-Kamchatsky	'Krasnodar-Harbin Twice Red Banner'; 59th Tank Regt., 211th, 246th, 304th Motor Rifle Regiments, 157th Artillery Regt, 1006th Anti-Aircraft Rocket Regiment
87th Motor Rifle Division	Chapaevka, Microdistrict of Petropavlovsk-Kamchatsky	Mobilisation division, 'shadow' of 22 MRD. Disbanded 1987 The Chapaevka vehicle/equipment stores were located at 53 03 19N, 158 49 35E. Chapaevka began as a part of Yelizovsky District but was merged into Petropavlovsk-Kamchatsky before 2001.
99th Motor Rifle Division	Ugolnye Kopi, Chukotka	Formed from 23rd Independent Motor Rifle Brigade 1984. Consisted of 1324th and 1327th MRRs. Division converted on 1 June 1999 to the 3840th Military Technology Storage Base until it was disbanded on 1 December 2002.

Other corps-level troops reported by Feskov et al. 2013, as of 1988, included the 240th (Chapaevka) and 280th Separate Engineer-Sapper Bаttalions (Ugolnye Kopi), the Staff of the 25th Army Corps; 11th Mixed Aviation Squadron (Ugolnye Kopi), the 138th Separate Motor Rifle Regiment (Magadan), and the 571st Separate Spetsnaz Company (Yelizovo).
