= Pavel Grigoryevich Kuznetsov =

Soviet Army lieutenant general

- Kuznetsov, 1946
- Born: 24 December 1901; Lelyukhino, Belyovsky Uyezd, Tula Governorate, Russian Empire
- Died: 19 May 1982 (aged 80) Moscow, Soviet Union
- Allegiance: Soviet Union
- Branch: Red Army (Soviet Army from 1946)
- Service years: 1920–1952
- Rank: Lieutenant general
- Commands: 26th Rifle Division; 82nd Rifle Corps
- Conflicts: Russian Civil War; Second Sino-Japanese War; World War II
- Awards: Order of Lenin

Pavel Grigoryevich Kuznetsov (Russian: Павел Григорьевич Кузнецов; 24 December 1901 – 19 May 1982) was a Soviet Army lieutenant general who held divisional and corps command during World War II.

Conscripted into the Red Army during the Russian Civil War, Kuznetsov rose through command and staff positions during the interwar period and served as a military advisor in China during the Second Sino-Japanese War. Returning to the Soviet Union, he commanded the 26th Rifle Division from 1941 to 1943, but was relieved of command. Redeeming himself through performance as a brigade commander, Kuznetsov commanded the 82nd Rifle Corps during the Soviet advance through Ukraine and into the Balkans during 1943 and 1944. He continued to command the corps as part of the Soviet occupation force in Bulgaria for the rest of the war and served in the army until the early 1950s.

== Early life and Russian Civil War ==
Pavel Grigoryevich Kuznetsov was born on 24 December 1901 in the village of Lelyukhino, Monayensky volost, Belyovsky Uyezd, Tula Governorate. During the Russian Civil War, he was conscripted into the Red Army in March 1920 and served as a Red Army man in the 30th and 1st Reserve Rifle Regiments of the Moscow Military District at Yefremov and Moscow. In November he was enrolled as a cadet at the 4th Soviet Infantry Courses, redesignated the 8th Petrograd Infantry School in early 1921. With a detachment of cadets from the school, Kuznetsov took part in the suppression of the Kronstadt rebellion.

== Interwar period ==
During the last month of his training at the school, Kuznetsov commanded a cadet squad. Graduating in September 1922, he was appointed a squad leader in the 8th Separate Radio Battalion of the Western Front at Bryansk. In July 1924 he was transferred to the infantry and posted to the 109th Rifle Regiment of the 37th Rifle Division, part of the Western Military District (the Belorussian Military District from October 1926). With the regiment, Kuznetsov served as a platoon commander, assistant company commander and company commander.

Kuznetsov was admitted to the Frunze Military Academy in April 1930, and upon graduation in May 1933 appointed assistant chief of the 1st (operations) section of the staff of the 58th Rifle Division of the Ukrainian Military District at Cherkassy. He was transferred to Moscow to serve as chief of staff of the 3rd Rifle Regiment of the Moscow Proletarian Rifle Division in February 1934. By then a major, Kuznetsov served as assistant chief of staff of the 10th Rifle Corps at Voronezh from January 1938, and in March of that year became acting corps chief of staff. He was appointed chief of staff of the 19th Rifle Division of the Oryol Military District on 4 November 1938.

He was sent as a military advisor to China during the Second Sino-Japanese War between 14 May 1940 and 14 April 1941, serving as senior advisor to the commanders of the 3rd and 5th Military Regions. He took part in planning and execution of one army-level and two army group-level operations against the Japanese. Returning to the Soviet Union, Kuznetsov, then a colonel, was appointed commander of the 26th Rifle Division of the 1st Red Banner Army of the Far Eastern Front on 14 April 1941.

== World War II ==
After Germany invaded the Soviet Union, Kuznetsov continued to command the division at the station of Khorol in Primorsky Krai. In September the division was sent to the Northwestern Front, where it was assigned to the 11th Army and took part in defensive fighting on the approaches to Leningrad in the Valdai region and on the Novgorod axis. Until late 1941 the division defended the line east of Staraya Russa. Between January and May 1942 the division took part in the Demyansk offensive as part of the 34th Army from 25 December, returning to the 11th Army on 25 March. For his performance as division commander Kuznetsov was awarded the Order of the Red Banner on 3 May. Army commander Nikolai Berzarin's recommendation read:

Colonel Comrade Kuznetsov, in the battles to destroy the 290th Infantry Division of the enemy, showed himself to be a skillful leader and organizer of battle. In difficult conditions (swamp, almost roadless, aviation of the enemy) he was a personal example of urgency and daring to soldiers and commanders to destroy the enemy...In two days of fighting the units of Comrade Kuznetsov destroyed up to 1,000 Germans, knocked out three tanks...In the battles from 10 January to 19 February he showed himself to be a strong-willed and persistent commander.

He was positively assessed in a performance evaluation:

Kuznetsov is a tactically prepared commander, ably organizes the control of his subordinate units...He works to advance his professional knowledge.

The division was assigned to the 27th Army in June and transferred to the 11th Army in November, relocated to the Staraya Russa axis. With the latter, the division took part in the second Demyansk offensive in February 1943. During the operation, Kuznetsov was relieved of command on 22 February for "not coping with his duties."

Appointed commander of the 87th Separate Rifle Brigade, Kuznetsov led the brigade as it fought its way to the Lovat and took a bridgehead on the opposite bank, commanding it for seventeen days. He was appointed acting deputy chief of staff of the Northwestern Front for the auxiliary command post on 22 March, and was promoted to major general on 21 April. Kuznetsov took command of the 82nd Rifle Corps of the 34th Army on 17 July 1943. In September the corps was transferred to the 37th Army of the Steppe Front (the 2nd Ukrainian Front from 20 October). Kuznetsov led the corps in the Battle of the Dnieper in the region east of Kremenchug, the forcing of the Dnieper and capture of a bridgehead northeast of the village of Mishurin Rog. Between October and December the corps took part in offensive operations on the Krivoy Rog axis. For his command performance in the Battle of the Dnieper, Kuznetsov was awarded the Order of Suvorov, 2nd class, on 19 January 1944. The recommendation read:

In the offensive battles in which the corps, forcing a crossing of the Dnieper, established and expanded a bridgehead on its right bank, Major General Kuznetsov skillfully directed his troops.

In a difficult situation, waging intense battles, units of the corps under the command of Comrade Kuznetsov successfully accomplished the objective to expand the Dnieper bridgehead.

For skillful organization of the battle to expand the bridgehead, Major General Kuznetsov is recommended for the Order of Suvorov, 2nd class.

He was evaluated positively for his performance as corps commander:

Kuznetsov skillfully organized the offensive...made decisions quickly and correctly in difficult situations...as a result the units of the corps accomplished the objectives..."

In mid-January 1944, Kuznetsov's corps and its parent army were shifted to the 3rd Ukrainian Front. During the first months of 1944 he led the corps in the Nikopol–Krivoy Rog Offensive, the Bereznegovatoye–Snigirevka offensive and the Odessa Offensive. In these operations the corps fought over 350 kilometers, crossing the Ingulets, Ingul, Southern Bug and Dniester, taking part in the liberation of Krivoy Rog, Voznesensk and Tiraspol. For his performance in the Nikopol–Krivoy Rog offensive, Kuznetsov was recommended for a second Order of the Red Banner by army commander Mikhail Sharokhin, but this was downgraded to the Order of Kutuzov, 2nd class, which he was awarded on 19 March. The recommendation read:

In the offensive battles of the corps for the breakthrough of the strongly fortified zone of the enemy in the region northeast of Krivoy Rog and the capture of the city of Krivoy Rog, Major General Kuznetsov skillfully directed its troops.

Waging intense battles the units of the corps under the command of Major General Kuznetsov in four days of fighting broke through the strongly fortified defense zone of the enemy and, conducting offensive battles, took the city of Krivoy Rog on 22 February. In the offensive battles the divisions of the corps inflicted a serious defeat on the 15th and 62nd Infantry Divisions of the enemy...

For his skillful organization of the battle to break through the strongly fortified enemy defensive zone in the region northeast of Krivoy Rog and the capture of the city of Krivoy Rog, I recommend Major General Kuznetsov for the Order of the Red Banner.

In August Kuznetsov led the corps in the Jassy–Kishinev offensive, followed by the Soviet invasion of Bulgaria. He continued to command the corps as it served with the 37th Army, which remained in Bulgaria as an occupation force for the rest of the war. For his command performance in the Jassy–Kishinev offensive, Kuznetsov was awarded the Order of Bogdan Khmelnitsky on 13 September. The same day, he was promoted to the rank of lieutenant general.

== Postwar ==
After the end of the war, Kuznetsov continued to command the corps in the Southern Group of Forces. He was placed at the disposal of the Main Cadre Directorate in October 1945, completing the Higher Academic Courses at the Voroshilov Higher Military Academy between March 1946 and March 1947. Upon graduation, Kuznetsov was appointed deputy chief of the Directorate of Military Training Institutions of the Rifle Troops of the Ministry of the Armed Forces. He was transferred to the reserve on 20 May 1952. In retirement, Kuznetsov wrote his memoirs and authored several military history works, including a history of the Moscow Proletarian Rifle Division that he served with in the 1930s and biographies of Fyodor Tolbukhin and Ivan Chernyakhovsky. He died in Moscow on 18 May 1982.

== Awards ==
Kuznetsov was a recipient of the following awards:

- Order of Lenin
- Order of the Red Banner (3)
- Order of Suvorov, 2nd class
- Order of Kutuzov, 2nd class
- Order of Bogdan Khmelnitsky, 2nd class
- Order of Saint Alexander, 1st class with swords
- Medals
