= 26th Rifle Division =

- Active: 3 November 1918–1952
- Country: Soviet Union
- Branch: Red Army (1918–1946); Soviet Army (1946–1952)
- Type: Infantry
- Size: Division
- Nickname(s): 26th Zlatoust Red Banner Order of Suvorov Rifle Division
- Engagements: Russian Civil War World War II: Demyansk Pocket; Leningrad-Novgorod offensive; Riga offensive; East Prussian Offensive; Battle of Königsberg; Samland Offensive
- Decorations: Honorary Revolutionary Red Banner; Order of Suvorov
- Battle honours: Zlatoust; Stalin

Commanders
- Notable commanders: Vasily Shorin Mikhail Matiyasevich; Yan Gaylit; Genrich Eiche Kornily Cherepanov

The 26th Rifle Division was a rifle division in the Soviet Red Army during the Russian Civil War, World War II and the Cold War. The division was formed on 3 November 1918 on the Eastern Front (China Border), sent to the Soviet-German Front in August 1941. Ended the war in Poland, where it was assigned to the Northern Group of Forces. It was disbanded in 1952.

== Russian Civil War ==
The division was formed on the Eastern Front in November 1918. It fought the entire civil war period on the eastern front and ended the war on the Chinese border. The division remained there until 1929 when it moved to the coastal region.

=== Composition ===
- 76th Rifle Regiment
- 77th Rifle Regiment
- 78th Rifle Regiment
- 26th Artillery Regiment

== World War II ==
Assigned to the 1st Red Banner Army at the start of the World War II, the division was ordered west in August 1941. Assigned to the Northwestern Front's 11th Army upon arrival. The division spent 1942 through September 1944 assigned to Northwestern or 2nd Baltic Fronts 11th, 27th, 34th, 1st Shock, and 22nd Armies. During this time the division took part in the Demyansk Army Group offensive operation (1st phase) from 7 January to 20 May 1942 and second phase from 15 to 28 February 1943. It also fought in the Leningrad-Novgorod Strategic Offensive's Staraya Russa-Novorzhev Offensive from 18 February 1944 to 1 March 1944.

In September 1944 the division was reassigned to the 43rd Army's 90th Rifle Corps of the 1st Baltic Front. The army was reassigned to the 3rd Belorussian Front in January 1945 where it remained assigned for the remainder of the war. In the last part of the war the division participated in the Baltic Strategic Offensive's Riga Army Group offensive from 14 September to 24 October 1944 and the East Prussian Offensive's Insterburg–Königsberg Offensive, Königsberg Offensive, and Zemland Offensive.

=== Composition ===
- 87th Rifle Regiment (formerly the 76th Rifle Regiment)
- 312th Rifle Regiment (formerly the 77th Rifle Regiment) (awarded the Honorific Designation “Novgorod”)
- 349th Rifle Regiment (formerly the 78th Rifle Regiment)
- 19th Artillery Regiment (formerly the 26th Artillery Regiment)
- 62nd Separate Antitank Artillery Battalion
- 459th Mortar Regiment (from 27.10.1941 to 19.10.1942)
- 67th Reconnaissance Company
- 9th Sapper Battalion
- 70th Separate Signals Battalion (formally 820th Sep. Signals Company)
- 30th Medical Battalion
- 29th Decontamination Company
- 52nd Auto-Transport Company (formally 150th and 479th Auto-Transport Company)
- 78th Field Bakery
- 59th Veterinary Field Hospital (formally 196th Veterinary Field Hospital)
- 20th Divisional Artillery Workshop Battalion
- 171st Field Postal Station (formally 8812th Field Postal Station)
- 261st Field Cash Office of the State Bank

== Post war ==
The division was assigned to the Northern Group of Forces after the war and remained in Poland. In June 1946 it became part of the 132nd Rifle Corps, replacing the disbanded 18th Rifle Division. It became part of the 18th Rifle Corps and was based at Wrocław between 1946 and 1948. The division disbanded along with its corps in 1952.

== Commanders ==
- Mikhail Matiyasevich (3.11.1918 — 26.03.1919)
- Yan Gaylit (26.03.1919 — 16.04.1919)
- Genrich Eiche (16.04.1919 — 10.08.1919)
- S. M. Beliitsky (10.08.1919 - 8.09.1919)
- I. F. Blazevich (8.09.1919 - 10.09.1919), acting
- S. M. Beliitsky (10.09.1919 - 21.09.1919)
- Genrich Eiche (21.09.1919 - 23.11.1919)
- A. M. Volpe (23.11.1919 - 25.11.1919), acting
- Yan Gaylit (25.11.1919 - 26.10.1921)
- Pyotr Filatov (November 1925–February 1927)
- Konstantin Pashkovsky (1929-1931)
- Grigory Iusstinovich (1931-1937)
- Nikolai Glovatsky (1937-1938)
- Colonel Pavel Grigoryevich Kuznetsov, 14 April 1941 - 22 February 1943
- Colonel Kornily Cherepanov, 23 February 1943 - 25 September 1944
- General-major Vasilii Andreevich Belonogov, 26 September 1944 - 21 April 1945
- Colonel Nikolai Ivanovich Krasnov, 22 April 1945 - 9 May 1945

== Sources ==
- Michael Avanzini; Craig Crofoot (1 October 2004). Armies of the Bear. Tiger Lily Publications LLC. ISBN 978-0-9720296-2-9.
- Feskov, V.I.; Golikov, V.I.; Kalashnikov, K.A.; Slugin, S.A. (2013). Вооруженные силы СССР после Второй Мировой войны: от Красной Армии к Советской [The Armed Forces of the USSR after World War II: From the Red Army to the Soviet: Part 1 Land Forces] (in Russian). Tomsk: Scientific and Technical Literature Publishing. ISBN 9785895035306.
