= Mikhail Matiyasevich =

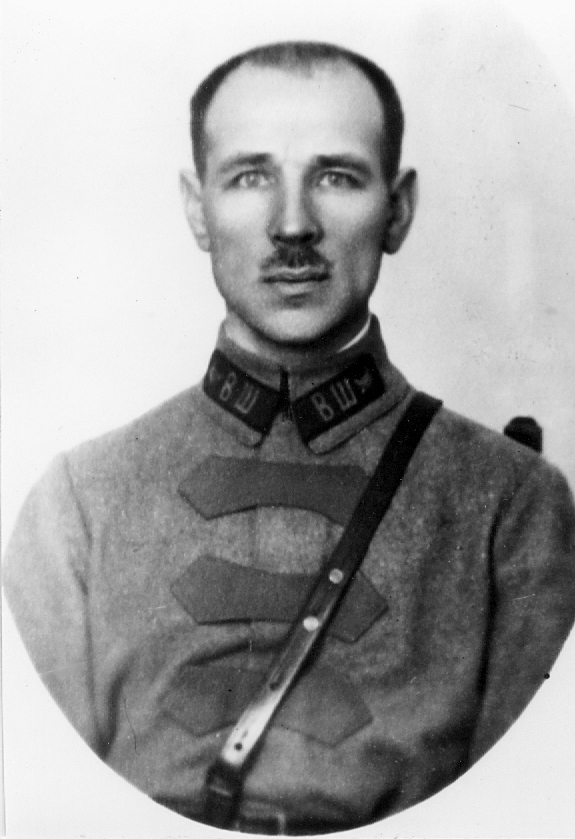
Mikhail Stepanovich Matiyasevich.

Mikhail Stepanovich Matiyasevich (Matiasevich) (May 23 [June 4], 1878, in Smolensk – August 5, 1941, in Kyiv) was a Soviet military commander, who commanded several military units of the Red Army during the Russian Civil War.

== Biography ==
From the nobility of the Smolensk province, he fought in the Russo-Japanese War, as a lieutenant in the 220th Infantry Regiment. In the First World War, he fought on the Western and Northern fronts and he was wounded four times. Having become a Colonel in July 1916, he commanded the 717th Infantry Regiment. In the days of the October Revolution, he was unanimously elected by the soldiers as regimental commander. In February of 1918, he was demobilized, and apparently for ideological reasons, he voluntarily joined the Red Army in April 1918.

He fought in the Russian civil war of 1918–1920 initially at the head of the 1st Smolensk Infantry Division, and then as commander of the right group of the 5th Army around Kazan. Then, from November 14, 1918, to April of 1919, he served at the head of the 26th Rifle Division.

On July 1, 1919, he became Commander of the 7th Army and defended Petrograd against the White Northwestern Army of General Yudenich.

Following his defense of Petrograd, he was ordered to the Eastern Front. There the Red Army appointed him Commander of the 3rd Army on October 7, 1919. The 3rd Army pursued Admiral Kolchak and his soldiers as they retreated.

After the capture of Omsk, the 3rd Army was disbanded, and the 30th and 51st Divisions were transferred to the 5th Army. From February 8, 1920, to August 29, 1921, he was Commander of the East Siberian Military District and the 5th Army, which destroyed the remains of Kolchak's troops, as well as the Asian Division of Roman von Ungern-Sternberg.

After the war, he lectured at several schools, including the Taras Shevchenko National University of Kyiv, until he was arrested in 1931. He was sentenced to 10 years' detention in a workcamp but was released 2 years later. Again arrested in 1937, he was released in 1940 "for lack of evidence". He died in Kyiv in August 1941, a month before its occupation by the Germans, aged 63. He was buried in the Lukyaniv cemetery of Kyiv.
