= 82nd Rifle Corps =

Unit of the Red Army and later the Soviet Army

- Active: July 1943–June 1955
- Country: Soviet Union
- Branch: Red Army (Soviet Army from 1946)
- Type: Infantry (Rifle corps)
- Engagements: World War II

The 82nd Rifle Corps (Russian: 82-й стрелковый корпус) was a rifle corps of the Red Army and later the Soviet Army.

Formed in mid-1943, the corps served with the 37th Army during most of World War II. It fought in the advance southwest from the Dnieper and into Romania and Bulgaria until August 1944. After the advance to Bulgaria it remained there on garrison duty for the rest of the war. Postwar, the corps transferred to the Odessa Military District, where it was renumbered as the 25th Rifle Corps in 1955.

== World War II ==
The corps was formed as part of the 34th Army of the Northwestern Front on 15 July 1943 under the command of Major General Pavel Kuznetsov, who led it for the rest of the war. It initially existed as a headquarters without assigned troops, and transferred to the Reserve of the Supreme High Command in August with the 1st and 10th Guards Airborne Divisions. In September it was transferred to the 37th Army of the Steppe Front (the 2nd Ukrainian Front from 20 October), being reinforced by the 188th Rifle Division. The corps fought in the capture of Left-bank Ukraine east of Kremenchuk, then crossed the Dnieper and captured a bridgehead northwest of Mishurin Rog during the Battle of the Dnieper. Between October and December it attacked towards Krivoi Rog. The 1st Guards Airborne was replaced by the 89th Guards Rifle Division in October, and the latter was replaced by the 28th Guards Rifle Division the following month. The 15th Guards Rifle Division replaced the 10th Guards Airborne in January 1944.

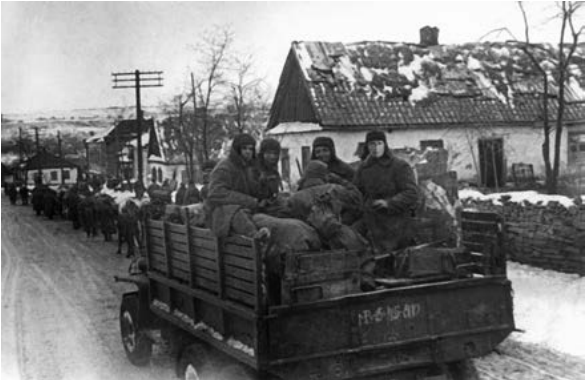
Soviet troops entering Krivoy Rog in February 1944

Transferred to the 3rd Ukrainian Front with the army in mid-January, the corps fought in the advance into Right-bank Ukraine during the Dnieper–Carpathian Offensive, participating in the Nikopol–Krivoi Rog Offensive, the Bereznegovatoye–Snigirevka Offensive, and the Odessa Offensive. In these operations it advanced 350 kilometers, crossing the Inhulets, Inhul, Southern Bug, and Dniester while helping to capture the cities of Krivoi Rog, Voznesensk, and Tiraspol. The 10th Guards Airborne briefly returned to the corps in February and the 15th Guards left it in March. The 10th Guards Airborne was replaced by the 92nd Guards Rifle Division in April; the corps would include the 28th and 92nd Guards and the 188th for the rest of the war. The 82nd fought in the Jassy–Kishinev Offensive and the advance into Bulgaria in August. This was its last combat action, as it spent the rest of the war on garrison duty in Bulgaria.

== Postwar ==
On 10 June 1945, the 82nd became part of the Southern Group of Forces along with the rest of the 37th Army, when the 3rd Ukrainian Front was redesignated. By spring 1946, the corps had been relocated to Odessa in the Odessa Military District. The corps included the 34th Guards Mechanized Division (the former 92nd Guards Rifle Division) at Mykolaiv, the 28th Guards Rifle Division at Odessa, and the 188th Rifle Division at Voznesensk. The latter was soon transferred to Zaporizhia, where it became the 52nd Separate Rifle Brigade. By 1955, its headquarters had moved to Mykolaiv in the same district. In accordance with a General Staff directive of 4 March 1955 and a Ministry of Defense order of 13 June, the corps was renumbered as the 25th Rifle Corps. The latter was subsequently redesignated as the 25th Army Corps.

== Commanders ==
The following officers are known to have commanded the corps:

- Major General Pavel Kuznetsov (promoted to Lieutenant General 13 September 1944; 15 July 1943–December 1945)
- Major General Afanasy Gryaznov (December 1945–May 1946)
- Lieutenant General Dmitry Kupriyanov (May 1946–18 August 1948)
- Lieutenant General Mikhail Moskalik (18 August 1948–18 March 1949)
- Lieutenant General Georgy Bukhovets (18 March 1949–July 1952)
- Lieutenant General Pyotr Fomenko (July 1952–4 June 1956)
