= Kiev Fortified Region =

Fortified district of the Soviet Union

- Kiev, Ukraine
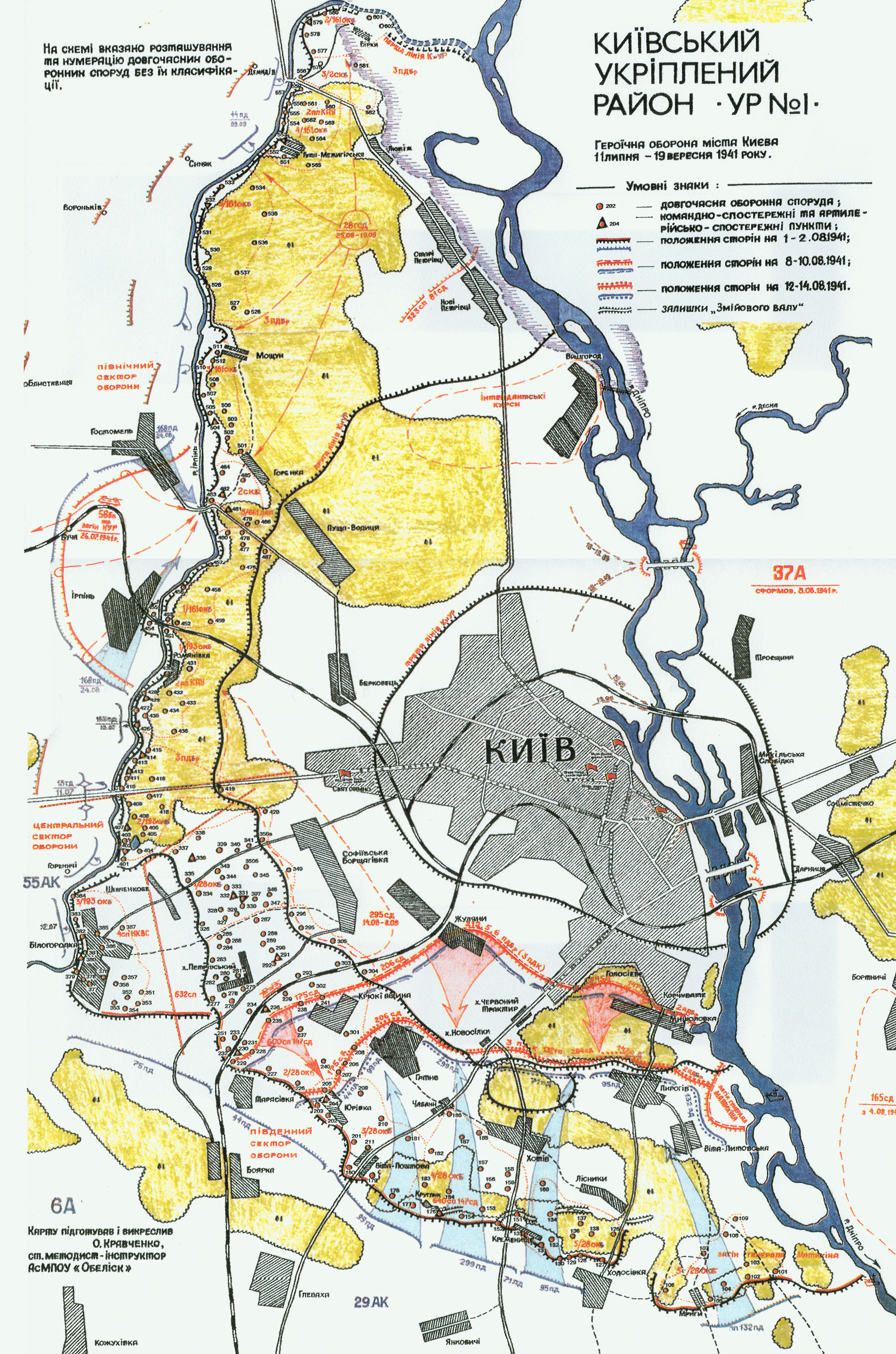
- Map of Kiev fortified. Author O. Kravchenko.

Site information
- Type: Fortified Region

Site history
- Built: 1929–1941

Immovable Monument of Local Significance of Ukraine
- Official name: Комплекс військово-інженерних споруд Київського укріпрайону (Complex of military engineering structures of the Kyiv Fortified Region)
- Type: History
- Reference no.: 513-Кв

The Kiev Fortified Region (Russian abbreviation КиУР, УР-1, 1-й укреплённый район, 1-й укрепрайон) is a fortified district in the Kyiv area, a complex of defensive structures, consisting of permanent and field fortifications and engineering obstacles. It was built in the period from 1929 to 1941 for the protection of the old border of the USSR. The total length of the fortified region is about 85 km between the flanks, which are anchored on the river Dnieper, and the depth of the defensive zone ranges from 1 to 6 km.

The fortifications had a significant impact in the fighting for the defence of the city in 1941.

== Initial construction ==
According to Order No 90 of the Revolutionary Military Council of the USSR, dated 19 March 1928, a program of fortifications on the country's borders was to be carried out, and in 1928, construction began on the first thirteen fortified regions, including Kiev.

Building started in 1929. The defence zone was identified, and in it were built 120 long-term machine gun emplacements and 45 artillery observation and observation points in a construction program lasting 4 years, from 1929 to 1933. But in 1932, further construction of the fortified area was discontinued.

== Second World War ==
After the annexation of the Poland's eastern territories in 1939, Stalin wanted to push the Soviet defences up to the new borders, creating a series of new fortified regions. The old defences of the Stalin Line were neglected. Only in June 1940 did Stalin finally agree with Zhukov that the old Stalin Line should be partially manned, but the troops found the fortifications 'overgrown with grass' and completely lacking in fixed defences. The poor state of the Kiev defences was not unknown to the Soviet leadership: a NKVD report from 1939 stated that 'Only 5 of the 257 structures in the area were prepared for combat' and went on to list a host of deficiencies ranging from uncleared forests limiting fields of fire, no communication or support equipment, and old seals which had decayed. The report went on to state that although the deficiencies had been reported, nothing had been done about them. Restoration of the Kiev fortified area began on June 24, 1941, when the commander of the Southwestern Front, Mikhail Kirponos, gave an order for the rehabilitation of the fortified area, including equipping and arming the pillboxes and the construction of field fortifications. For these tasks, the population of Kiev was mobilized. By 30 June 50,000 people were involved in the construction, by 2 July 160,000; in the last days of construction, 200,000 workers were involved.

Since the original construction had not anticipated tank attack, no specific measures had been incorporated into the defence system. To eliminate this drawback, 30 km and 15 km long anti-tank ditches were dug. Also installed were metal hedgehogs and anti-personnel obstacles, among them 16 km of electrified barbed wire and a large number of minefields.

By early July, the German advance had punched a hole in the centre of the Southern Front's defences, and on 9 July, thinking that Kiev was there for the taking, General von Kleist issued orders for III Panzer Corps to capture the city and establish a deep bridgehead east of the Dnieper.

There are reports that the 37th Army drew some of its initial staff from the Fortified Region staff.

== Pictures ==
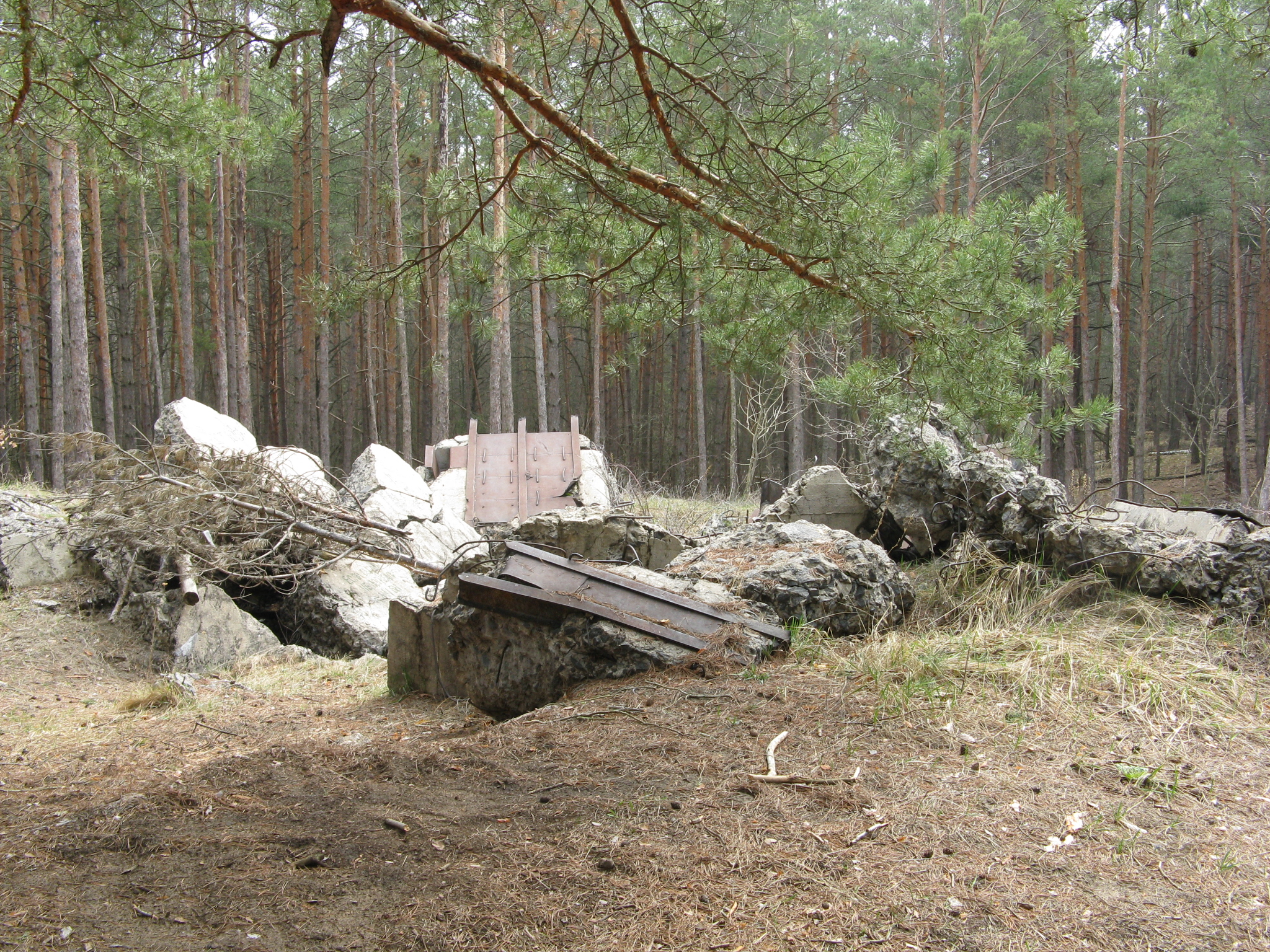
Pillbox 108

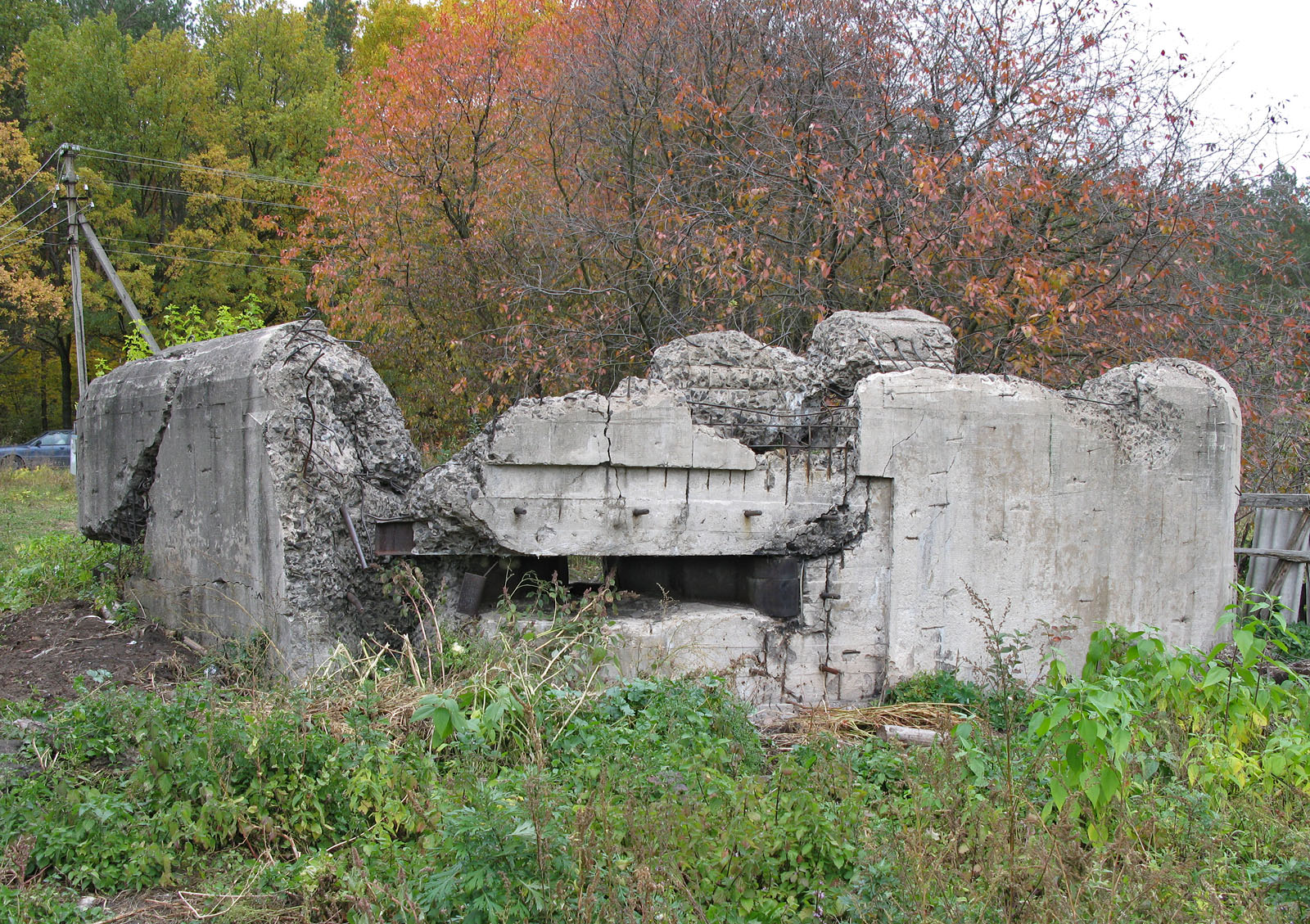
Pillbox 133

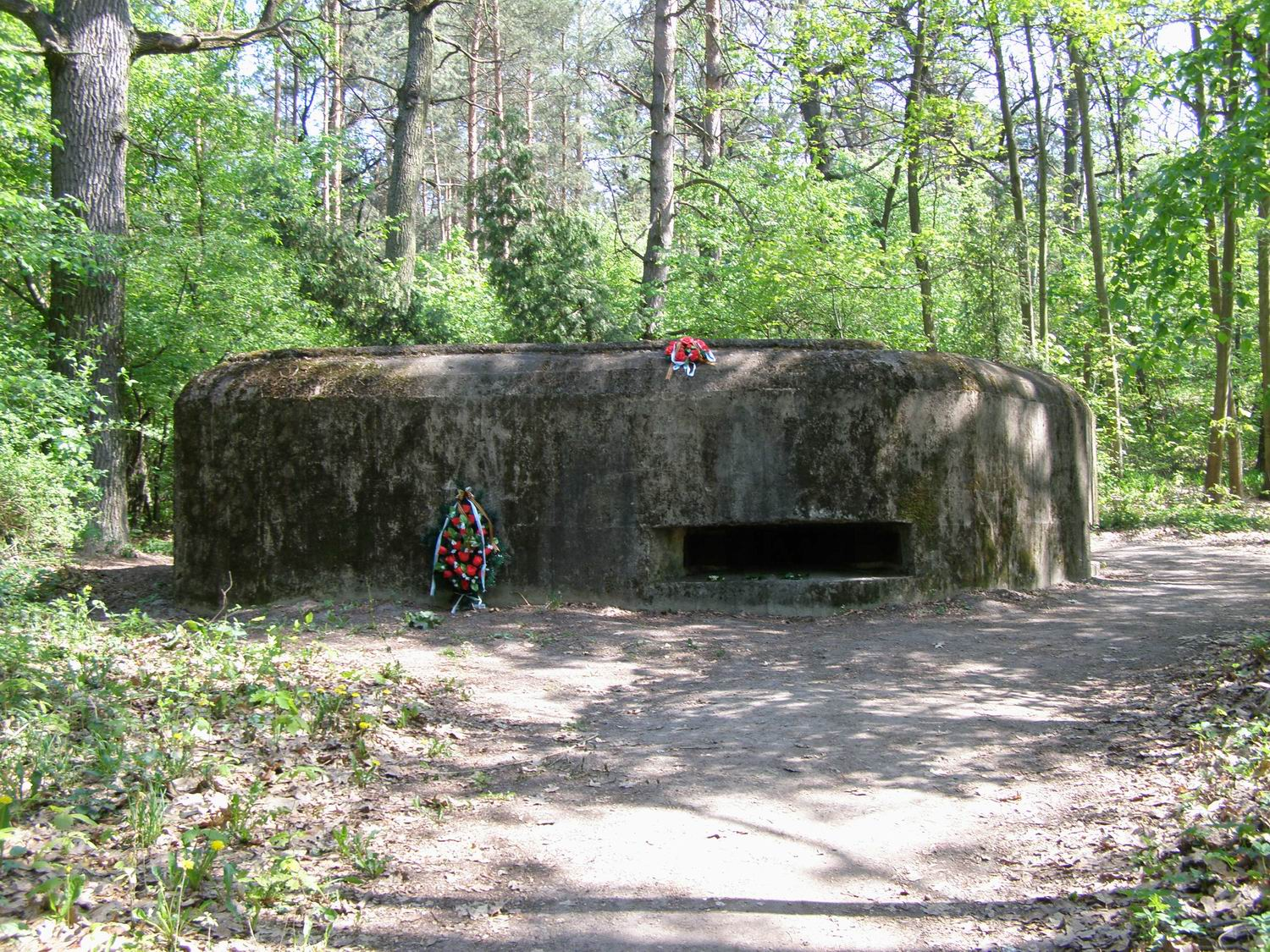
Pillbox 178

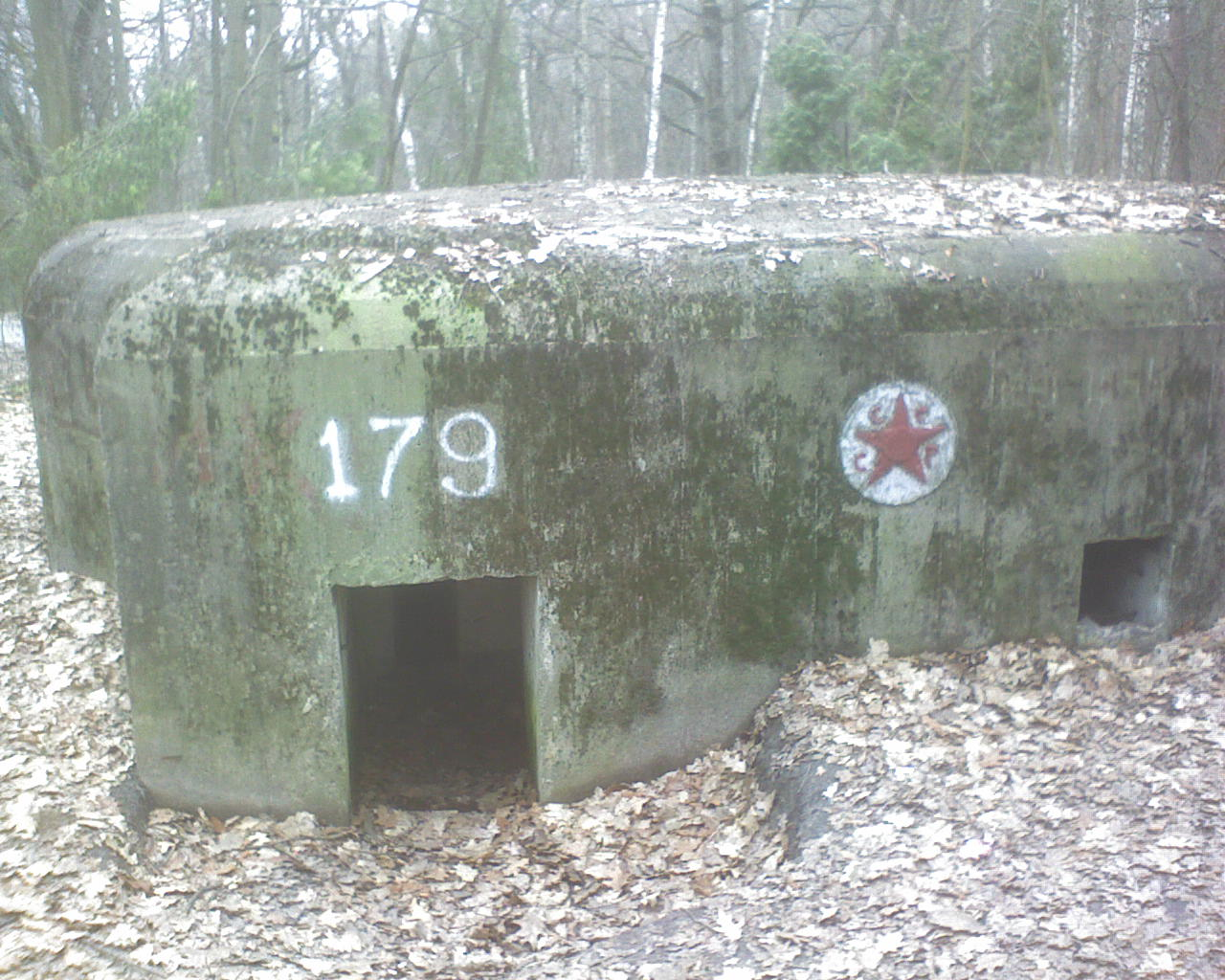
Pillbox 178. The number «179» was mistakenly added in the postwar period.

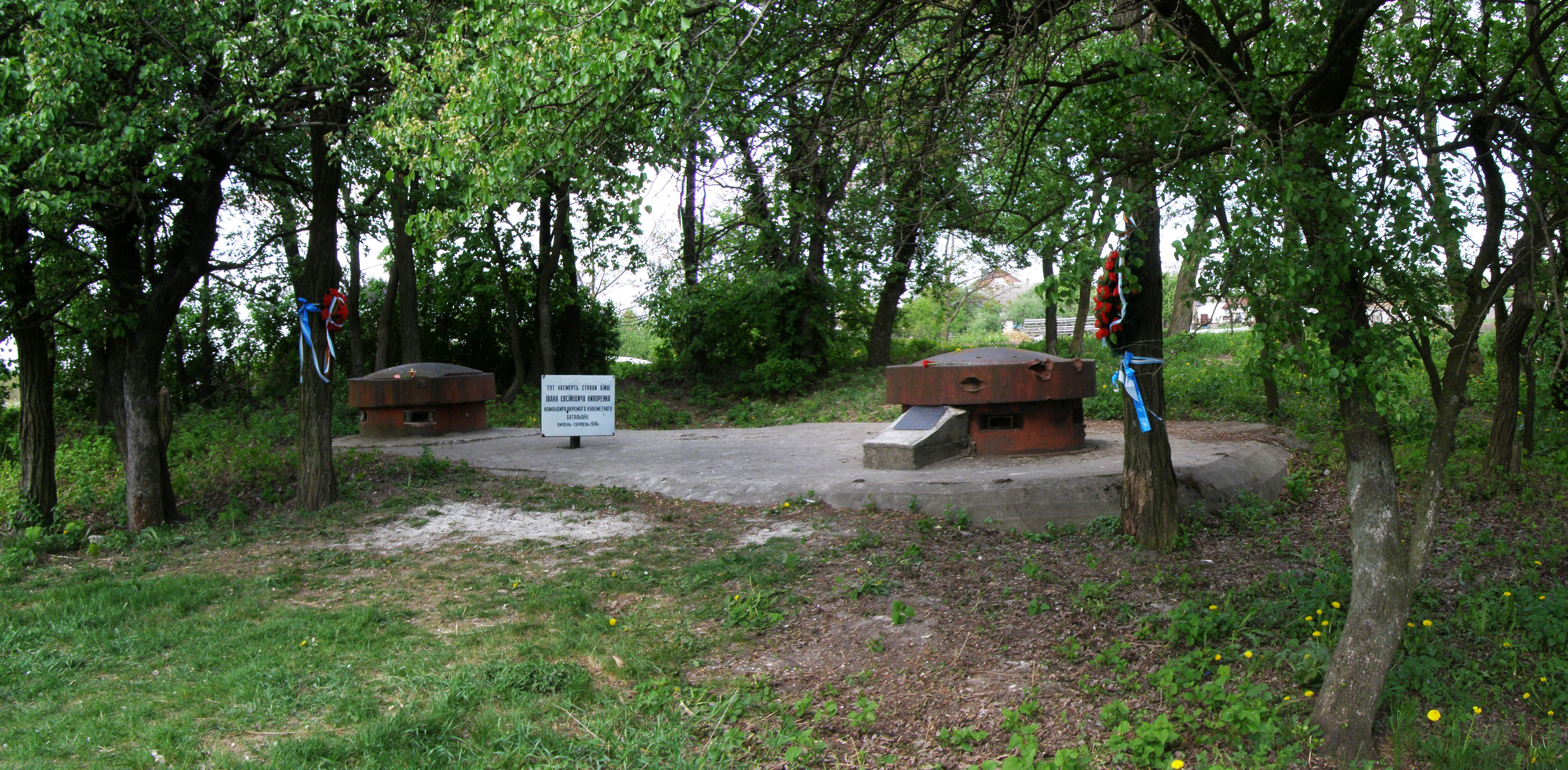
Pillbox 204

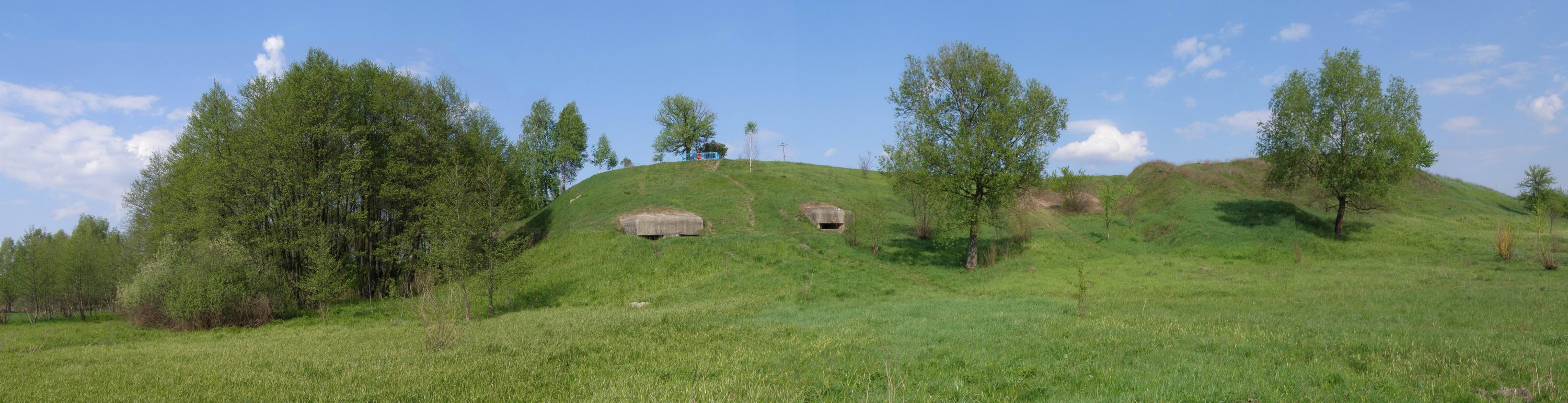
Pillbox 205

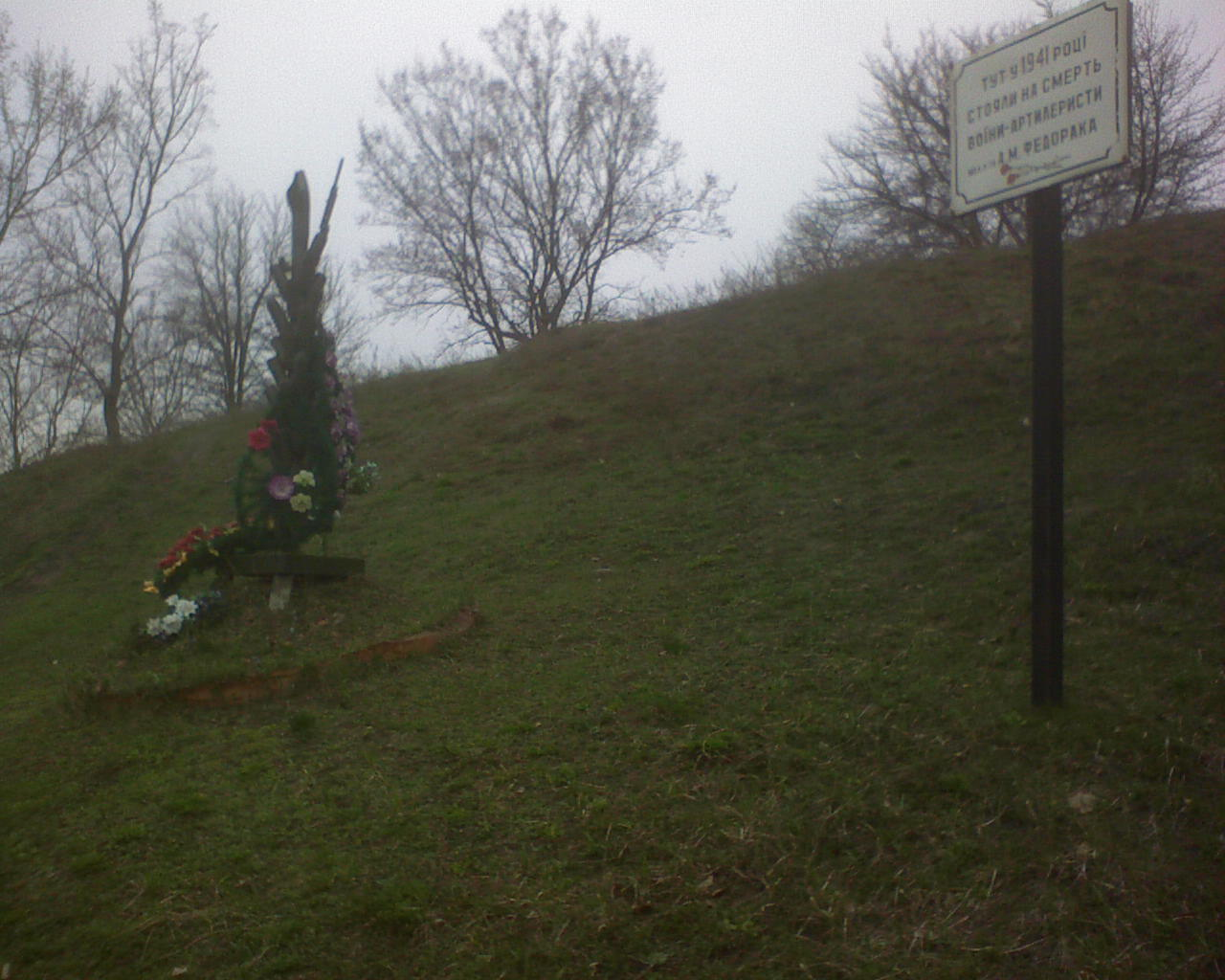
Pillbox 211

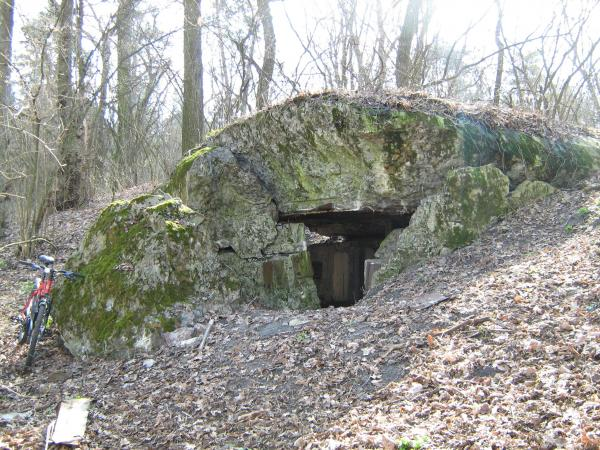
Pillbox 408

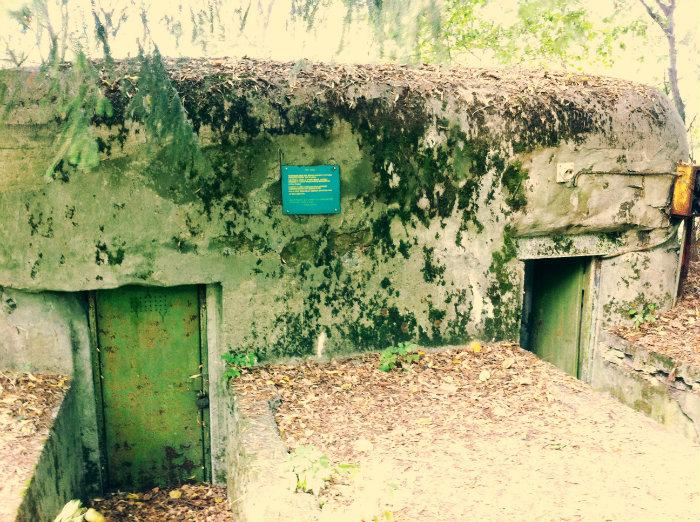
Pillbox 413

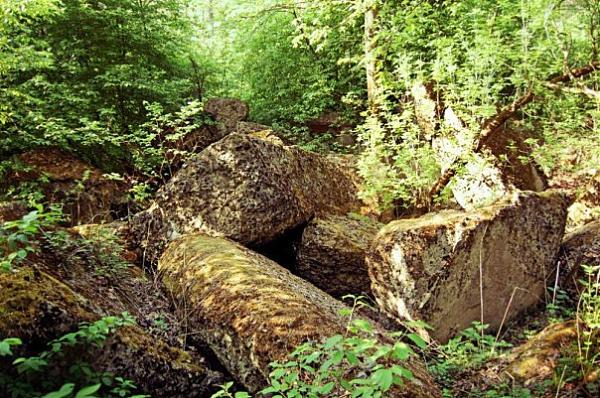
Pillbox 416

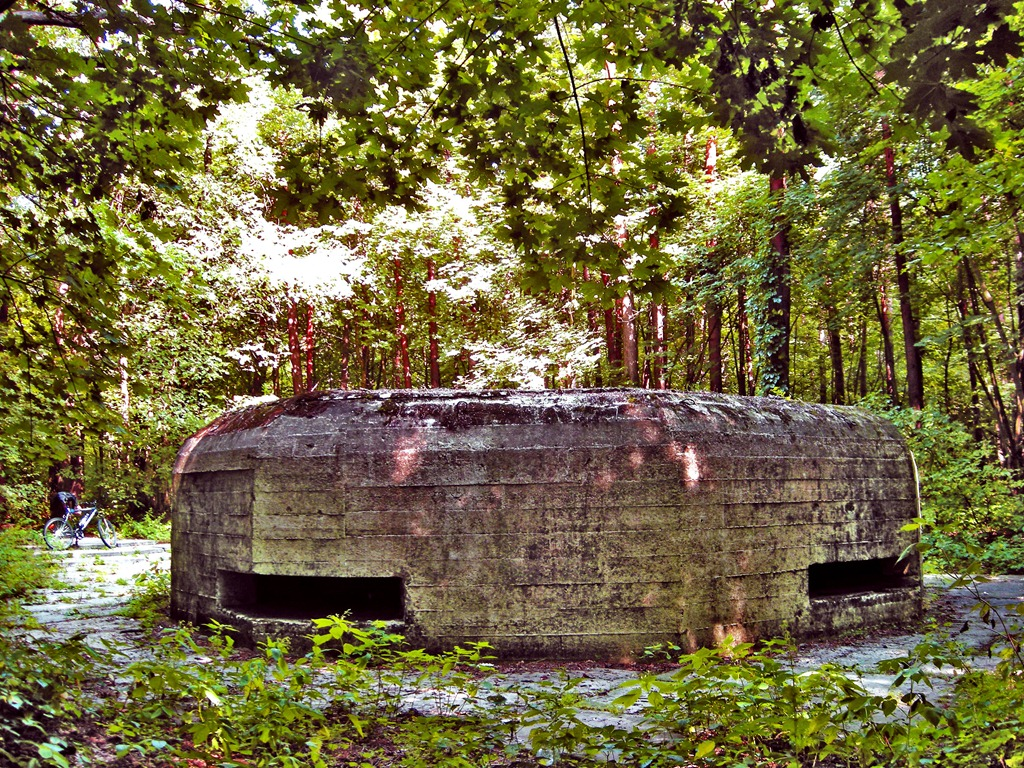
Pillbox 417

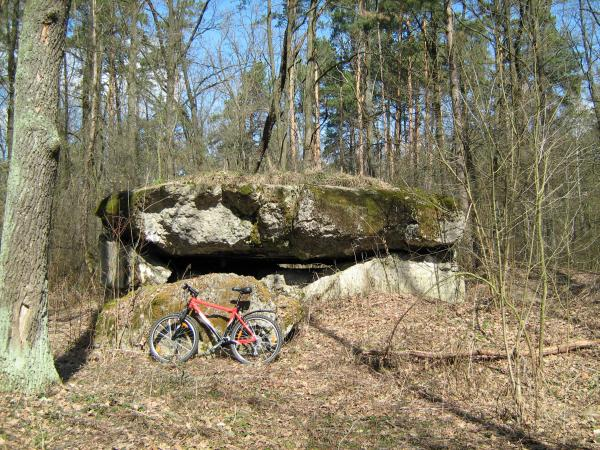
Pillbox 418

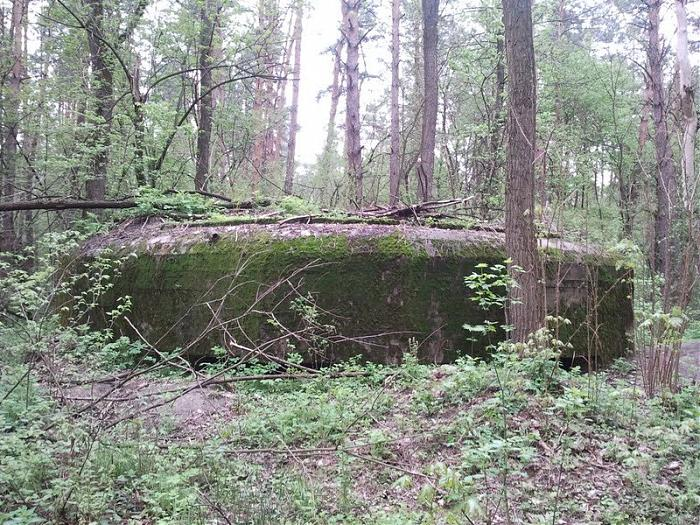
Pillbox 419

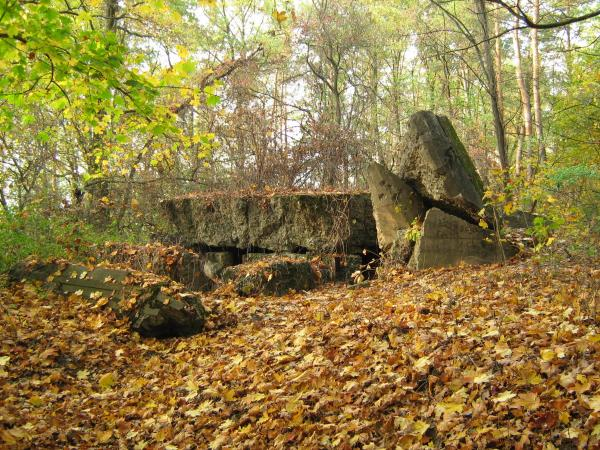
Pillbox 426

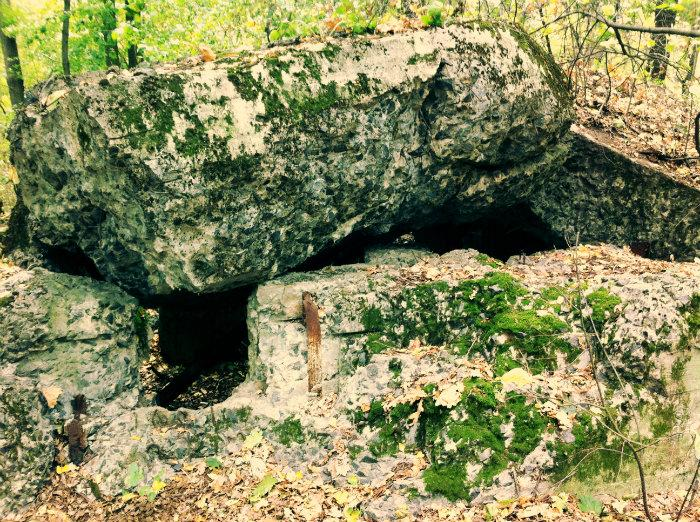
Pillbox 427

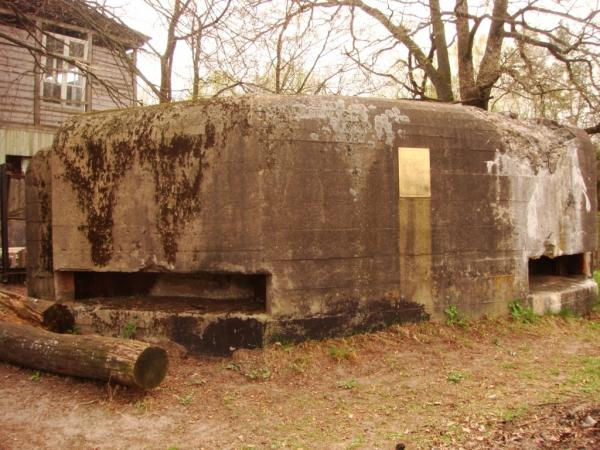
Pillbox 428

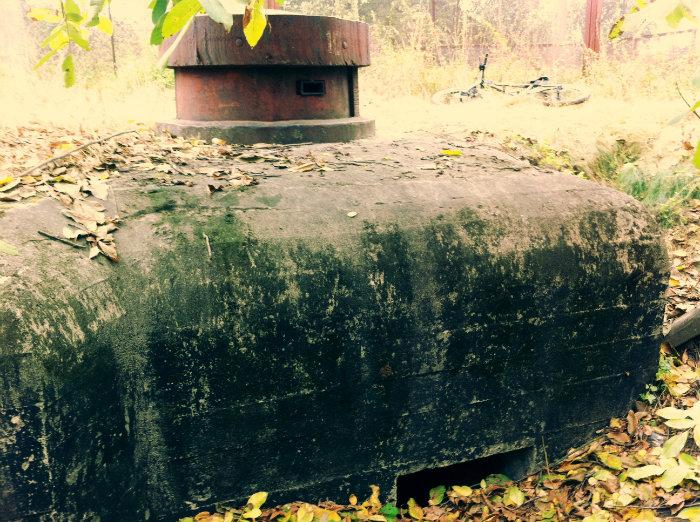
Pillbox 429

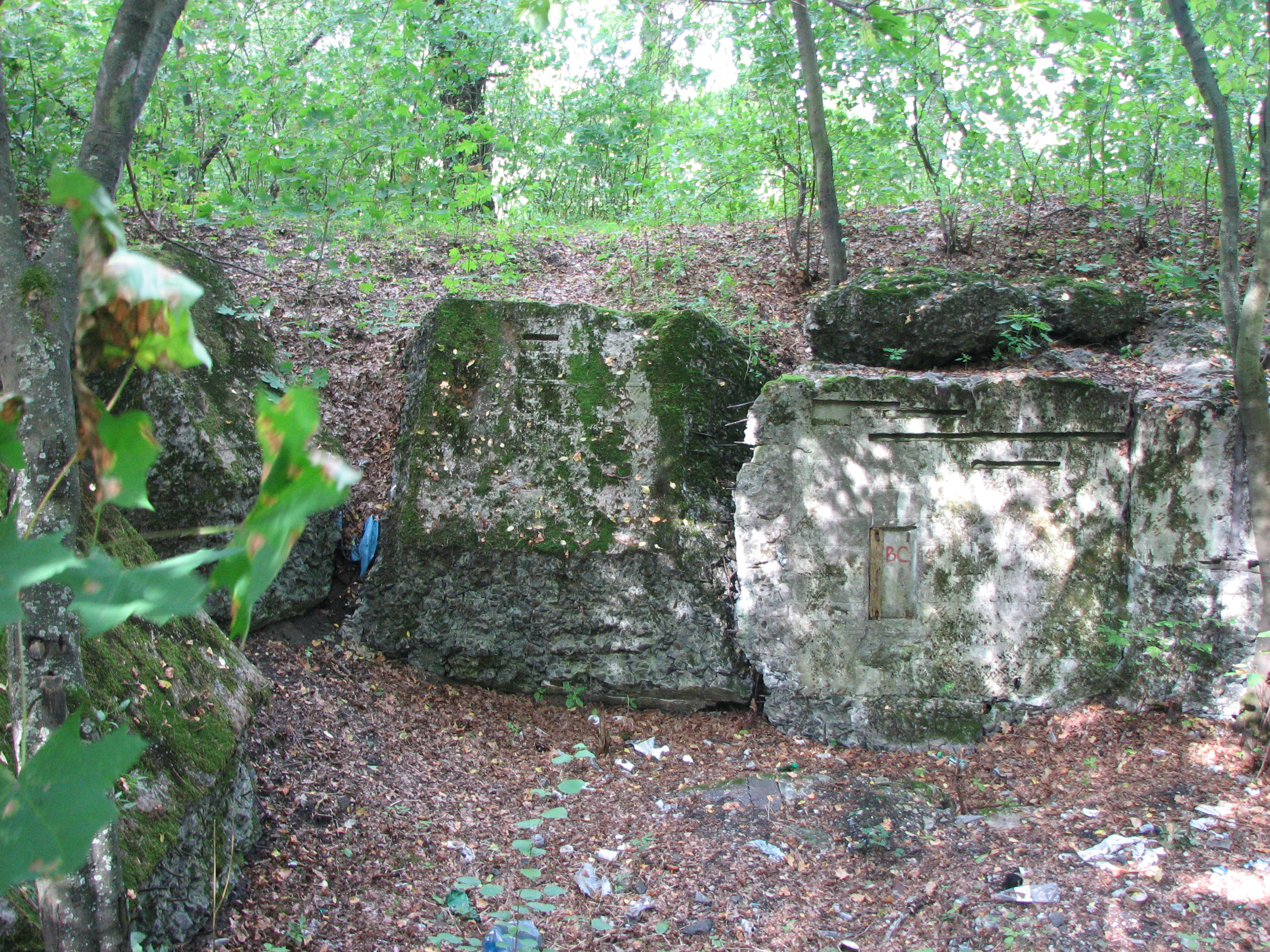
Pillbox 453

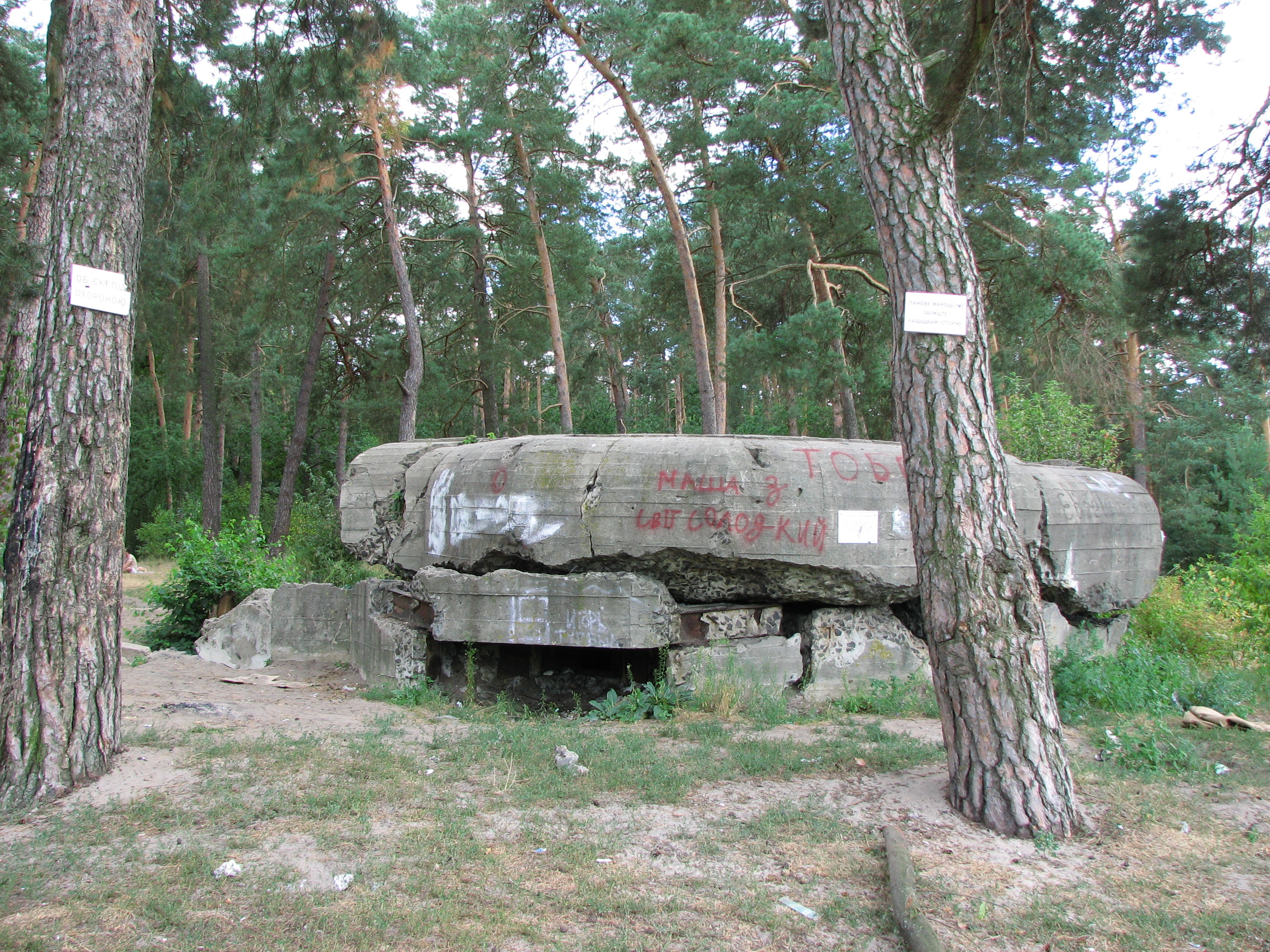
Pillbox 456

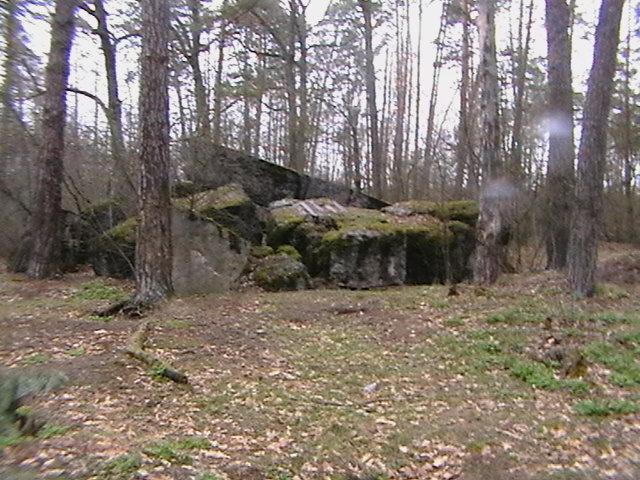
Pillbox 457

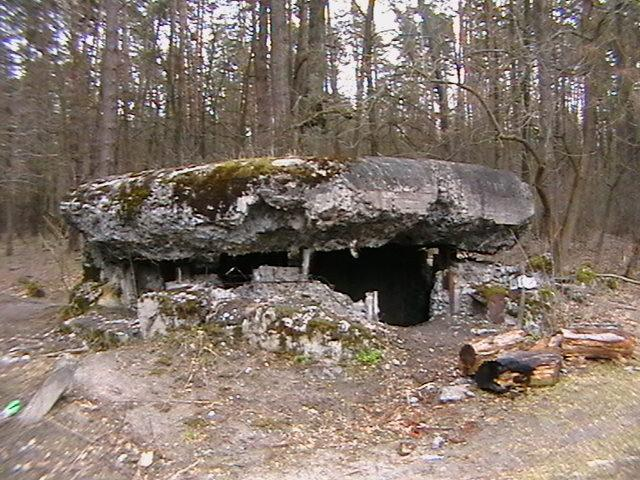
Pillbox 458

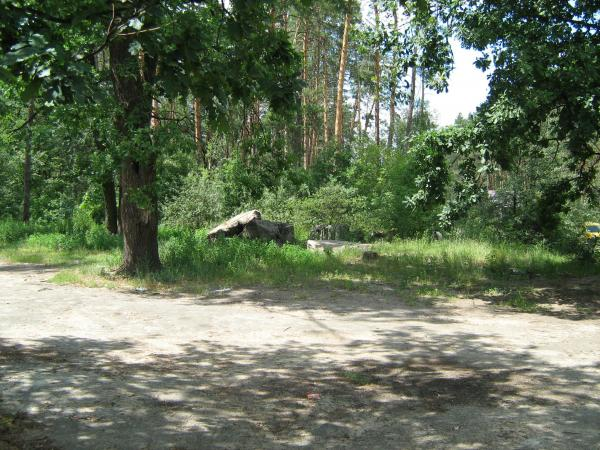
Pillbox 478

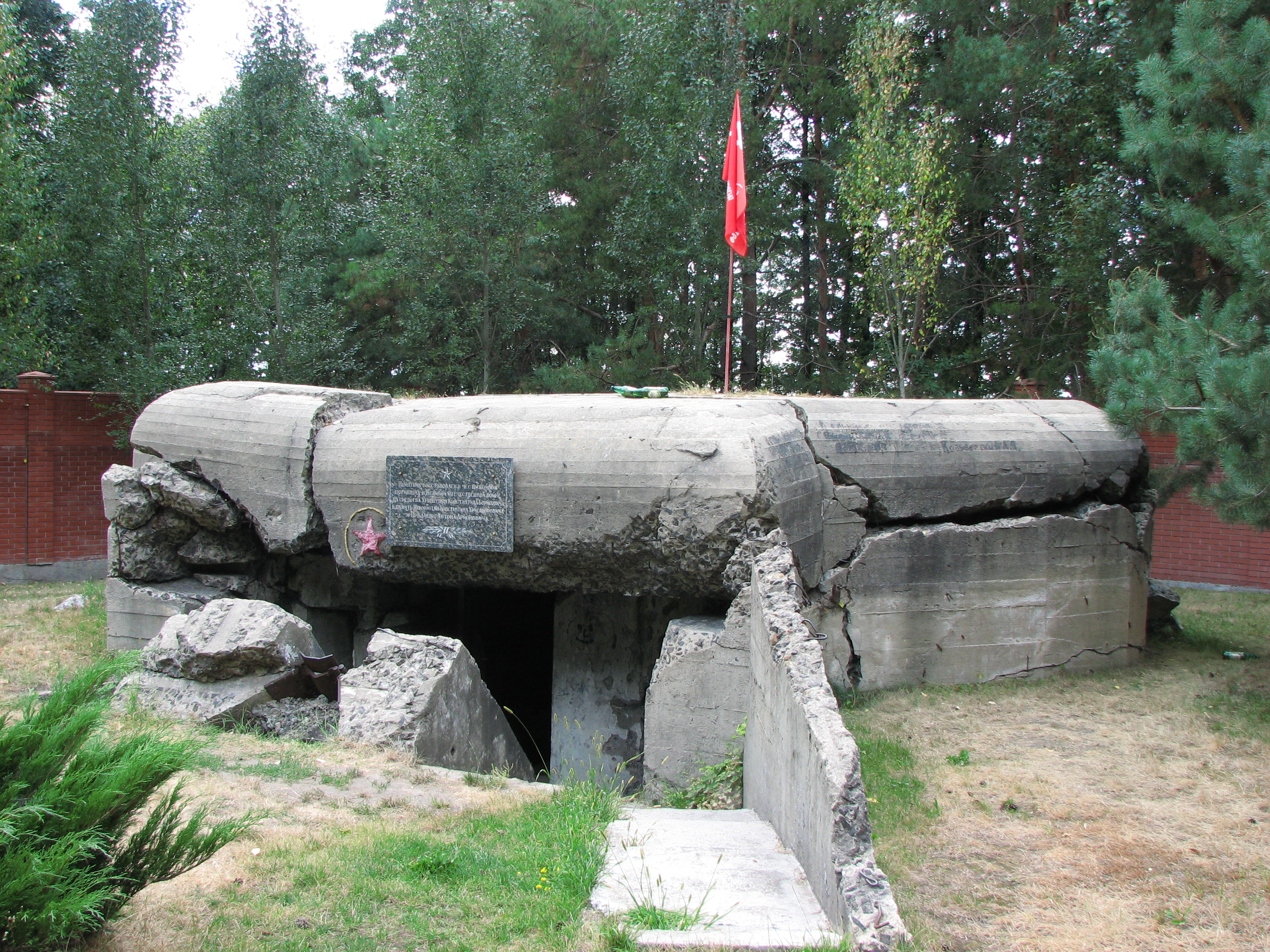
Pillbox 480

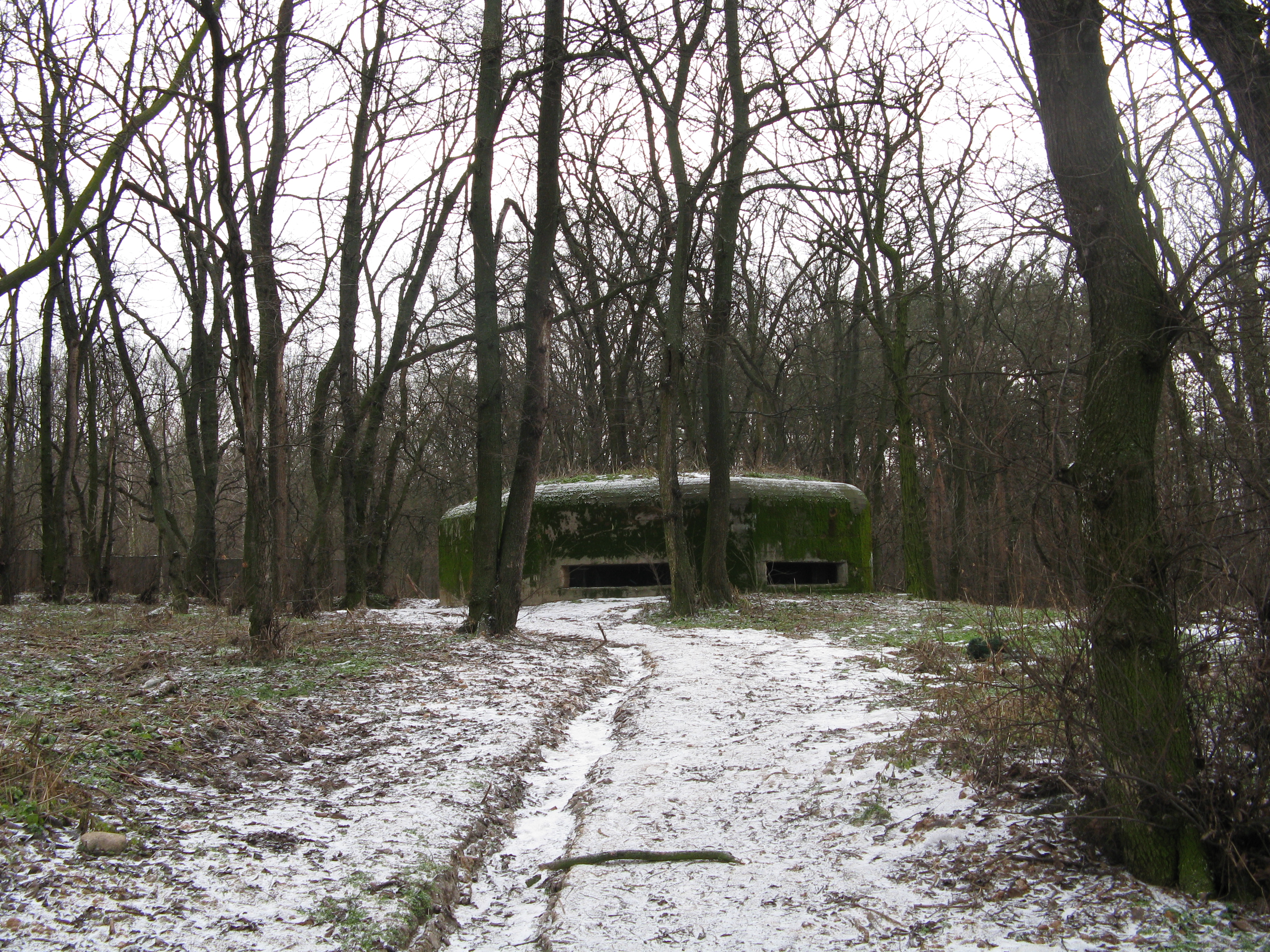
Pillbox 481

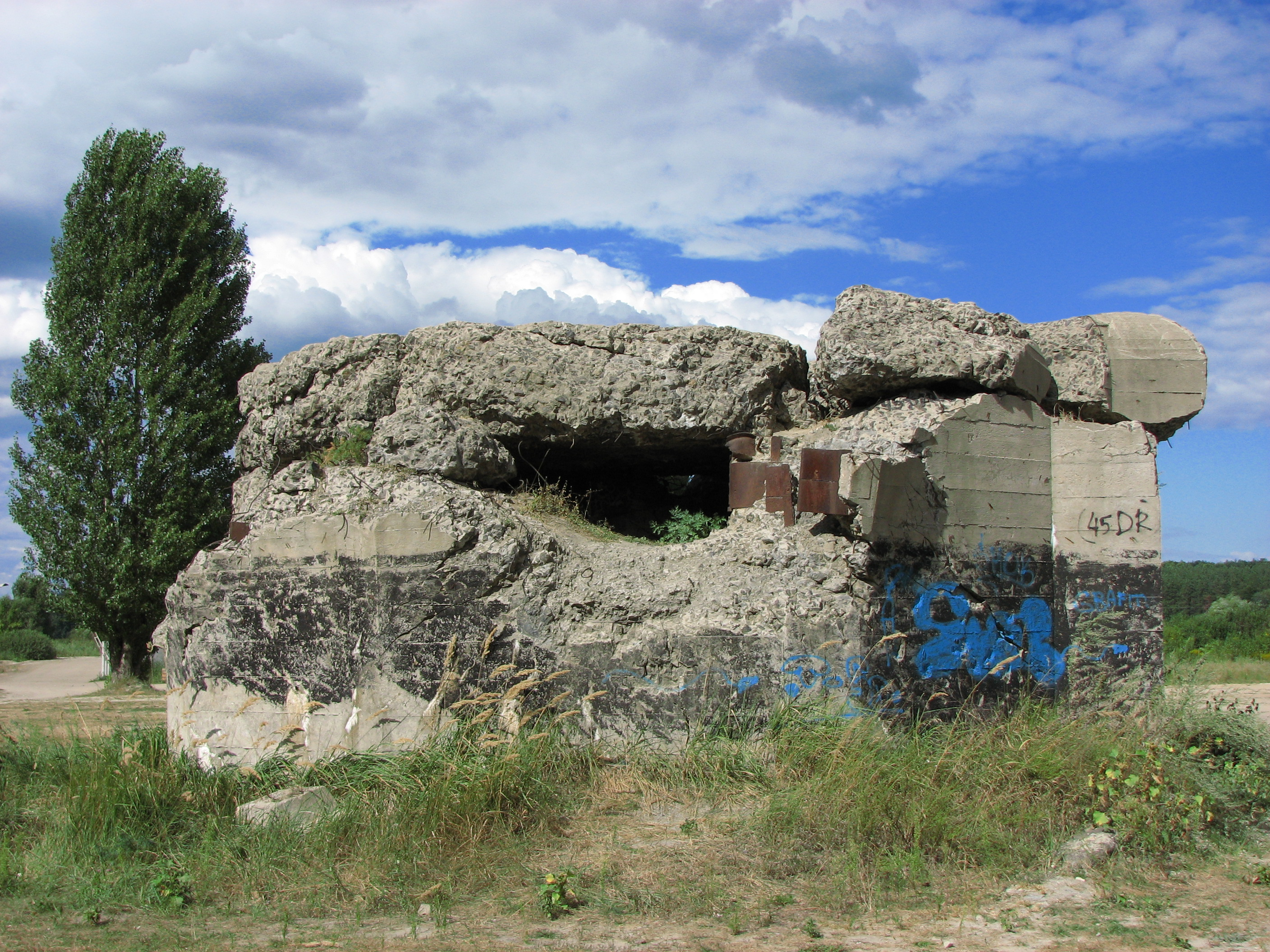
Pillbox 484
