= 92nd Training Centre (Ukraine) =

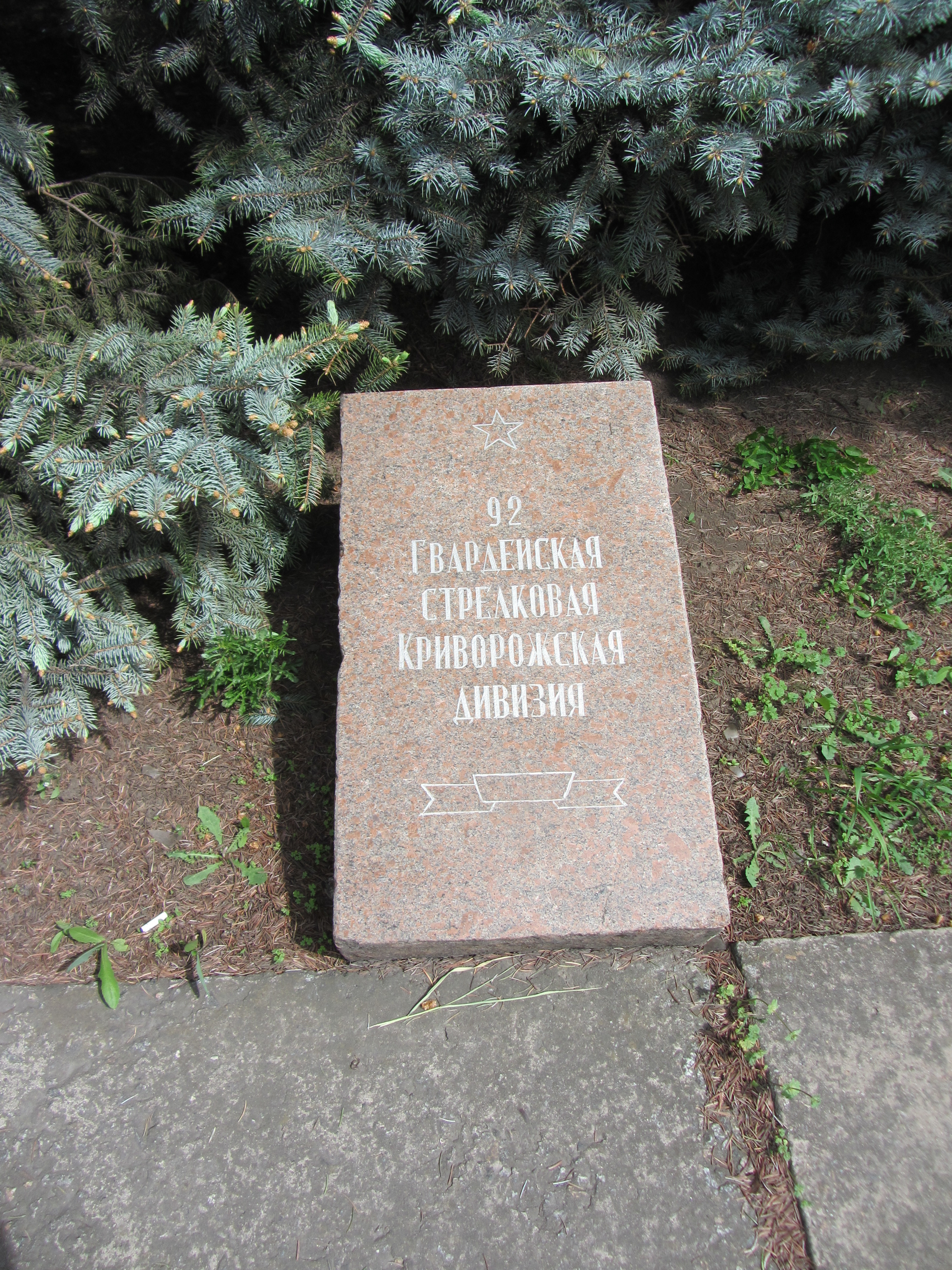
- Active: 1943–c. 2000s
- Country: Ukraine
- Branch: Army
- Garrison/HQ: Mykolaiv, Odessa Military District
- Engagements: Prokhorovka, Kharkiv, Poltava
- Decorations: Order of the Red Banner

The 92nd Training Centre was a formation of the Ukrainian Ground Forces, that drew most of its history from the 92nd Guards Rifle Division, that became the 92nd Guards Training Motor Rifle Division in 1965.

== World War II ==
The 92nd Guards Rifle Division was formed in March 1943 in Kupyansk from the soldiers of the 149th and 12th Guards Rifle Brigades, which had fought in the Battle of Stalingrad. The 93rd Rifle Brigade was established in September 1942 in the Urals. It became 12th Guards Rifle Brigade, then in April 1943, 92nd Guards Rifle Division.

In the summer of 1943 the division participated in the Battle of Prokhorovka, then in the capture of the cities of Kharkiv, Poltava, Voznesensk, Pervomaysk.

On 1 September 1943 the division was part of the 57th Rifle Corps. The corps comprised the 62nd Guards, 92nd Guards, 110th Guards, and 53rd Rifle Divisions. It was part of the 37th Army, STAVKA Reserve.

In 1943 the division liberated Kryvyi Rih, for which the division was named Krivorozhskaya. It crossed the River Dnieper near the village of Mishurin Rog. Soon afterwards, the division was awarded the Order of the Red Banner.

The division fought in Moldavia, and in the Second Jassy–Kishinev Offensive in Romania. It was with 37th Army in Bulgaria in May 1945. 48 soldiers of the division were awarded the title Hero of the Soviet Union.

=== Composition (partial) ===
- 276th Guards Rifle Regiment
- 280th Guards Rifle Regiment
- 282nd Guards Rifle Regiment
- 197th Guards Artillery Regiment

== Postwar ==
In 1946, the division was relocated to the city of Mykolaiv, joining the Odessa Military District. It became 34th Guards Mechanised Division postwar, the 34th Guards Motor Rifle Division in 1957. On 7 October 1960 it was redesignated as a training division, and was renumbered as the 92nd Guards Training Motor Rifle Division to restore its World War II designation on 11 January 1965. On 14 September 1987, it became the 150th Guards District Training Centre.

After the Soviet collapse, the centre became part of the Ukrainian Ground Forces. It was redesignated the 150th Training Centre for Junior Specialists and remained part of the Odessa Military District.

Its commander, Colonel Valery Alexandrovich Ageyev, of the Odessa Military District was promoted to major-general in Decree 350/93 of 21 August 1993. Duncan noted in April 1997 that '..the motor rifle training centre remain[s] under the command of the new MD.'

Later it was redesignated the 92nd Training Centre of the Southern Operational Command (92 УЦ ЮОК).
