= Mikhail Sharokhin =

Soviet-russian colonel general and hero of the Soviet Union

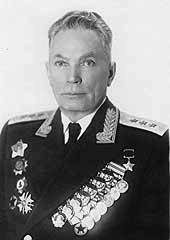
Mikhail Sharokhin

Mikhail Nikolaevich Sharokhin (Russian: Михаил Николаевич Шарохин, November 23, 1898 – September 19, 1974) was a Soviet military commander and Hero of the Soviet Union.

== Biography ==
He was born in the village of Ivanovskoje the Yaroslavl Governorate.
He fought in World War I and the Russian Civil War.

When the war with Germany broke out in 1941, Sharokin served in the General Staff: first as Deputy Chief of the Operations Directorate, then Deputy Chief of the General Staff.

From February 1942, he became Chief of Staff of the 3rd Shock Army on the Kalinin Front, from August 1942 Chief of Staff of the Northwestern Front and from October 1942 Chief of Staff of the Volkhov Front. In these posts he was involved in the operation against the Demyansk Pocket and Operation Iskra.

In August 1943, he received command of the 37th Army on the Steppe, 2nd and 3rd Ukrainian Fronts, which took part in the Poltava-Kremenchug, Dnieper, Nikopol–Krivoi Rog, Bereznegovato-Snigirevka, Odessa, Jassy-Kishinev and Bulgarian offensive operations. In these battles, his 37th Army crossed the Dnieper, Southern Bug and Dniester rivers, and by the end of September 1944, reached the Bulgarian cities of Kazanlak, Yambol and Burgas.

The 37th Army remained in Bulgaria until the end of the war, but Sharokin was placed at the head of the 57th Army until the end of war. With the 57th Army, he advanced through Hungary, Croatia and Austria and participated in the Budapest, Lake Balaton defensive, Nagykanizsa–Körmend, Vienna and Graz-Amstetten offensive operations.

By the decree of the Presidium of the Supreme Soviet of the USSR of April 28, 1945, Colonel-General Mikhail Nikolayevich Sharokhin was awarded the title of Hero of the Soviet Union with the Order of Lenin and the Gold Star medal for exemplary performance of command assignments on the front of the struggle against the German invaders and for the courage and heroism shown at the same time.

He remained in the Army as teacher and military consultant until his retirement in 1960.

== Sources ==
- Generals.dk
- Шарохин Михаил Николаевич, warheroes.ru (in Russian)
- Шарохин Михаил Николаевич, encyclopedia.mil.ru (in Russian)
