= 37th Army (Soviet Union) =

37th Army (1941–1946) 10th Mechanized Army (1946–1947)
- 37-я армия
- Active: 10 August – 15 November 1941; 25 September 1941 – 1947
- Disbanded: 1947
- Country: Soviet Union
- Branch: Red Army
- Type: Combined arms
- Size: Field Army
- Engagements: Battle of Kiev (1941); Barvenkovo-Lozovaya Offensive; North Caucasian Strategic Offensive; Odessa Offensive; Jassy–Kishinev Offensive (August 1944)

Commanders
- Notable commanders: Andrey Vlasov

The 37th Army (Russian: 37-я армия) was an army of the Soviet Union during the Second World War. The army was formed twice during the war. The army was part of the Southern Group of Forces in Romania and Bulgaria.

== First formation ==
The 37th Army was first formed on 23 July 1941 in the Southwestern Front with the command group from the Kiev Fortified Region and other reserves in the front reserves.

Upon formation, the army took up a defensive line to the west of Kiev and on the left bank of the Dnieper River. During the Battle of Kiev, the army suffered heavy losses against superior German forces. The army was encircled in the city of Kiev and ordered to break out on 19 September. Only a small part of the army managed to break out and regroup the front; many of the other units of the army were destroyed. The army was disbanded on 25 September 1941.

=== Composition ===
The army had the following units assigned when formed:

- 3rd Airborne Corps
- 28th Mountain Rifle Division
- 87th Rifle Division
- 147th Rifle Division
- 171st Rifle Division
- 175th Rifle Division
- 206th Rifle Division
- 284th Rifle Division
- 295th Rifle Division
- Kiev Fortified Region
- Artillery and other units.

== Second formation ==
The army was reformed on 15 November 1941 on the Southern Front for a counterattack in the Rostov area against the German 1st Panzer Army. These actions facilitated the 9th and 56th Armies' liberation of Rostov-on-Don. The army took part in the Barvenkovo-Lozovaya Offensive from 18 to 31 January 1942 with the goal of destroying the German Army in southern Ukraine.

The army conducted defensive operations during the summer and autumn of 1942 in reaction to Case Blue, the German offensive in southern Russia. The army was transferred from the Southern Front to the Don Group of the North Caucasian Front (first formation) in late July and then the Transcaucasian Front in August 1942.

As part of the North Caucasian Strategic Offensive, in January 1943, the army liberated the towns of Kislovodsk, Pyatigorsk, Essentuki, and Cherkessk. The army was transferred to the North Caucasian Front (second formation) on 24 January to participate in the Krasnodar Offensive. In July, the army forces were reassigned to the 9th and 56th Armies and the 37th Army was placed under Stavka control.

On 7 September 1943, the army was assigned to the Steppe Front. The army took part in the liberation of Left-bank Ukraine east of Kremenchug. In late September, it crossed the Dnieper River west of Keleberda and northwest of Mishurin Rog. The army was involved in offensive operations in the Krivoy Rog area from October to December.

On 15 January 1944, the army was transferred to the 3rd Ukrainian Front. It participated in the Odessa Offensive in conjunction with the 46th Army. From 8 August, the army participated in the Second Jassy–Kishinev Offensive, and in September, in the occupation of Bulgaria. By the end of September, its troops reached the settlements of Kazanlak, Yambol, and Burgas, where the army's combat history ended. The army remained in Bulgaria as a garrison for the rest of the war, and was redesignated as the 37th Separate Army on 15 December.

=== Composition ===
The army had the following units assigned when formed:

- 51st Rifle Division
- 96th Rifle Division
- 99th Rifle Division
- 216th Rifle Division
- 253rd Rifle Division
- 295th Rifle Division

Forces assigned on 7 September 1943 upon attachment to the Steppe Front:

- 57th Rifle Corps
- 82nd Rifle Corps
- 53rd Rifle Division

Forces assigned at the end of the war.

- 34th Rifle Corps
  - 259th Rifle Division
  - 353rd Rifle Division
  - 394th Rifle Division
- 66th Rifle Corps
  - 195th Rifle Division
  - 244th Rifle Division
  - 333rd Rifle Division
- 82nd Rifle Corps
  - 28th Guards Rifle Division
  - 92nd Guards Rifle Division
  - 188th Rifle Division
- 255th Naval Rifle Brigade
- 35th Antiaircraft Artillery Division
- Artillery, tank and engineer units.

== Post-war ==
The army was stationed in Bulgaria with its headquarters at Sofia as part of the Southern Group of Forces from 10 June 1945. On 10 June 1946, it was redesignated as the 10th Mechanized Army. It included four divisions: the 2nd Guards, 4th Guards, 19th, and 21st Mechanized Divisions. The 2nd Guards Mechanized Division at Craiova was the former 2nd Guards Mechanized Corps, the 4th Guards Mechanized Division at Sofia was the former 4th Guards Mechanized Corps, the 19th Mechanized Division at Plovdiv was the former 244th Rifle Division. The 21st Mechanized Division at Burgas was the former 223rd Rifle Division. The 21st Mechanized was withdrawn to the Soviet Union in July, leaving the army with only three divisions. The army was disbanded on 15 June 1947, along with its 19th Mechanized Division, after signing the peace treaties with Romania and Bulgaria.

== Commanders ==
The army's first formation was commanded by the following officer:

- Major General Andrey Vlasov (July–September 1941)

The army's second formation was commanded by the following officers:

- Major General (Promoted to Lieutenant General March 1942) Anton Lopatin (October 1941 – June 1942)
- Major General Pyotr Kozlov (June 1942 – May 1943)
- Lieutenant General Konstantin Koroteev (May – July 1943)
- Major General Alexander Filatov (July – August 1943)
- Major General Alexander Ryzhov (August 1943)
- Lieutenant General Mikhail Sharokhin (August 1943 – October 1944)
- Colonel General Sergey Biryuzov (October 1944 – May 1946)

The 10th Mechanized Army was commanded by the following officers.

- Lieutenant General Ivan Korchagin (12 June – 5 August 1946)
- Colonel General Sergey Biryuzov (August 1946 – 15 June 1947)
