= Ivan Sakharov =

Russian folklorist (1807–1863)

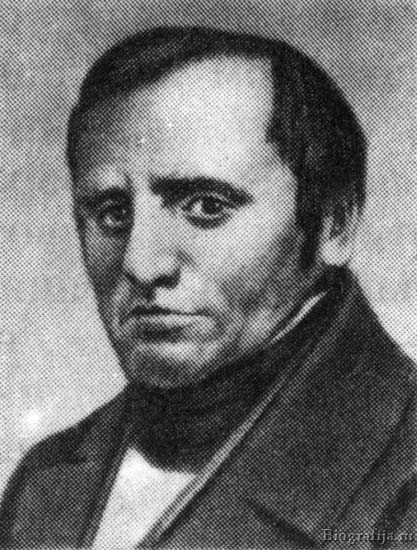
- Born: Иван Петрович Сахаров; September 10, 1807; Tula, Russian Empire
- Died: September 5, 1863 (aged 55); Tver Governorate, Russian Empire
- Occupations: folklorist, ethnographer

Ivan Petrovich Sakharov (Russian: Иван Петрович Сахаров, September 10, 1807, Tula, Russian Empire, — September 5, 1863, Valdai region, Tver Governorate, Russian Empire) was a Russian folklorist, ethnographer, archeologist and paleographer.

In the 1830s and early 1840s Sakharov published several highly popular books, including the Russian People's Tales of the Family Lives of Their Ancestors (Сказания русского народа о семейной жизни своих предков, 1836, in three volumes), Russian People's Journeys Into Foreign Lands (Путешествие русских людей в чужие земли, 1837) and Russian People's Songs (1838–1839, in two volumes). As scholars like Vladimir Dal, Alexander Afanasyev and Pyotr Kireevsky entered the Russian literary scene, the scientific quality of Sakharov's research and the authenticity of some of the documents he cited started to be questioned, notably by Apollon Grigoryev and Pyotr Bessonov; later several authors (among them Alexander Pypin, in "Falsifications of the Folklore Manuscripts", 1898) openly accused him of plagiarism and, in some cases, mystifications. Still, Ivan Sakharov was credited (by Brockhaus & Efron) as a pioneer figure in Russian ethnography, whose studies, according to Izmail Sreznevsky, have made "an extraordinary impression upon the [Russian] educated society and infused it with great respect for the Russian folklore."

== Legacy ==
Since 2005, the Sakharov Historical and Local History Readings have been held in the city of Aleksin, Tula Region. They are named in honor of I. P. Sakharov, as he was one of the first researchers of the Aleksin district. The results of his research were published in 1846 in the book “A Geographical Description of the Nature and Economy of the Town of Aleksin and the Aleksin District of the Tula Province.”
