= Emmanuil Dmitriev-Mamonov =

Russian painter

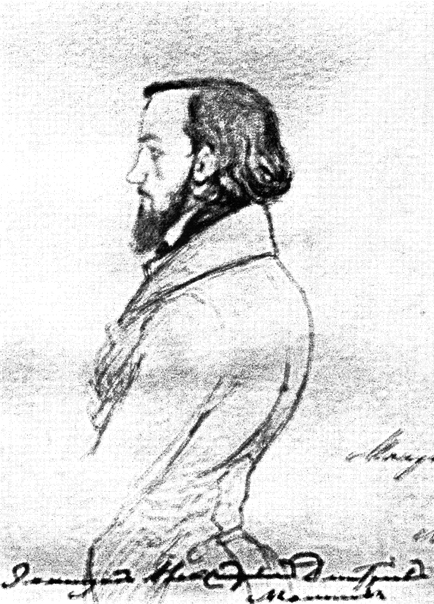
Self-caricature (late 1840s)

Emmanuil Aleksandrovich Dmitriev-Mamonov (Russian: Эммануи́л Алекса́ндрович Дми́триев-Мамо́нов; 19 January 1824 in Moscow – 30 December 1883 in Saint Petersburg) was a Russian portrait painter and graphic artist. He also worked as a book designer and caricaturist and was a respected art historian who supported the Slavophile movement.

== Biography ==
His father, Alexander, was an army officer and battle painter who, in 1820, was one of the founders of the Imperial Society for the Encouragement of the Arts.

In 1840, he entered the law faculty at Moscow University, alternating classes there with studies at the Imperial Academy of Arts. While there, he also became acquainted with the circle of slavophiles who met at the home of Avdotya Yelagina and created portrait sketches of them.

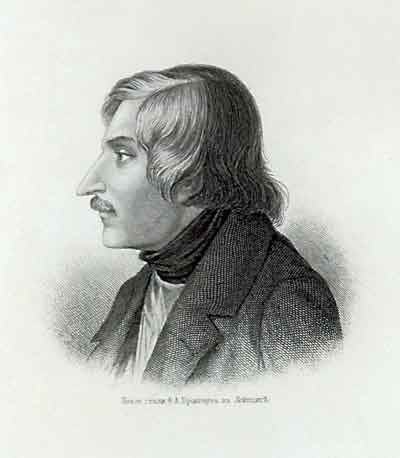
Nikolai Gogol (1852)

In the 1850s, he became a full-time student at the Moscow School of Painting, Sculpture and Architecture and, upon graduating, set himself up as a professional portrait painter and soon became very popular among the aristocracy. Among those he portrayed were Konstantin Aksakov, Pyotr Kireevsky, Nikolay Yazykov, Nikolai Gogol and Aleksey Khomyakov, who became a close friend. During these years, he also published his first works on art history, including a controversial essay that was critical of the Dutch Masters.

In 1858, the Academy officially awarded him the title of "Portrait Artist". That same year, he was one of the forty-eight signatories to a letter of protest against anti-Semitic remarks made by Vladimir Zotov and Pavel Shpilyevsky in the magazine Иллюстрация (Illustration).

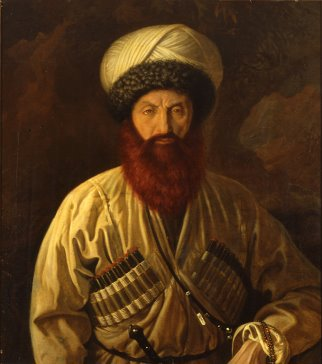
Imam Shamil (1860)

In 1860, he received a stipend from the Academy that allowed him to study abroad. He visited Paris and Dresden, then settled in Italy, but never lost contact with his friends in Russia. His first disagreement with his fellow Slavophiles came in 1863, when he took issue with their criticism of the January Uprising and called on the Tsar to give Poland its freedom. By the early 1870s, he had completely abandoned Pan-Slavism. In Rome, he also associated with a circle of Russian artists that included Mikhail Botkin and Fyodor Bronnikov and became acquainted with Mikhail Bakunin, who introduced him to Marxism.

In 1874, he returned to Russia. After spending some time in Tartu, he settled in Saint Petersburg in 1879. He died, following a series of illnesses, in 1883.
