= Nikolai Fyodorov (philosopher) =

Russian philosopher and life extensionist

- Николай Фёдоров
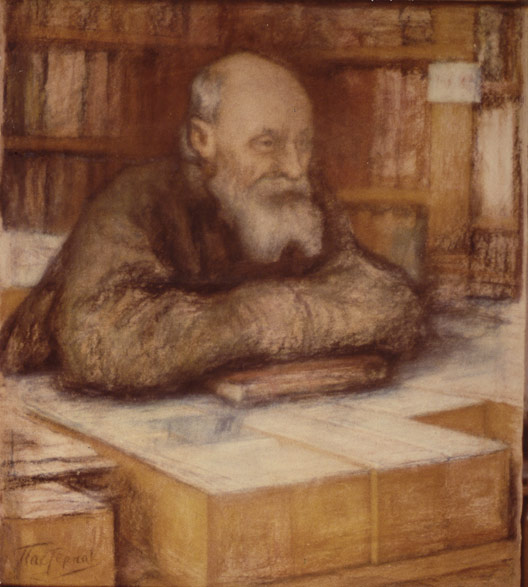
- Nikolai Fyodorov by Leonid Pasternak
- Born: 7 June 1829; Klyuchi, Tambov Governorate, Russian Empire
- Died: 28 December 1903 (aged 74); Moscow, Russian Empire

Philosophical work
- Region: Russian philosophy
- School: Russian cosmism
- Main interests: Origin, evolution, and future existence of the cosmos and humankind
- Notable ideas: Cosmism, pantheism, panpsychism, personalism, common task, transhumanism, physical immortality, resurrection of the dead, space colonization, apocatastasis

Nikolai Fyodorovich Fyodorov (Note: surname also romanized as "Fedorov", known in his family as Nikolai Pavlovich Gagarin,) (Russian: Николай Фёдорович Фёдоров; 9 June 1829 – 28 December 1903) was a Russian religious philosopher, futurologist, library scientist, and educator. He started the movement of Russian cosmism which was a precursor of transhumanism.

Fyodorov advocated radical life extension, physical immortality and even resurrection of the dead, using scientific methods.

He was called the "Socrates of Moscow." He was referred to with respect and admiration by Leo Tolstoy, Fyodor Dostoevsky, and V. S. Solovyov. His ideas influenced a diverse group of people, from early rocket scientists like Konstantin Tsiolkovsky to artists and composers, including Alexander Scriabin. He dreamed of resurrecting people, not wanting to be reconciled to the death of even one person. With the help of science, he intended to gather scattered molecules and atoms to "put them into the bodies of the fathers".

Fyodorov gave science a place next to art and religion in the Common Task of uniting humanity, including the dead, who must in the future be reunited with the living. He held that "we can become immortal and godlike through rational efforts and that our moral obligation is to create a heaven to be shared by all who ever lived." He was a devout member of the Russian Orthodox Christian Church, but was never a clergyman.

== Biography ==
He was born on 26 May (7 June) (Note: Son of Ivan Alexeyevich Gagarin) 1829 in the village of Klyuchi, Tambov Province (now Sasovsky District, Ryazan Oblast, Russia). As the illegitimate son of Prince Pavel Ivanovich Gagarin (1798–1872) (Note: Son of Ivan Alexeyevich Gagarin) he received the surname of his godfather.

It is known that he also had an older brother, Alexander (with whom he was brought up and educated together until 1851) and three sisters.

His mother was Elisaveta Ivanova Makarova, a woman from the minor Russian nobility.

In 1836 he was admitted to the district school, in 1842 in the Tambov Men's Gymnasium, after which in 1849, he entered the cameral department of the Lyceum Richelieu in Odessa, where he studied for two years, then was forced to leave the Lyceum because of the death of his uncle Konstantin Ivanovich Gagarin, who paid the tuition fees.

In 1854 he received a teacher's certificate in the Tambov gymnasium and was appointed teacher of history and geography at the Lipetsk district school.

From October 1858 he taught at the Borovsky School in Tambov Province. Then he moved to Bogorodsk Moscow province and soon to Uglich Yaroslavl province, from where he went to Odoev, then to Bogoroditsk Tula province.

From November 1866 to April 1869 N. F. Fedorov taught at Borovsky district school. At this time he became acquainted with Nikolai Pavlovich Peterson, one of the teachers at Leo Tolstoy's school in Yasnaya Polyana. Because of his acquaintance with Peterson, he was arrested in the Dmitry Karakozov case, but was released three weeks later.

From July 1867 to April 1869 he gave private lessons in Moscow, to Mikhailovsky's children.

In 1869 he got a job as assistant librarian in Chertkovskaya library, and from 1874 for 25 years he worked as a librarian of the Rumyantsev Museum, in the last years of his life – in the reading room of the Moscow Main Archive of the Ministry of Foreign Affairs. At the Rumyantsev Museum Fyodorov was the first to compile a systematic catalog of books. There after three o'clock in the afternoon (closing time of the museum) and on Sundays there was a discussion club, which was attended by many prominent contemporaries.

Fyodorov led an ascetic life, tried not to own any property, gave away most of his salary to his "fellows," refused increases in salary, and always walked.

Fedorov refused to be photographed and would not allow his portrait to be painted. One image of Fedorov was made secretly by Leonid Pasternak; another was made in 1902 by the artist Sergei Korovin, apparently in absentia.

Fyodorov opposed the idea of property of books and ideas and never published anything during his lifetime. His selected articles were printed posthumously with the title Philosophy of the Common Task (also known as Philosophy of Physical Resurrection).

He died in the winter of 1903 of pneumonia in a shelter for the poor. He was buried in the cemetery of the Sorrow Monastery.

In 1930 as a part of the Soviet Desecration of Graves his grave and all other graves in the monastery were destroyed by the Soviet Union.

== Philosophy ==
Fyodorov was a futurist, who theorized about the eventual perfection of the human race and society (i.e., utopia), including radical ideas like immortality, revival of the dead, space and ocean colonization. He was an adamant defender of universalism and wanted universal rather than particular immortality and resurrection through something he called the common task of humanity. He was a strong advocate of ancestor worship and saw people's genealogical and social relationships as reflecting their value and was critical of individualism as making people expendable. He was a strong advocate of religion and saw the Common Task as the proper interpretation of Christianity.

=== Humankind's Common Task ===
According to Fyodorov, "the aim of true progress can and must be the participation in a common task." For him, the Common Task meant "to regulate the forces of nature, to defeat death and bring ancestors back to life, so that they too would participate in the general resurrection." This idea was so central to his philosophy that "whatever topic he wrote about, Fedorov brought in his main idea of the Common Task—how to achieve universal brotherhood, rationalise nature instead of merely exploiting her bounties, overcome death, resurrect the ancestors and create a united humanity worthy of governing the universe."

Fyodorov argued that evolutionary process was directed towards increased intelligence and its role in the development of life. Humanity is the culmination of evolution, as well as its creator and director. Humans must therefore direct evolution where their reason and morality dictate. Fyodorov also argued that mortality is the most obvious indicator of the still imperfect, contradictory nature of humanity and the underlying reason for most evil and nihilism of humankind. Fyodorov stated that the struggle against death can become the most natural cause uniting all people of Earth, regardless of their nationality, race, citizenship or wealth (he called this the Common Task).

Fyodorov thought that death and afterdeath existence should become the subject of comprehensive scientific inquiry, that achieving immortality and revival is the greatest goal of science, and that this knowledge must leave the laboratories and become the common property of all: "Everyone must be learning and everything be the subject of knowledge and action".

=== Renewable energy and ecological engineering ===
Fyodorov was an advocate of climate engineering. He praised an 1891 Russian military experiment in cloud seeding using explosives in response to the Russian famine of 1891–1892. Fyodorov argued that this could transform humanity as militaries could be directed towards a Common Task rather than violence. He described cloud seeding as being analogous to irrigation for sky rivers, and that the proper Christian way was to do this redirection, and objections on the basis of this going against the will of God were foolish.

Fyodorov argued that adoption of renewable energy was a moral obligation, to stop workers from being exploited in mining. He particularly mentioned iron and coal mining, and taking energy from solar power and wind power. Fyodorov said that Man does not live in harmony with nature but that this is a common urban delusion brought about by lack of contact with nature.

=== Two reasons for death ===
Human life, emphasized Fyodorov, dies for two reasons. First is internal: due to the material organization of a human, his or her functionality is incapable of infinite self-renewal. To overcome this, psychophysiological regulation of human organisms is needed. The second reason is the unpredictable nature of the external environment; its destructive character must be overcome with the regulation of nature. Regulation of nature, "introducing will and reason into nature" includes, according to Fyodorov, prevention of natural disasters, control of Earth's climate, fight against viruses and epidemics, mastery of solar power, space exploration and unlimited creative work there.

=== Immortality for all ===
Achieving immortality and resurrection of all people who ever lived are two inseparable goals, according to Fyodorov. Immortality is impossible, both ethically and physically, without resurrection. We cannot allow our ancestors, who gave us life and culture, to remain buried, or our relatives and friends to die. Achieving immortality for individuals alive today and future generations is only a partial victory over death – only the first stage. The complete victory will be achieved only when everyone is resurrected and transformed to enjoy immortal life.

=== Ancestor veneration ===
He was an advocate for veneration of the dead and saw it as being the foundation of true religion, he linked it to God referring to himself as the God of the fathers. He saw a common ancestry and common personal relationships and genealogical relations between people as serving a foundation for their social participation likewise he saw people who identified as individuals independent of their ancestors as being easily manipulated by outside forces He linked this to the Christian concept of the son of man and saw the common project of humanity as transforming all into great men.

He criticized progressivism as a narcissistic view by younger generations against their ancestors.

He criticized socialism on the basis that it was based on material benefits of association of replaceable individuals in contrast with his system of resurrection where by contrast all people based on their familial links were irreplaceable.

As an extension of this ancestor focus Fyodorov saw great issue with the decline of graveyards connected to churches in favor of standalone cemeteries and advocated making graveyards in universities. This has been linked to cryonics by some commentators although he predated the movement.

=== Restoring life and making it infinite ===
Fyodorov tried to plan specific actions for scientific research of the possibility of restoring life and making it infinite. His first project involved collecting and synthesizing decayed remains of dead based on "knowledge and control over all atoms and molecules of the world". This idea of Fyodorov is related to the modern practice of cloning. The second method described by Fyodorov is genetic-hereditary. The revival could be done successively in the ancestral line: sons and daughters restore their fathers and mothers, they in turn restore their parents and so on. This means restoring the ancestors using the hereditary information that they passed on to their children. Using this genetic method it is only possible to create a genetic twin of the dead person (the problem of identity in cloning). It is necessary to give back the revived person his old mind, his personality. Fyodorov speculates about the idea of "radial images" that may contain the personalities of the people and survive after death. Nevertheless, Fyodorov noted that even if a soul is destroyed after death, humanity will learn to restore it whole by mastering the forces of decay and fragmentation.

=== Transformation of past physical forms ===
The revival of people who lived during the past is not a recreation of their past physical form – it was imperfect, parasitic, centered on mortal existence. Fyodorov's idea was to transform it into self-creating, mind-controlled form, capable of infinite renewal, which is immortal. Those who haven't died will go through the same transformation. Humans will have to become creators and organizers of their organisms ("our body will be our business"). In the past the development of civilization happened by increasing human power using external tools and machines – the human body remained imperfect.

=== Transhumanism ===
Fyodorov stated that people needed to reconcile the difference between the power of technology and weakness of the human physical form. The transition is overdue from purely technical development, a "prosthetic" civilization, to organic progress, when not just external tools, artificial implements, but the organisms themselves are improved, so that, for example, a person can fly, see far and deep, travel through space, live in any environment. People must become capable of "organodevelopment" that so far only nature was capable of. Fyodorov discussed supremacy of mind, "giving, developing organs for itself" and anticipated V. Vernadsky's idea of autotrophic humans. He argues that a person must become an autotrophic, self-feeding creature, acquire a new mode of energy exchange with the environment that will not end.

Fyodorov repeatedly said that only general scientific studies of aging, death and postmortem studies can deliver the means to overcome death and promote indefinite healthy lifespan.

=== Scientific education for all ===
Fyodorov argued that all people must be lifted up from poverty so that they may participate in scientific inquiry. He argued that without this pure science would be indifferent to human suffering while applied science would only be used for destructive purposes such as military or the creation of consumer goods with addictive qualities. As such he argued against social specialization in favor of a society of generalists who each pursued all things.

Fyodorov criticized Immanuel Kant for being isolated from the world as a member of a scholarly class and constructing the solipsistic view of transcendental idealism as a reflection of his separation from the world and working class. Likewise he argued that making everyone a scholar would lead to a reduction in addiction and other forms of escapism such as hypnotism as people would be more connected to the world itself.

He criticized Critique of Practical Reason as being too individualistic and only able to give individual prescriptions but not societal ones. Constrained to artificial toy sized experiments and a childishness of knowledge.

He criticized positivism as being inconsistent and only negating.

He praised Aristotle for his epistemic views and described him as promoting a unity of knowledge and action, and he criticized subsequent Western philosophy for failing to build upon this and promoting impractical knowledge.

=== Opposition to nationalism ===
Fyodorov opposed nationalism citing it as replacing loyalty the land of one's fathers with pride in their achievements, pride being a sin and love being a virtue

=== Sexual relationships ===
He also argued that sexual relationships led to men being attached to women and alienated from their ancestors, potentially introducing strife into the world. He was celibate.

He believed universal compulsory education must occur before marriage so people could decide whether they wanted to get married.

=== Criticism of Buddhism ===
According to Fyodorov, Buddhism is a negative and passive religion that does not see disunity, hate and enmity as the greatest evil, nor does it consider unification and universal love as the greatest good. It encourages a life of constant meditation and inaction in isolation, then laments the illusoriness of the world. Fyodorov criticizes the Buddhist idea that natural phenomena are ghostly and elusive until they become the product of the general will and activity of all humans, acting as God's tools, and argues that these notions will remain dream-like until they become projects that are achieved by the general human will and that of God manifested in it.

=== Aliens ===
Fyodorov contemplated the existence of extraterrestrial life but came to the conclusion if they did exist they did not participate in the common project of resurrection, and this may explain their seeming absence. This may be seen as an early proposed solution to the Fermi paradox.

== Contemporaries about Fyodorov ==
In the 1870s, while working as a librarian, Fyodorov was acquainted with K. E. Tsiolkovsky (Note: В возрасте 10 лет Циолковский перенес скарлатину, после чего остался практически глухим. Его не принимали в гимназию, и он три года учился самостоятельно в румянцевской библиотеке под руководством Фёдорова. Юноша заинтересовался идеей колонизации космоса, способной, по мнению его наставника Фёдорова, освободить человечество. В дальнейшем идеи Фёдорова через труды Циолковского повлияли на конструктора первых советских ракет С.П. Королёва.). Tsiolkovsky recalled that Fyodorov also wanted to make him his "boarder" and called Fyodorov "an amazing philosopher". He met Nikolai Fyodorov in the Chertkovo public library in Moscow. Tsiolkovsky admitted that Fyodorov replaced his university professors.

"By the way, in the Chertkov library I noticed a clerk with an unusually kind face. I've never seen anything like that before. It is true that the face is the mirror of the soul. When tired and homeless people fell asleep in the library, he paid no attention to it. Another librarian would wake me up sternly right away.

He also gave me forbidden books. Then it turned out that it was the famous ascetic Fyodorov, a friend of Tolstoy and an amazing philosopher and humble man. He gave away all his tiny salary to the poor. Now I see that he wanted to make me his pensioner, but it failed: I am too wild.

Then I also learned that he was for a time a teacher in Borovsk, where I served much later. I remember a good-looking brunette, of medium height, with a bald head, but rather decently dressed. Fyodorov was the illegitimate son of some nobleman and a serf. Because of his modesty he did not want to publish his works, despite the full opportunity to do so and the entreaties of friends. He was educated in the Lyceum. One day Leo Tolstoy said to him, "I would leave only a few dozen books in this library, and throw away the rest. Fyodorov replied: "I have seen many fools, but I have never seen such a thing..

In 1878 F. M. Dostoevsky became acquainted with Fyodorov's teachings as presented by Peterson. Dostoevsky wrote of Fyodorov: "He interested me too much ... In essence I absolutely agree with these thoughts. I have read them as if for my own".

In the 1880s and 1890s, Solovyov communicated regularly with Fyodorov. Solovyov wrote to Fyodorov: "I read your manuscript with avidity and delight of spirit, devoting to this reading the whole night and part of the morning, and the next two days, Saturday and Sunday, thought much about what I read. "Your 'project' I accept unconditionally and without any talk ... Since the advent of Christianity, your 'project' is the first forward movement of the human spirit on the path of Christ. For my part, I can only recognize you as my teacher and spiritual father ... Bless you, dear teacher and comforter. The influence of Fyodorov is noticeable in Solovyov's work "On the Decline of Medieval Worldview"

Afanasy Fet was also a fan of Fyodorov.

His writings greatly influenced mystic Peter Uspensky.

=== Fyodorov and Tolstoy ===
Leo Tolstoy held Fyodorov in high regard, and was proud of having associated with him. The two initially met in 1878 at the Rumyantsev Museum, with closer contact starting in October 1881. They were quite friendly, sharing many ideas in the 1880s and early 90s. However, their relationship soured after 1892 due to ideological differences. While Fyodorov and Tolstoy shared religious beliefs, Fyodorov adhered much more strongly to Orthodox rituals. A rift developed between them due to Tolstoy's anti-clerical stance in his work and Fyodorov's view of Tolstoy as unpatriotic. The final break occurred in 1892 when Tolstoy wrote a scathing article for the London Daily Telegraph titled "Why are the Russian peasants starving?", accusing the tsarist administration of neglecting the peasants during a period of food shortages. After this, Fyodorov refused to meet with Tolstoy.

== Technological proposals ==
He proposed an orbital ring that controlled the weather in addition to communicating telegraphs.

== Intellectual and cultural heritage ==
=== Philosophical ideas ===
Fyodorov laid the foundations of a worldview capable of opening new ways of understanding humanity's place and role in the universe. Unlike many who tried to construct a universal planetary and cosmic worldview based on Eastern religions and occult ideas about the world, Fyodorov considered himself a deeply religious Christian. He believed that the medieval worldview was untenable after the Copernican Revolution, which opened the cosmic perspective to man. But the main thing, according to Fyodorov, in the teachings of Christ – the message of the coming bodily resurrection, the victory over the "last enemy," that is, death – he kept unshaken, putting forward the idea that this victory would be accomplished with the creative efforts and labor of Humanity united in a fraternal family.

Fyodorov at the end of the 19th century already foresaw what in the second half of the 20th century became known as "ecological global problems" and "ecological thinking. He put forward the idea of transforming the regular army from an instrument of death and destruction into a weapon against the destructive elements of nature – tornadoes, hurricanes, droughts, floods – which today cause billions of dollars of damage to humanity every year. Today's science is already capable in principle of provide the means to combat these elements, and the main factor on which the solution of these problems depends, is the fragmentation of mankind, lack of reason and goodwill. However, according to the Christian worldview, the presence of natural disasters is not evidence of the disunity of mankind, but of the corruption of human nature as a consequence of the fall into sin.

Fyodorov is called a philosopher of memory and homeland studies. In his works many pages are devoted to history and culture, both Russian and world. He repeatedly expressed his views on the study and preservation of the cultural heritage of the past, did much for the development of local history in pre-revolutionary Russia, and stood up for overcoming the historical forgetfulness, the retail of generations.

Fyodorov was a religious man who participated in the liturgical life of the Church. At the heart of his life position was the commandment of St. Sergius of Radonezh: "Looking to the unity of the Holy Trinity, to overcome the hateful division of this world. In Fyodorov's works the Holy Trinity is mentioned many times; it is in the Trinity that he saw the root of man's coming immortality.

In social and psychological terms, the image of the Trinity was for him the antithesis of both Western individualism and the Eastern "dissolution of the individual into the universal. In his life and writings a synthesis of religion and science was evident. The religious publicist and philosopher V.N. Ilyin called Nikolai Fyodorov a great saint of his time and compared him to Seraphim of Sarov.

=== Fyodorov and Librarianship ===
Libraries occupied a special place in Fyodorov's philosophy. Fyodorov wrote about the great importance of libraries and museums as centers of spiritual heritage, centers of collecting, research and education, moral education. Libraries communicate with the great ancestors and should become the center of public life, analogous to temples, a place where people are introduced to culture and science.

Fyodorov promoted the ideas of international book exchange, the use of books from private collections in libraries, the organization of exhibition departments in libraries. At the same time he was against the copyright system, as it obviously contradicted the needs of libraries.

The concept of museum and library education developed by N. F. Fyodorov's concept of museum and library education became the basis of the pedagogical programs of the International Society "Ecopolis and Culture".

=== Development of Fyodorov's ideas in science, art, and religion ===
With the "Philosophy of Common Task" by N. F. Fyodorov begins a philosophical and scientific direction of universal knowledge: Russian cosmism, active-evolutionary, noosphere thought, represented in the XX century by such major scientists and philosophers as mycologist N. A. Naumov, V. I. Vernadsky, A. L. Chizhevsky, V. S. Solovyov, N. A. Berdyaev, S. N. Bulgakov, P. A. Florensky and others. Drawing attention to the fact of the direction of evolution toward the generation of reason, consciousness, cosmists put forward the idea of active evolution, that is, the need for a new conscious stage in the development of the world, when humanity directs it in the direction that reason and moral feeling dictate it, takes the wheel of evolution in its hands, so to speak. For evolutionary thinkers, man is still an intermediate being in the process of growth, far from perfect, but together consciously creative, called to transform not only the external world, but also his own nature. It is essentially about expanding the rights of conscious-spiritual forces, about the control of matter by spirit, about the spiritualization of the world and man. Cosmic expansion is one part of this grand program. The cosmists succeeded in combining care for the big whole – Earth, biosphere, cosmos with the deepest demands of the highest value – the concrete person. An important place here is occupied by questions related to overcoming disease and death and achieving immortality.

The planetary worldview put forward by N. F. Fyodorov and Russian philosopher-cosmists is now called the "worldview of the third millennium." This worldview is the idea of man as a consciously creative being, man as an agent of evolution responsible for all life on the planet, and of the earth as a "common home." Man's place in the world remains important in our era, as humanity is facing questions about man's relationship to nature and its resources, and of the imperfect mortal nature of man, which gives rise to individual and societal evil. Philosopher-cosmists have proposed this particular version of ecology, aiming to solve the global problems of our time. Their idea of fruitful dialogue between nations and cultures, each contributing to the "building of noosphere," purports to be an effective means of education within the spirit of interethnic harmony and an opposition to chauvinism, or, the rivalry of "national egoisms." The idea of continuity, memory, and connection with the spiritual heritage of the past, received a new ethical justification in the philosophy of N. F. Fyodorov, and is relevant today. The reflections of cosmist thinkers on the need for moral orientation of all spheres of human knowledge and creativity, on the cosmicization of science, and on the reconciliation and union of faith and knowledge in the Common Task of preservation and multiplication of life on Earth show the focus of this belief.

Fyodorov can rightfully be considered a forerunner and prophet of the noosphere worldview, whose foundations are laid in the works of V. I. Vernadsky and P. Teilhard de Chardin. The transhumanism movement that emerged at the end of the 20th century also considers Fyodorov its forerunner. At the same time, transhumanism calls for endless human perfection with technical achievements, while Fyodorov considered technology a temporary, side branch of civilization development. He believed that "the forces of man should be directed in the other direction - to the improvement and transformation of himself".

Philosophy of common task has resonated in the work of many 20th century writers, poets, artists, such as V. Bryusov and V. Mayakovsky, N. Klyuev and V. Khlebnikov, M. Gorky and M. Prishvin, A. Platonov and B. Pasternak, V. Chekrygin and P. Filonov. Their work was touched by the depth of ethical requirements of Fyodorov, the uniqueness of his aesthetics, the idea of the regulation of nature, overcoming death, debt to past generations. It is no coincidence that A. L. Volynsky wrote of the thinker "Fyodorov is the only, inexplicable and incomparable phenomenon in the mental life of mankind... The birth and life of Fyodorov justified the millennial existence of Russia. Now no one on the globe will turn his tongue to reproach us that we have not thrown to the ages neither a prolific thought, nor the genius of the work begun ...".

=== The connection to astronautics ===
Tsiolkovsky's thought: "Earth is the cradle of mankind, but not forever to live in a cradle!" was clearly inspired by the ideas of N. F. Fyodorov. It was he who first stated that before the restored in its entirety humanity lies the path to the development of the entire cosmic space, in which man plays the most important role of the carrier of the Mind, is the force that opposes the destruction and heat death of the universe, which will inevitably come if man will give up his role as a conductor of the Divine Energy in the mortal world.

The ideas of Fyodorov later inspired the founders of Russian cosmonautics. His works, published after his death in 1903 by Fyodorov's followers V. A. Kozhevnikov and N. P. Peterson under the title "Philosophy of Common Task", were carefully read by Sergei Korolev. Since Nikolai Fyodorov was the illegitimate son of Prince Gagarin, there is an opinion that the names of Yuri Gagarin and Nikolai Fyodorov stand side by side in the history of cosmonautics.

== Popular culture ==
The 2011 BBC documentary Knocking on Heaven's Door, about the Space Race in the former Soviet Union, suggests that, in many people's eyes, Nikolai Fyodorov was the true father of the Soviet space project that put the first man in space.

Fyodorov's thought is extensively though indirectly discussed and alluded to in the well-regarded 2010 science fiction novel The Quantum Thief; it is implied that the founders of the post-human collective of uploaded minds called the Sobornost were inspired by Fyodorov and other thinkers associated with cosmism.

The 2013 novel Strange Bodies by Marcel Theroux imagines Fyodorov's ideas of the Common Task being developed by Soviet and post-Soviet research to implant a mind into another body using an encoded lexicon from the original mind and an unspecified, but painful, procedure.

Manga Gunnm : Mars Chronicle in 2022 chapter LOG_044 has also directly mention Fyodorov's name and recalling The Philosophy of the Common Task.

Episode 4 of the first season of 2026 alternative history TV series Star City uses Philosophy of the Common Task as a plot device. The book, banned by Soviet authorities, serves as the basis for the detention of a space engineer, who claims in defense that half of the engineers have read Fyodorov.

== Legacy ==
=== 1920s ===
At the height of the Russian Civil War, a group of biocosmists-immortalists was formed (a breakaway from the Anarchist-Universalists). The group denied death as logically absurd, ethically intolerant and aesthetically ugly, and advocated galactic liberation from the state, calling for the immediate establishment of space communications. Two basic demands were made: freedom of movement in outer space and the right to eternal life.

In 1921, the poet Alexander Svyatogorov, a follower of Fyodorov, compiled a manifesto of Biocosmism, in which he gave two definitions of death: bodily and spiritual ("death while alive"). Svyatogorov also developed Fyodorov's idea of turning the Earth into a giant interstellar spaceship.

=== Modernity ===
At the end of the 20th century in Russia interest in Fyodorov's work and ideas increased again. In Moscow at the end of the 1980s the Fyodorov Museum was established in Moscow in the late 80s. In the Fyodorov Museum there is a regular scientific and philosophical seminar, where Fyodorov's ideas are discussed by physicists and biologists, philosophers and literary scholars, politicians and businessmen. In 1988, in the city of Borovsk. Borovsk, where N. F. Fyodorov and K. E. Tsiolkovsky worked at the same school with an interval of 30 years, the First All-Union Fyodorovsky Readings were held. The tradition of Fyodorovsky readings became regular and in 2003 the International Congress "Cosmism and Russian Literature" was held in Belgrade. To the 100th anniversary of the death of N.F. Fyodorov". Vladimir Evgenievich Lepsky relies on Fyodorov's critique of individualism, justifying the need for public participation in self-developing polysubjective environments.

The first monument to Nikolai Fyodorov in Russia was unveiled on 23 October 2009 in Borovsk of Kaluga Oblast.

In contemporary popular culture, Fyodorov's ideas have gained popularity through science fiction works, such as Hannu Raianiemi's trilogy Quantum Thief and Igor Miretsky's novel The Archivist. His ideas also feature prominently in Karl Ove Knausgård's novel The Wolves of Eternity (2021) and Richard Powers's novel Playground (2024).

== See also ==
- Anthony Atala
- Cryonics
- Immortalism
- Printable organs
- Regenerative medicine
- Russian Futurism
