= Avdotya Yelagina =

Avdotya Petrovna Elagina
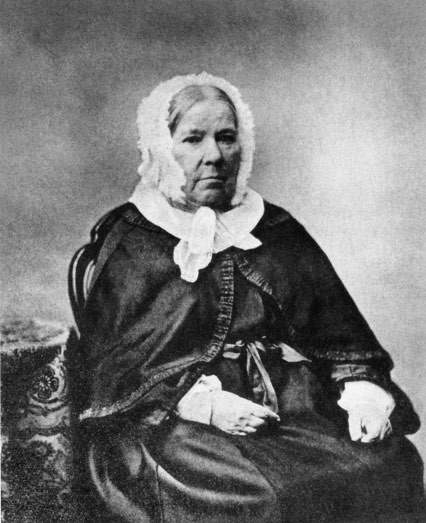
- Born: 11 January 1789; Belyovsky Uyezd, Russia
- Died: 13 June 1877 (aged 88); Tartu, Russia
- Noble family: Yushkova
- Issue: Ivan Kireyevsky; Pyotr Kireevsky; Daria; Vasily; Nikolai; Andrey; Elizaveta
- Father: Pyotr Nikolaevich Yushkov
- Mother: Varvara Afanasievna Bunina

Avdotya Petrovna Yelagina, née Yushkova (Russian: Авдо́тья Петро́вна Ела́гина; 22 January 1789, Petrishchevo, Belyovsky Uyezd, Tula Governorate - 13 June 1877, Dorpat) was a Russian translator, who hosted a popular social and literary salon.

== Biography ==
Her father, Pyotr Nikolaevich Yushkov (d. 1805), was a major landowner. Her mother, Varvara Afanasievna, née Bunina, died of consumption when Avdotya was only eight years old, so she was raised by her grandmother, Maria Grigorievna Bunina (1729–1811). Literary salons were a common event at her home while she was growing up.

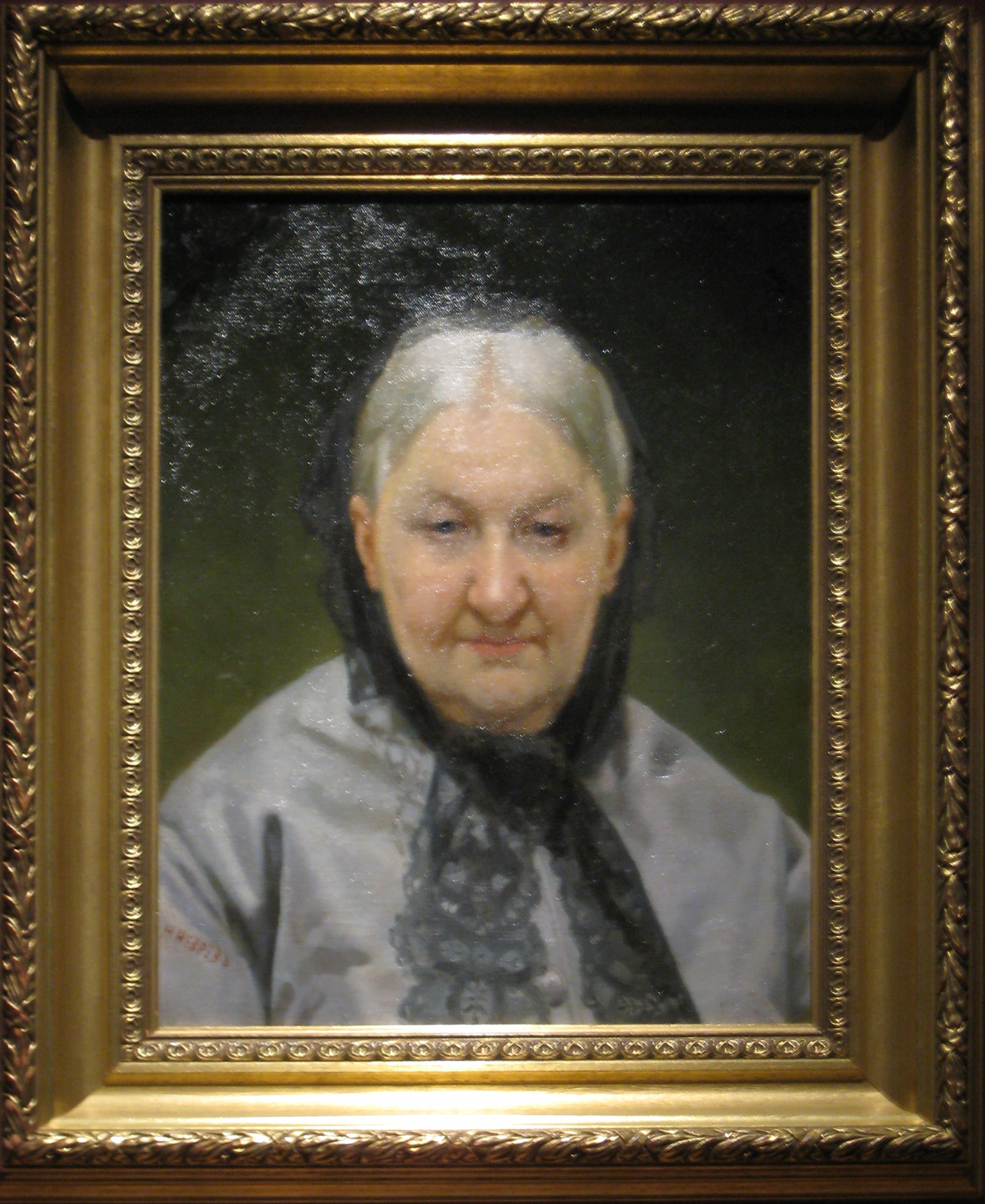
A portrait by Nikolai Nevrev (c.1870)

At the age of sixteen, shortly after her father's death, she was married to Vasily Ivanovich Kireyevsky (1773–1812), from an old noble family, who had served as a cavalry captain and a judge. He was religiously intolerant, but well-educated, and the marriage was apparently a happy one. They had two daughters and two sons: Ivan, a philosopher and literary critic, and Pyotr, a folklorist and philologist. Following her husband's death from typhus, she and her children went to live with an aunt, Yekaterina Afanasievna Protasova (1770–1848), the sister-in-law of poet Vasily Zhukovsky.

In 1817, while on her way to a niece's wedding, she fell into some icy water, developed a serious cold, and had to stop for treatment in Kozelsk. There, she met her second cousin, a writer and translator named Alexei Andreyevich Yelagin (1790–1846), and they soon became close. Shortly after, that same year, they were married. They had a son who died as an infant, a son and daughter who died young, and two sons who lived to become famous: Vasily, an historian, and Nikolai (1822–1876), a landowner who played a role in the emancipation reform of 1861.

They moved to Moscow in 1821. By the mid-1830s their home, informally known as the "Republic at the Red Gate", had become a major center of Moscow's cultural life. People of widely differing viewpoints would all receive a sympathetic hearing. In the summer, they would hold their salons at various estates near Moscow. She was also an active participant in public life, helping her son Ivan publish his magazine,

The European, and protesting on behalf of the philosopher Pyotr Chaadayev, who was censored and declared insane.

Her last years were spent on an estate near Utkino, not far from where she was born; spending only the winters in Moscow. In 1873, her son Nikolai was elected head of the nobility in the Belyovsky District, and she began spending her winters in Belyov. After his sudden death, she moved to Dorpat to live with her son Vasily, and died there the following year. She was buried in Petrishchevo.
