= Russian cosmism =

Russian philosophical and cultural movement

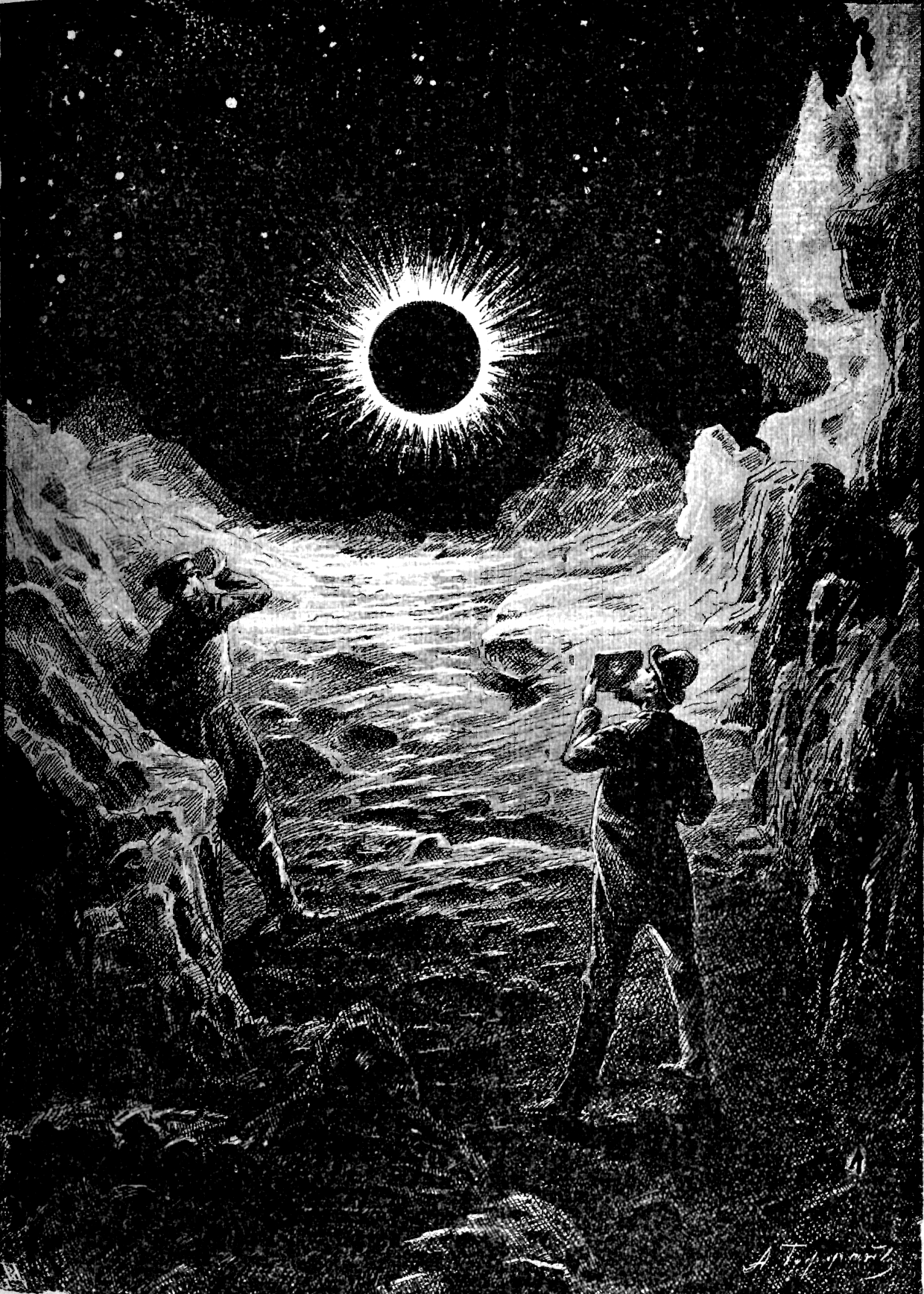
An illustration to Tsiolkovsky's educational science fiction story On the Moon (1893)

Russian cosmism (Russian: Русский космизм), or simply cosmism, is a philosophical and cultural movement that emerged in late 19th- and early 20th-century Russia, integrating science, religion, and metaphysics into a unified worldview. It is characterized by the belief in humanity's cosmic destiny, the potential for immortality, and the use of scientific and technological advancements to achieve control over nature and explore space.

At the beginning of the 20th century, there was a burst of scientific investigation into interplanetary travel, largely driven by fiction writers such as Jules Verne and H. G. Wells, which would influence philosophical movements like Russian cosmism. The movement was also influenced by Eastern Orthodox thought, Russian philosophy, and advancements in natural sciences. Key figures in Russian cosmism include Nikolai Fedorov, who advocated for the abolition of death and resurrection of ancestors through scientific means; and Konstantin Tsiolkovsky, whose work in astronautics and space travel laid the foundations for modern cosmonautics. Other notable thinkers, such as Vladimir Vernadsky and Alexander Chizhevsky, contributed ideas on the noosphere, biosphere, and cosmic influences on human life.

Although suppressed during the Soviet era, cosmism influenced Soviet space exploration, transhumanism, and later philosophical movements. In the 21st century, Russian cosmism has gained renewed interest, particularly in discussions on space colonization, technological immortality, and the role of humanity in the universe.

== Theory ==
Cosmism entailed a broad theory of natural philosophy, combining elements of religion and ethics with a history and philosophy of the origin, evolution, and future existence of the cosmos and humankind. It combined elements from both Eastern and Western philosophical traditions as well as from the Russian Orthodox Church.

The Culture of Health is the basic science about Spiritual Humanity. It studies the perspectives of harmonious development of Spiritual man and Spiritual ethnos as a conscious creator of the State of Light into the territory of the Solar System

— Victor Skumin

Cosmism was one of the influences on Proletkult, and after the October Revolution, the term came to be applied to "...the poetry of such writers as Mikhail Gerasimov and Vladimir Kirillov...: emotional paeans to physical labor, machines, and the collective of industrial workers ... organized around the image of the universal 'Proletarian', who strides forth from the earth to conquer planets and stars." This form of cosmism, along with the writings of Nikolai Fyodorov, was a strong influence on Andrei Platonov.

Many ideas of the Russian cosmists were later developed by those in the transhumanist movement. Victor Skumin argues that the Culture of Health will play an important role in the creation of a human spiritual society into the Solar System.

== Branches ==
Russian cosmism can be divided into two categories: scientific and philosophical. While the scientific branch is naturalistic, the philosophical branch is mystical and metaphysical, yet both branches are inherently spiritual. This is particularly evident among early Russian cosmists who followed in the footsteps of spiritual thinkers like Fyodorov and Solovyov. For a more nuanced categorization, there is often a third category mentioned by scholars: the artistic branch.

=== The philosophical branch ===
Nikolai Fyodorovich Fyodorov (1828–1903) is regarded as the father of Russian cosmism and its most representative figure. The major idea associated with Fyodorov is the philosophy of Humankind's Common Task, which meant "to regulate the forces of nature, to defeat death and bring ancestors back to life so that they too would participate in the general resurrection."

This idea was so central to his philosophy that "whatever topic he wrote about, Fedorov brought in his main idea of the Common Task—how to achieve universal brotherhood, rationalise nature instead of merely exploiting her bounties, overcome death, resurrect the ancestors and create a united humanity worthy of governing the universe." The sense of urgency for uniting for a common task is a theme that exists in one way or another in the works of all Russian cosmists.

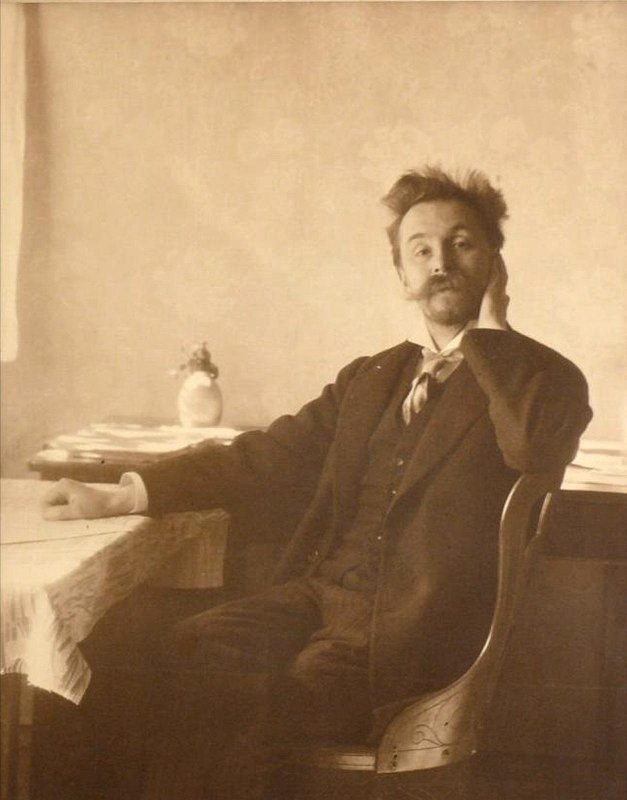
Alexander Scriabin as a Russian cosmist

=== The artistic branch ===
Alexander Scriabin, who was inspired by the Russian cosmist ideas of his day, sought to unite humanity for a common task much like Fyodorov. He can be regarded as the most representative member of the artistic branch of Russian cosmism. Scriabin's vision was to use artistic means to achieve Cosmist ends. His artistic vision, which was grounded in philosophy and spirituality, can be most clearly observed in his project Mysterium.

=== The scientific branch ===
In 1881, Russian revolutionary and rocket pioneer Nikolai Kibalchich proposed an idea of pulsed rocket propulsion by combustion of explosives, which was an early precursor for Project Orion.

Konstantin Tsiolkovsky (1857–1935) was among the pioneers of theoretical space exploration and cosmonautics. In 1903, Tsiolkovsky published the first serious scientific work on space travel. His work was essentially unknown outside the Russian Empire, but inside the country it inspired further research, experimentation and the formation of the Society for Studies of Interplanetary Spaceflight. Tsiolkovsky wrote a book called "The Will of the Universe; Unknown Intelligent Forces" in which he propounded a philosophy of panpsychism. He believed humans would eventually colonize the Milky Way. His thought preceded the Space Age by several decades, and some of what he foresaw in his imagination has come to pass since his death. Tsiolkovsky did not believe in traditional religious cosmology, but instead he believed in a cosmic being that governed humans.

=== Other cosmists ===
Alexander Bogdanov (1873–1928) was a Russian and later Soviet physician, philosopher, science fiction writer, and Bolshevik revolutionary. His wide scientific and medical interests ranged from universal systems theory to the possibility of human rejuvenation through blood transfusion. He saw heterochronic blood transfusions as an alliance of solidarity between the generations, where the old benefited from the rejuvenating effects of the young blood, while the young received immunities from the elders' blood. Ironically, he died as a result of a hemolytic transfusion reaction. His successors put Russia in the forefront of the development of centralized national blood transfusion services.

Other cosmists included Vladimir Vernadsky (1863–1945), who developed the notion of a noosphere, and Alexander Chizhevsky (1897–1964), pioneer of "heliobiology" (study of the sun's effect on biology). A minor planet, 3113 Chizhevskij, discovered by Soviet astronomer Nikolai Stepanovich Chernykh in 1978, is named after him.

Russian paleontologist and sci-fi writer Ivan Yefremov developed the idea of cosmism and concluded that communism was a necessary structure for any future society which wants to survive in space. The successor of the traditions of Ivan Yefremov was geologist and sci-fi writer Alexander Shalimov. The astrophysicist Nikolai Aleksandrovich Kozyrev was the discoverer of Lunar tectonic activity (1959) and author of Causal Mechanics/Theory of Time.

== Gallery of Russian cosmists ==
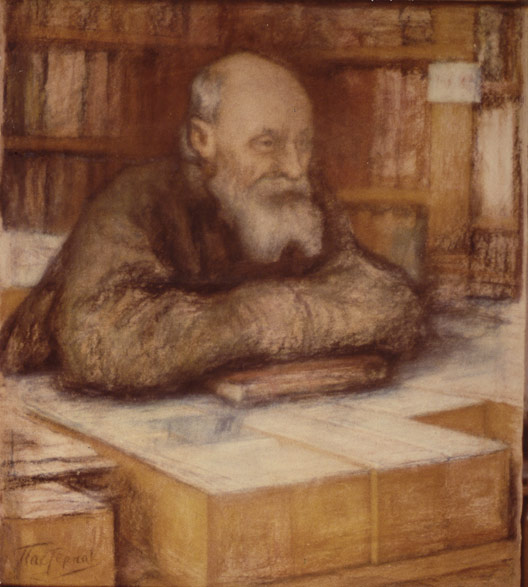
Nikolai Fyodorov

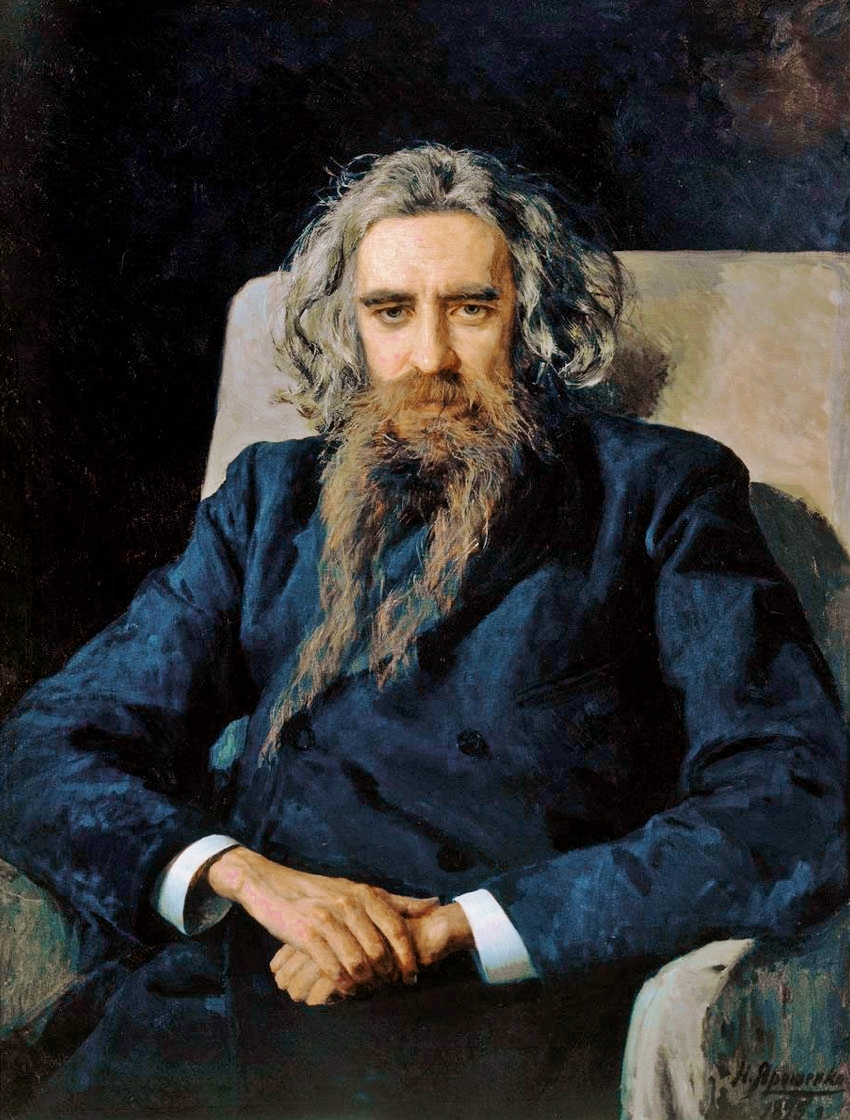
Vladimir Solovyov

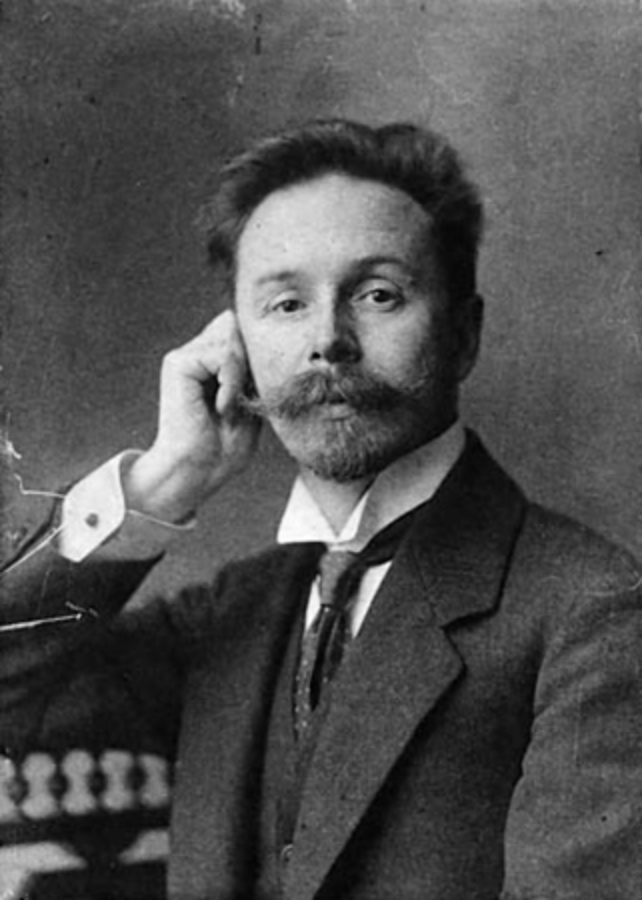
Alexander Scriabin

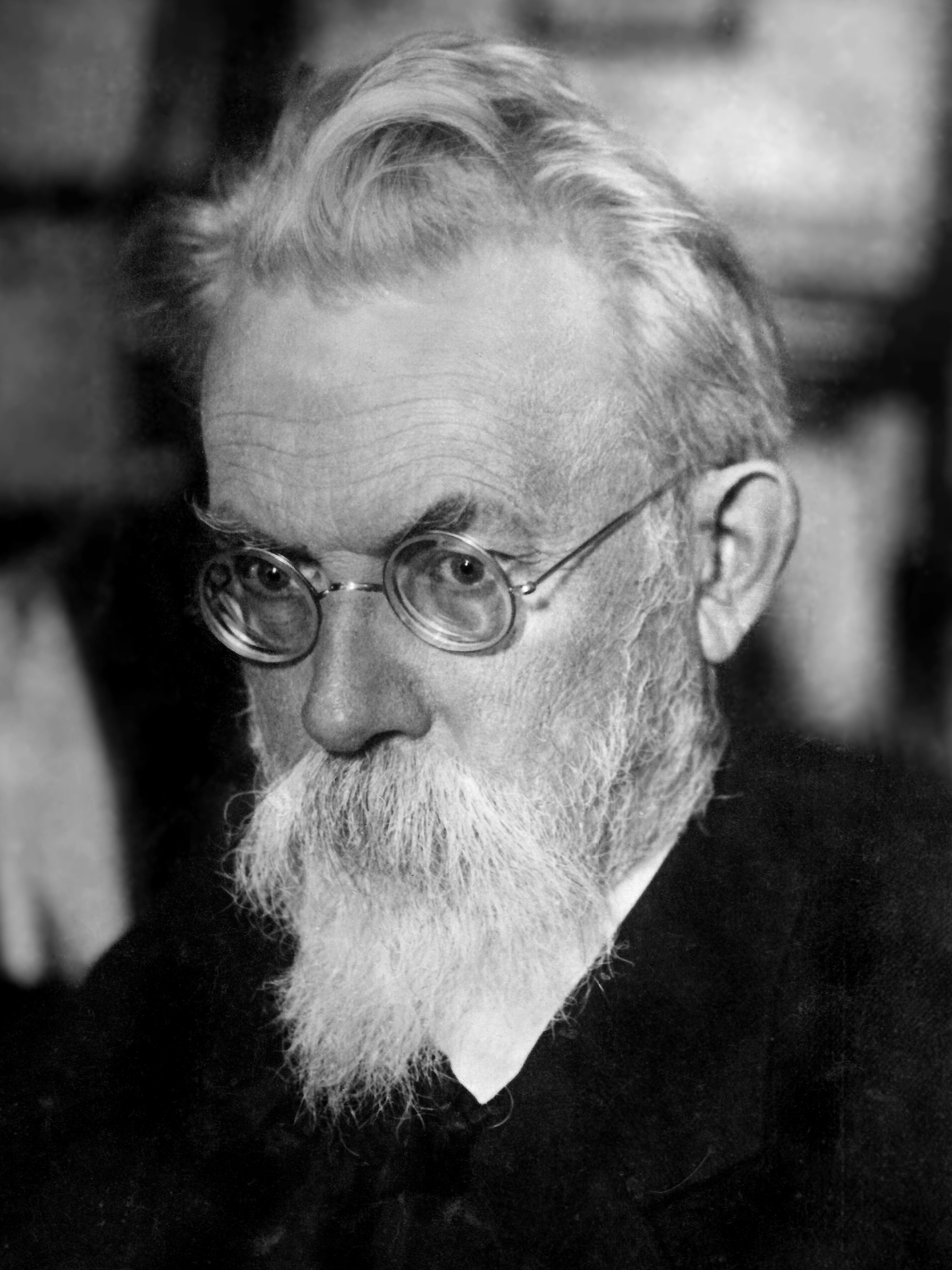
Vladimir Vernadsky

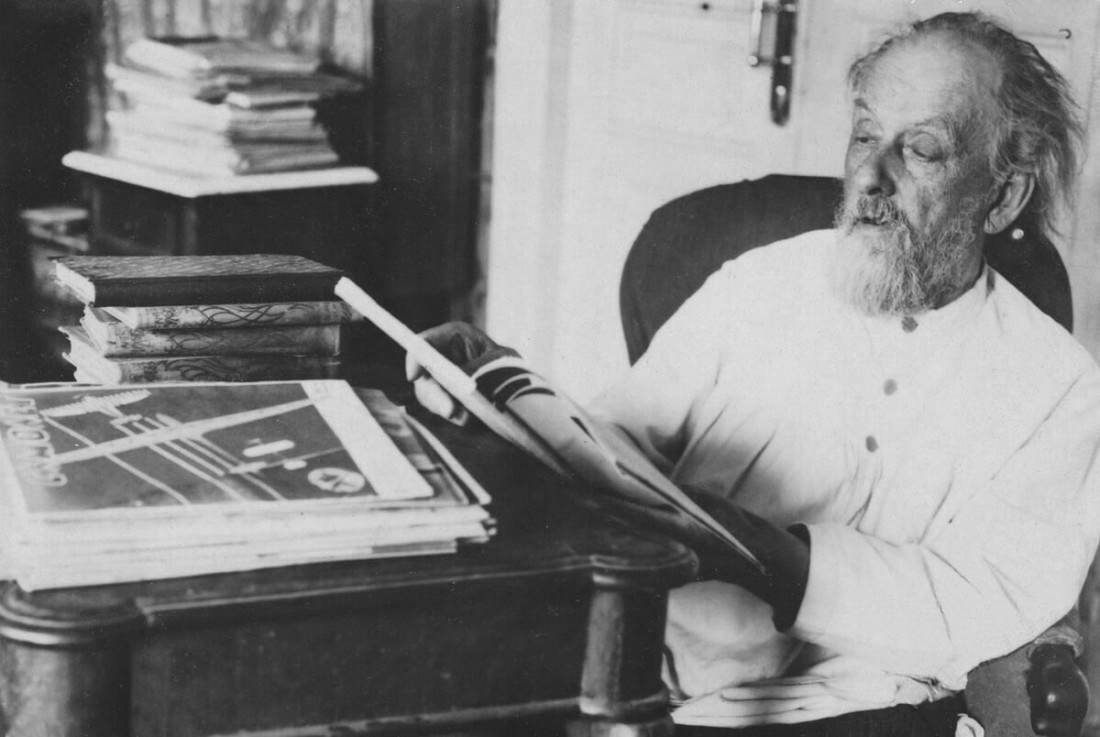
Konstantin Tsiolkovsky

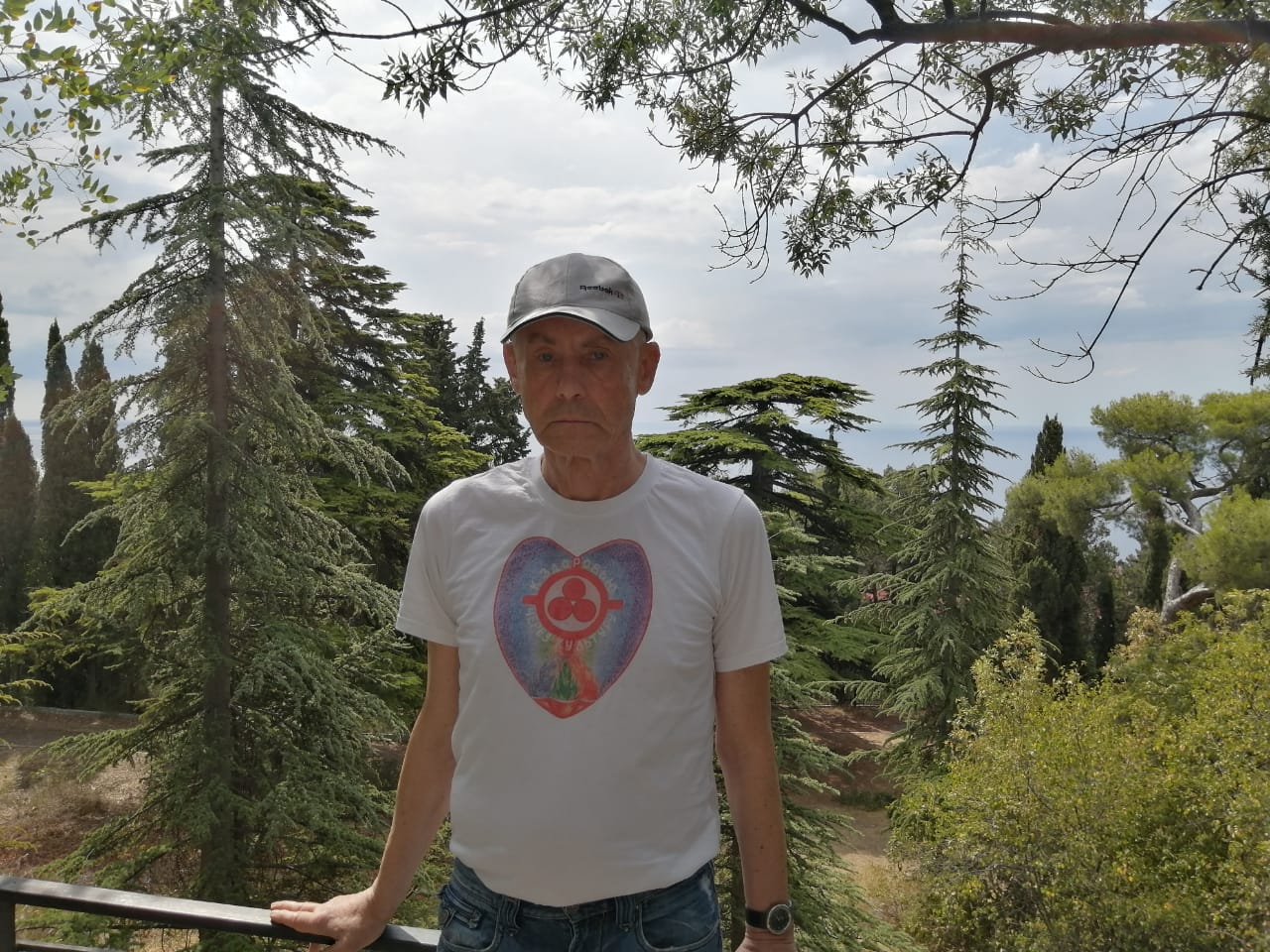
Victor Skumin

== See also ==
- Agni Yoga
- Biosphere
- Cosmology
- Philosophy of cosmos
- New Age
- Pantheism
- Proletkult
- Roerichism
- Resurrection of the dead
- Russian Futurism
- Russian philosophy
- Science and technology in Russia
- Science fiction
- Sobornost
- Soviet space program
- Space colonization
- Technological resurrection
