= Pyotr Kikin =

General of Russian Imperial Army

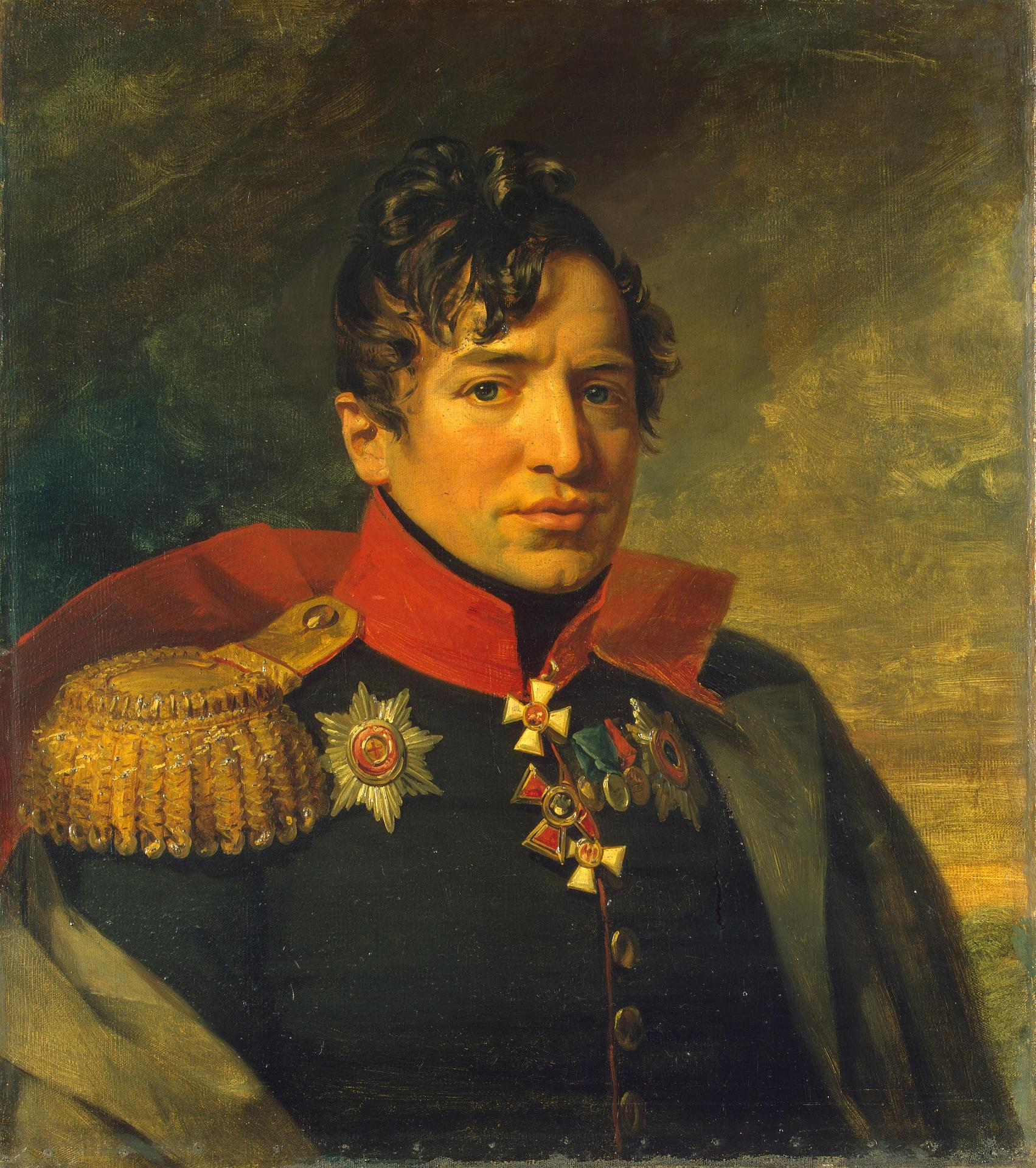
Portrait by George Dawe

Pyotr Andreyevich Kikin (Russian: Пётр Андре́евич Ки́кин; 27 December 1775, Alatyr – 18 May 1834, Saint Petersburg?) was a Russian general and a Secretary of State under Tsar Alexander I.

== Biography ==
He was one of twelve children born to Major Andrei Kikin (1747-1790) and his wife Maria Yermolova (1754-1819). His baptismal name was Bartholomei, but he never used it. As soon as he was old enough to take some responsibility, he was enrolled in the Guards and was a sergeant by the age of ten. He later studied in a boarding school at Moscow University and began his regular military career as an ensign in the Semyonovsky Regiment. From 1806 to 1812, he fought in the Russo-Turkish War, serving as an adjutant under General Michelson.

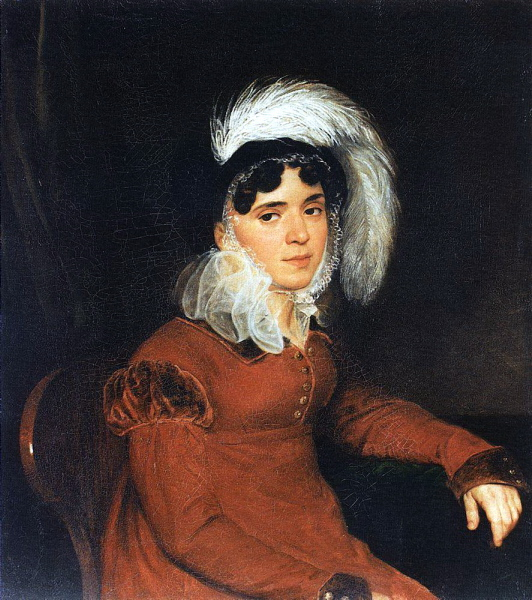
Kikin's wife, Maria (1787-1828). Portrait by Karl Bryullov, one of the first painters to benefit from Kikin's art society

He was promoted to colonel and almost immediately became involved in the French invasion of Russia, serving in the First Western Army. He was wounded in the eye at the Battle of Valutino and was injured in a counter-attack at the Battle of Borodino, but was still able to fight at the Battle of Krasnoi. In 1813, he was awarded the Order of St. George of the Third Degree and the Order of St. Alexander Nevsky. From 1813 to 1814, he commanded a brigade under Field Marshal Wittgenstein and distinguished himself at the Battle of Lützen.

After completing that campaign, he retired from military service. Until the invasion, he had been considered a Francophile, but his wartime experiences brought a new perspective. After reading the "Discourse on Old and New Styles" by Alexander Shishkov, he became a committed Slavophile; joining the "Lovers of the Russian Word" society. He also wrote a letter to Shishkov, suggesting a memorial to celebrate the victory over Napoleon, which is sometimes cited as the inspiration for the Cathedral of Christ the Saviour, but this is far from certain.

In 1816, at the request of Tsar Alexander, Count Aleksey Arakcheyev convinced Kikin to reenter government service and he was appointed Secretary of State in charge of reviewing petitions to the Tsar. In this post, he was distinguished by his candor and firmness and was not afraid to disagree with the Tsar when he thought his decisions were unfair.

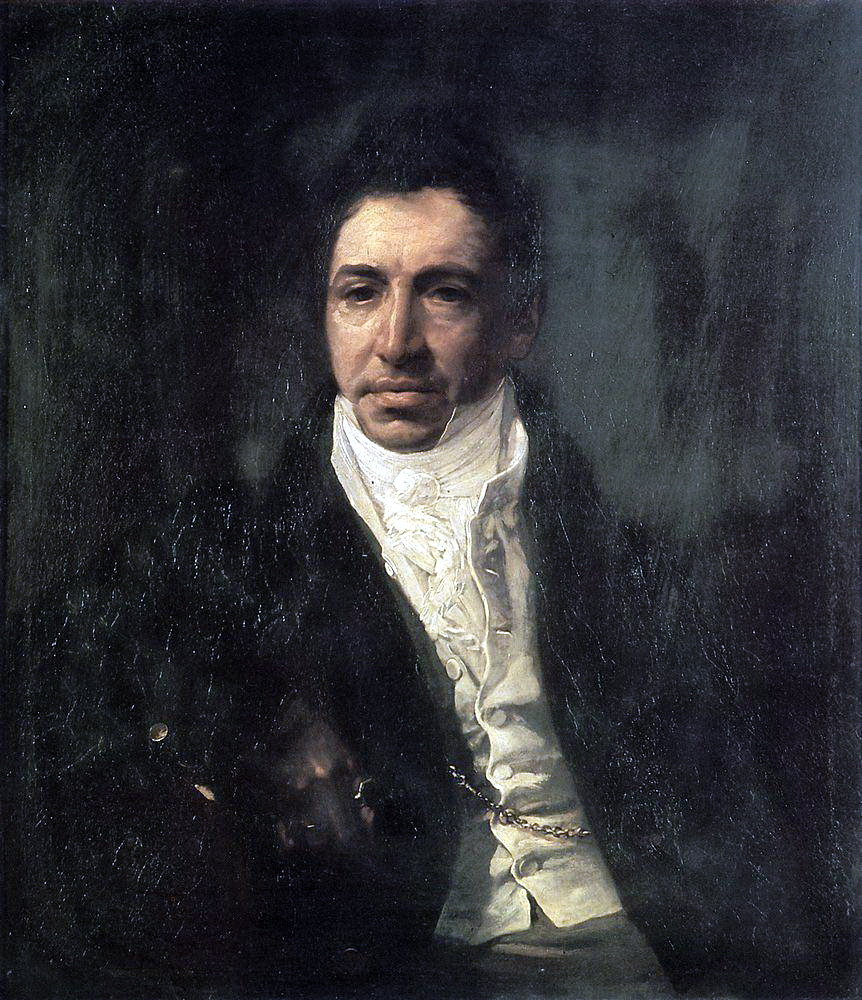
Portrait of Kikin as Secretary of State, by Bryullov

In 1820, together with Ivan Alexeyevich Gagarin and Alexander Ivanovich Dmitriev-Mamonov, he became a founding patron of the "Society for the Encouragement of Artists" and served as its first chairman.

He was also a farmer, making many improvements to an estate in Ryazan Governorate that he acquired from his wealthy mother-in-law, Ekaterina Torsukova, and taking an active part in the affairs of the "Moscow Society of Agriculture". He published several essays on agricultural topics, attempted to improve the lives of farm laborers and experimented with new methods for tanning sheepskins.

In 1826, he resigned his position as Secretary of State and retired permanently from public life, although he became an active member of the Free Economic Society. His place of death is not known for certain, but he is buried at the Tikhvin Cemetery in Saint Petersburg. In the early 20th-century, his estate was restored by the former Minister of Agriculture, Alexey Sergeyevich Yermolov, who was also a Society member and a distant relative on his mother's side of the family.
