= Alexander Ivanovich Dmitriev-Mamonov =

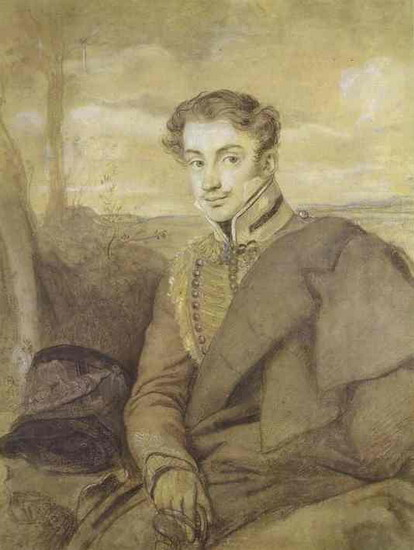
Alexander Dmitriev-Mamonov; portrait by Orest Kiprensky.

Alexander Ivanovich Dmitriev-Mamonov (Russian: Александр Иванович Дмитриев-Мамонов; 24 December 1787 in Saint Petersburg – 9 December 1836 in Moscow) was the commander of a Belarusian Hussar regiment and a battle painter.

== Biography ==
He was born into a noble family and was the son of Major-General Ivan Dmitriev-Mamonov. His mother, Mariya, died when he was only seven and his father remarried into the Tolstoy family. Most sources say that his father's second wife, Yelena, was his mother.

After 1806, he served as an actuary at the Collegium of Foreign Affairs, then moved to the State Chancellery.

In 1812, he joined the People's Militia in Moscow. He received the rank of Lieutenant and served in the battles of Ostrovno, Valutino, Borodino and Krasnoi. In 1813, he was assigned to a Hussar regiment, commanded by General Pyotr Palen, that followed Napoleon's retreating army and participated in numerous battles before reaching Paris.

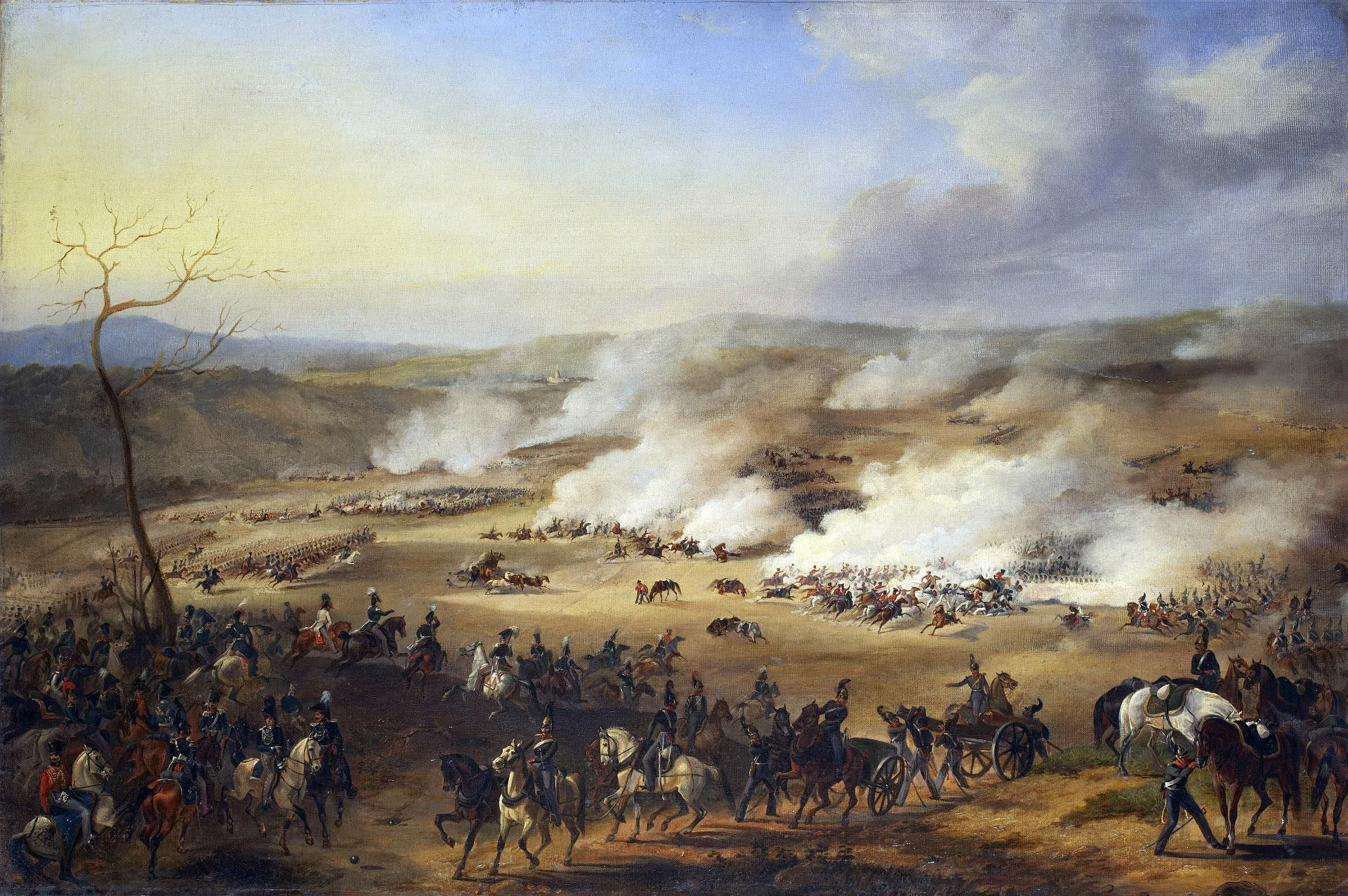
The Battle of Fère-Champenoise

In 1816, he became an adjutant to General Nikita Volkonsky and promotions followed rapidly. By 1823, he had been promoted to Colonel and left the General's service. He had several friends among the Decembrists and the courage to speak out on behalf of those who had been exiled or placed in custody. In 1827, he was given command of a Hussar regiment and, in 1830, took part in suppressing the November Uprising. The following year, he was promoted to Major-General. Over the next few years, he commanded light cavalry and Uhlan regiments, as well as the Hussars.

In addition to his military activities, he was an amateur artist and brought back numerous sketches from the battles he had seen during the Napoleonic campaigns. In 1820, he was one of the founders of the Imperial Society for the Encouragement of the Arts, together with Ivan Gagarin and Pyotr Kikin. Seven years later, he established a drawing school. Many of his sketches and watercolors are displayed in the buildings at Tsarskoye Selo.

In 1835, he moved into the civil service and became a State Councillor at the Ministry of Internal Affairs. The awards he received during his military career include the Order of Saint Vladimir, Order of Saint Anna, the Medal "For the Capture of Paris" and the order Pour le Mérite.

His wife, Sofia, was maid of honor to Maria Feodorovna. His son, Emmanuil, was a portrait painter, art historian and noted Slavophile.
