= Marguerite Georges =

French actress (c. 1787 – 1867)

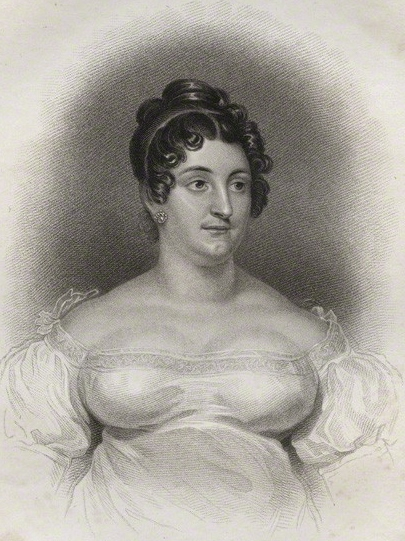
- Born: Marguerite-Josephine Weimer c. 1787; Bayeux, France
- Died: 1867; Passy, France
- Occupation: Actress
- Known for: One of the most important actresses in European romanticism, playing in theatres throughout Europe and received at several royal courts; royal mistress
- Partner(s): Napoleon; Duke of Wellington (claimed)

Marguerite Georges (c. 1787 – 1867) was a French stage actress. She was one of the most famous French actresses of her time. She is also known for her affair with Napoleon, but also claimed to have had an affair with the Duke of Wellington, a claim which is considered probable by some historians. Others refute these claims. She published under the name Marguerite-Josephine Weimer George.

== Biography ==
Marguerite Georges was born Marguerite-Josephine Weimer in Bayeux, the daughter of a German employed in the theatre orchestra in Amiens. She debuted on stage in 1802 at the age of fifteen at the Théâtre Français in Paris; she was made sociétaire in 1804. Her affair with Napoleon took place between 1802 and 1804, and was rumoured to be the reason she left France in 1808.

She was active in Saint Petersburg in Russia in 1808–1812, debuting at St. Petersburg, in Phèdre, and alternating nights with the Russian actress Ekaterina Semenova. She toured Europe in 1812–1813, during which she performed at the Royal Dramatic Theatre in Stockholm and Dresden. She then returned to France. She was active at the Théatre Français in 1813–1818, at the Odéon Theatre and in 1831–49 at the Théâtre de la Porte Saint-Martin. Her affair with Wellington is supposed to have taken place in 1814, and would make her one of two women known to have shared the two opponents' beds, the other one being Giuseppina Grassini. Unlike Grassini, she was indiscreet enough in later life to compare their sexual performances, her opinion being that "Monsieur le Duc était de beaucoup le plus fort" ("The Duke was by far the stronger").

She lived at 25 Rue Madame, but moved to a boarding house at Rue de Helder. She retired in 1853, and received a pension from Jérôme Bonaparte, Napoleon's brother. She died in Passy.

== Sources ==
- "Жорж, Маргарита Жозефина" . Brockhaus and Efron Encyclopedic Dictionary (in Russian). 1906.
