= Ekaterina Semenova =

Russian actress

Yekaterina Semyonova
- Екатерина Семёнова
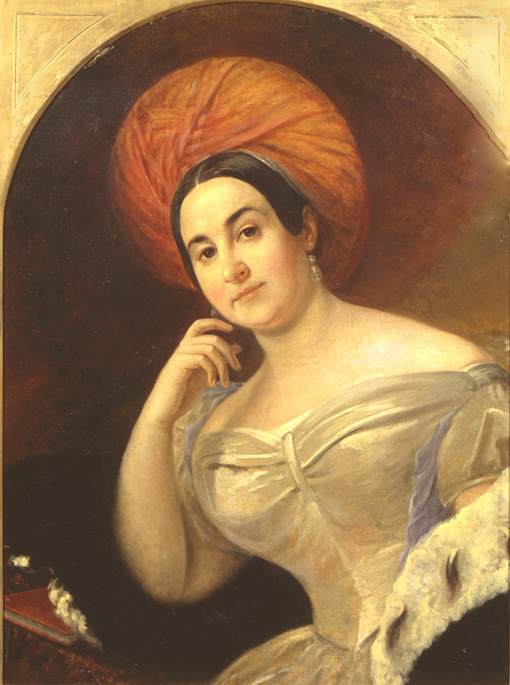
- Portrait by an unknown artist
- Born: Yekaterina Semyonovna Semyonova; 18 November 1786; Russian Empire
- Died: 13 March 1849 (aged 62); Saint Petersburg, Russian Empire
- Occupation: Actress

Ekaterina Semenova (Russian: Екатерина Семёновна Семёнова; 18 November 1786 – 13 March 1849) was a Russian actress.

== Life ==
Semenova became a student in the Saint Petersburg Theatre School in 1790 where she was instructed by Ivan Dmitrevsky and debuted at the stage in 1797. She eventually became the leading interpreter of plays of William Shakespeare, Jean Racine, Friedrich Schiller and Vladislav Ozerov. She was coached by director Prince Alexander Shakhovskoy and the poet Nikolay Gnedich.

Semenova was admired for her beauty, deep voice and passionate way of acting. She was mentioned in the poems of Alexander Pushkin, but also talked about because of her rivalry with Marguerite Georges, who was very popular in the Russian Empire at the time.

She retired in 1820, but returned in 1822 and made a great success with Phèdre in 1823. In 1828, Semenova married Prince Ivan Alexeyevich Gagarin and afterwards only performed in private theatres.

== Sources ==
- Uglow, Jennifer S. The Macmillan Dictionary of Women's Biography.
