= Ivan Alexeyevich Gagarin =

Russian Imperial Senator and Active Privy Councillor

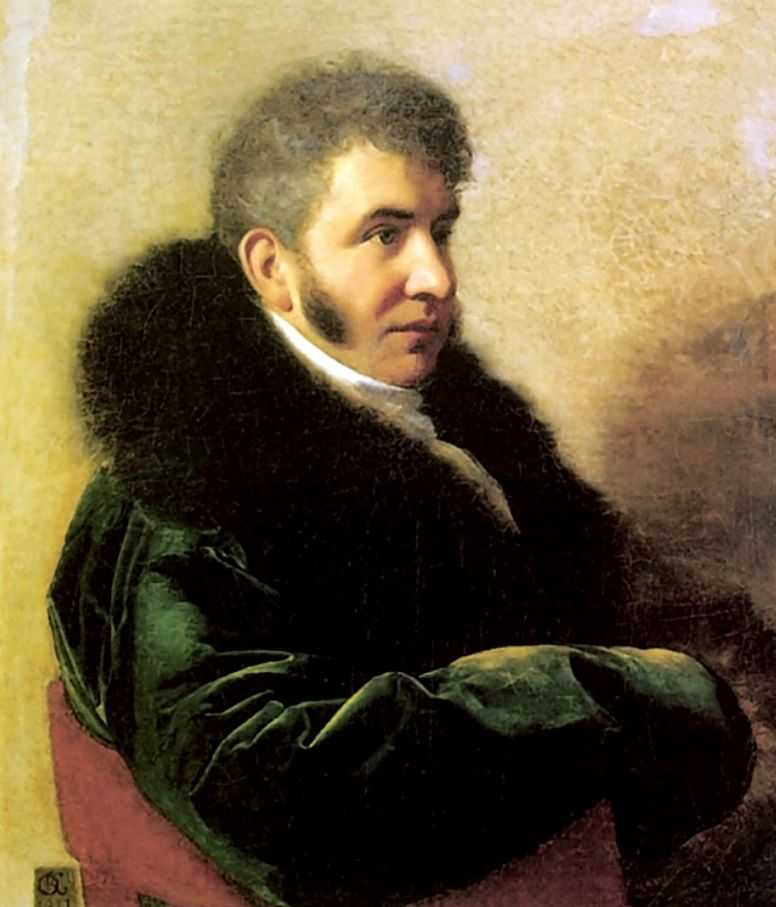
Ivan Alexeyevich Gagarin; portrait by Orest Kiprensky (1811)

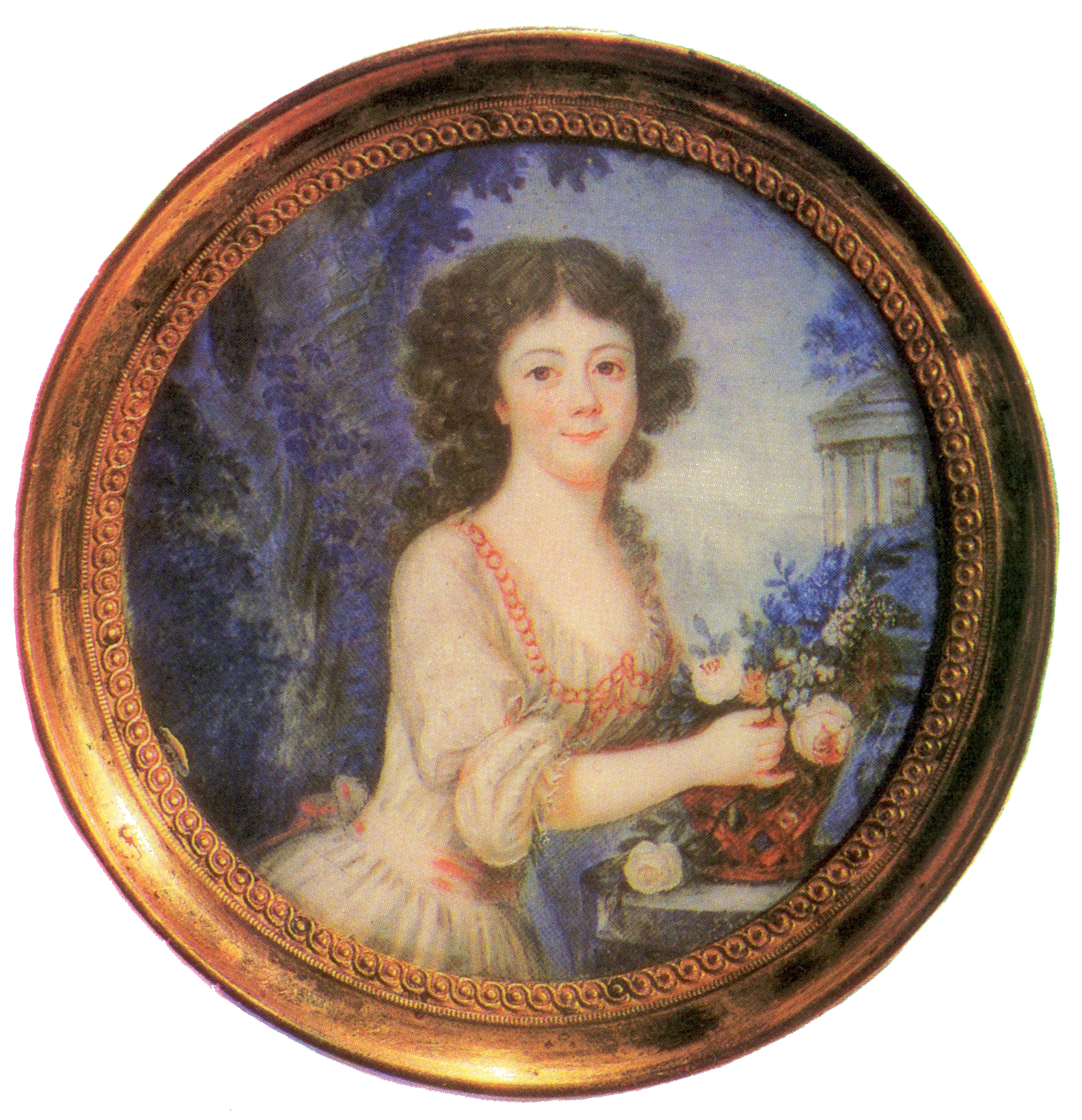
His first wife, Elizaveta; miniature by A. F. G. Viollier (1750-1829)

Ivan Alexeyevich Gagarin (Russian: Иван Алексеевич Гагарин; 16 September 1771, Moscow – 12 October 1832, Moscow) was a Russian Imperial Senator and Active Privy Councillor, from the princely Gagarin family.

== Biography ==
He was born to the Privy Councilor, Alexei Ivanovich Gagarin, and his wife, Irina Grigorievna, daughter of the military officer and statesman, Grigory Alexeyevich Urusov. At the age of only two, he was enrolled in the Preobrazhensky Regiment then, at the age of five, in the Izmaylovsky Regiment. When he began his active service, in 1790, he became a Praporshchik (Ensign), and was sent to fight in the Russo-Turkish War. For his participation in the Siege of Izmail, he was promoted to Podporuchik (Second-Lieutenant), and was awarded the Order of St. George, 4th degree. Further promotions followed and, in 1795, he was named a Chamberlain.

In 1799, he was appointed an Equerry at the court of Grand Duchess Elena Pavlovna and later held the same position under Grand Duchess Catherine Pavlovna. In 1810, he was appointed Manager of her court in Tver. For his many years of service, he was awarded the Order of Saint Anna and the Order of Saint Alexander Nevsky. In 1819, he was named a Senator.

In the latter part of 1820, together with Pyotr Andreyevich Kikin and Alexander Dmitriev-Mamonov, he was instrumental in founding the Imperial Society for the Encouragement of the Arts; dedicated to "promoting the dissemination of fine arts in Russia; approving and encouraging the talents of Russian artists". He served as one of the first members of its governing committee.

In 1826, for thirty-five years of service, he was awarded the Order of Saint Vladimir and, the following year, was appointed to the Supreme Criminal Court, charged with judging the Decembrists. He died in 1832, aged sixty-one, and was interred in the cemetery at Novospassky Monastery.

He was married twice; first, in 1796, to Elizaveta Ivanovna Balabina (1773–1803), daughter of General Ivan Balabin and sister of Lieutenant-General Pyotr Balabin. They had six sons and she died in childbirth. Their fifth son was General Alexander Gagarin. His second wife (1828) was the actress, Ekaterina Semenova; his longtime mistress. They are known to have had three daughters and one son.
