= Belyovsky Uyezd =

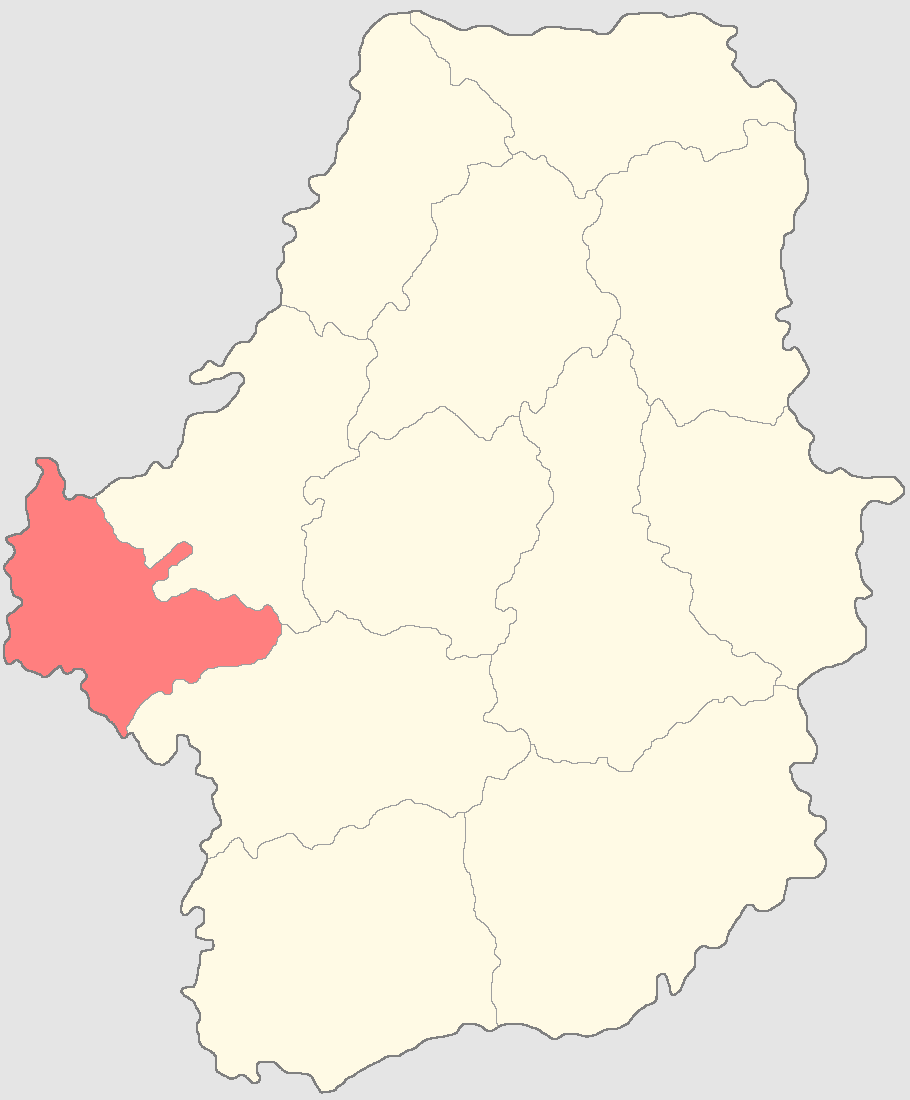
The historical boundaries of Belyovsky Uyezd

Belyovsky Uyezd (Белёвский уезд) was one of the subdivisions of the Tula Governorate of the Russian Empire. It was situated in the western part of the governorate. Its administrative centre was Belyov.

== Demographics ==
At the time of the Russian Empire Census of 1897, Belyovsky Uyezd had a population of 78,289. Of these, 99.9% spoke Russian as their native language.
