= Pyotr Bessonov =

Russian folklorist

- Пётр Бессонов
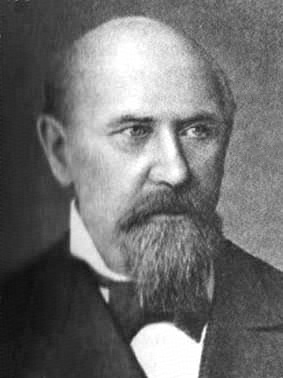
- Pyotr Alexeyevich Bessonov
- Born: June 16, 1827; Moscow
- Died: March 6, 1898 (aged 70); Kharkiv
- Education: Imperial Moscow University (1851)
- Scientific career
- Fields: Philology

Pyotr Alexeyevich Bessonov or (in the pre-1917 spelling) Bezsonov (Пётр Алексе́евич Бессо́нов; 1828–1898) was a leading Russian folklorist who collected and published many East Slavic and South Slavic folk songs.

The son of a priest, Bessonov was born in Moscow. He graduated at Moscow University in 1851. After five years of graduate work in ancient and modern languages, he earned the government printing commission. From 1864 to 1867 he was supervisor of the Vilna Museum and Public Library, besides serving as director of education in the same city. For the two following years he was librarian at Moscow University.

Having received an honorary doctor's diploma in Slavonic philology from Kazan University, he became professor of Slavic languages at the University of Kharkov in 1879, remaining in the position till his death. He published:

- Bolgarskiya Pyesni (1855), the first great collection of Bulgarian folk songs
- a collection of Serbian folk songs, under the title Lazarica (1857)
- Pyotr Kireevsky's collections of Russian songs (1861–71)
- a number of treatises on the Bulgarian, Serbian, and Russian languages and literature

== Bibliography ==
- Imperial Moscow University: 1755-1917: encyclopedic dictionary. Moscow: Russian political encyclopedia (ROSSPEN). 2010. pp. 65–66. ISBN 978-5-8243-1429-8 – via A. Andreev, D. Tsygankov.
