= Imperial Society for the Encouragement of the Arts =

Society for art promotion in Saint Petersburg, Imperial Russia

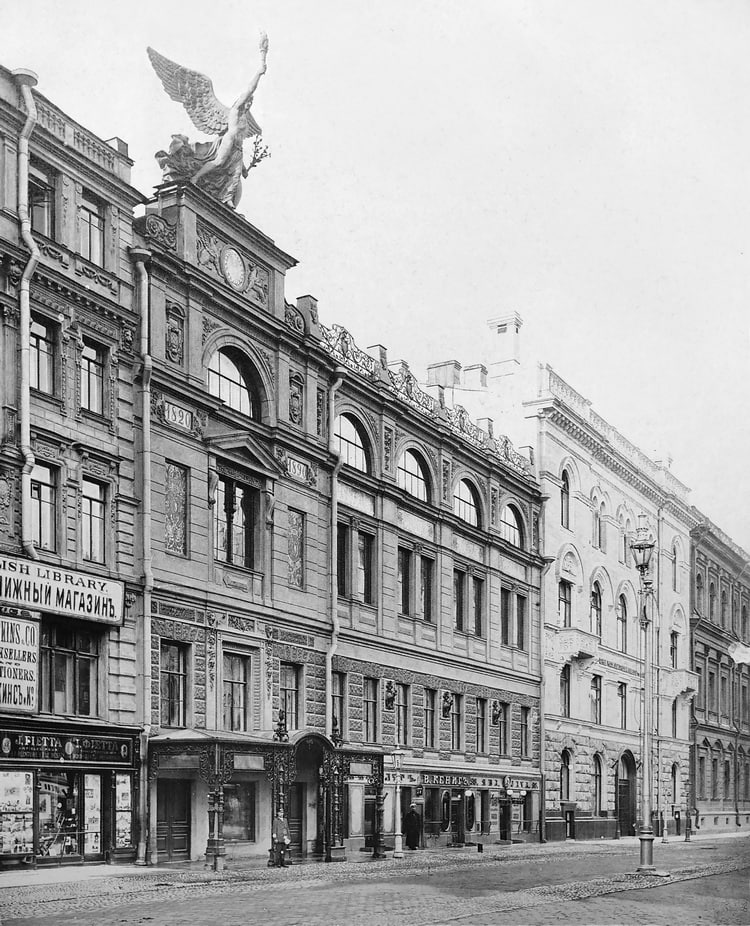
The Society's building in 1912, on Bolshaya Morskaya in Saint Petersburg; currently occupied by the Russian Artists' Union. It is a registered monument of the "Cultural Heritage of the Russian Federation"

The Imperial Society for the Encouragement of the Arts (Russian: Императорское общество поощрения художеств (ОПХ)) was an organization devoted to promoting the arts that existed in Saint Petersburg from 1820 to 1929. It was the oldest society of its kind in Russia. Until 1882 it was called the "Society for the Encouragement of Artists". After 1917, it became the "All-Russian Society for the Encouragement of the Arts".

== History ==
The Society was founded by a group of influential patrons (including Ivan Alexeyevich Gagarin, Pyotr Andreyevich Kikin and Alexander Dmitriev-Mamonov) with the aim of assisting development in the fine arts, the diffusion of knowledge related to the arts, and the education of painters and sculptors. In 1833, Tsar Nicholas I formally confirmed the Society's existence by law and placed it under his personal protection.

Before then, many young artists benefited from Society grants that enabled them to study overseas. Among them were Karl Bryullov and Alexander Brullov in 1822, Alexander Ivanov in 1827 and Alexey Tyranov in 1830. During the Society's existence, many students of the Imperial Academy of Arts also received financial support, including Vasily Vereshchagin, Firs Zhuravlev, Peter Clodt von Jürgensburg, Mikhail Clodt, Ivan Kramskoi, Lev Lagorio, Kirill Lemokh, Konstantin Makovsky, Leonid Solomatkin, Konstantin Flavitsky and Pavel Chistyakov.

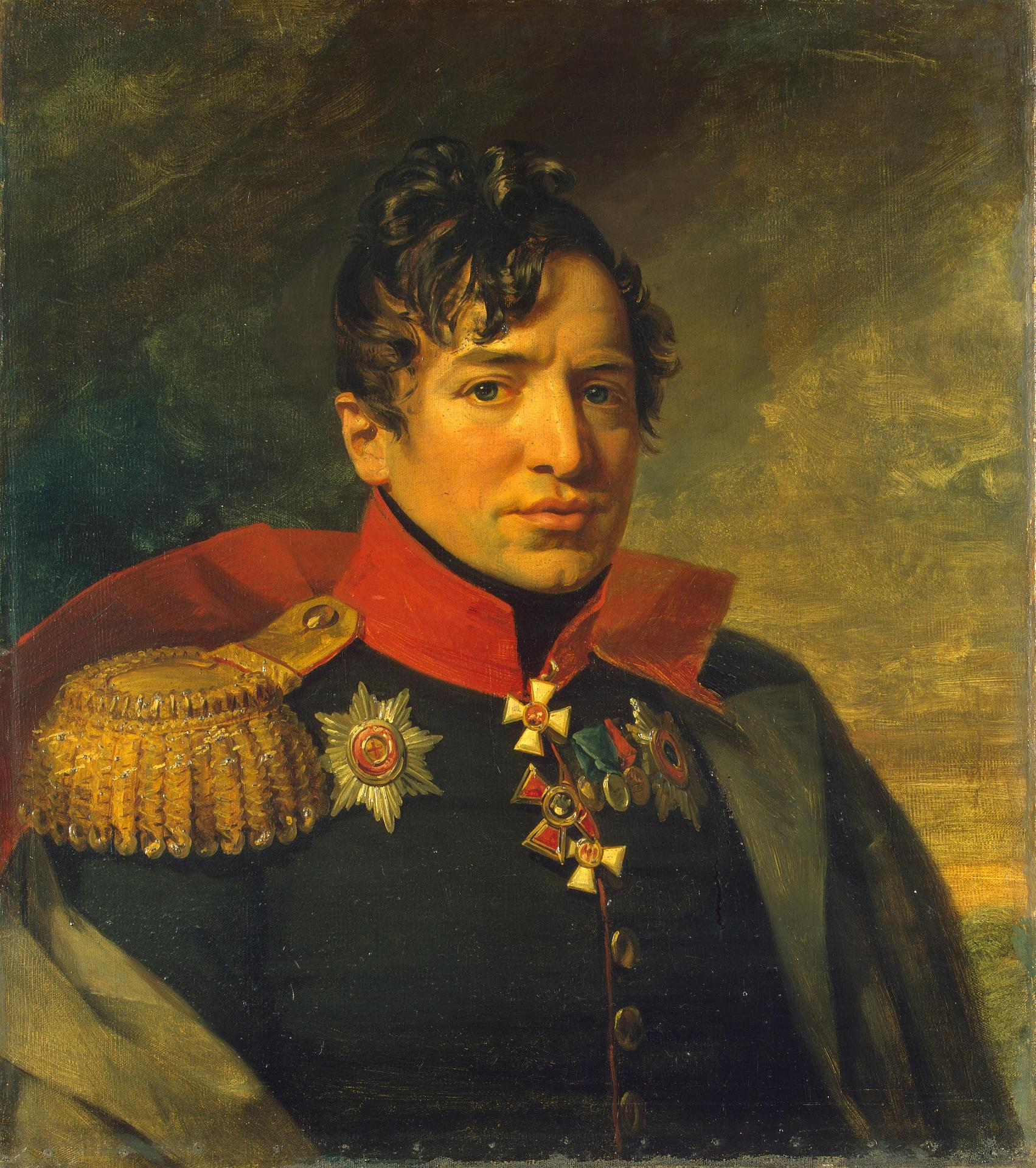
Pyotr Andreyevich Kikin, founding patron and first Chairman of the Society. Portrait by George Dawe

The Society provided a school with workshops, a library, an exhibition hall and (after 1870, when it moved into permanent quarters) a museum, as well as playing a key role in disseminating copies of artists' works through etchings, lithographs and woodcuts. In 1860, the Society established an annual competition for painting and the applied arts, with cash awards and prizes sponsored by prominent patrons of the arts. The "Vasily Botkin Prize" was for general painting, the "Sergei Grigoryevich Stroganov Prize" was for landscapes, the "Pavel Sergeyevich Stroganov Prize" was for sculpture, the "Viktor Gayevski Prize" was for history painting, and the "Princess Eugenia Maximilianova Prize" was for woodcuts.

In 1892, the Society began publishing a magazine, Искусство и художественная промышленность (roughly: "Fine and Applied Arts"), which was replaced in 1901 by a monthly journal called Художественные сокровища России (Russian Art Treasures), edited by Alexandre Benois and Adrian Prakhov. That same year, according to the Society's records, their exhibitions had attracted 56,000 visitors, works were sold to the value of 33,900 Rubles and there were 247 participating members.

In fact, after 1840, the Society was managed by various members of the family. Duke Maximilian held that position until 1851; followed by his wife, Grand Duchess Maria Nikolaevna (to 1875); his daughter, Princess Eugenia Maximilianovna (to 1915); and finally by Grand Duke Peter Nikolaevich (to 1917). After the Revolution, the Society gave up its charitable activities and became a sort of art club with educational functions. In 1924, it came under control of the "State Academy of History of Material Culture" (GAIMK), which dissolved the Society in 1929 on the grounds of "non-conformance".

== Drawing School ==
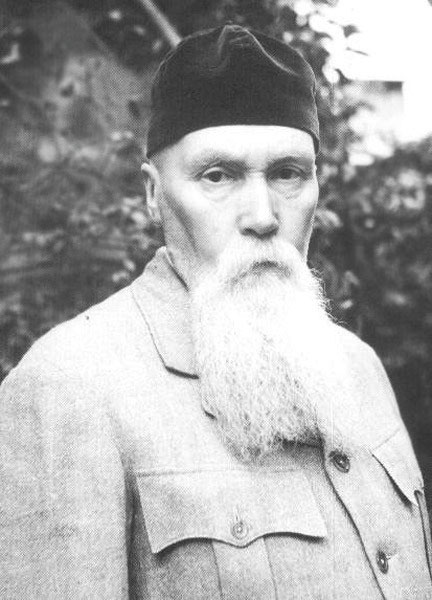
Nicholas Roerich (c.1940)

The Drawing School was created by a decree of Tsar Nicholas I in 1839. At first, the school taught only sketching and drawing. Its objective was to enable artists to participate in crafts and industrial activities, as well as training teachers. Students were admitted all year and the lessons were free, until 1858 (when it was first operated by the Society), after which all but a few especially talented students had to pay a small fee. In 1889, a satellite school for low-income children was opened in the suburbs.

In 1906, Nicholas Roerich was named Director. He created workshops for sewing and weaving, iconography, ceramics and porcelain painting. In addition, he hired well-known artists as instructors, including Ivan Bilibin, Dmitry Kardovsky and Arkady Rylov.

After the October Revolution, all of the school's courses were consolidated into a single course on painting and technical drawing, taught free in a building on Liteyny Avenue. Later, the course was transferred to what became known as the Tavricheskaya Art School.
