= Alexander Chizhevsky =

Russian interdisciplinary scientist (1897–1964)

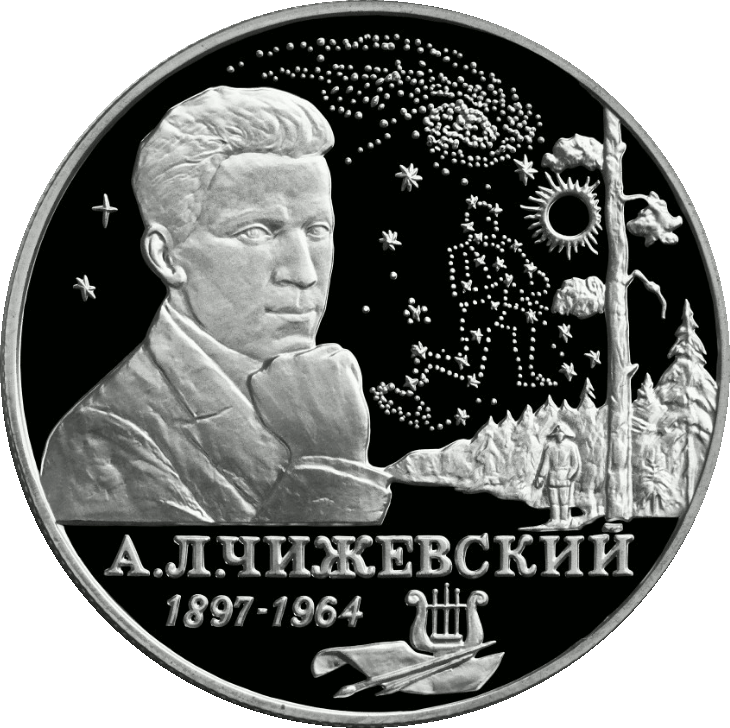
Commemorative coin of the Russian Federation, 1997, dedicated to Chizhevsky

Alexander Leonidovich Chizhevsky (Russian: Алекса́ндр Леони́дович Чиже́вский, IPA: [tɕɪˈʐɛfskʲɪj]; 7 February 1897 – 20 December 1964) was a Soviet-era interdisciplinary scientist, a biophysicist who founded "heliobiology" (study of the Sun's effect on biology) and "aero-ionization" (study of effect of ionization of air on biological entities). He was also noted for his work in "cosmo-biology", biological rhythms and hematology."

Chizhevsky used historical research (historiometry) techniques to link the 11-year solar cycle, Earth’s climate, and the mass activity of peoples.

== Life and career ==
Chizhevsky was born in the town of Tsekhanovets (Ciechanowiec in Polish) in Grodno Governorate of the Russian Empire (now Poland). His father Leonid Vasilievich Chizhevsky was a Russian military general. He spent his early years, and later his teenage years, in Kaluga. As a youth he met Konstantin Tsiolkovsky, a noted space scientist, who also lived in Kaluga. Chizhevsky was educated at the private modern school of F. Shakhmagonov. In 1915 he spent his summer observing the Sun and first hypothesized the effect of periodic changes in solar activity on the organic world. In 1916 he entered World War I as a Russian, fighting on the Galician front and earning a Cross of Saint George. There, he observed directly that battles tended to wax and wane with the strength of solar flares and geomagnetic storms during the concurrent height of solar cycle 15.

In 1918, Chizhevsky graduated from the Moscow Commercial Institute with a degree in archeology. His Moscow State University Doctorate of Philosophy thesis was "On the periodicity of the world-historical process". (He would later call his view point heliotaraxy or heliotaraxia.) He lectured at Moscow University and Moscow Archaeological Institute on the History of Science in the Ancient World and the History of Archaeological Discovery. He attended lectures in physics and mathematics and studied at the Medical Department of Moscow University while working at the Lazarev Biophysical Research Institute. Nobel Prize in Chemistry winner Svante Arrhenius invited Chizhevsky to work for him. At a home laboratory Chizhevsky performed research on the influence of ionized air on animals, establishing the physiological action of negative and positive ions in the air on living organisms. (Negative ions making them more excitable and positive making them more lethargic.) He went on to work in the Duorv Zoo-Psychology Laboratory as a senior scientist and professor. During this time he compiled statistics on biospheric processes and their connection with cycles of solar activity.

In 1926, Chizhevsky worked with Konstantin Tsiolkovsky in the world's first experimental research in the field of space biology. In 1929 he was elected to the Tulan Academy of Sciences and He lectured on biophysics at Columbia University in New York City. In 1931 he set up the Central Research Laboratory for Ionisation in USSR. His work in aero-ionification was supported by the Soviet government and was recognized by a Resolution of the Council of People's Commissars of USSR. In 1935 he discovered the metachromasy of bacteria – the so-called "Chizhevskii-Velkhover effect" – enabling solar emissions that were hazardous to man both on Earth and in space, to be forecast. He was head of two aero-ionisation laboratories. In 1939 he was the Honorary President of the International Congress of Bio-physics held in New York City.

In 1942, Soviet leader Joseph Stalin became aware of Chizhevsky's research work, including Physical Factors Of The Historical Process, and Chizhevsky was asked to retract his writings on solar cycles, which contradicted Soviet theories of the reasons for the Russian revolutions of 1905 and 1917. He refused, was arrested and spent eight years in a forced labor gulag in the Ural Mountains. He was released in 1950 and resettled in Karaganda in Kazakhstan where he underwent eight years of Soviet "rehabilitation" where he conducted science work in coal mines of Karaganda. While he no longer wrote on solar cycle theory, he returned to Moscow and introduced aero-ionic therapy (similar to negative air ionization therapy) into some medical establishments. He became a scientific consultant and ran an aero-ionification laboratory under the USSR State Planning Organisation.

Chizhevsky also was a painter of watercolors shown in Soviet galleries and the composer of hundreds of poems. Chizhevsky died in Moscow in 1964 after a long illness. An "In memoriam" in the International Journal of Biometeorology stated that he had "carved new paths and approaches to the vast expanse of unexplored fields." He is buried in Pyatnitskoye cemetery in Moscow with a headstone featuring an engraved carving representing the Sun.

== Air ioniser ==
In 1918, Chizhevsky created the first air ioniser for ion therapy. It was originally used for animal health in agriculture.

== Sunspots and mass excitability ==
Chizhevsky proposed that not only did geomagnetic storms resulting from sunspot-related solar flares affect electrical usage, plane crashes, epidemics and grasshopper infestations, but human mental life and activity. Increased negative ionization in the atmosphere increased human mass excitability. Chizhevsky proposed that human history is influenced by the eleven-year peaks in sunspot activity, triggering humans en masse to act upon existing grievances and complaints through revolts, revolutions, civil wars and wars between nations.

He analyzed sunspot records (and approximated records), comparing them to riots, revolutions, battles and war in Russia and seventy-one other countries for the period 500 BCE to 1922 CE. (A process known as historiometry.) He found that a significant percent of what he classified as the most important historical events involving large numbers of people occurred around sunspot maximum. Edward R. Dewey, founder of the Foundation for the Study of Cycles, analyzed and published his data in 1951 in the Foundation's publications. In a 1971 book Dewey described the "four components" of Chizhevsky's eleven-year cycle and their approximate lengths: 1) a three-year period of minimum activity characterized by passivity and autocratic rule; 2) a two-year period during which masses begin to organize under new leaders and one theme; 3) a three-year period of maximum excitability, revolution and war; 4) a three-year period of gradual decrease in excitability until the masses are apathetic. Dewey questioned Chizhevsky's theory because in Chizhevsky's data, the sunspot cycle height lagged about a year ahead his "mass excitability index."

In 1992 Arcady A. Putilov, a researcher in Animal and Human Physiology, published a paper empirically testing Chizhevsky hypothesis analyzing events described in Soviet historical handbooks. Putilov found that the frequency and "polarity" of events, including revolution, is the highest in the years of the solar cycle maximum and the lowest in the year before the minimum. In 1996 professor of psychology Suitbert Ertel (University of Göttingen) corroborated a "substantial" relationship between solar activity and revolutionary behavior through statistical analysis of a "Master Index of Violence from Below" (MIVE) for the period 1700–1985 CE.

== Legacy ==
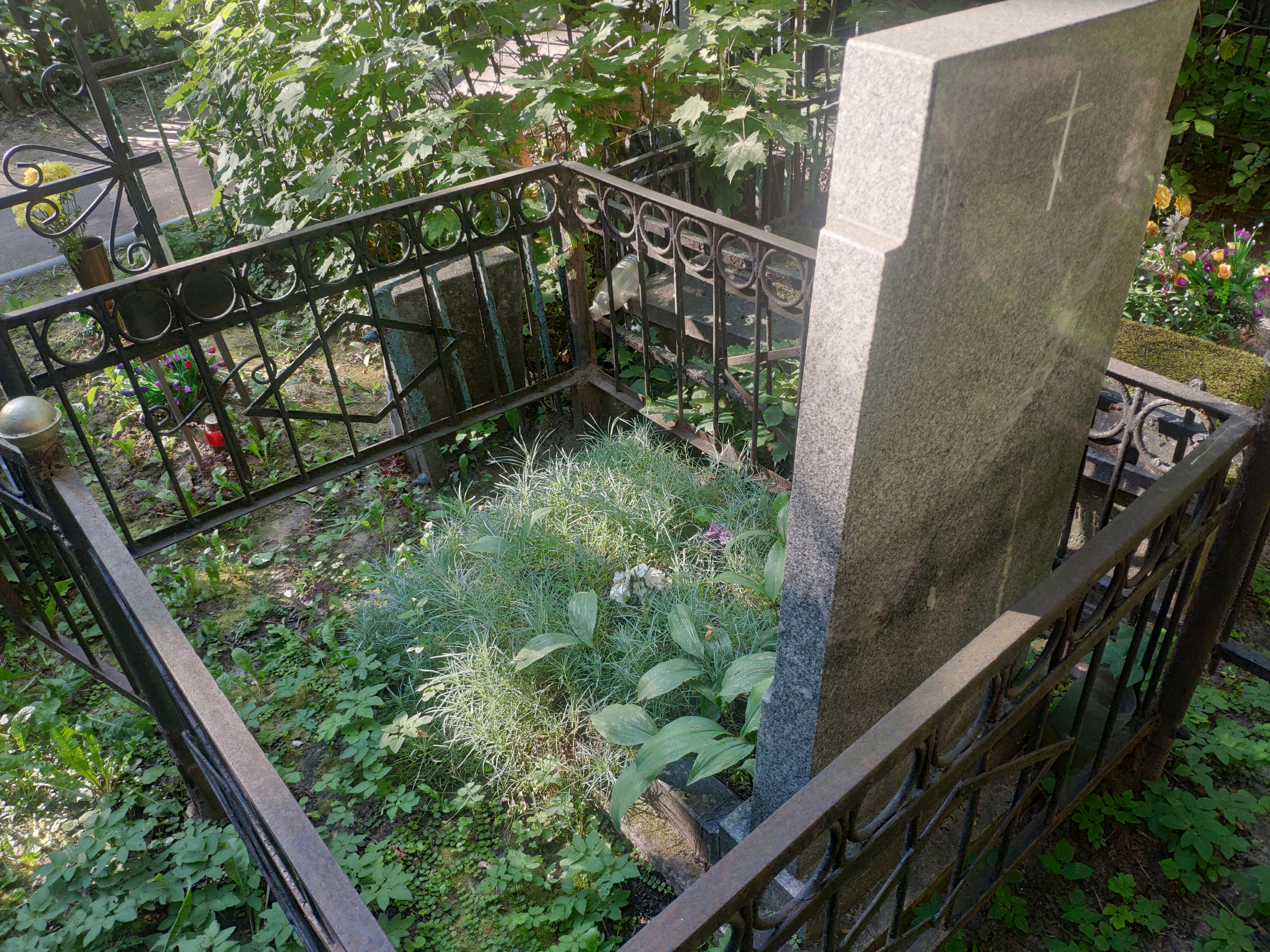
Chizhevsky's grave

A main-belt asteroid (or minor planet) discovered by Soviet astronomer Nikolai Stepanovich Chernykh in 1978 is named 3113 Chizhevskij after Chizhevsky.

The Chizhevsky Science Center opened in Kaluga, Russia, in 2000, in the home where Chizhevsky lived and worked for a number of years. It is part of the Tsiolkovsky Museum. There Chizhevsky researched sun-earth relations and conducted experimental research on the effects of ionized air on a living organism, laying down basics of air-ionization. The center features exhibits, photographs and films, lectures and tours.

== Bibliography ==
- Alexander Chizhevsky, "Physical Factors of the Historical Process," (paper) Kaluga, 1924. (Included in a downloaded file from Astrotheos.com.)
- Alexander Chizhevsky, The Terrestrial Echo of Solar Storms, 366 pp. 1976, Moscow, (First published in 1936 in Russian: А.Л.Чижевский. Земное эхо солнечных бурь.)
- Alexander Chizhevsky, Space Pulse of Life. (Originally titled The Earth In The Embrace Of The Sun), Moscow: Misl, 1995 (in Russian) with preface to by L. V. Golovanov.
- John T Burns, Cosmic Influences on Humans, Animals and Plants: An Annotated Bibliography, 1997, Magill Bibliographies, ISBN 0-8108-3313-1.
- Prof. L.A. Blyumenfel’d, editor, Solar Activity & The Biosphere: Heliobiology. From A.L. Chizhevsky To The Present by Boris M. Vladimirsky, N.A. Temuryants/Temurjants. Russian Academy of Natural Sciences. 1999. 30 pages, 93 figures, 24 tables, and Bibliography with 500 items. Distributed by: International Independent Ecological & Politological University, Ulitsa Krasnokazatskaya 44, Zdanie MEI Moscow Power Generation Institute Building, Moscow, Russia.

== See also ==
- Heliobiology
- Chronobiology
- Solar variation
- Geochemistry
- Biogeochemistry
- Radiogeology
- War cycles
- Revolutionary wave
- List of astronomical cycles
- Edward R. Dewey
- Nikolai Kondratiev
- Konstantin Tsiolkovsky
