= Pyotr Kireevsky =

Russian philosopher (1808–1856)

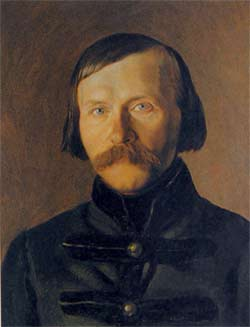
Pyotr Kireevsky; portrait by Emmanuil Dmitriev-Mamonov.

Pyotr Vasilievich Kireevsky (Russian: Пётр Васи́льевич Кире́евский, 23 February 1808 in Dolbino, Likhvinsky Uyezd, Kaluga Governorate – 6 November 1856) was a Russian folklorist and philologist many of whose materials remain unpublished to this day.

Kireevsky was an ardent Slavophile like his elder and more famous brother Ivan Vasilievich (although Schelling thought Pyotr the more original of the two). He spent his entire life collecting folk songs and lyrics. Some of these were contributed by Alexander Pushkin, Nikolai Gogol, Aleksey Koltsov, and Vladimir Dahl.

During his lifetime, Kireevsky printed only the first volume of his collection, containing "spiritual lyrics". Ten other volumes were brought out posthumously, between 1860 and 1874, under the supervision of Pyotr Bessonov. Another anthology was published in 1911; it was used by Igor Stravinsky to arrange his libretto for the ballet Les Noces (first performed in 1923).
