= Alexey Bogolyubov =

Russian artist (1824–1896)

- Алексей Боголюбов
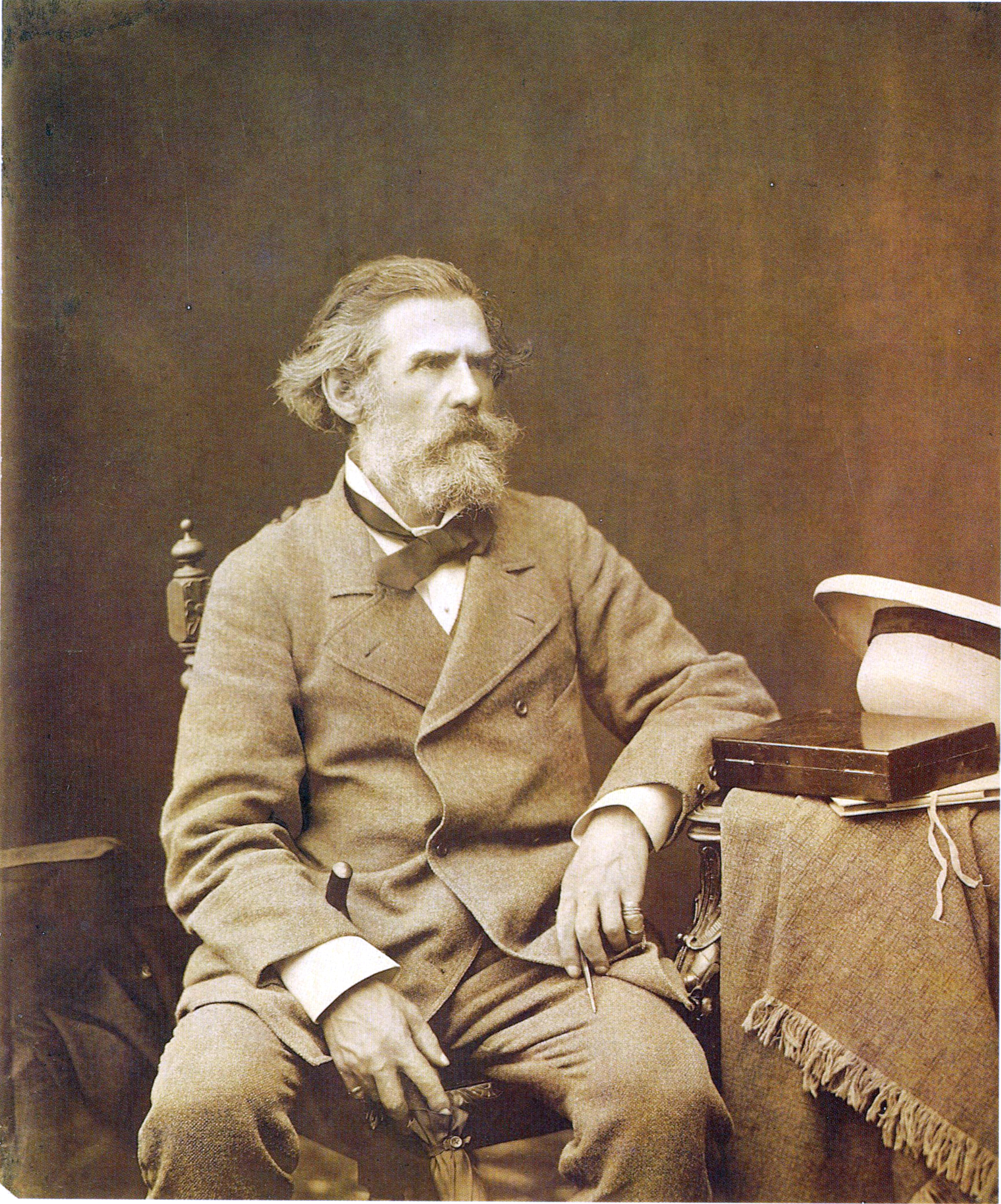
- Portrait photograph by Andrei Karelin
- Born: 16 March 1824; Novgorod Governorate, Russian Empire
- Died: 7 November 1896 (aged 72); Paris, France
- Resting place: Tikhvin Cemetery, Saint Petersburg
- Education: Member Academy of Arts (1858); Professor by rank (1861); Full Member Academy of Arts (1893)
- Alma mater: Imperial Academy of Arts (1853)
- Known for: Painting
- Style: landscape art marine art
- Movement: Peredvizhniki (Note: "The Peredvizhniki appreciated Bogolyubov's professionalism and the realistic principles of his work, but disagreed with him in defining priorities in art. Nevertheless, the "neutral" character of landscape allowed such truthful observers of nature as Bogolyubov to coexist in the association.")
- Relatives: Alexander Radishchev (grandfather)
- Awards: Big Gold Medal of the Imperial Academy of Arts (1853)

Alexey Petrovich Bogolyubov (Russian: Алексей Петрович Боголюбов; 16 March 1824 – 3 February 1896) was a Russian landscape and seascape painter.

== Biography ==
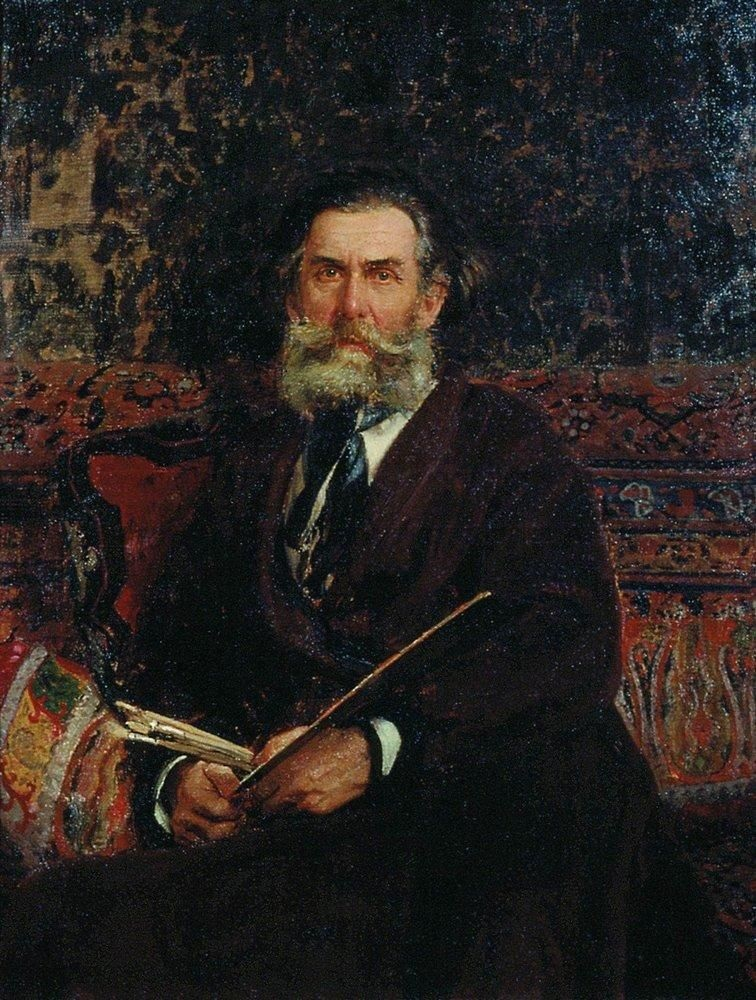
Portrait of Bogolyubov (1876) by Ilya Repin

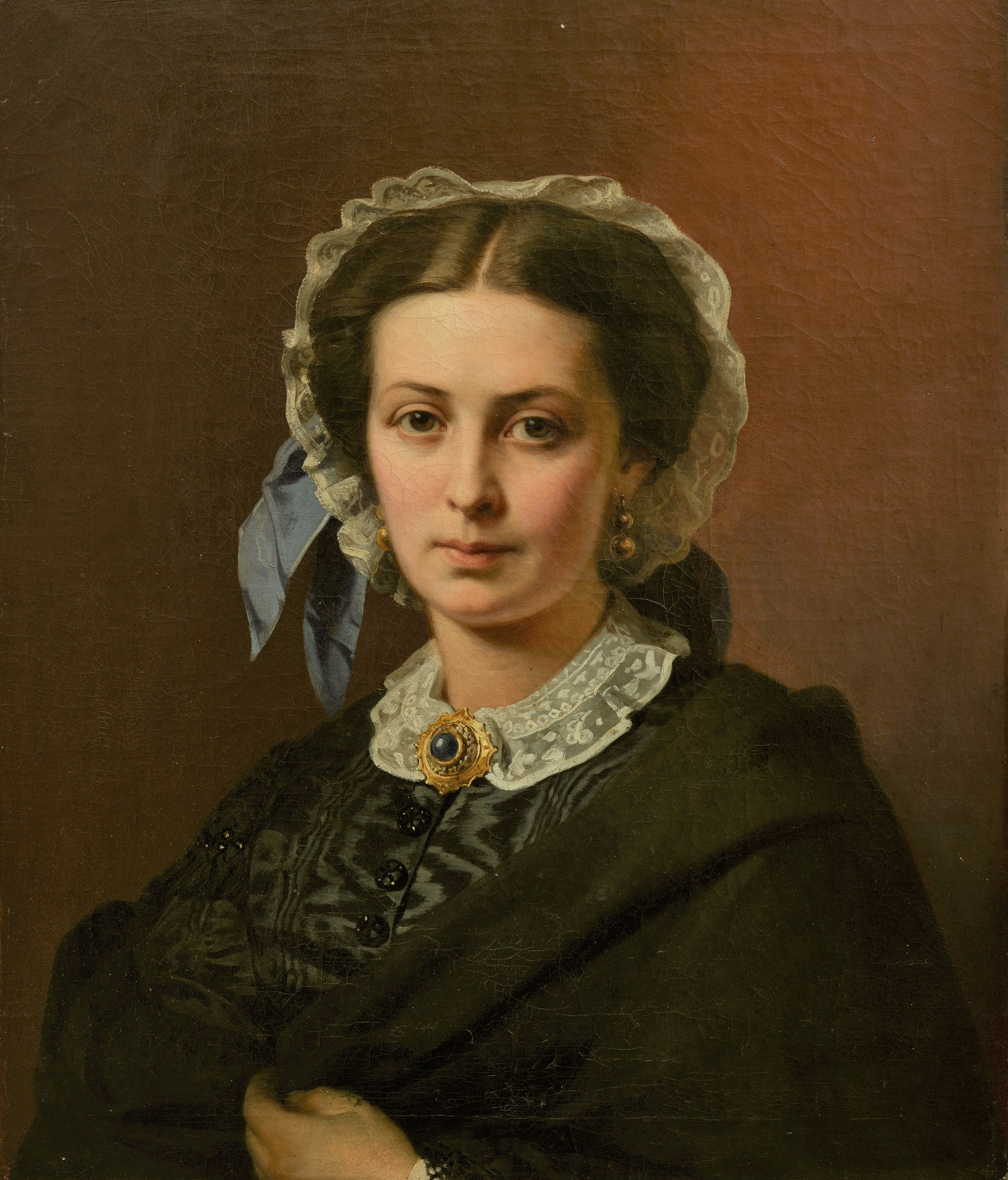
Nadezhda P. Bogolyubova, Bogolyubov's wife by Vasily Petrovich Vereshchagin

Bogolyubov was born in the Pomeranie village of Novgorod Governorate. His father was retired colonel Pyotr Gavriilovich Bogolyubov. Bogolyubov's maternal grandfather was the philosopher and social critic Alexander Radishchev.

In 1841, Bogolyubov graduated from military school, serving in the Imperial Russian Navy and travelling with the fleet to many countries. In 1849, he started to attend classes of the Saint Petersburg Academy of Arts, where he studied under Maxim Vorobiev. The young painter was greatly influenced by Ivan Ayvazovsky (Aivazovsky). In 1853, he finished the Academy with a major Gold medal. He retired as a navy officer and was appointed an artist to the Navy headquarters.

From 1854 to 1860, he travelled around Europe and worked prolifically. In Rome, he was acquainted with Alexander Ivanov, who convinced Bogolyubov to focus more on drawing. In Düsseldorf, Bogolyubov took classes from the painter Andreas Achenbach. In Paris, he admired the artists of the Barbizon School. French painters Camille Corot and Charles-François Daubigny were good friends and collaborators with Bogolyubov. He also painted the frescoes in the Alexander Nevsky Cathedral.

Bogolyubov returned to Russia in 1860. He exhibited his works in the Academy and received the title of professor. For some time, he taught in the Academy. In the 1860s, he traveled along the Volga. His paintings lost all traces of Romanticism, replacing that element with staunch realism of the natural. In 1871 he was elected to the Imperial Academy of Arts.

From 1870, he became close to the Wanderers art movement, participated in all their exhibitions. He became a member of their board. Much older than most of the other members of the movement, he had reservations on their social ideas. In 1873, Bogolyubov left the Academy in solidarity with his fellow Itinerants. He even tried to create an alternative Russian Academy of Arts in Rome.

After 1873, Bogolyubov lived primarily in Paris, because of his heart condition. His house was like a Russian colony: frequent visitors included Ivan Turgenev, Ilya Repin, Vasily Polenov, Mark Antokolski, Vasily Vereshchagin.

In 1885, Bogolyubov opened an art museum in Saratov, the Radischev Art Museum, named after his grandfather. It was opened to the general public seven years earlier than the Tretyakov Gallery in Moscow and fifteen years earlier than the Russian Museum in Saint Petersburg. The naming of the museum after the "first Russian revolutionary", Alexander Radishchev, was a direct challenge to the authorities: Bogolyubov had to endure a legal battle to get permission.

Bogolyubov died on 3 February 1896 in Paris. He left all his money and capital (around 200 thousand Russian rubles (approximately US$6 million)) to the museum and its painting school. The school was opened after Bogolyubov's death and named Bogolyubov's Painting School (Боголюбовское Рисовальное Училище). Among painters who attended Bogolyubov's School were modernist painters as Victor Borisov-Musatov, Alexei Karev and Pavel Kuznetsov.

== Collections of works ==
Marine art & seascapes

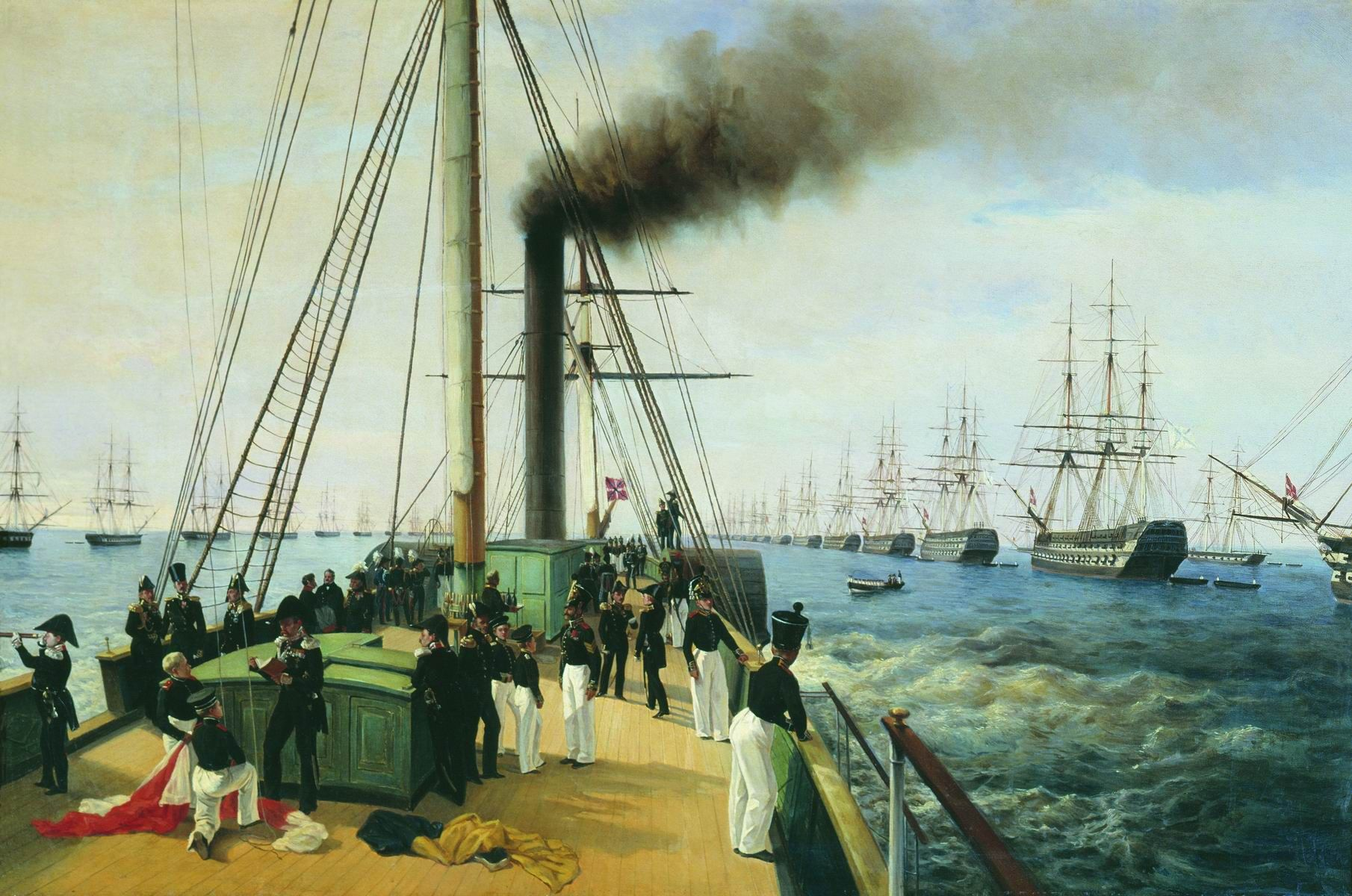
A review of the Baltic Fleet by Nicholas I at sea, from the deck of the ship, painting between 1850 and 1860.
Central Naval Museum

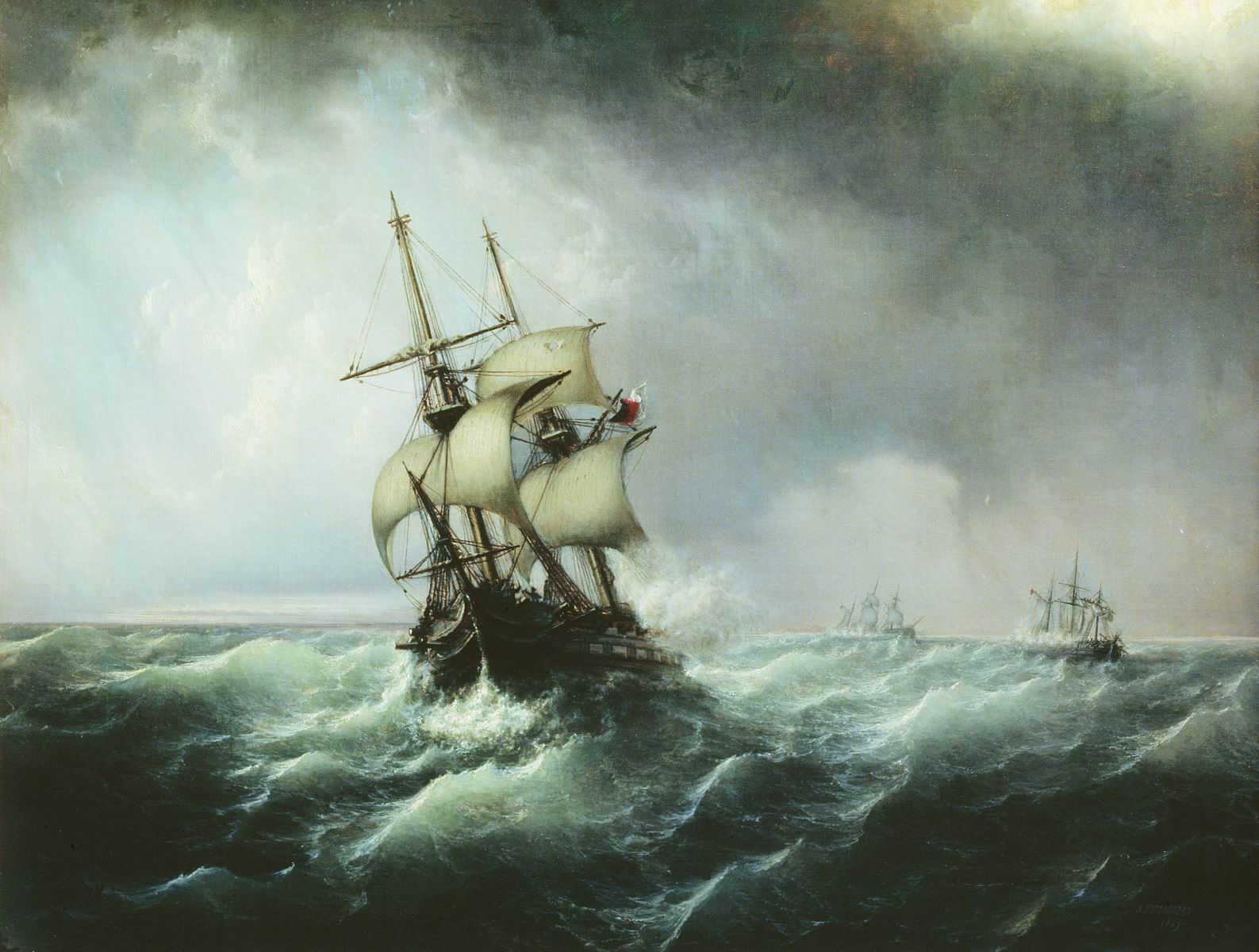
Naval battle (1859 painting)

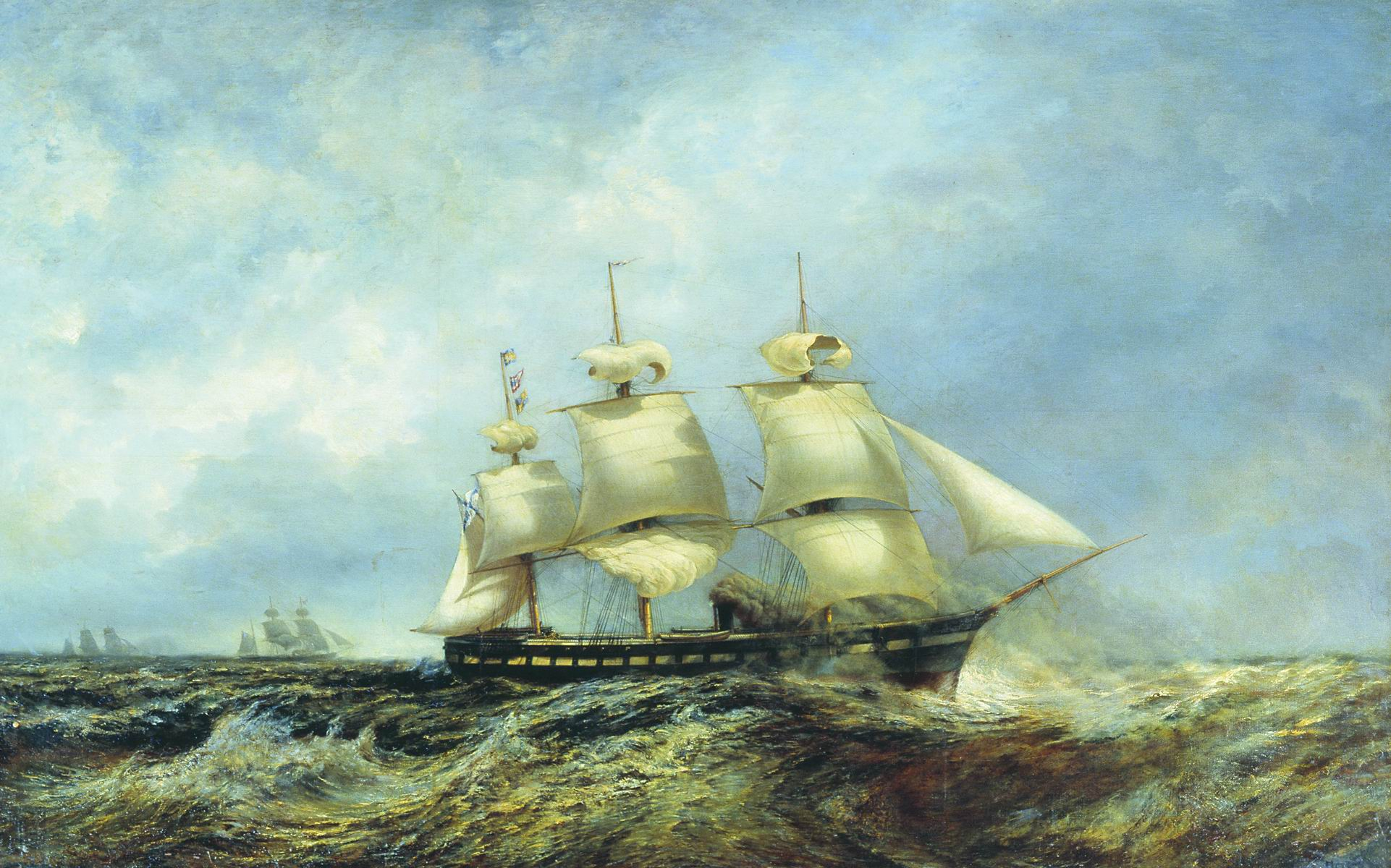
Russian squadron on its way to America in 1863
Central Naval Museum

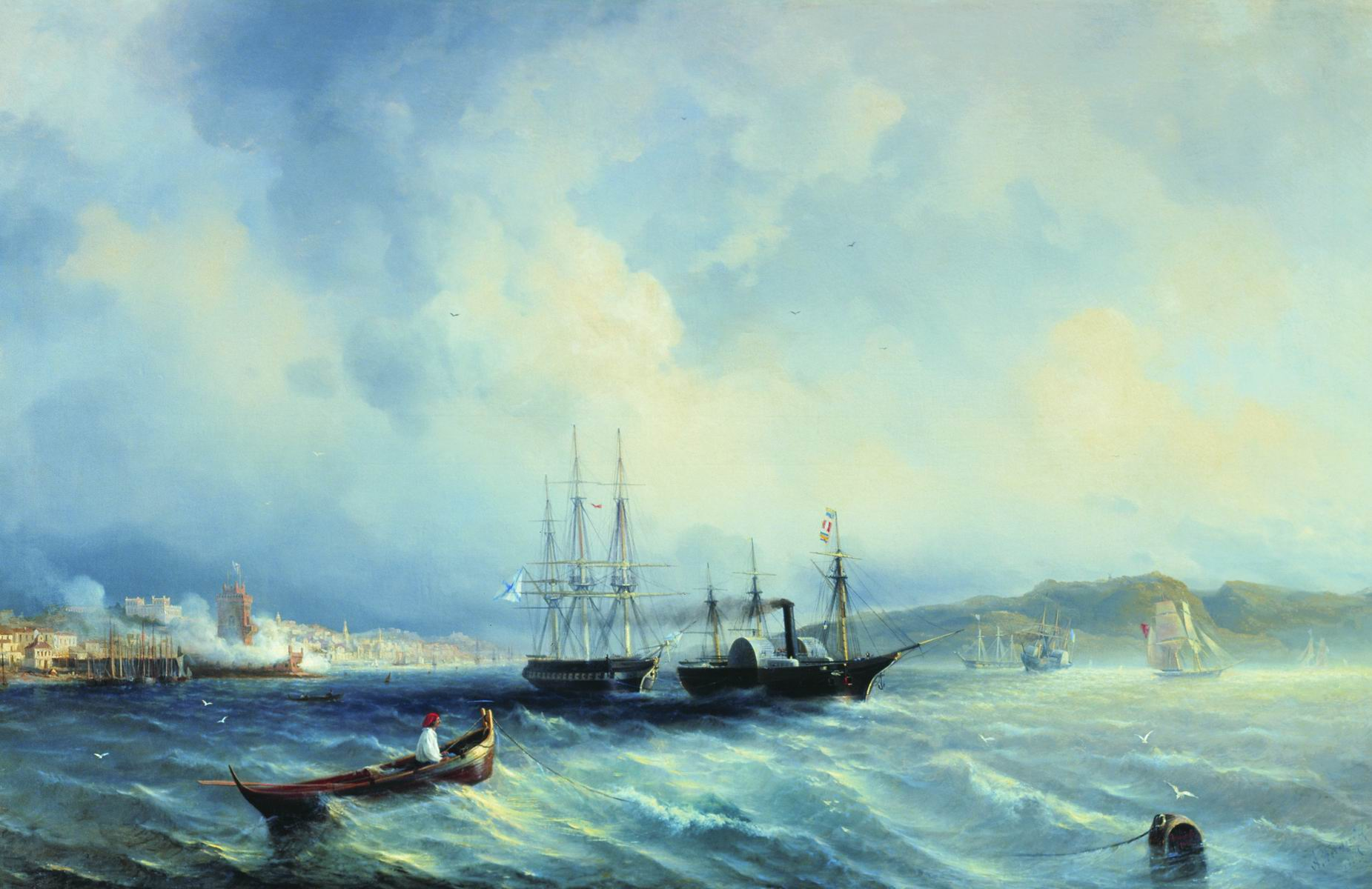
Exit from the Tagus River by the frigate Ilya Muromets in tug of the steam frigate Kamchatka. 1860s
Central Naval Museum

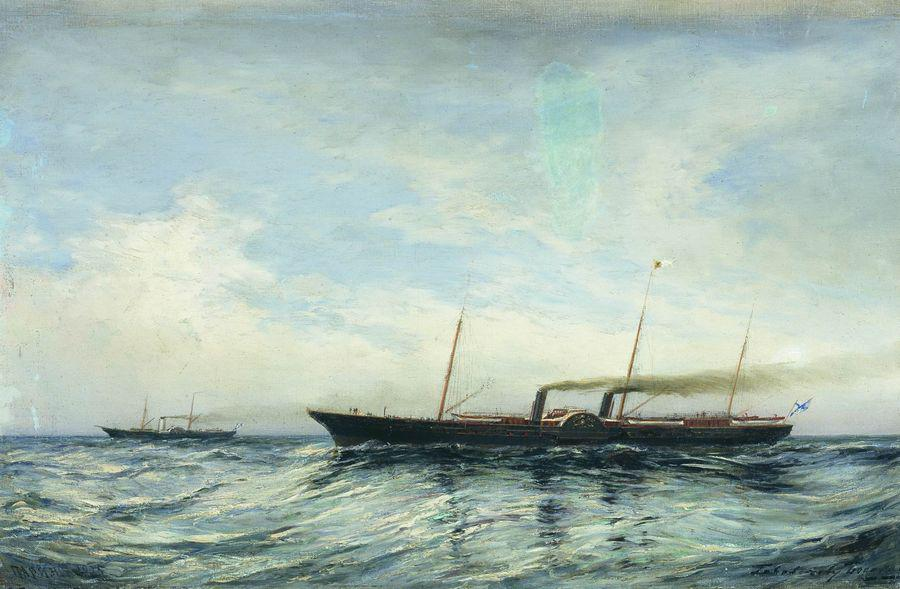
Yachts Derzhava and Zabava when opening a sea channel (1885)
Central Naval Museum

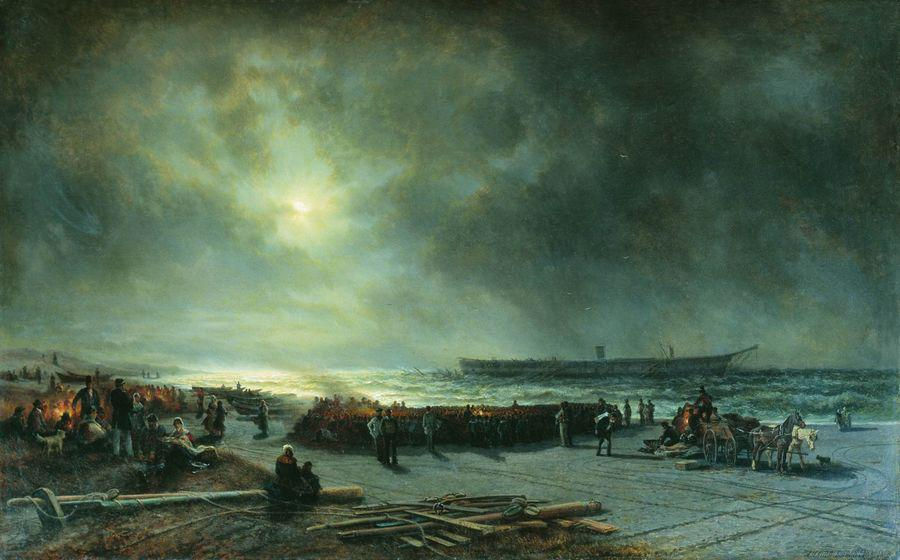
The Wreck of the Russian frigate Alexander Nevsky
Central Naval Museum

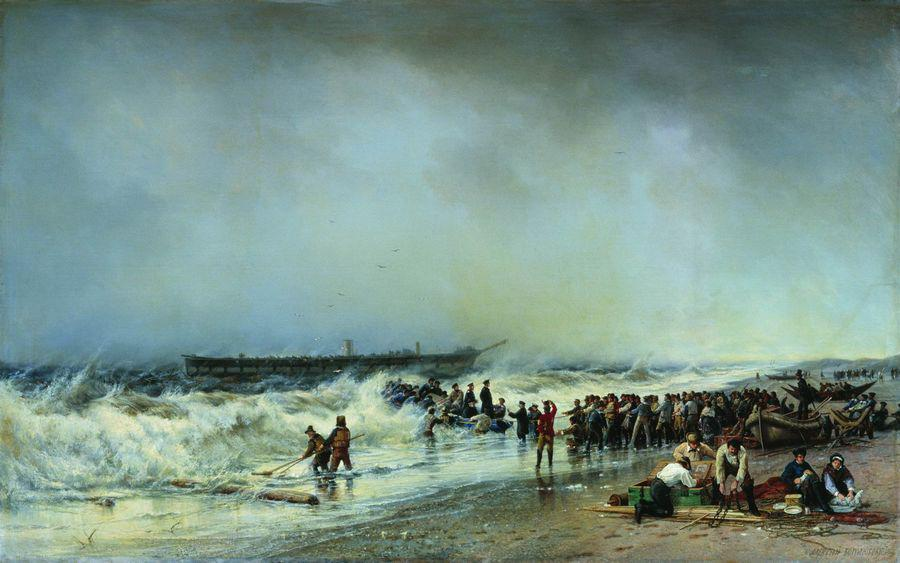
The Wreck of the Alexander Nevsky

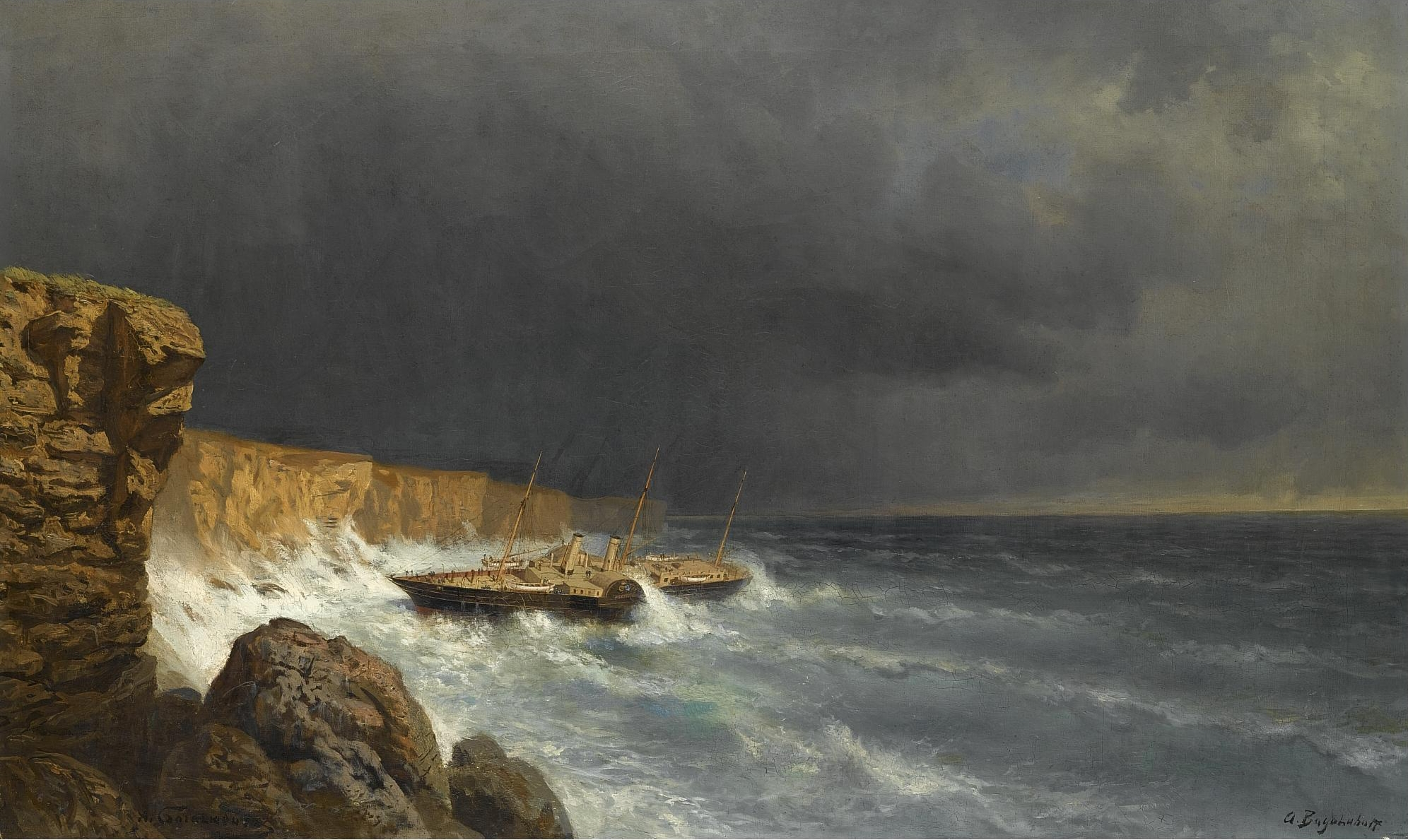
The Wreck of the Livadia, painting after 1878

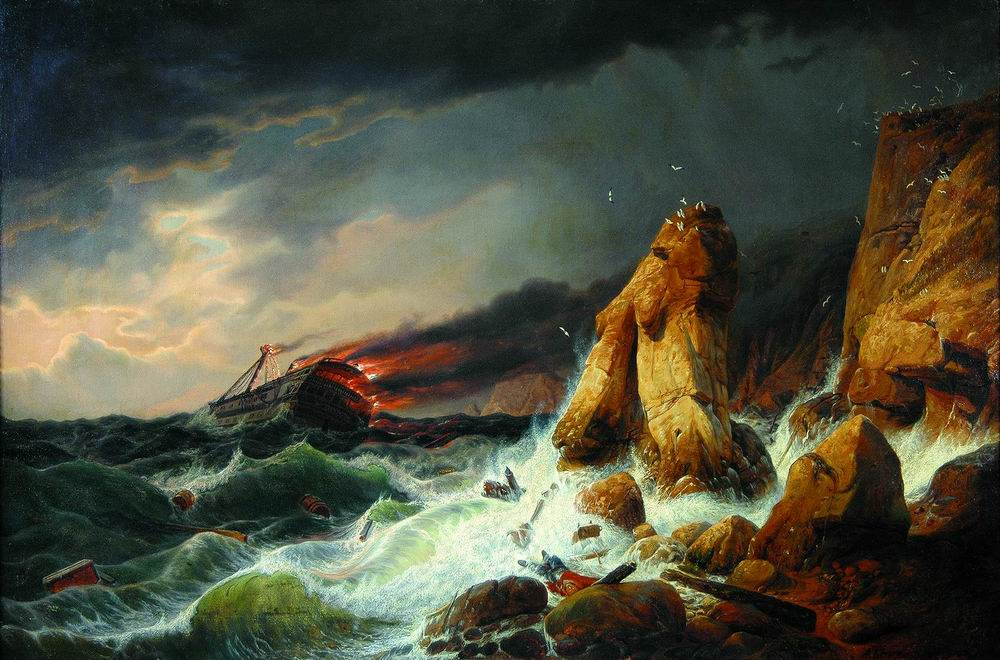
Shipwreck

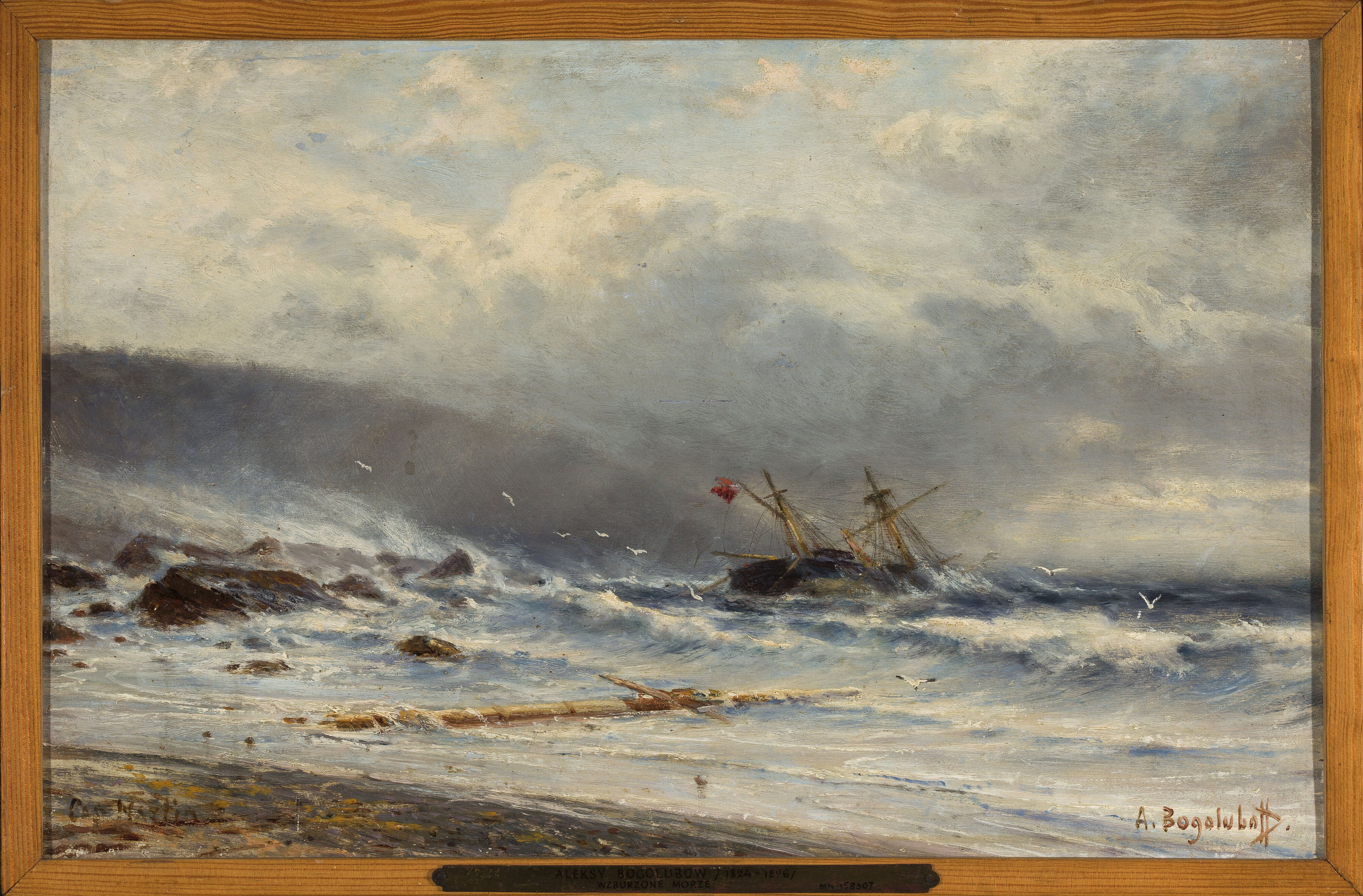
Rough sea
National Museum in Warsaw

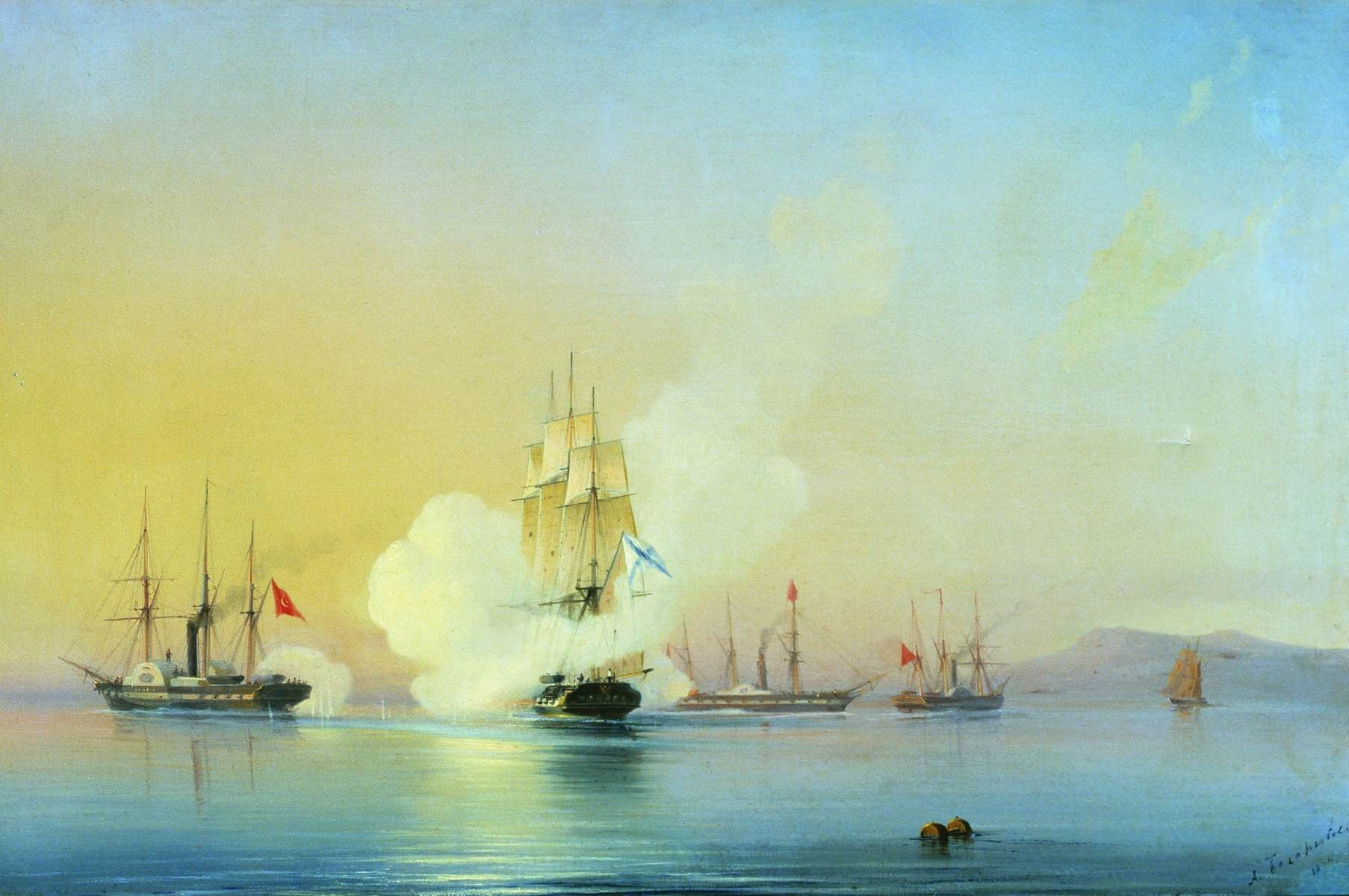
The battle of frigate Flora against Turkish steamships near Pitsunda on 11 November 1853 (1854 painting)

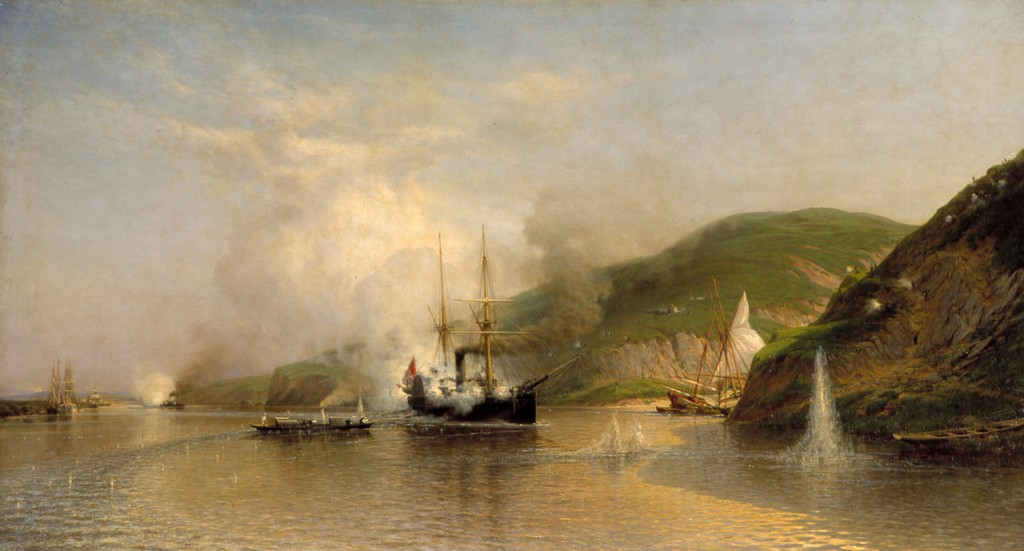
Attack by the boat Shutka or 'Joke' of a Turkish steamship on the Danube on 14 May 1877

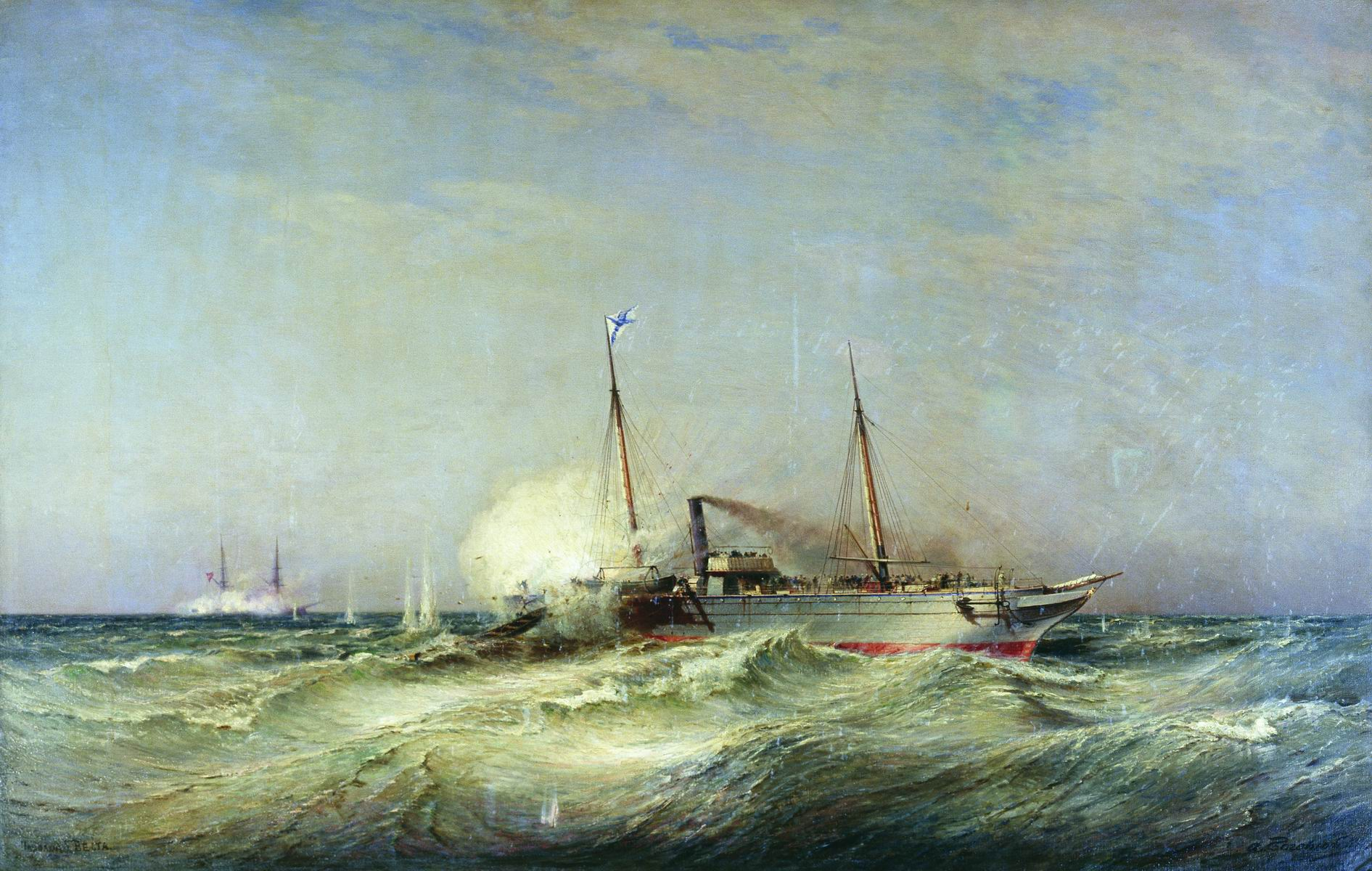
Fight of the steamer Vesta with the Turkish battleship Fethi-Butland in the Black Sea, 11 July 1877 (1878 painting)
Central Naval Museum

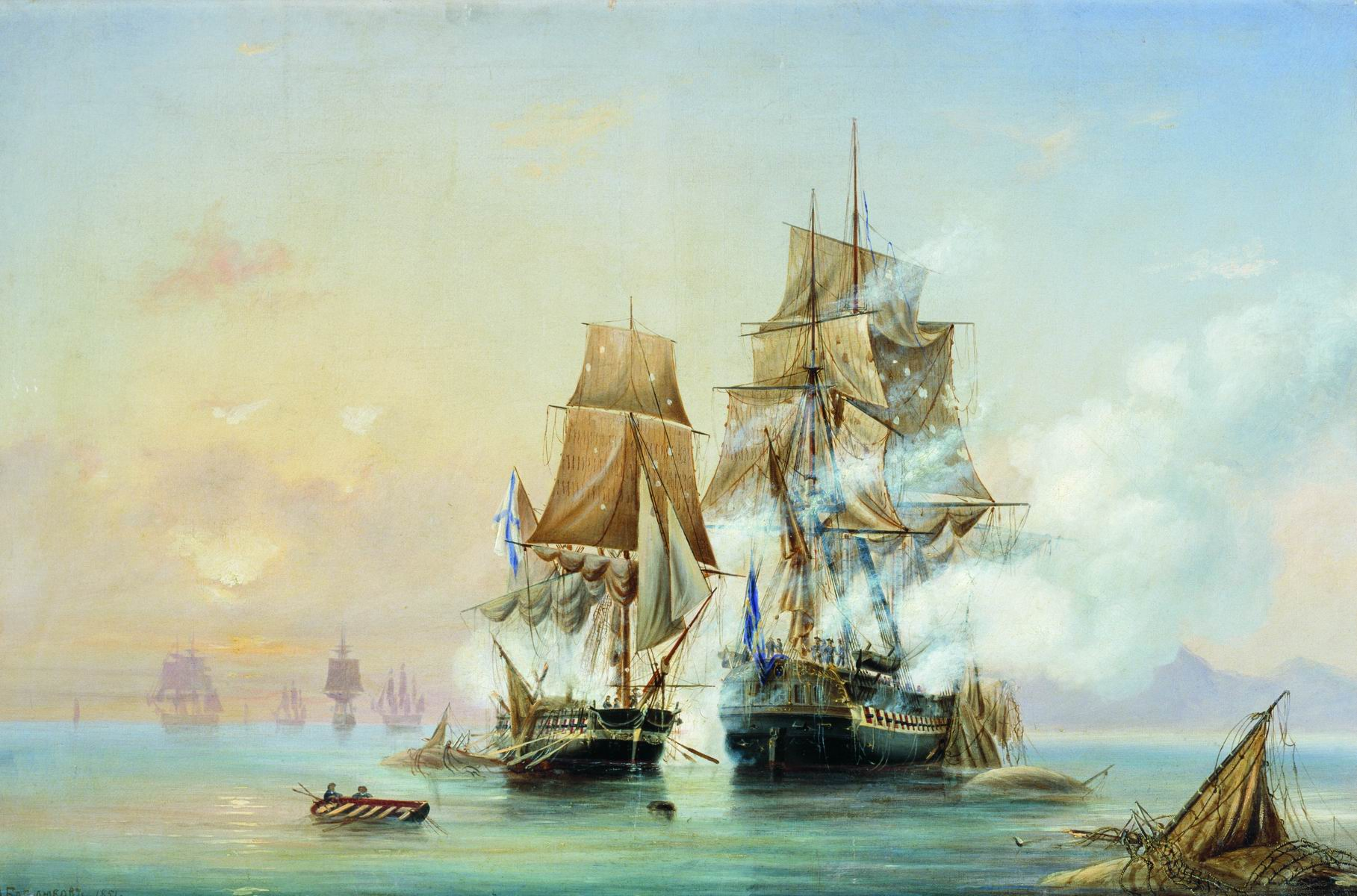
Capturing of Swedish 44-gun frigate Venus by Russian 22-gun cutter Merkuriy of June 1 [O.S. May 21] 1789.

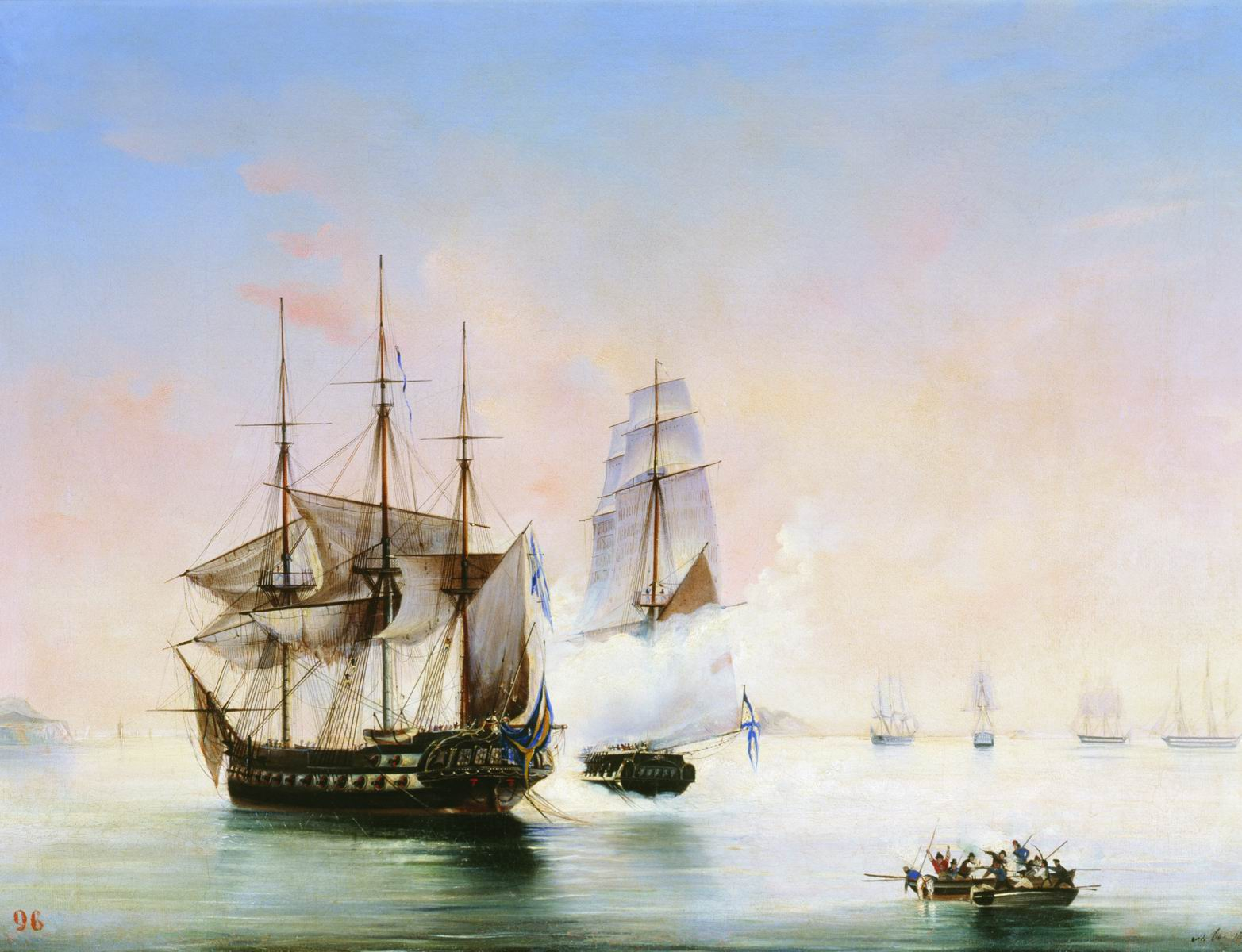
The Armed Cutter Merkuriy Capturing the Swedish Frigate Venus
Central Naval Museum

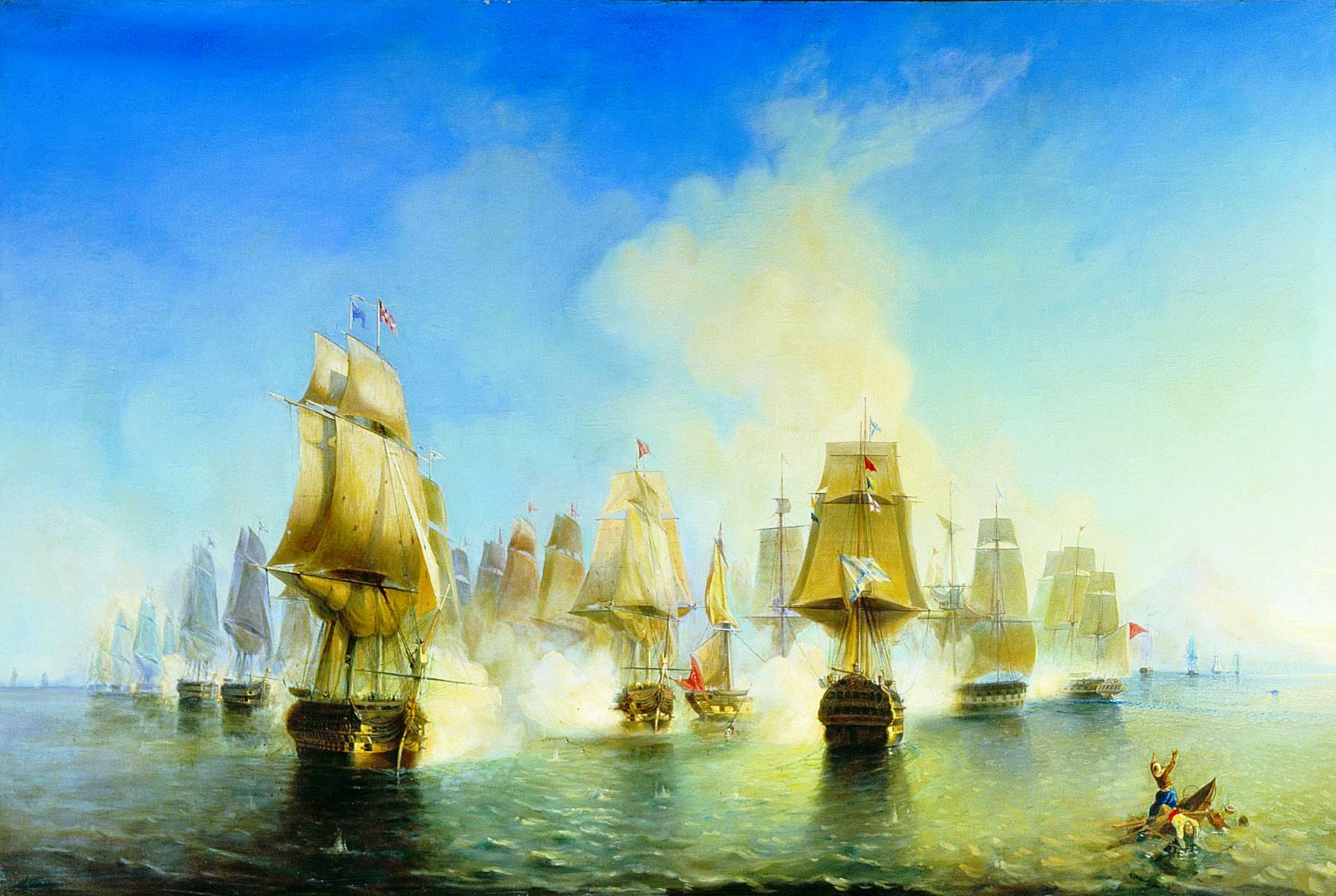
Battle of Athos in 1807

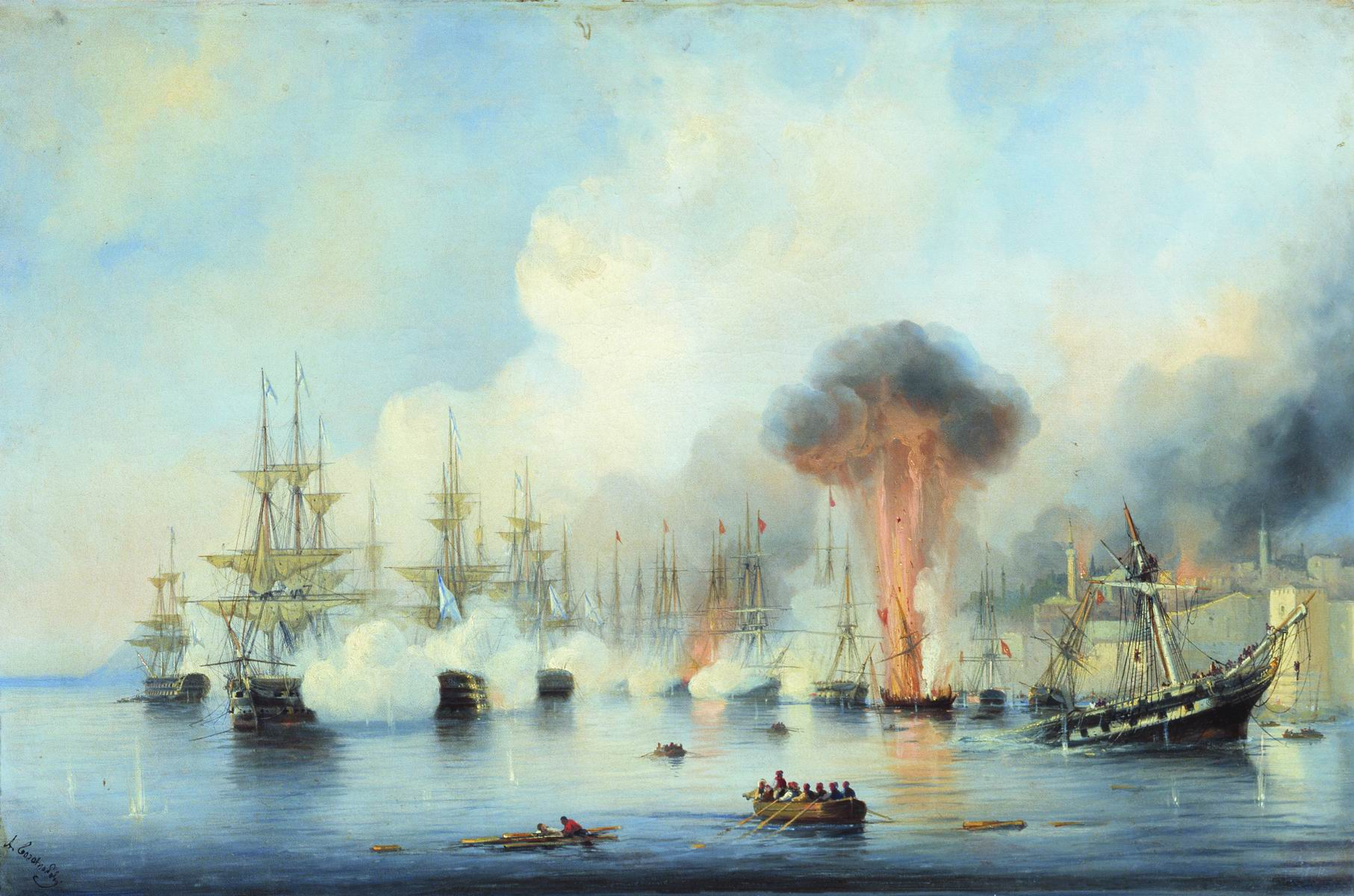
Battle of Sinop in 1853 (1860 painting)
Central Naval Museum

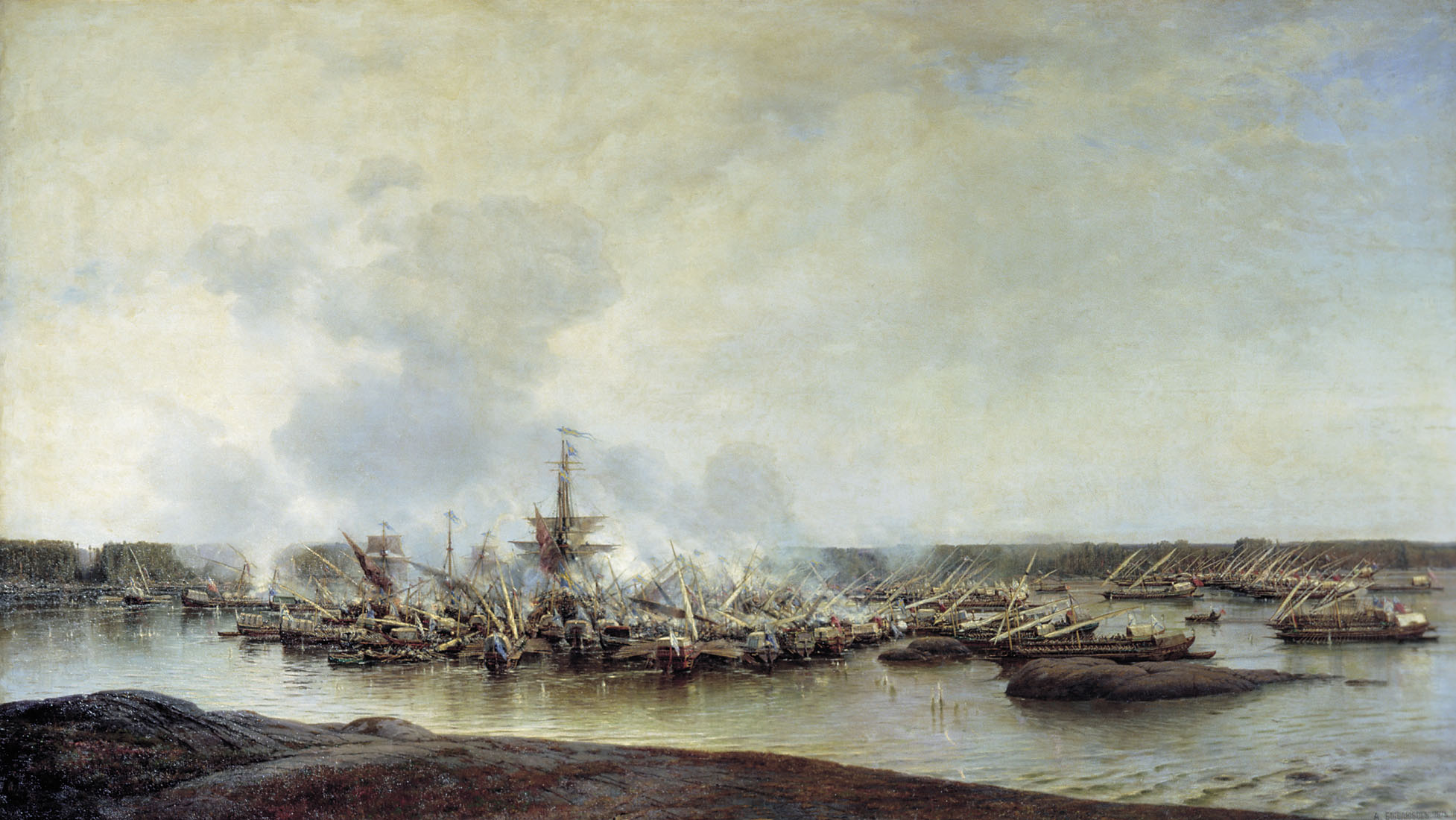
Battle of Gangut in 1714

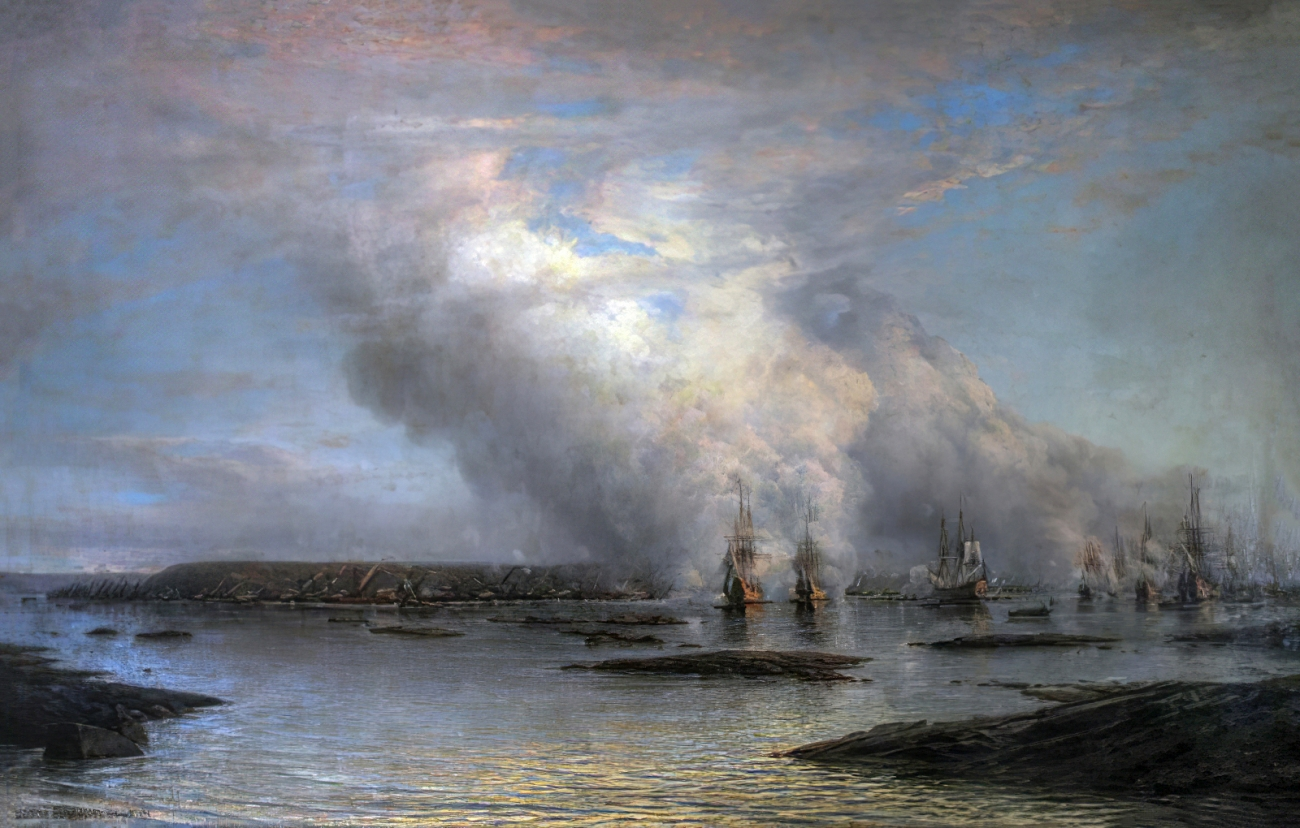
Battle of Gangut

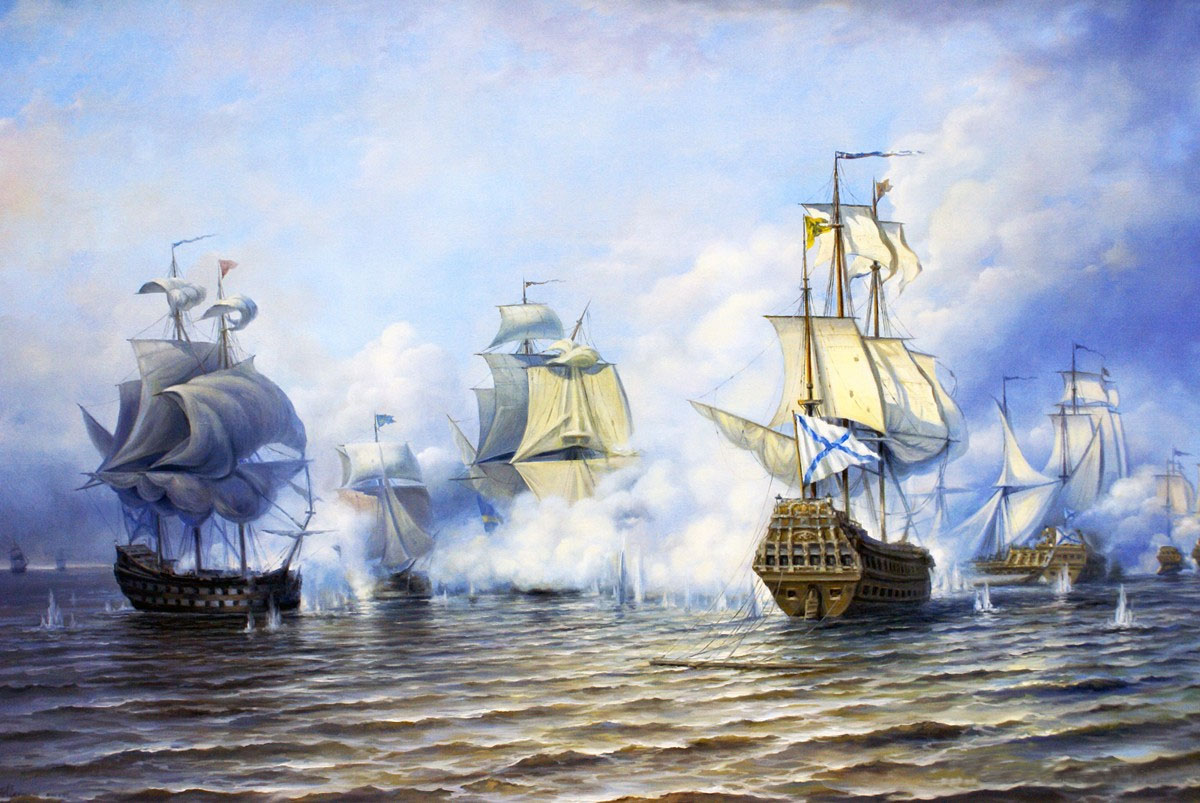
Battle of Ösel in 1719

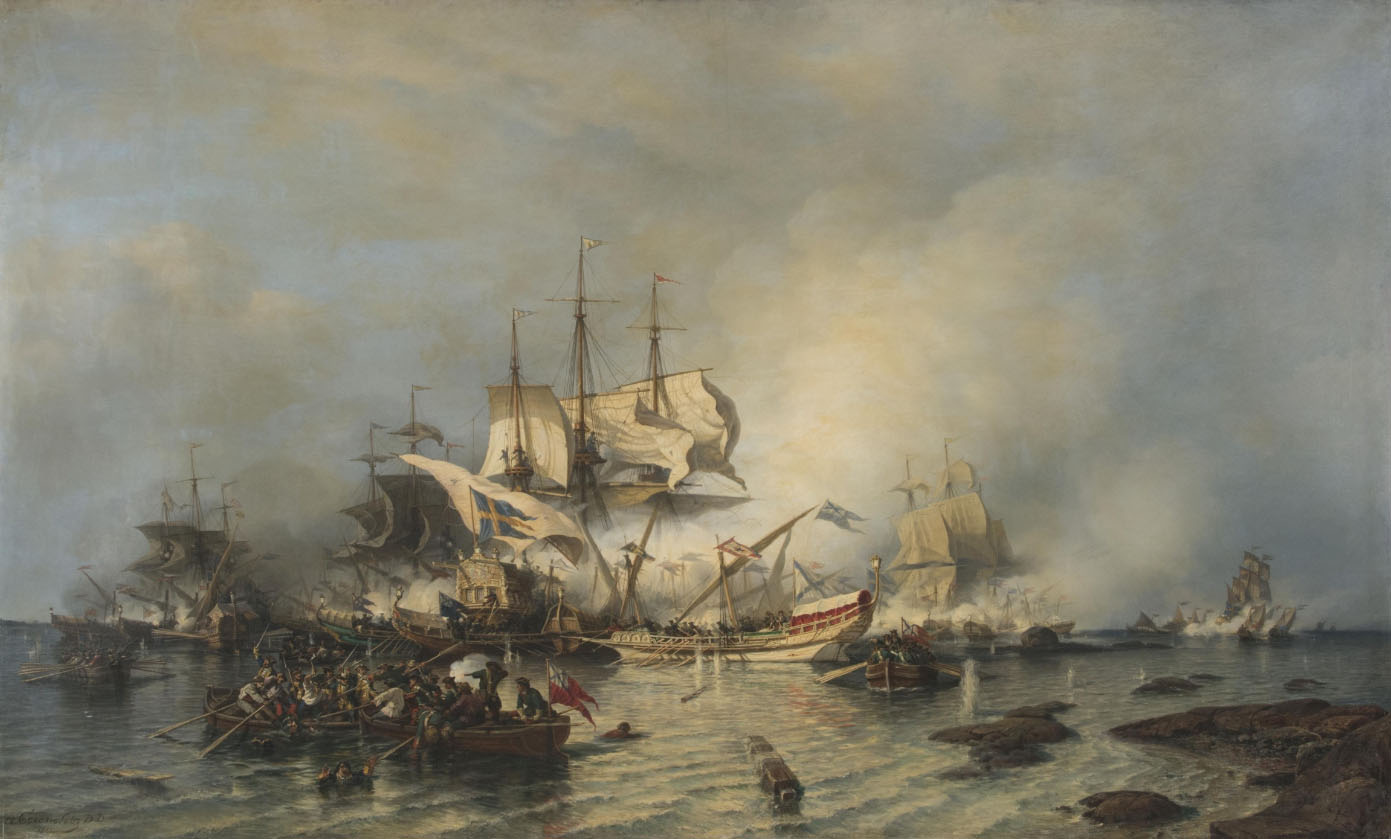
Battle of Grengam in 1720
The Russian Museum

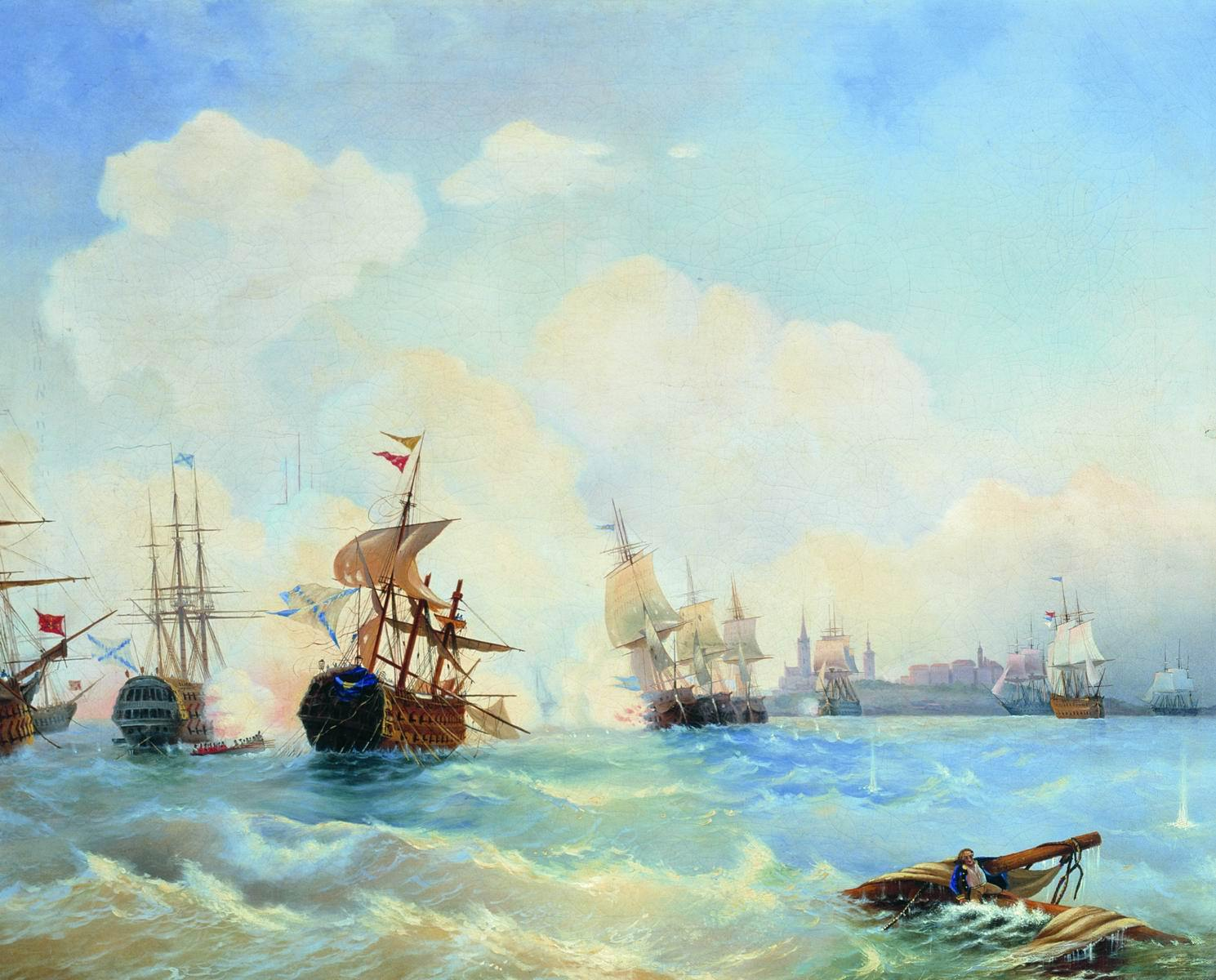
Battle of Reval in 1790 (a free copy of Aivazovsky's painting)

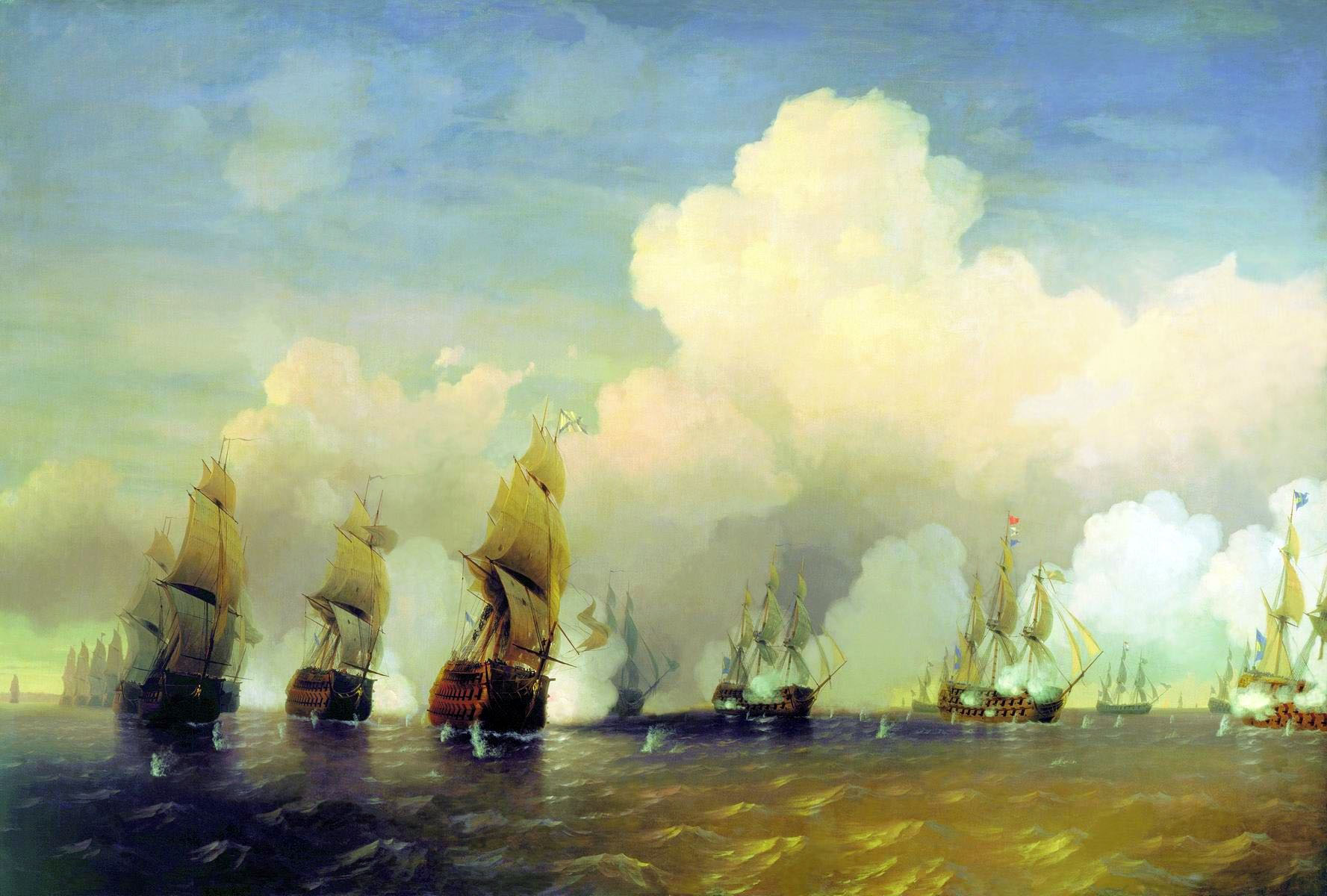
Battle of Kronstadt in 1790

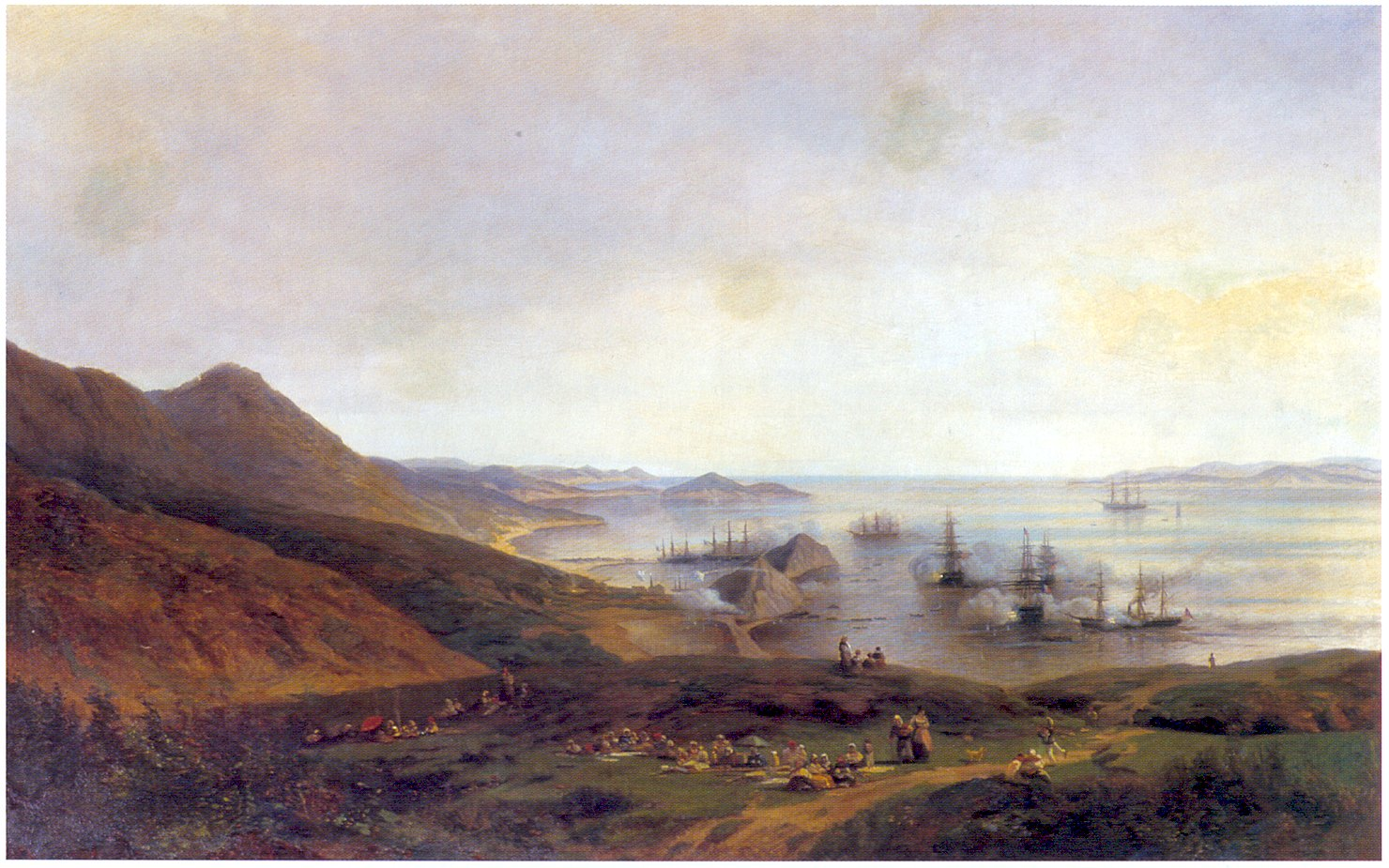
Siege of Petropavlovsk in 1854

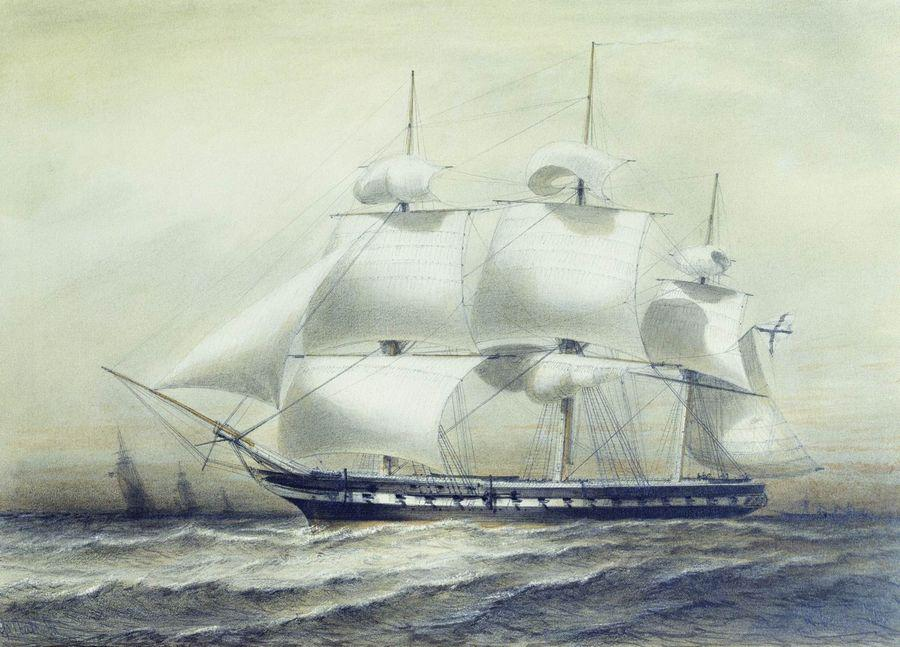
Russian frigate Pallada, 1847
Central Naval Museum

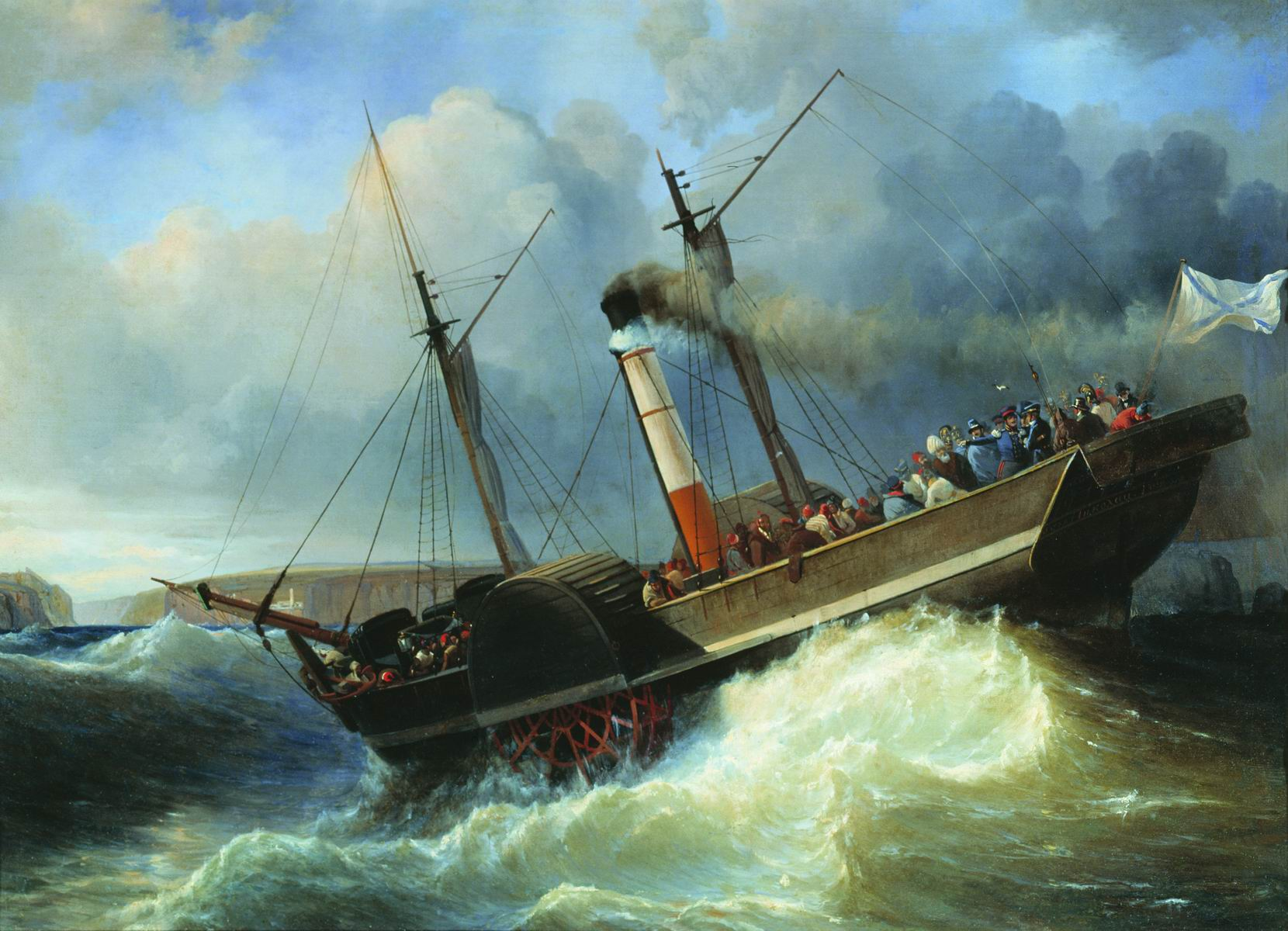
Passenger steamship Imperator Nikolay ('Emperor Nicholas') off the Black Sea coast. 1840–1850s
Central Naval Museum

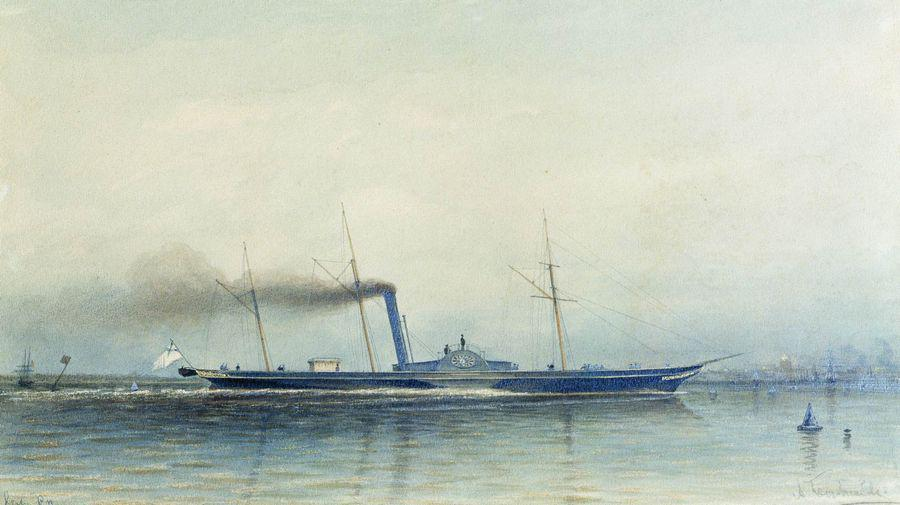
Imperial steam yacht Aleksandria of 1852
Central Naval Museum

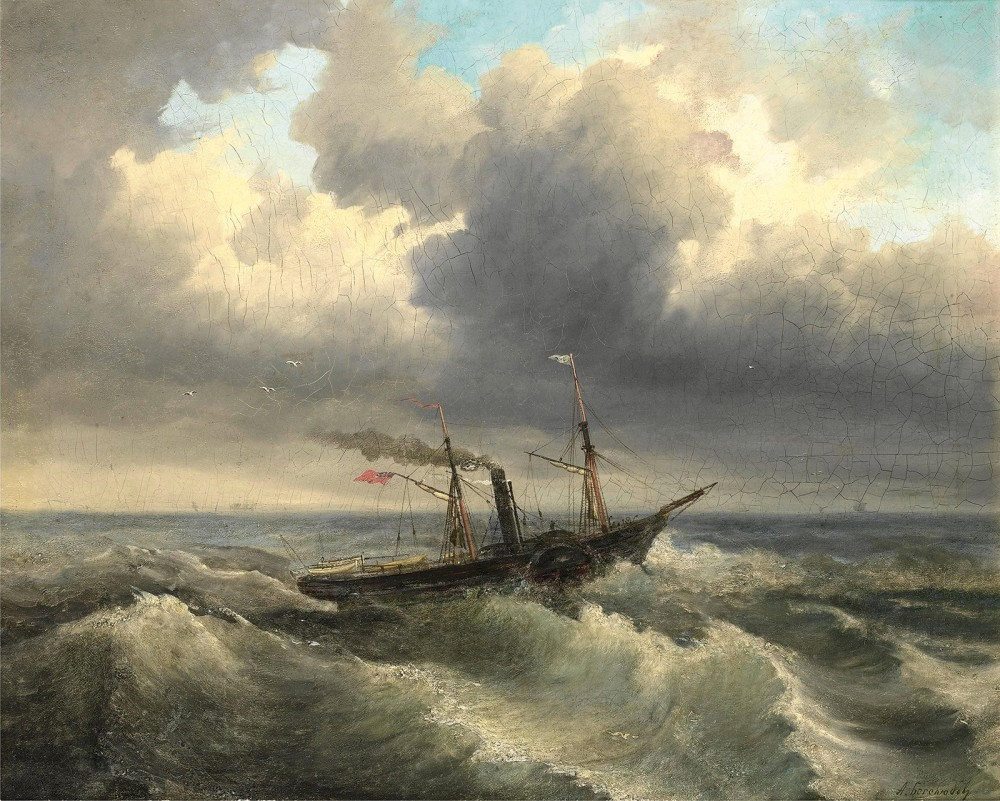
Shipping in Rough Waters

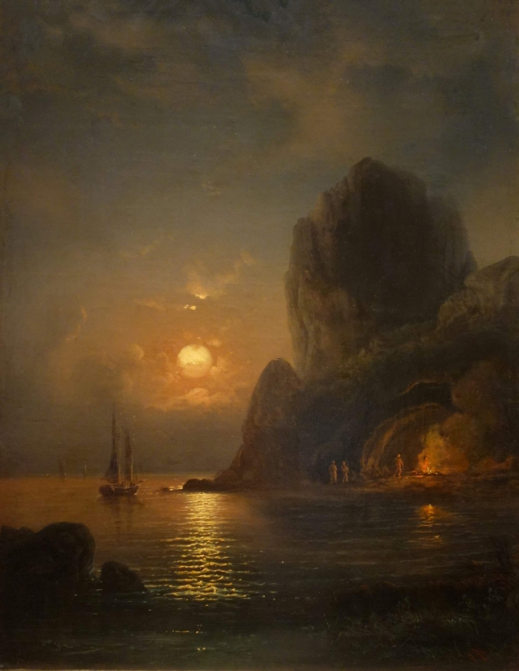
Moonlit Night at Sea, 1874
The Russian Museum

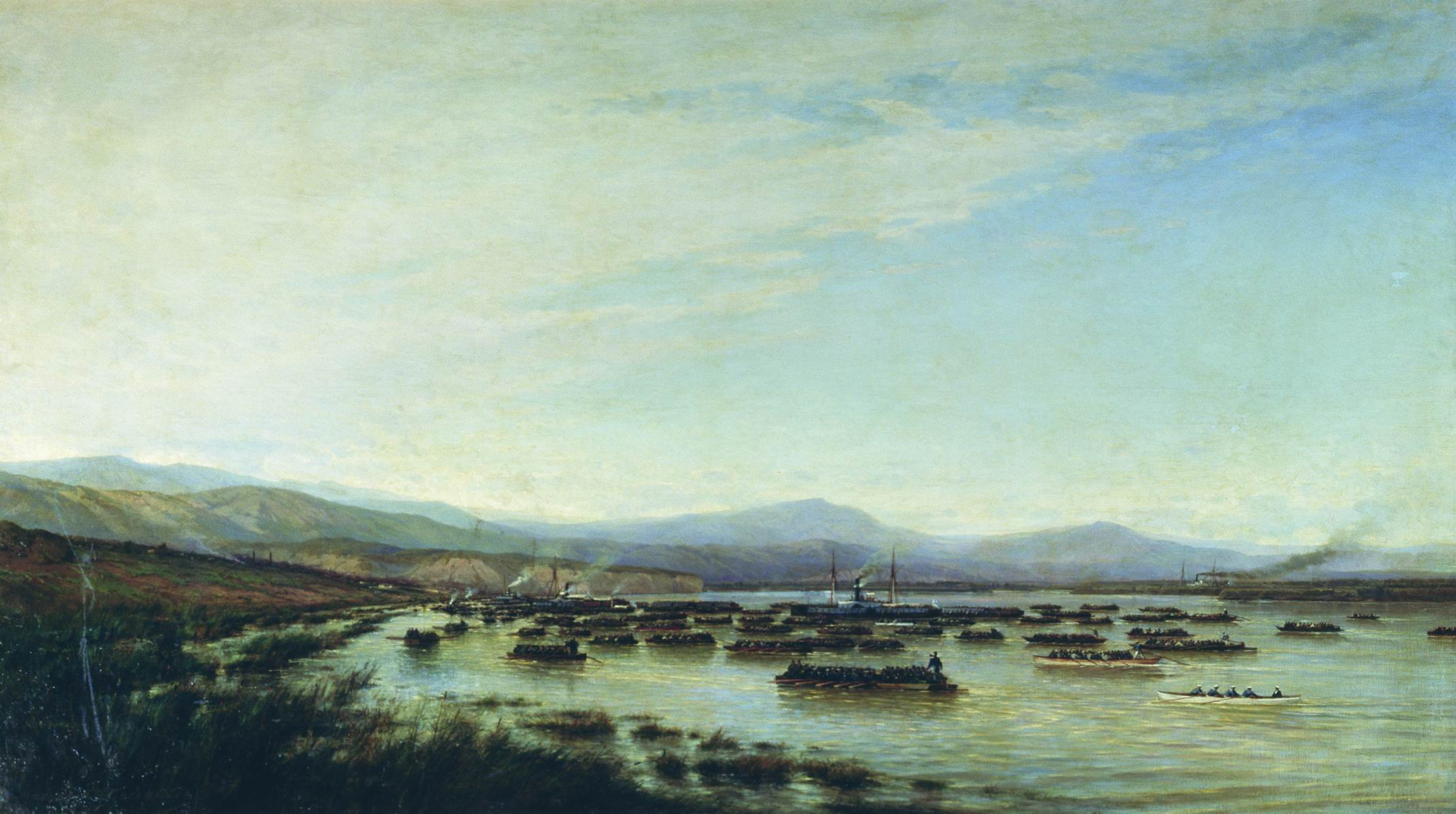
Imperial Russian troops crossing the Danube at Maçin. 1877 (1878 painting)
Central Naval Museum

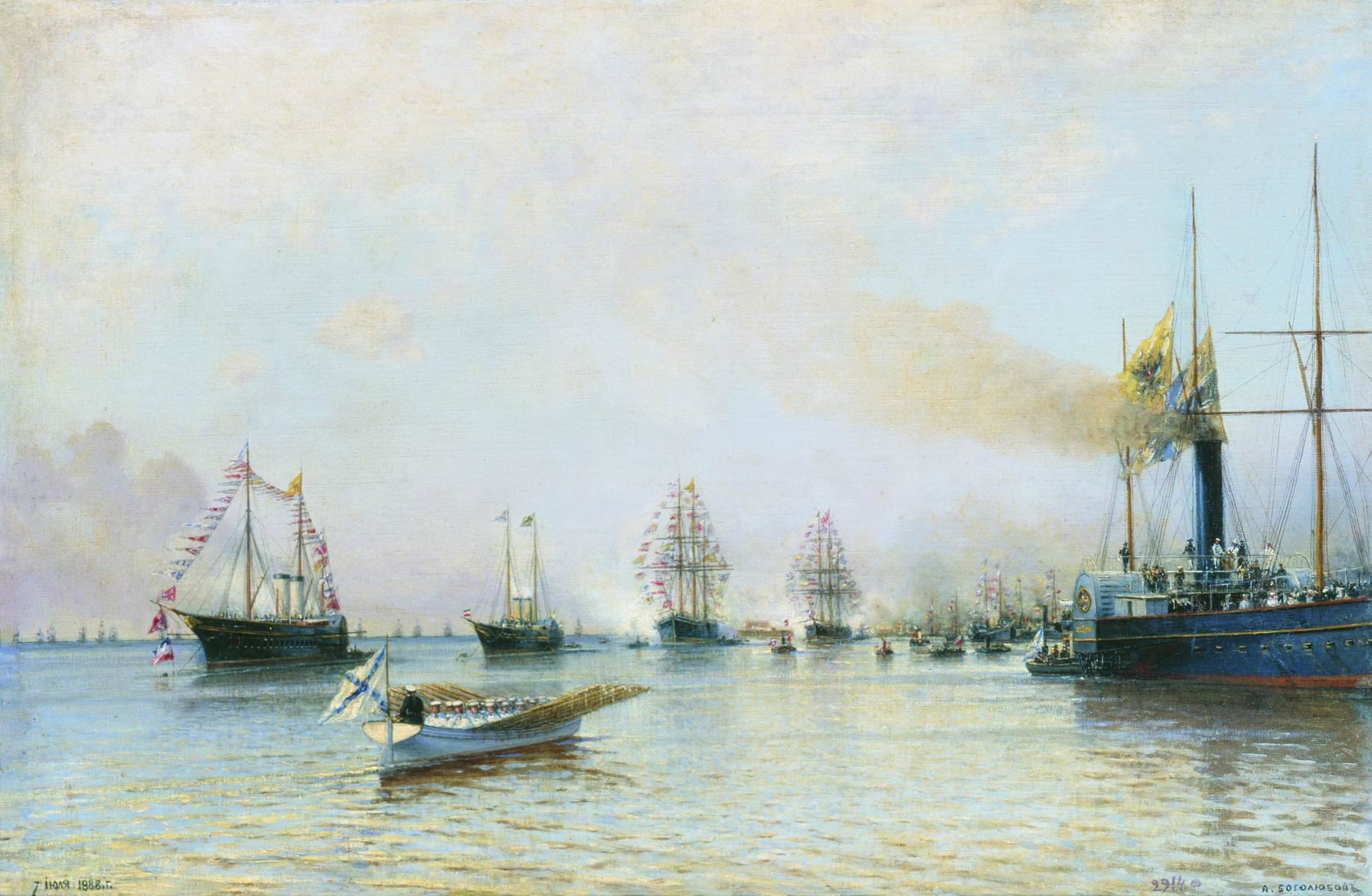
Parade of ships of the Baltic Fleet on the occasion of the German squadron's arrival of 1888
Central Naval Museum

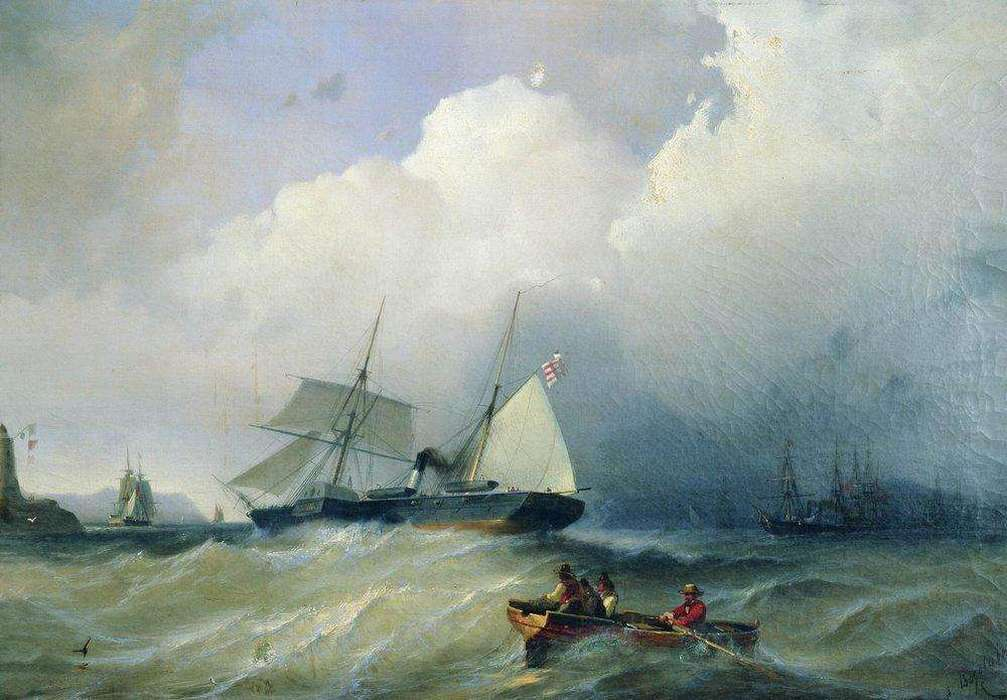
Baltic Sea (1880s)

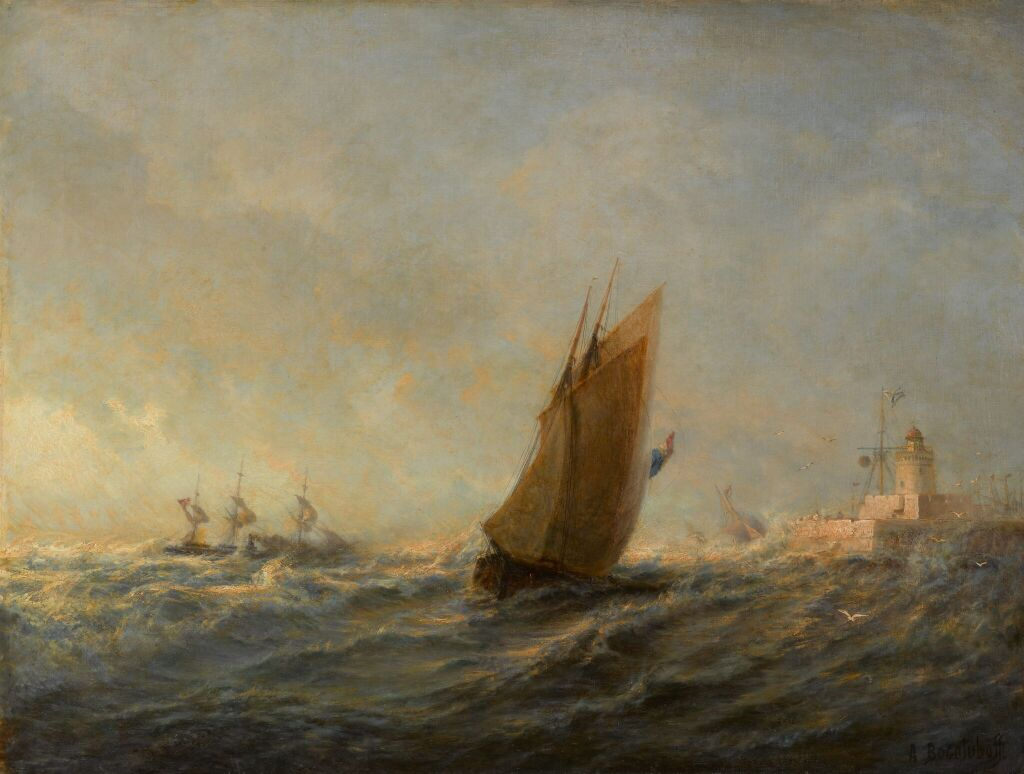
Storm
Tretyakov Gallery

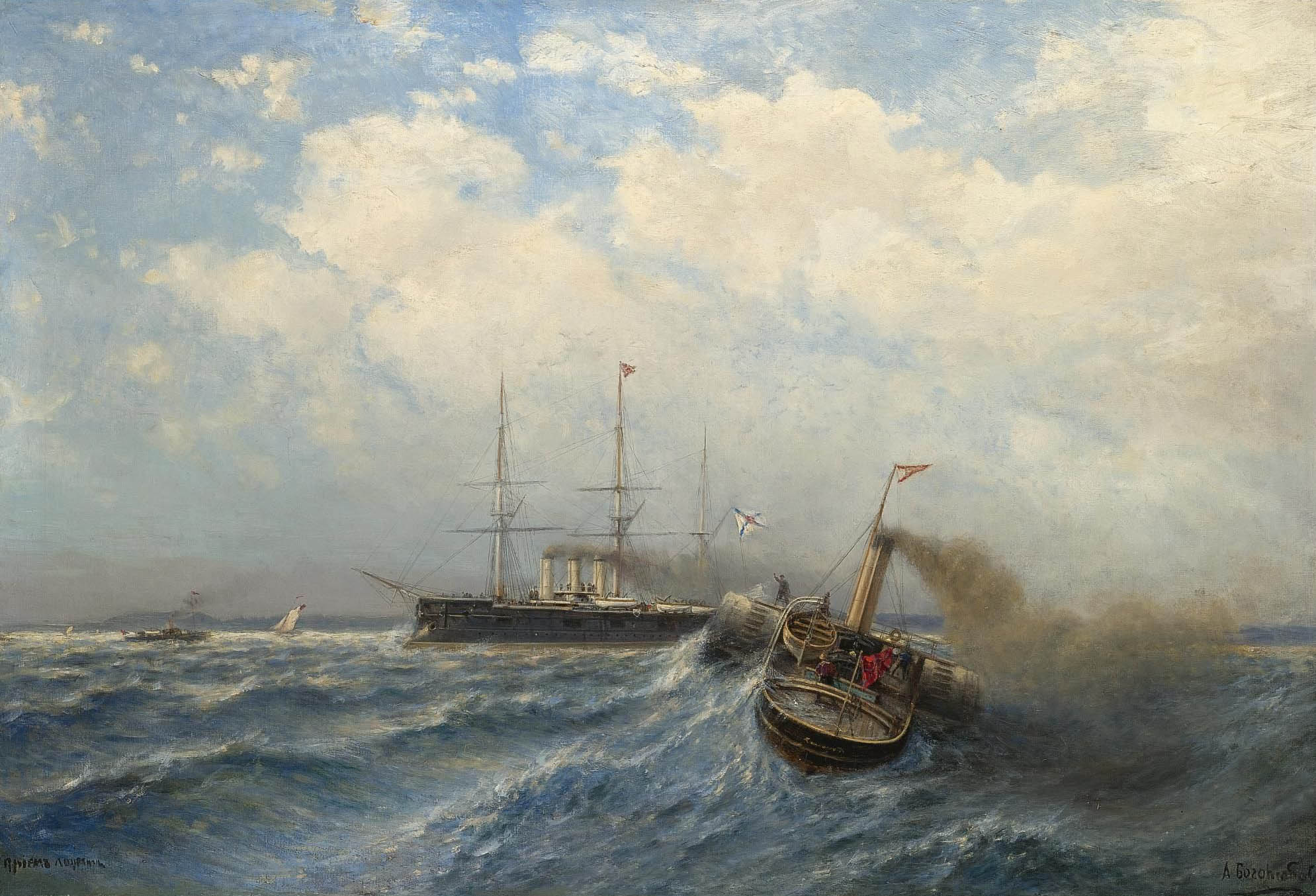
Pilots arriving aboard
Private collection

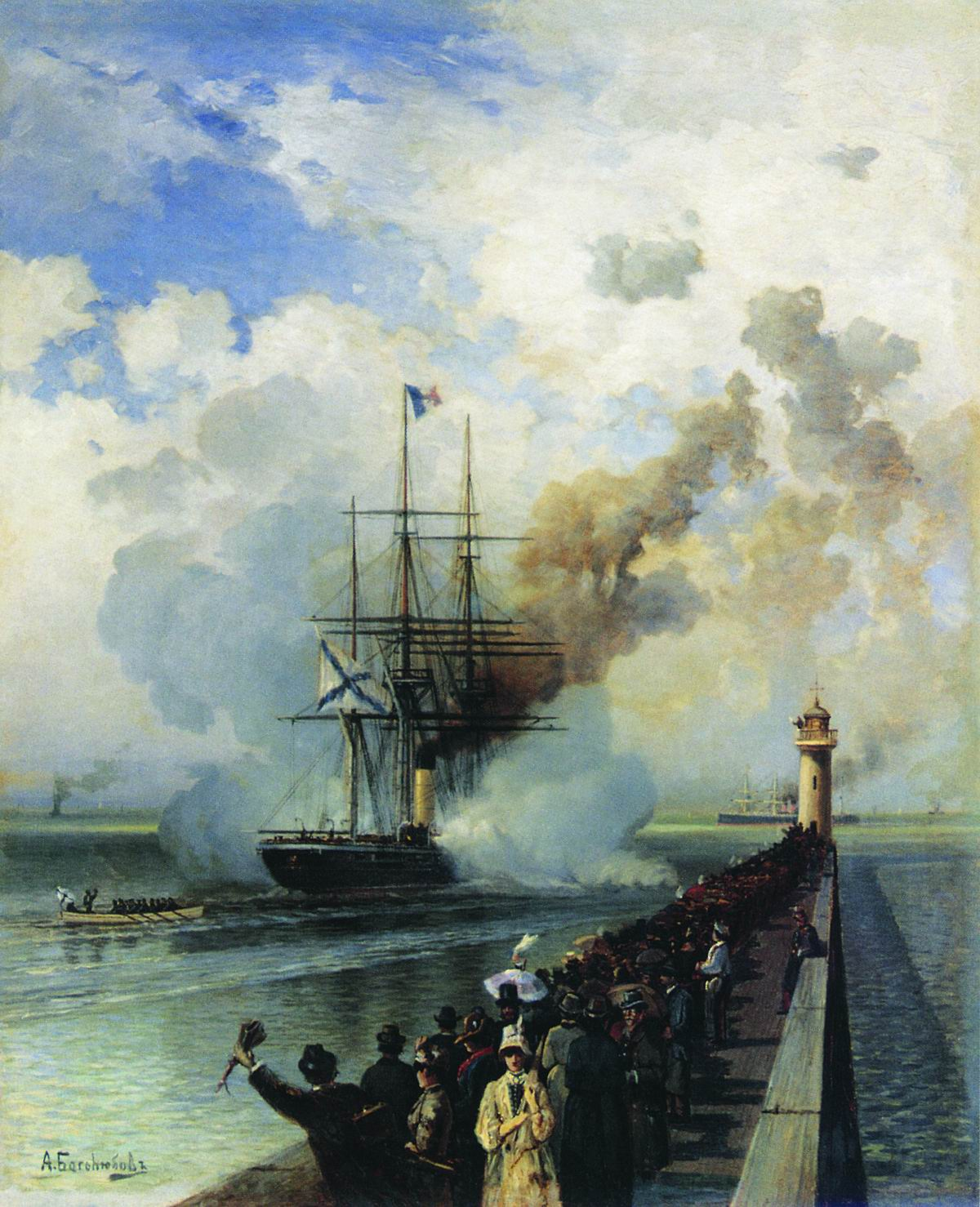
The frigate Razboynik, 'Rogue'

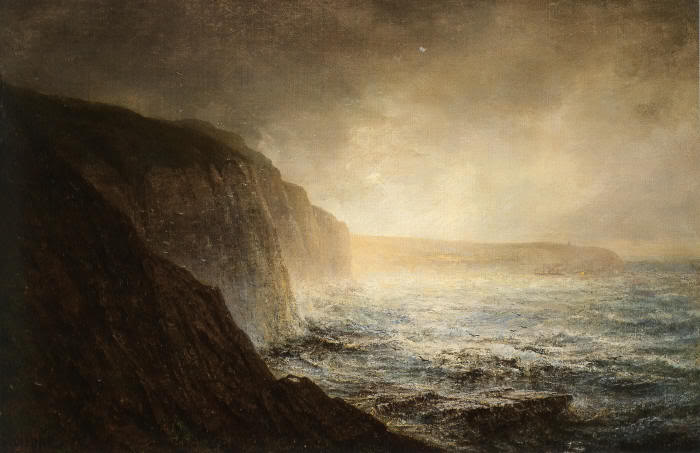
Coastal view

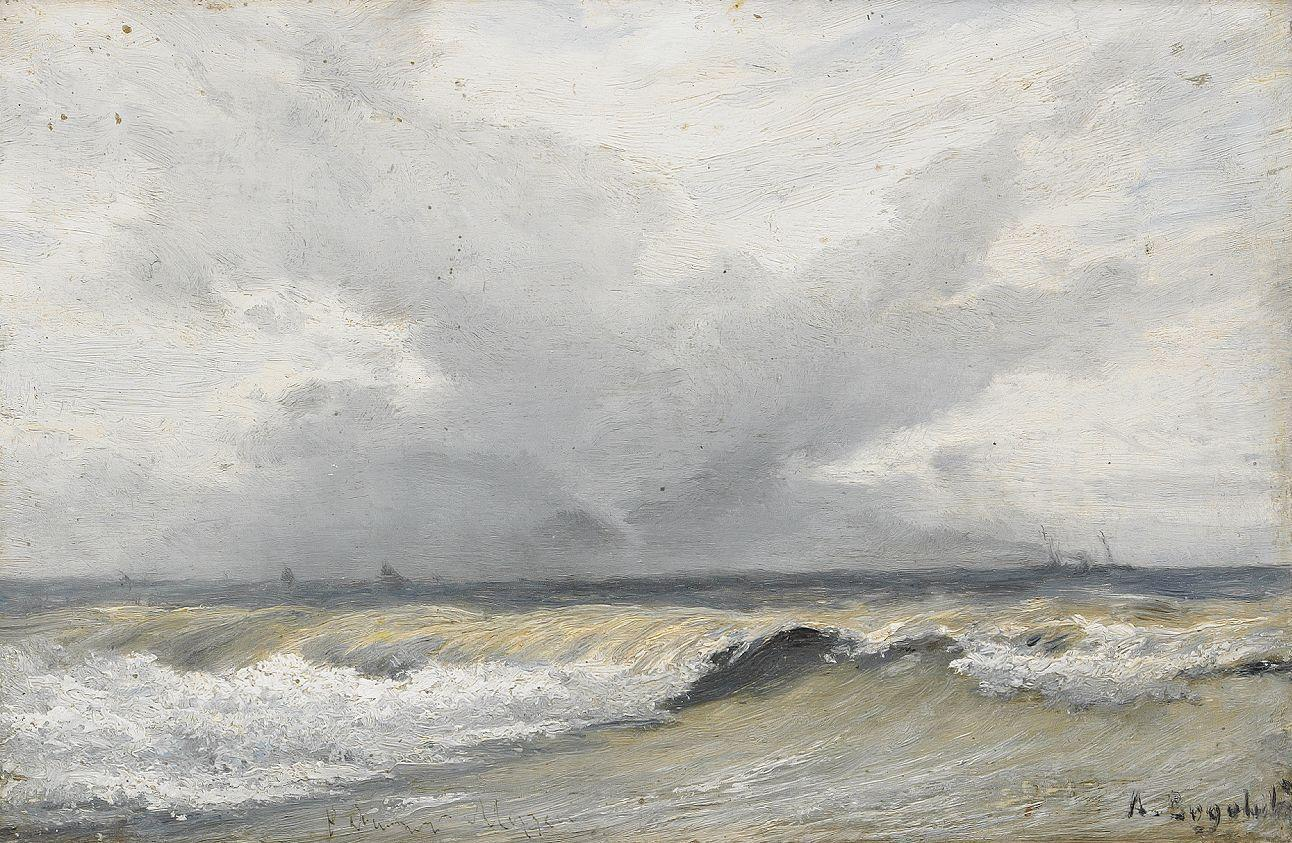
Coastal sceneru

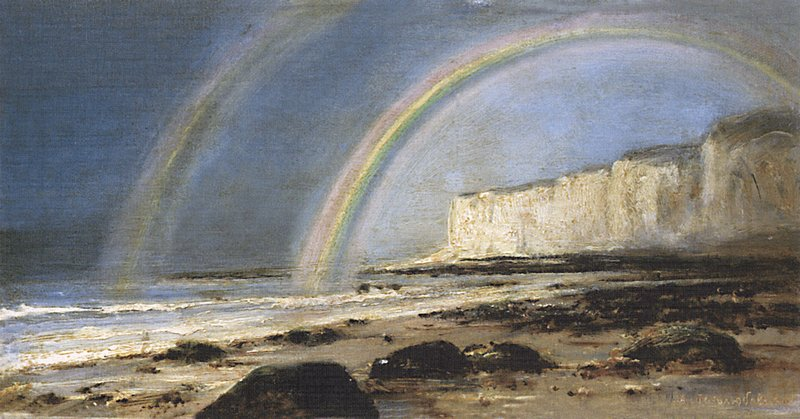
The Rainbow
Radishchev Art Museum

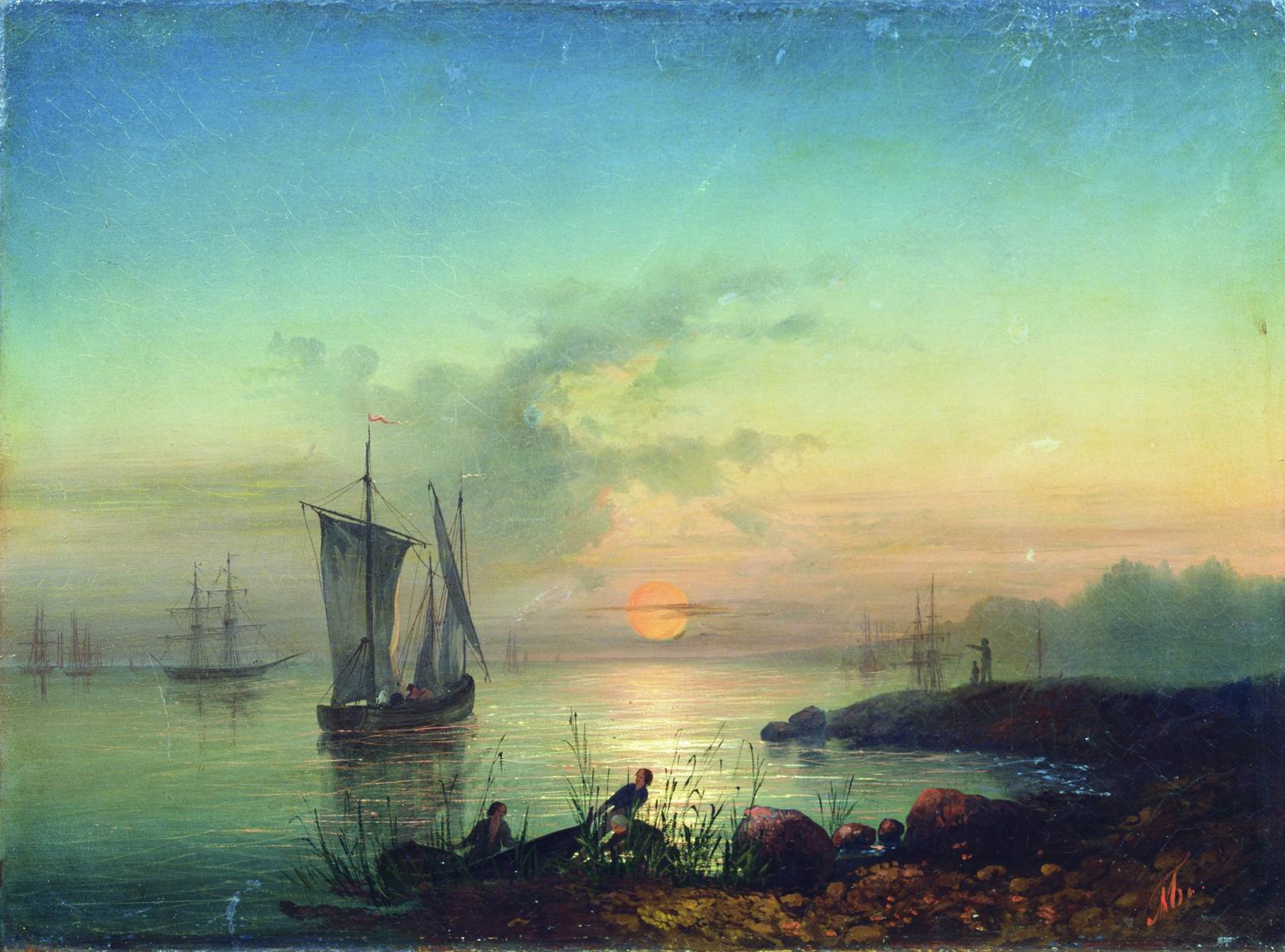
Sunset by the sea
Kherson Art Museum

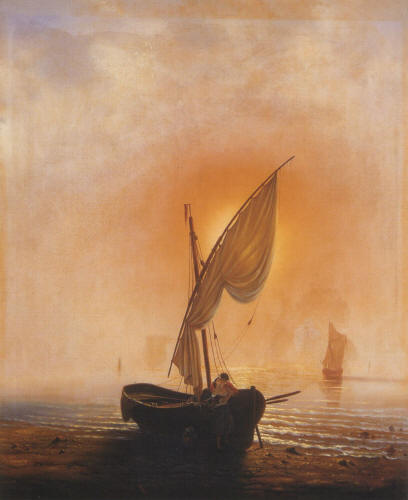
The theme of two lovers meeting at sunset on the seashore near a pulwar.
Russian Empire

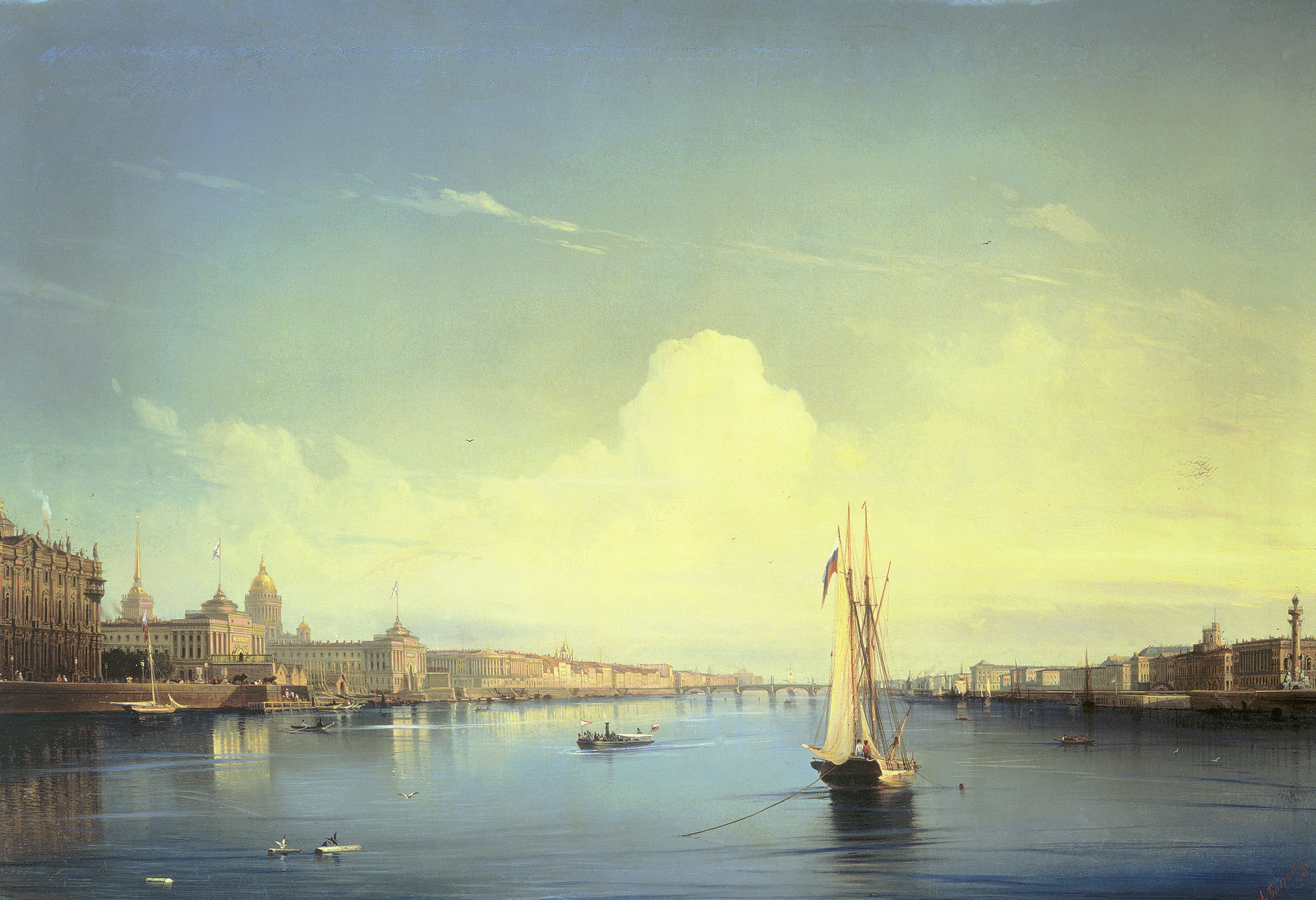
Petersburg at sunset 1850

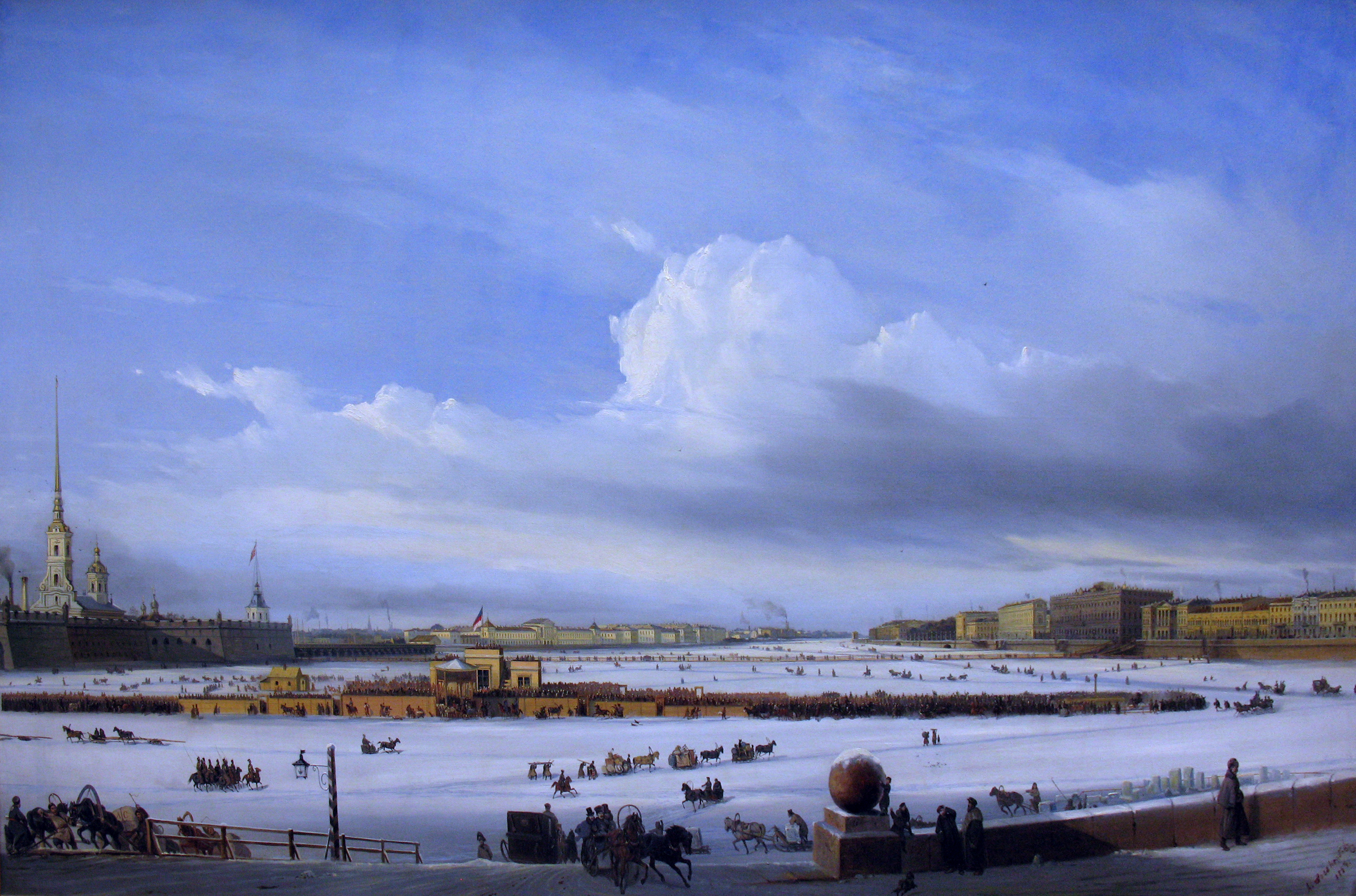
St. Petersburg. Sledging on the Neva, 1854 (full painting)
Tretyakov Gallery

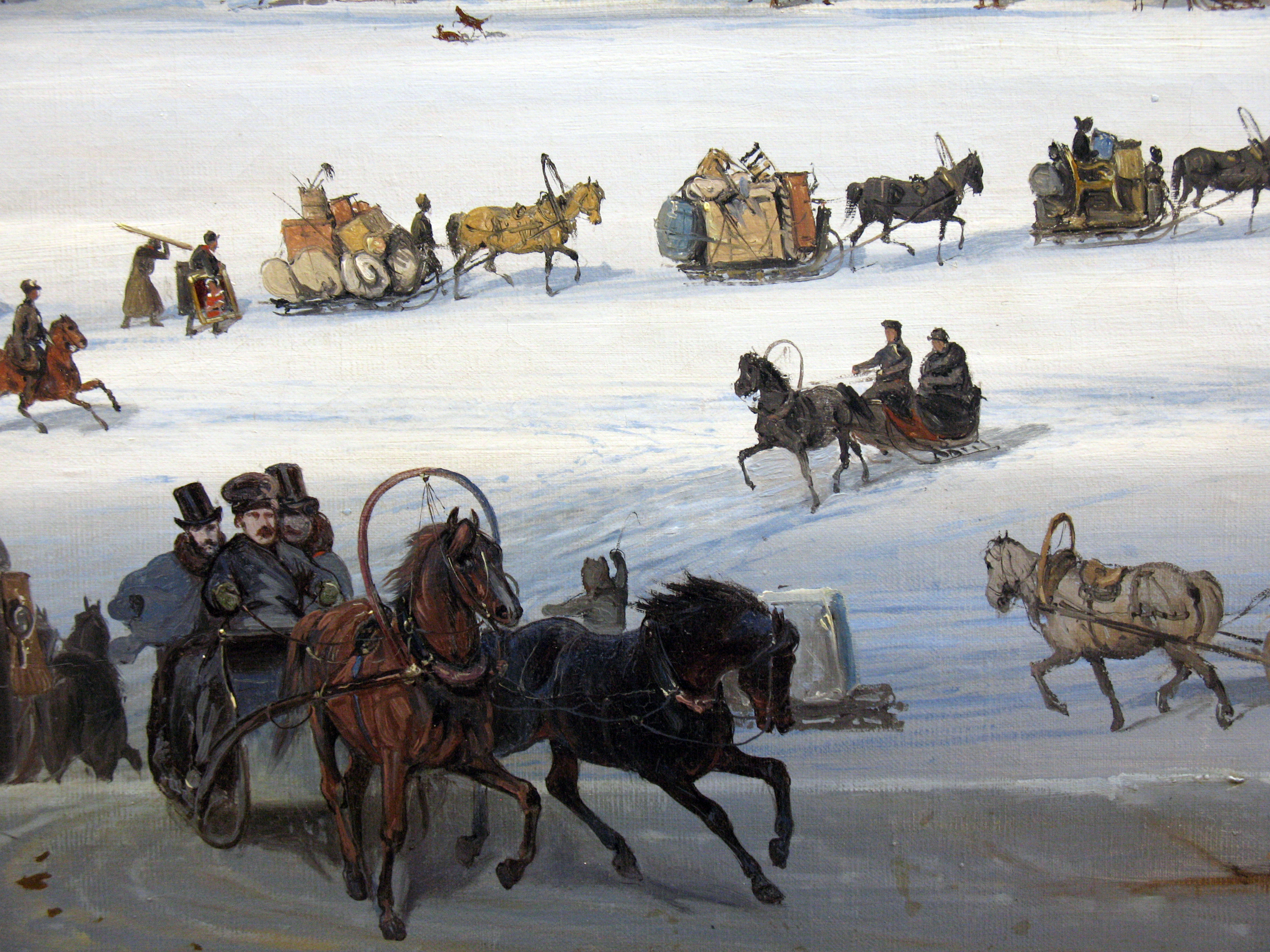
Sledging on the Neva (detail)

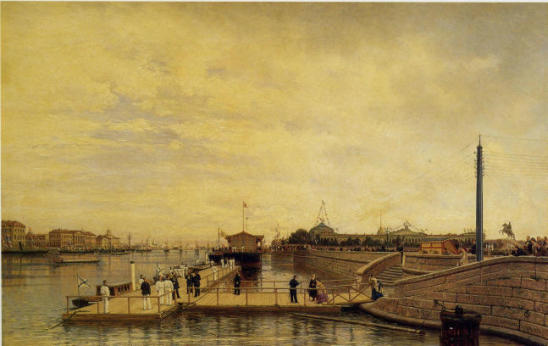
Bolshaya Neva. The painting in 1872.

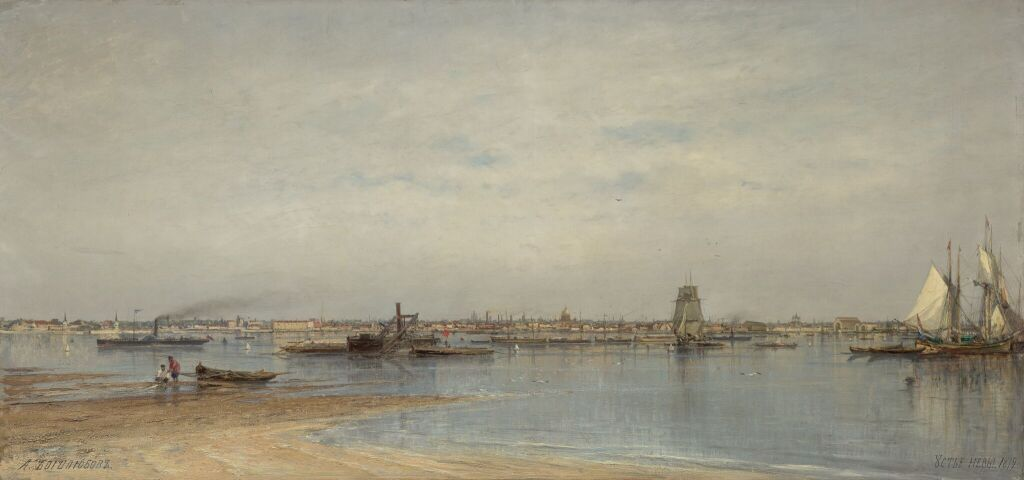
Mouth of the Neva, 1872
Tretyakov Gallery

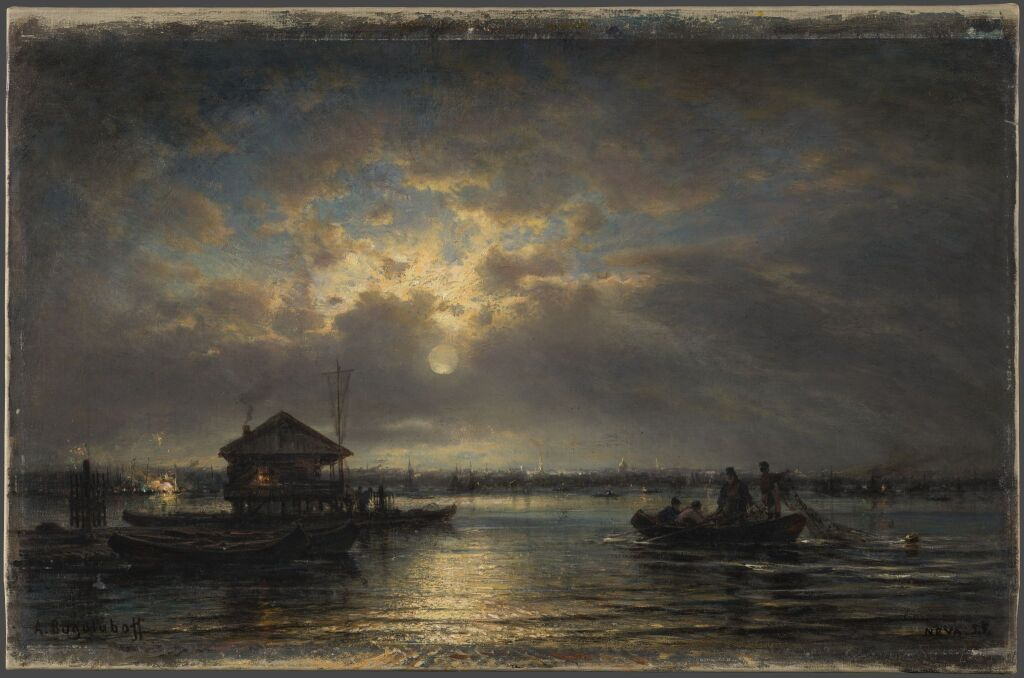
Summer Night on the Neva at the Seaside. 1875
Tretyakov Gallery

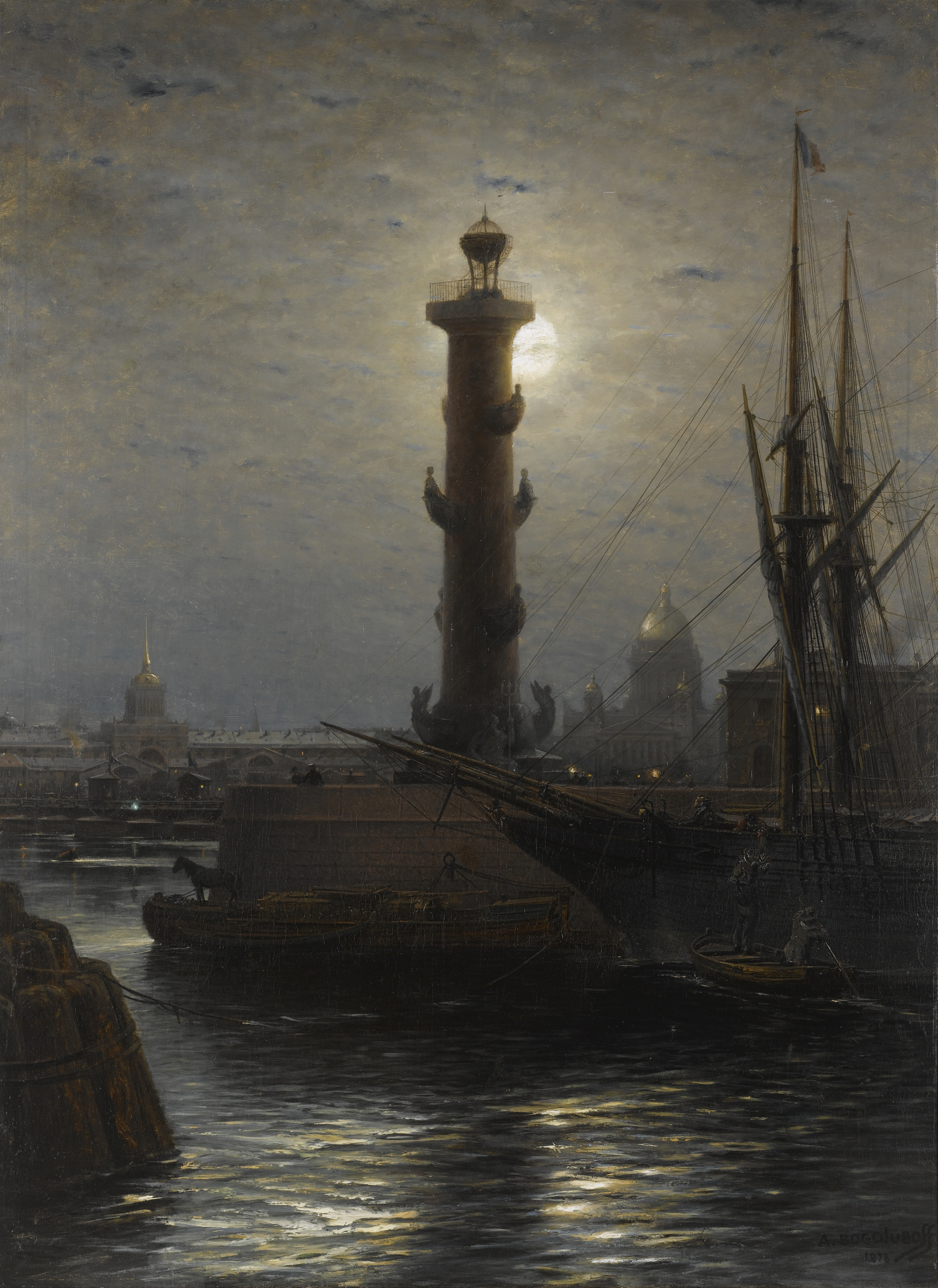
Old Saint Petersburg Stock Exchange and Rostral Columns, 1878

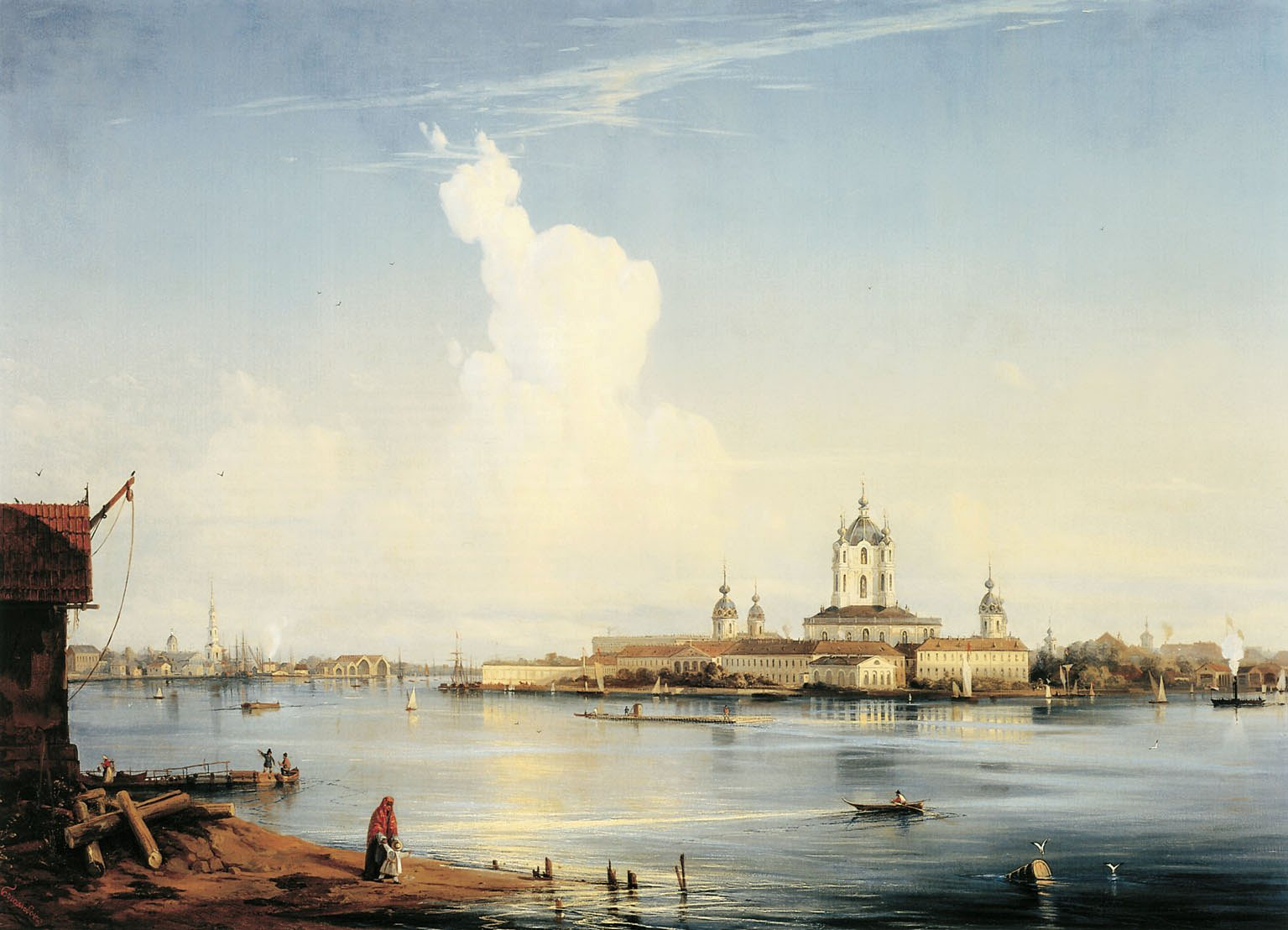
View of the Smolny Convent from Bolshaya Okhta, 1851

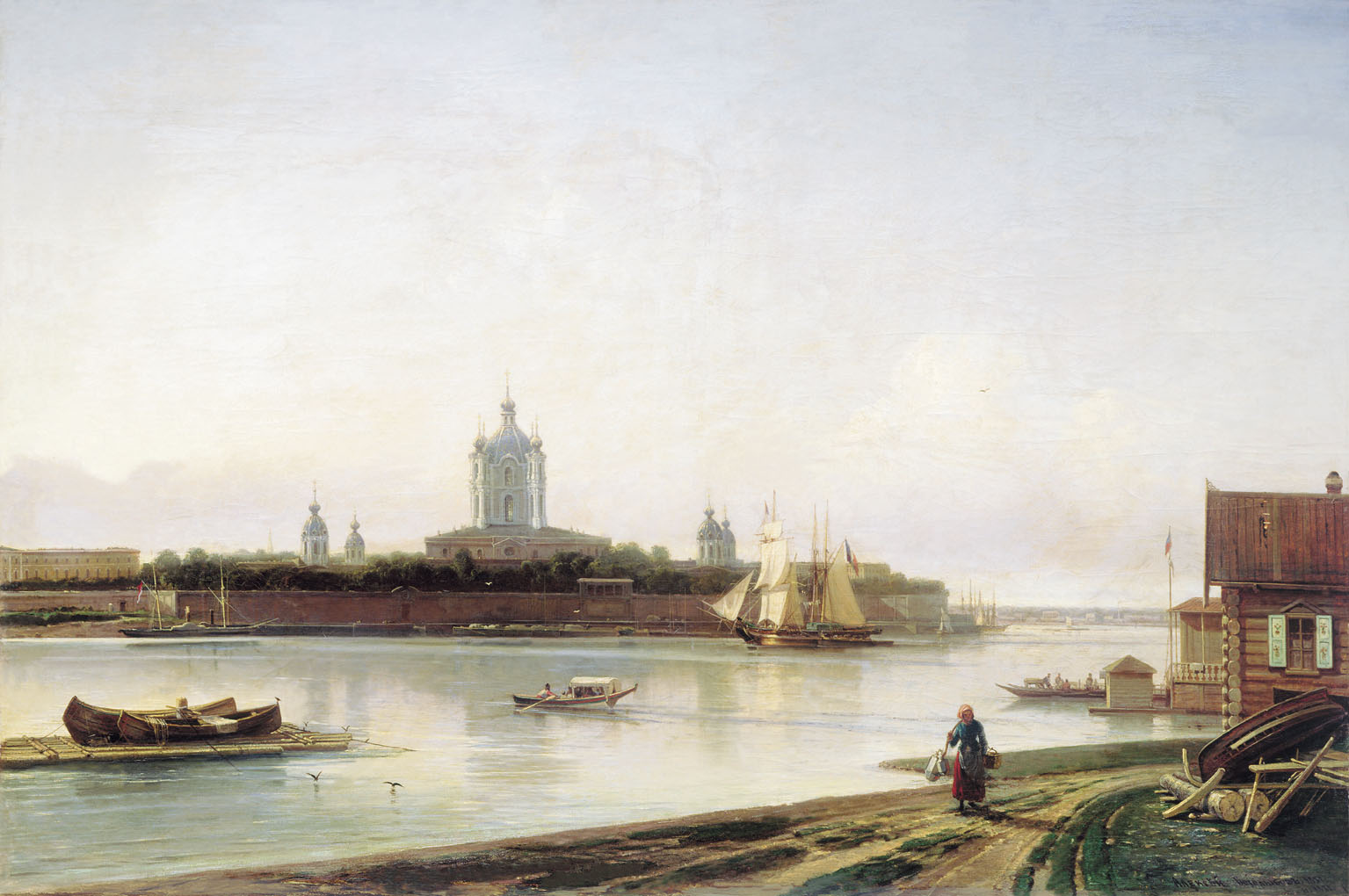
Smolny as seen from Bolshaya Okhta, 1870s

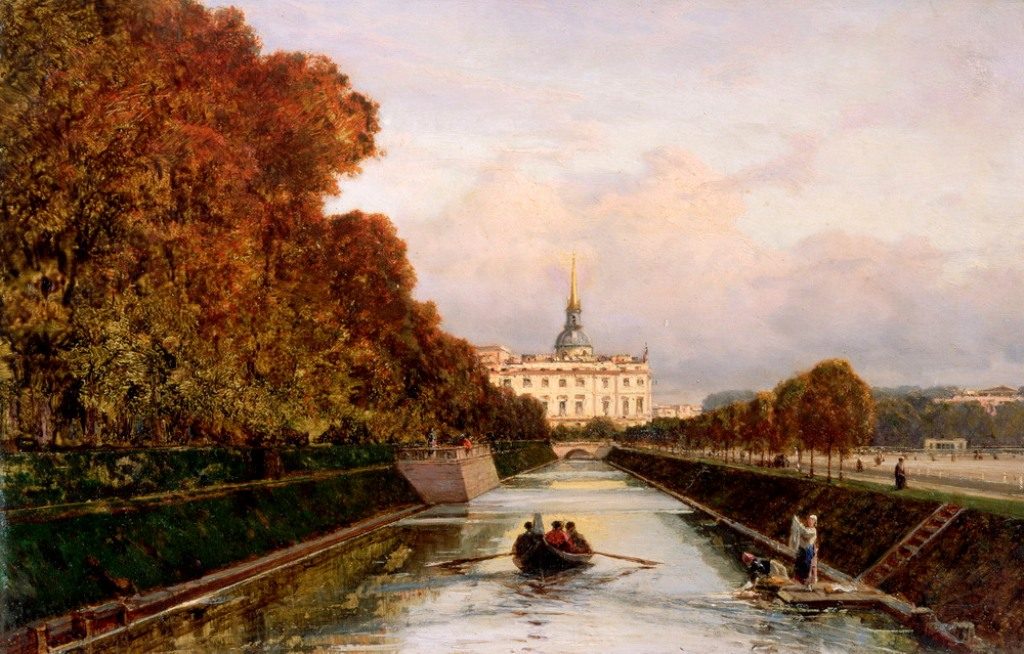
View to Saint Michael's Castle in Petersburg from the Lebyazhy Canal, 1880s

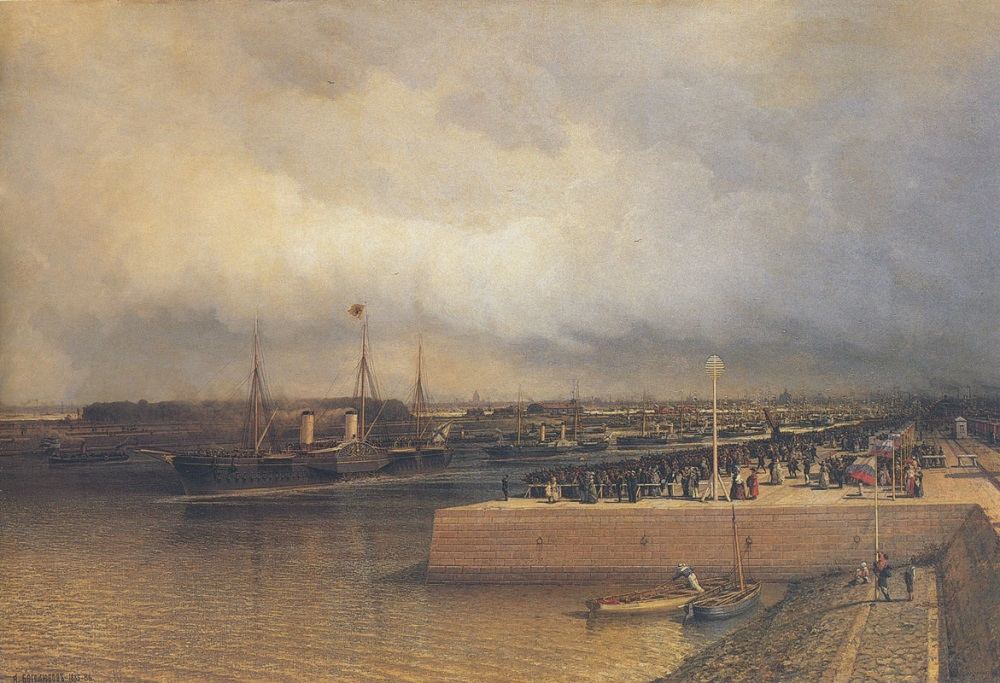
Opening of the Saint Petersburg Sea Canal in 1886

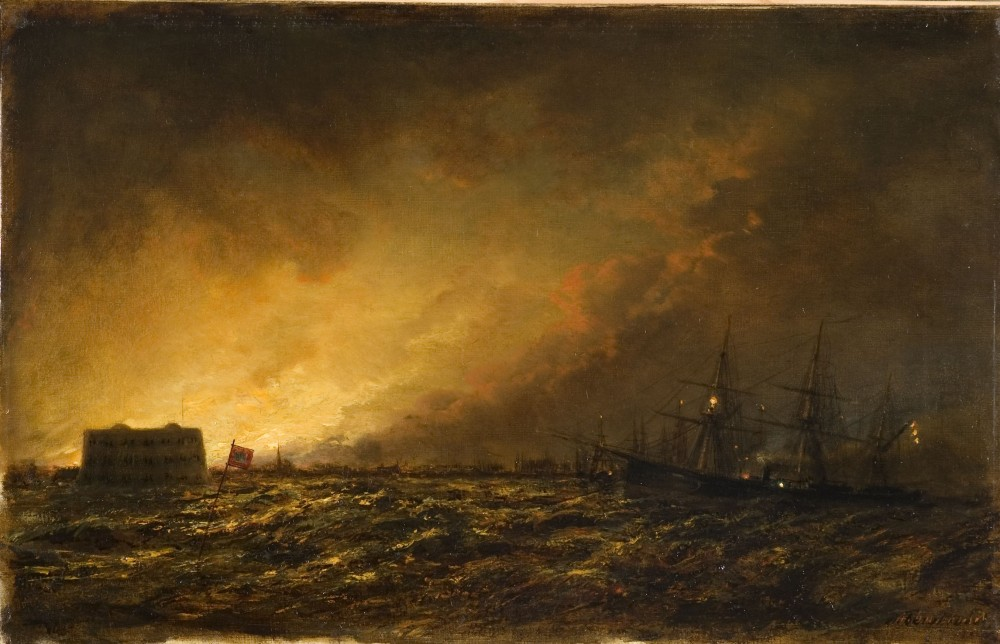
Fire in Kronstadt at Night, c. 1876

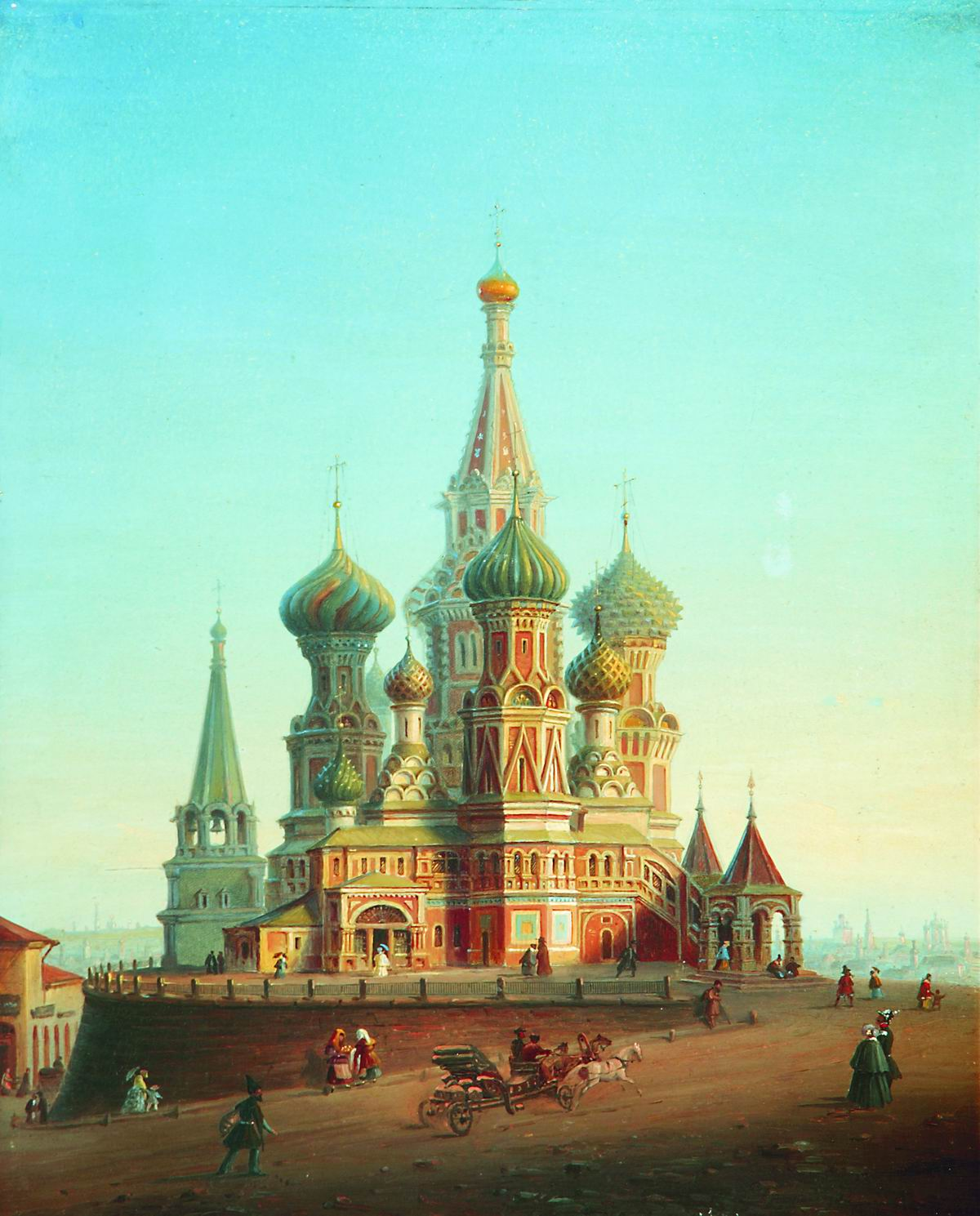
Saint Basil's Cathedral
Private collection

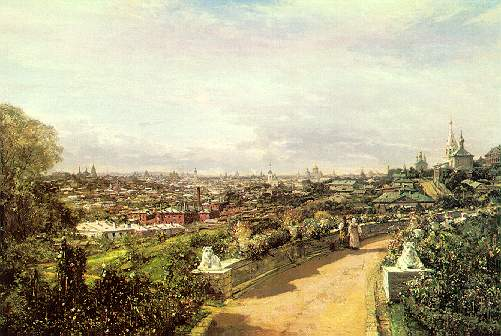
View of Moscow from the house of G. I. Hludov, 1878.

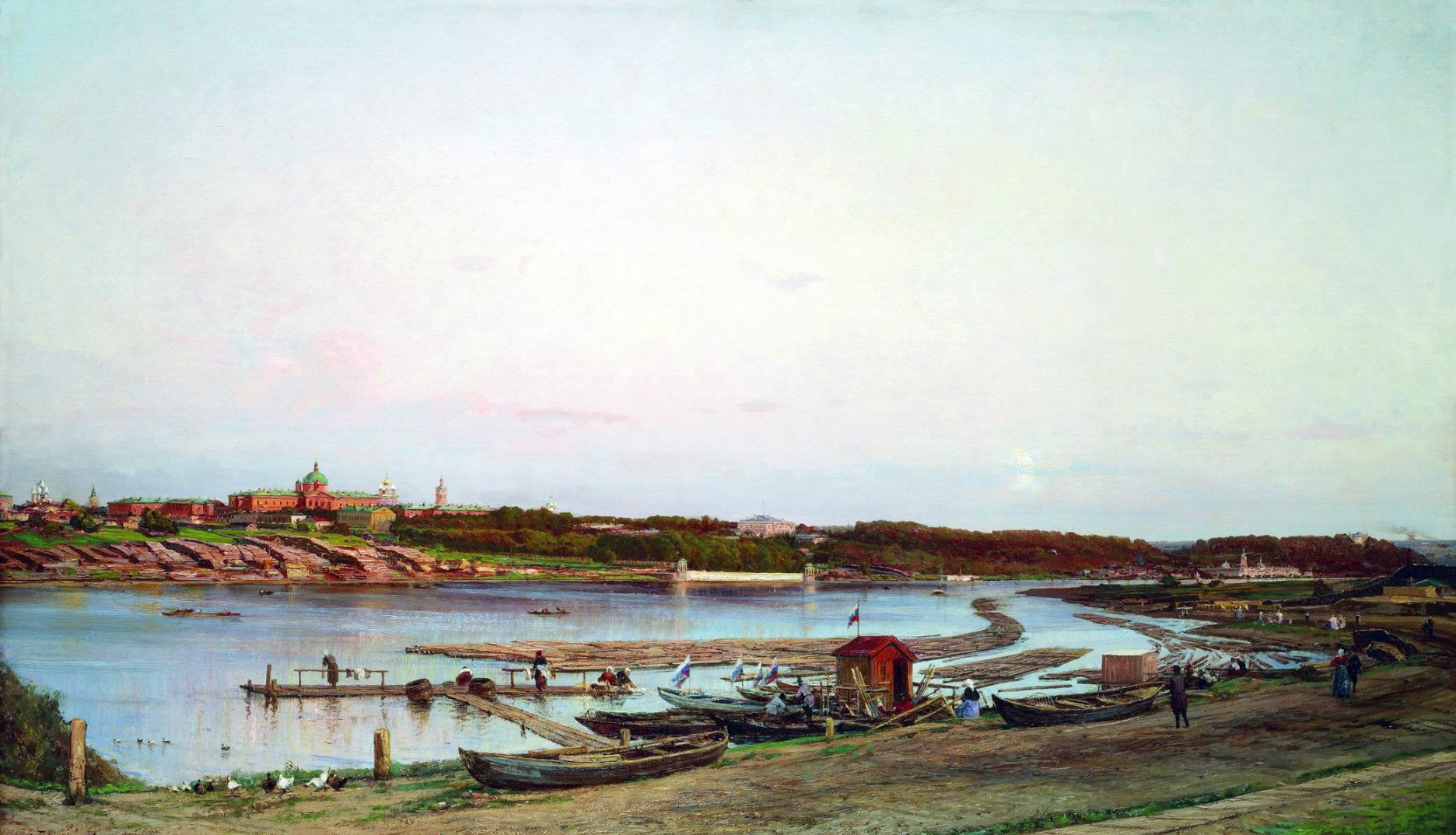
Moscow. View of Golitsyn Hospital and Neskuchnoye in 1879.

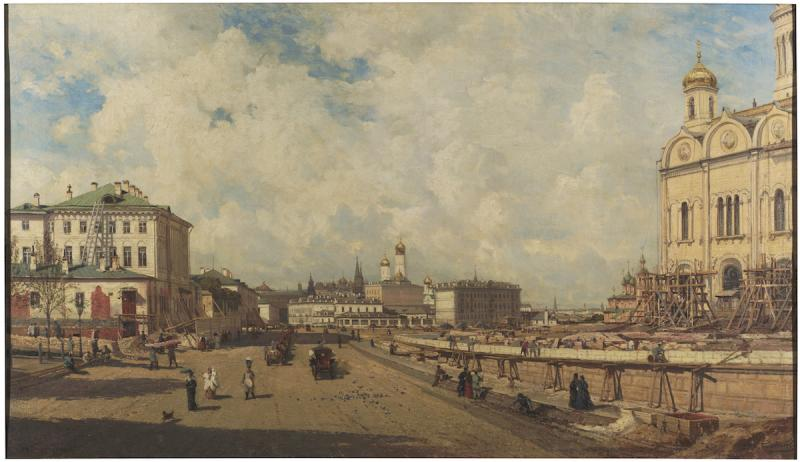
Cathedral of Christ the Saviour, 1880

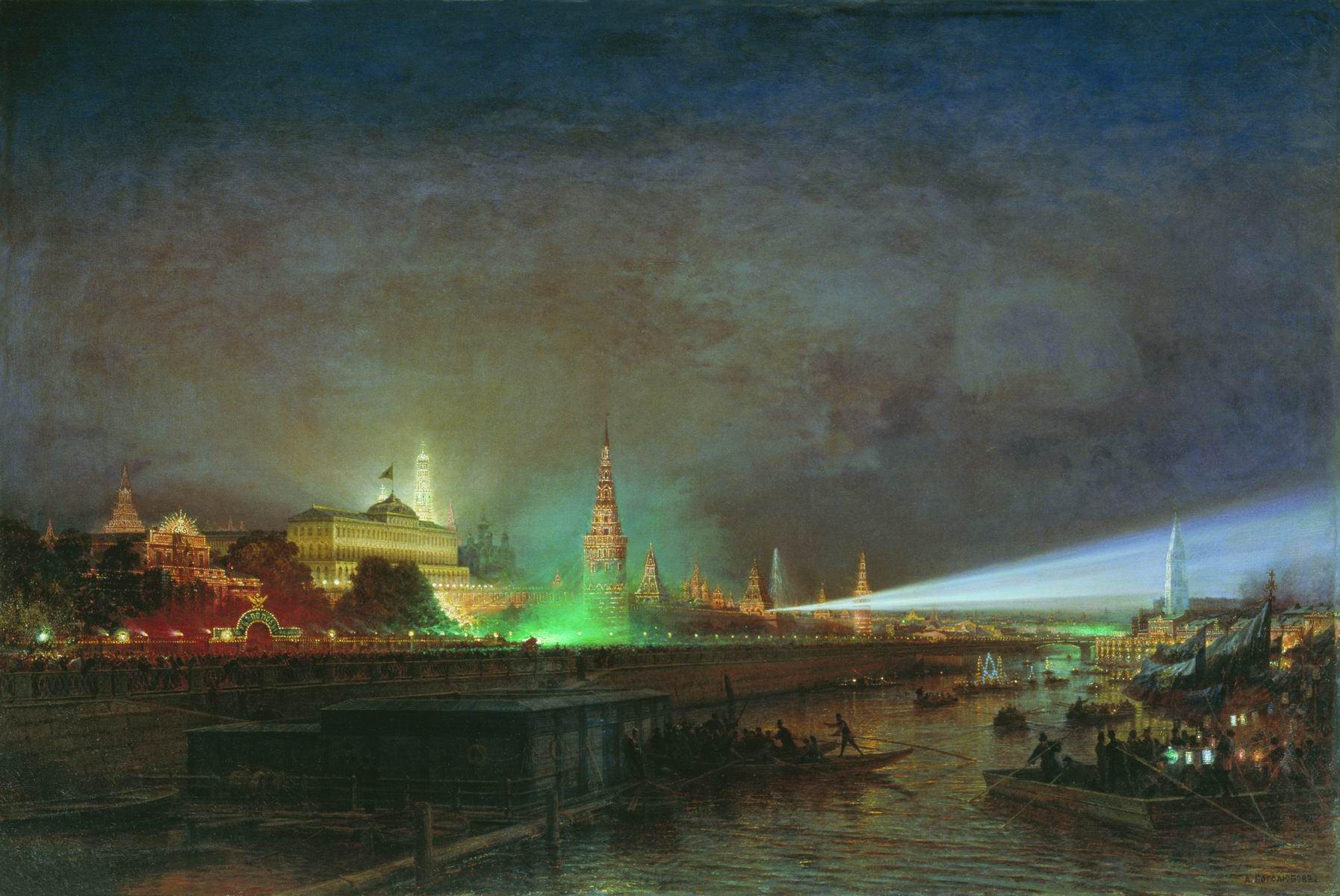
Kremlin illumination in 1883

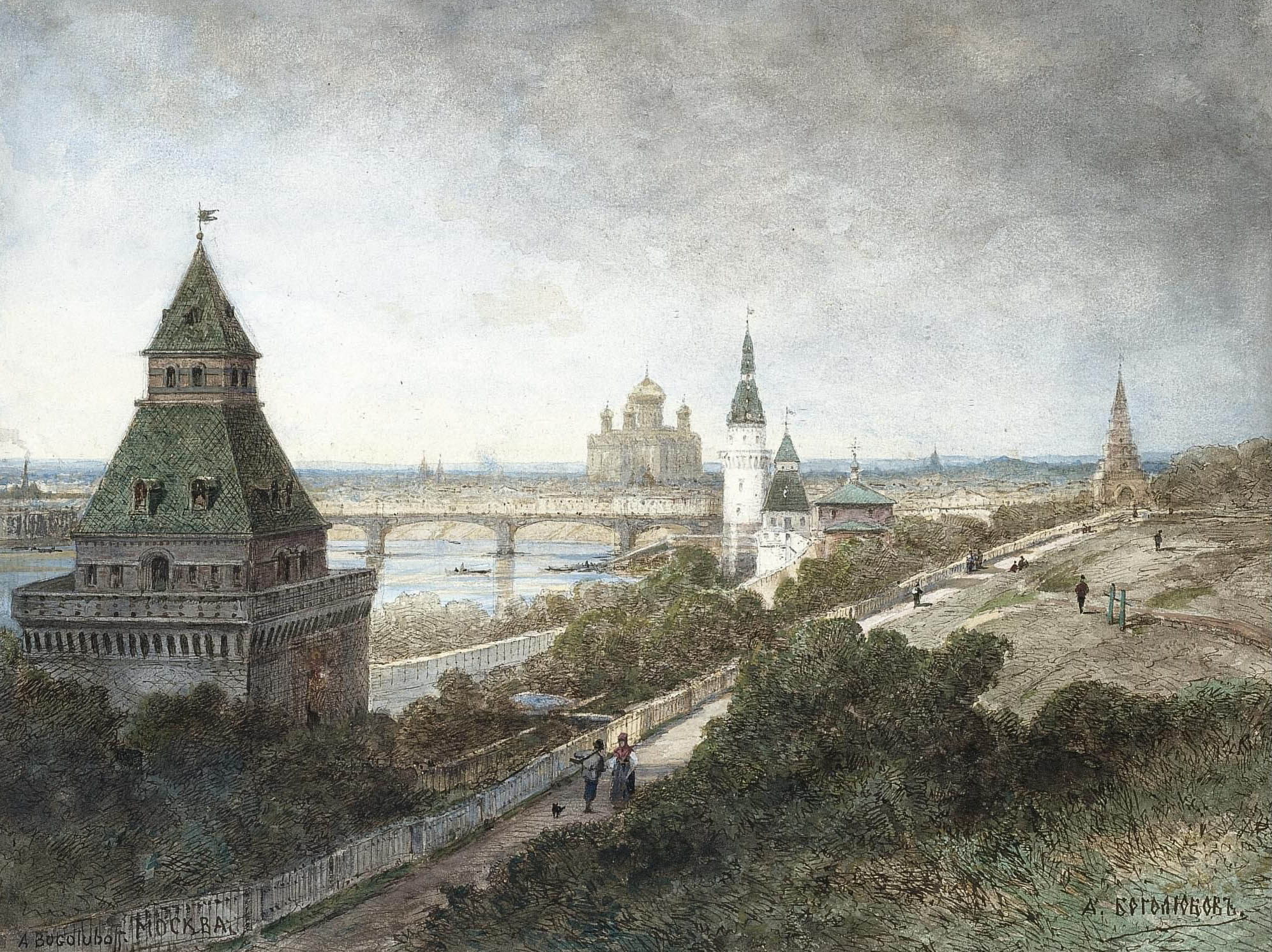
View of Moscow
Private collection

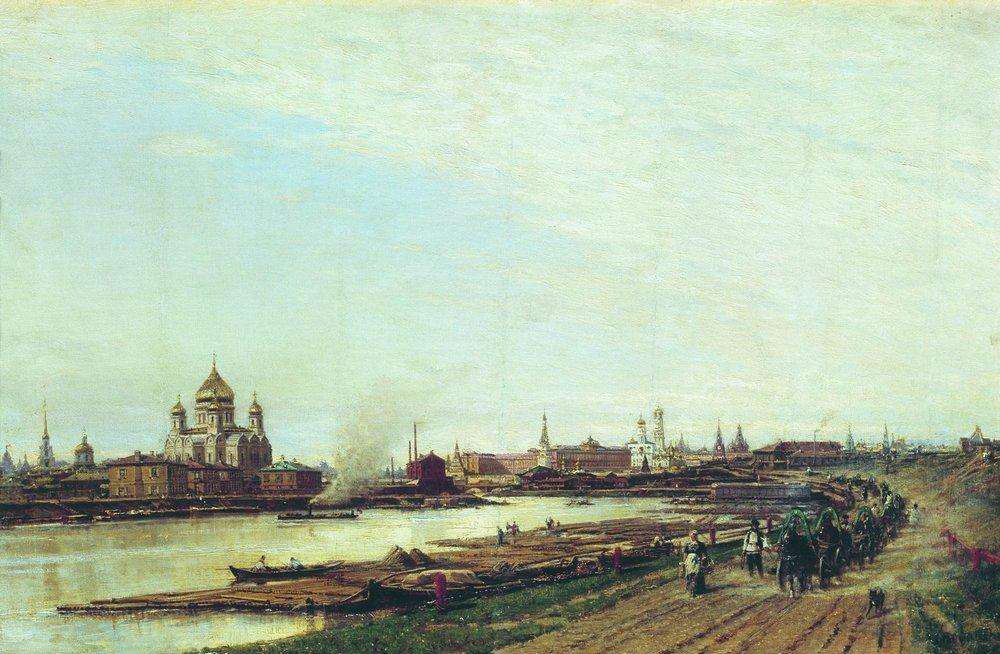
View of Moscow from Babiy Gorodok, 1880s

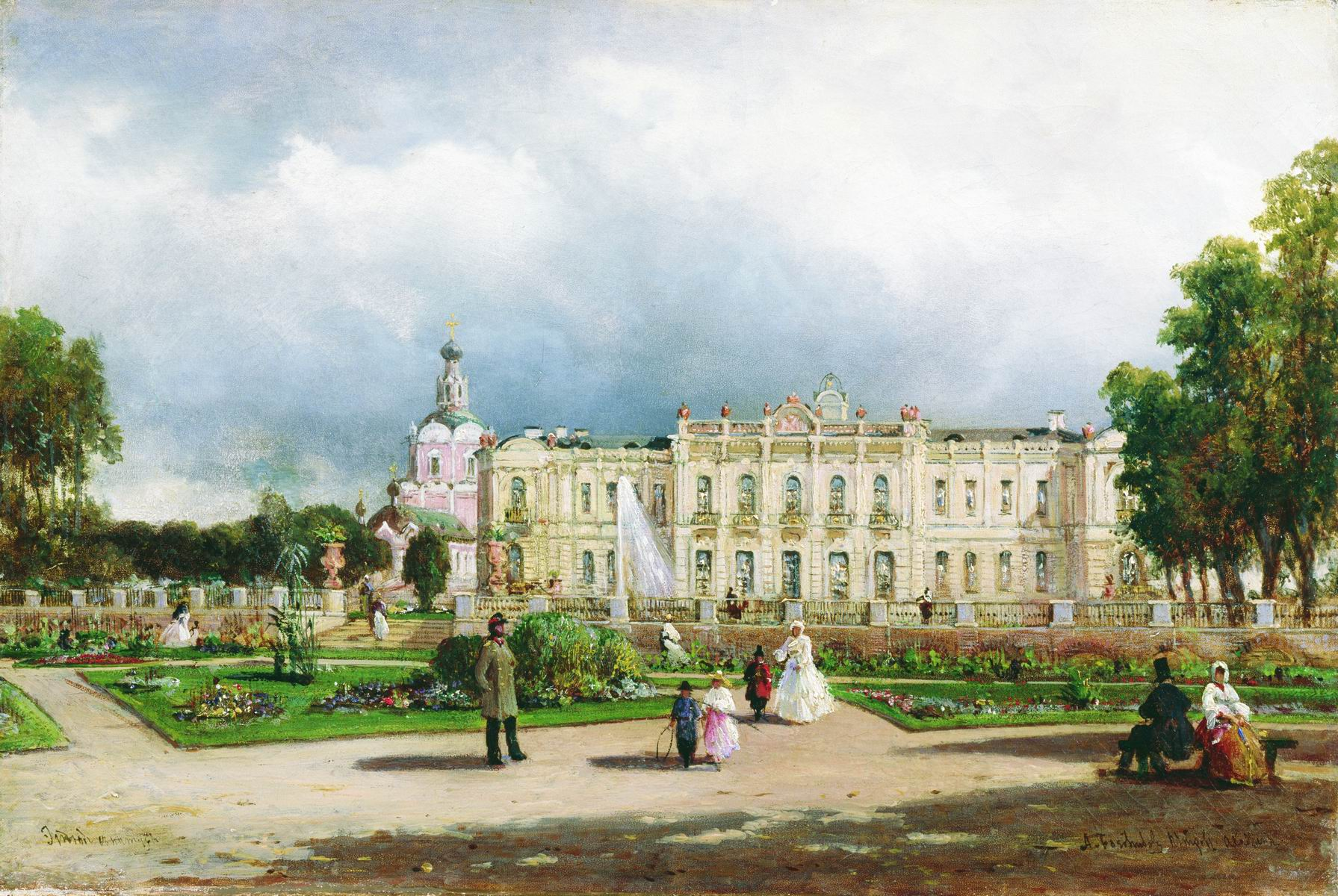
Peter's Agricultural Academy in Moscow

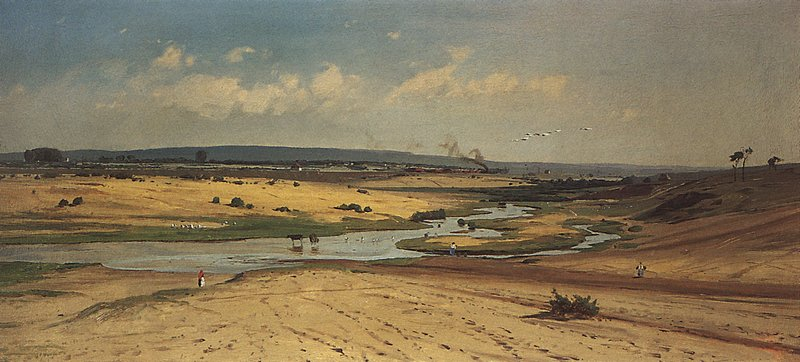
The Moskva River near Zvenigorod
Radishchev Art Museum

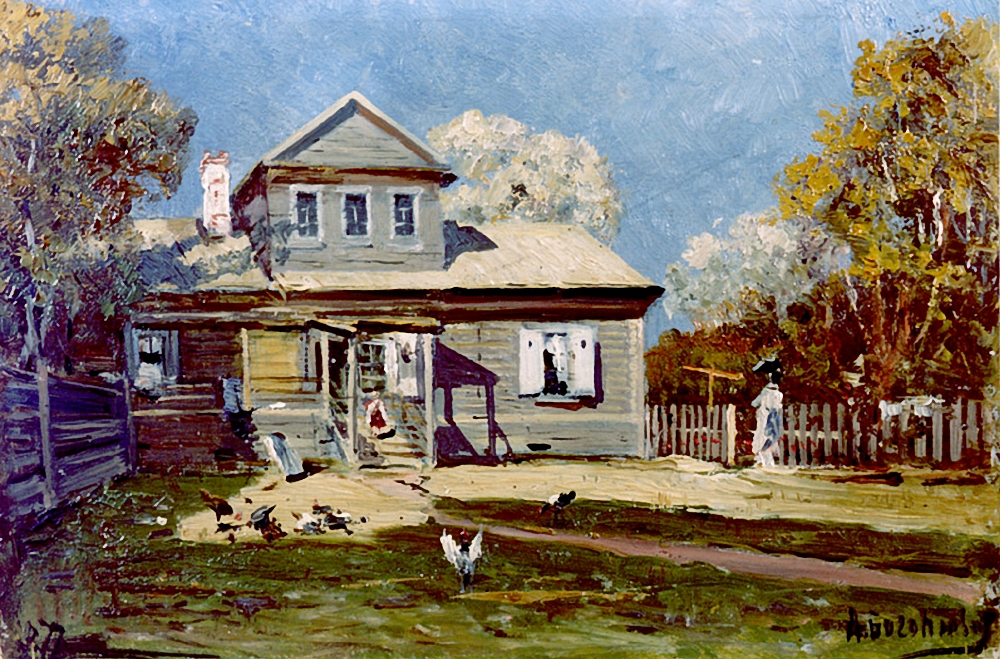
The dacha of Bogolyubov and N. P. Nechayeva (Bogolyubova)

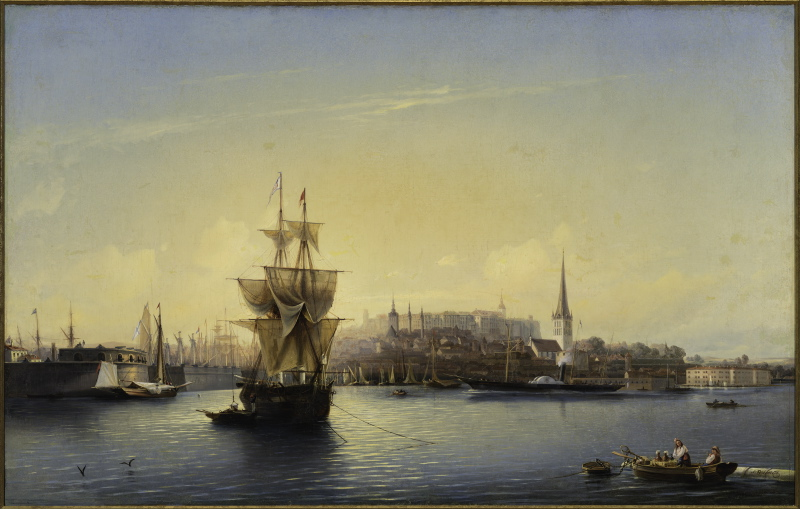
Port of Reval, 1853.
Art Museum of Estonia

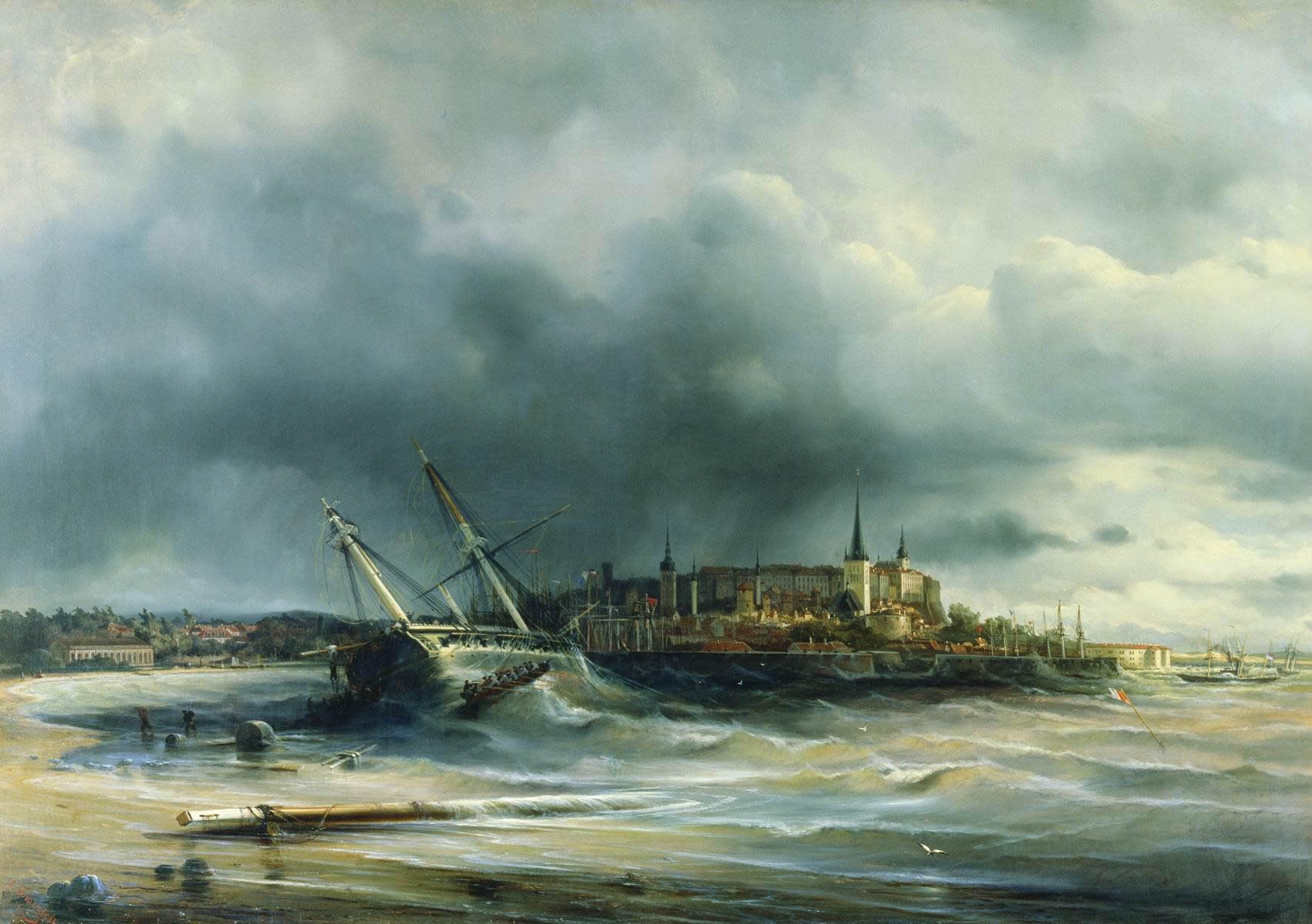
Reval, 1853

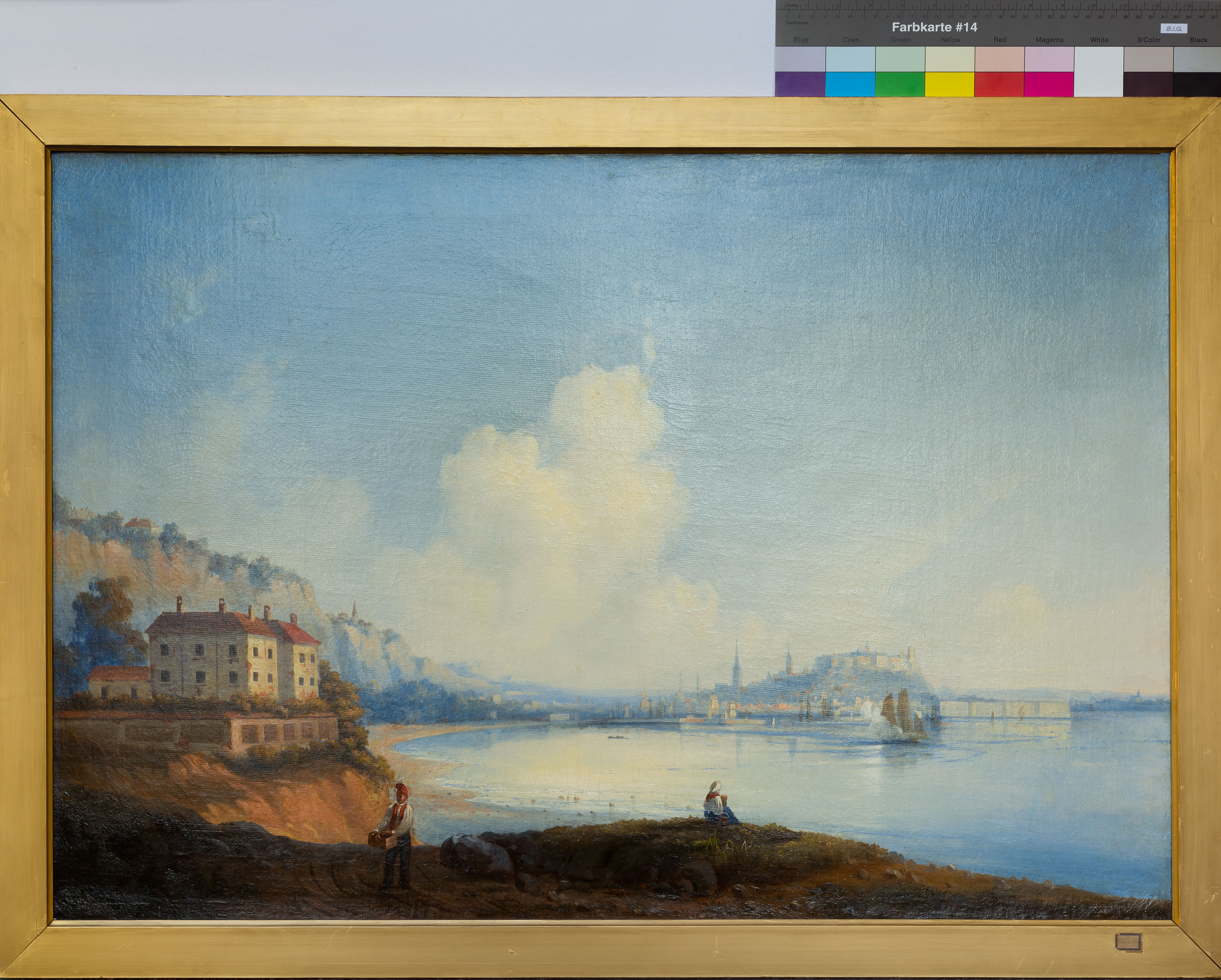
View of Reval from Suhkrumäe, 1853

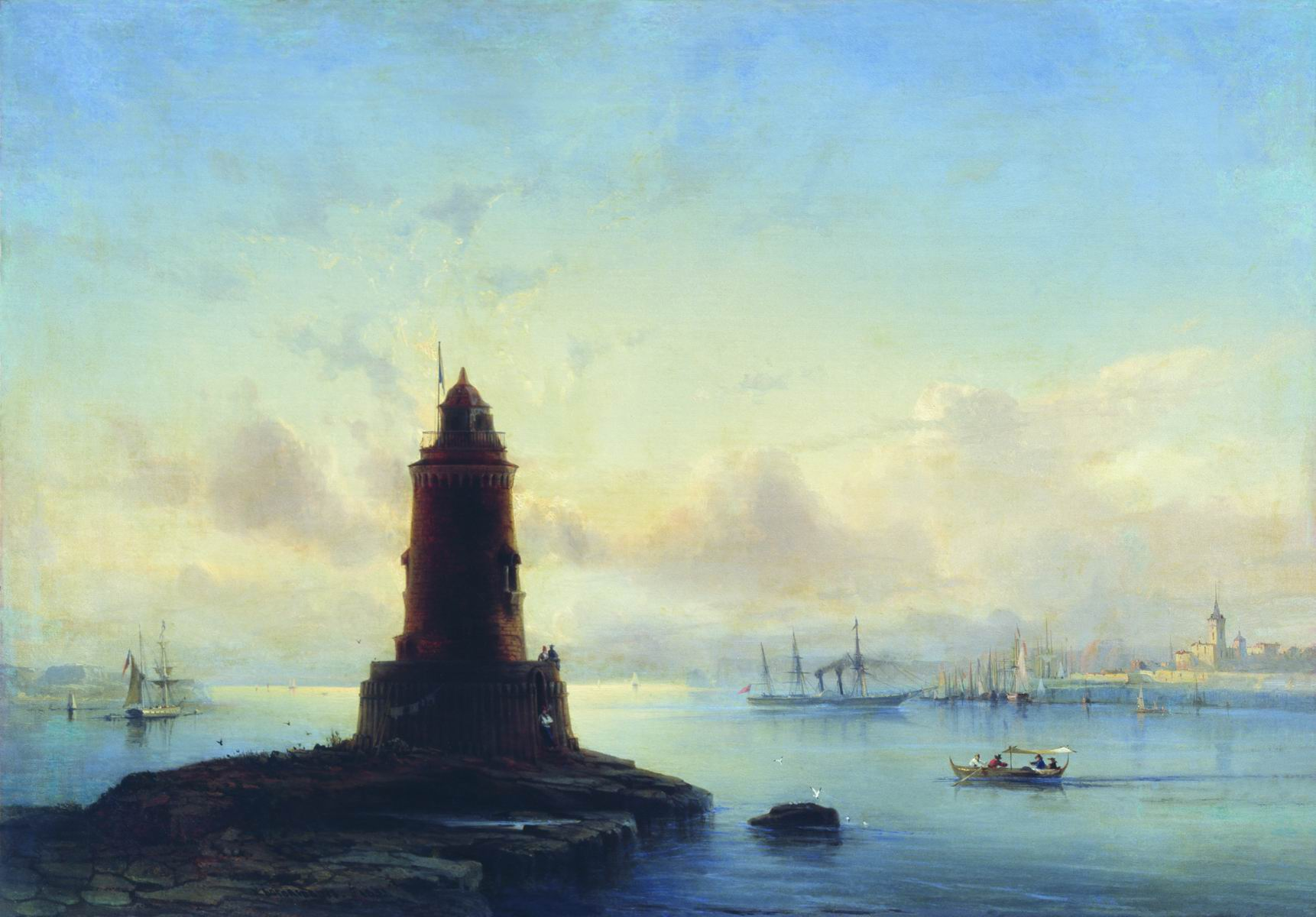
View of Reval. Lighthouse (Marina with lighthouse), 1853

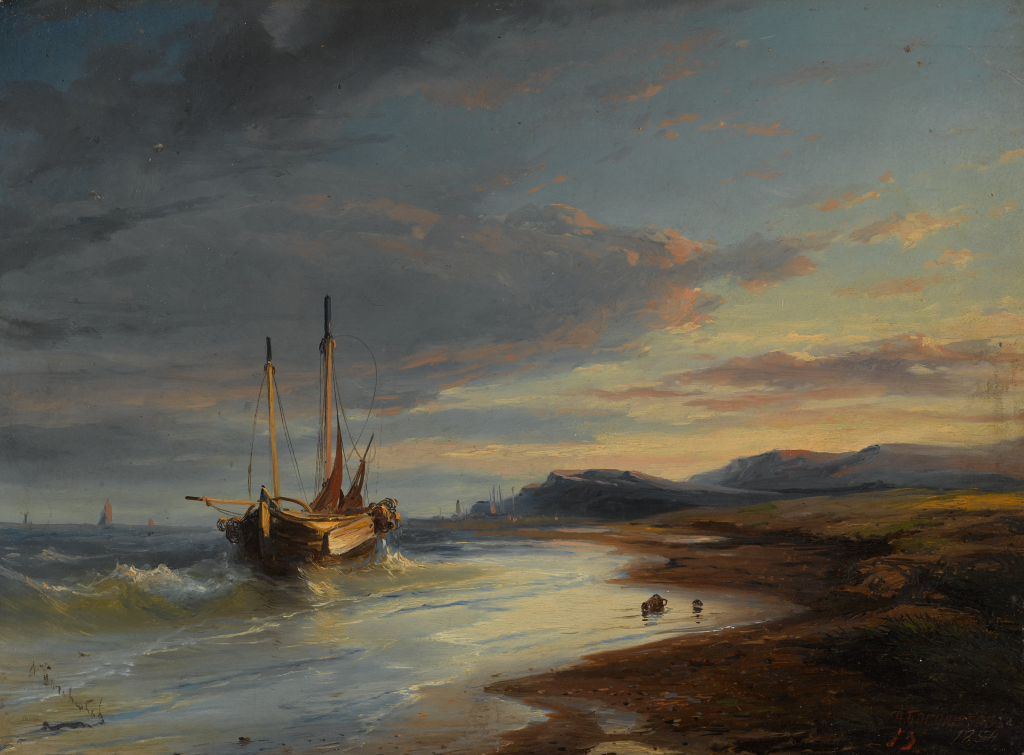
Offing (Baltics) (1854)
Tretyakov Gallery

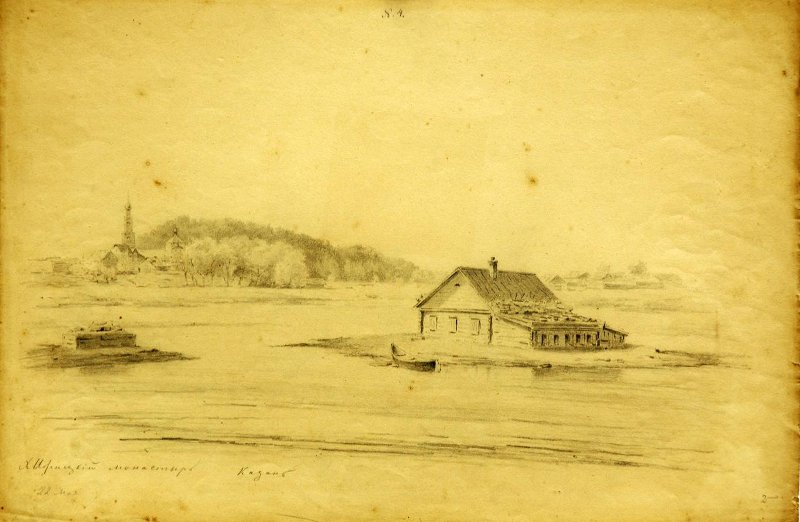
Kizichesky Monastery, 1861

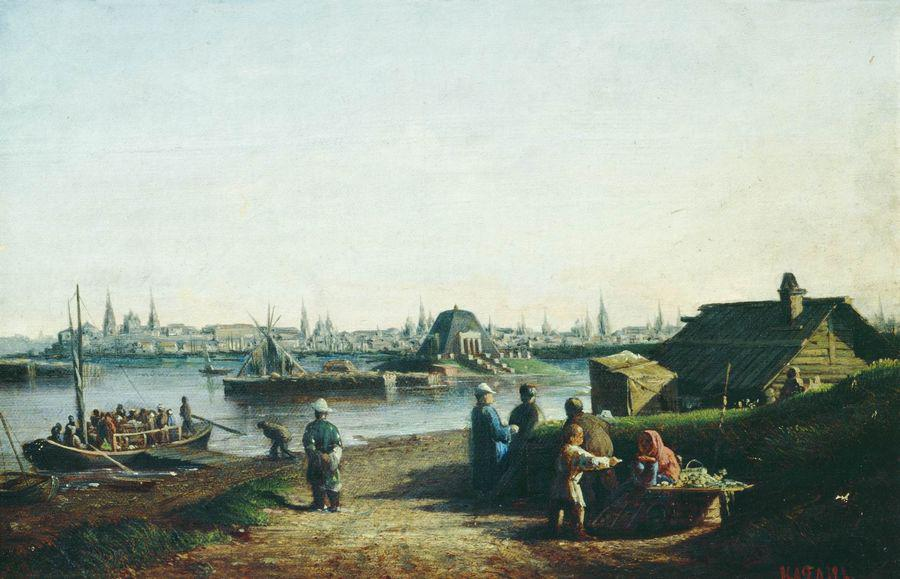
View of Kazan. 1861.
The Russian Museum

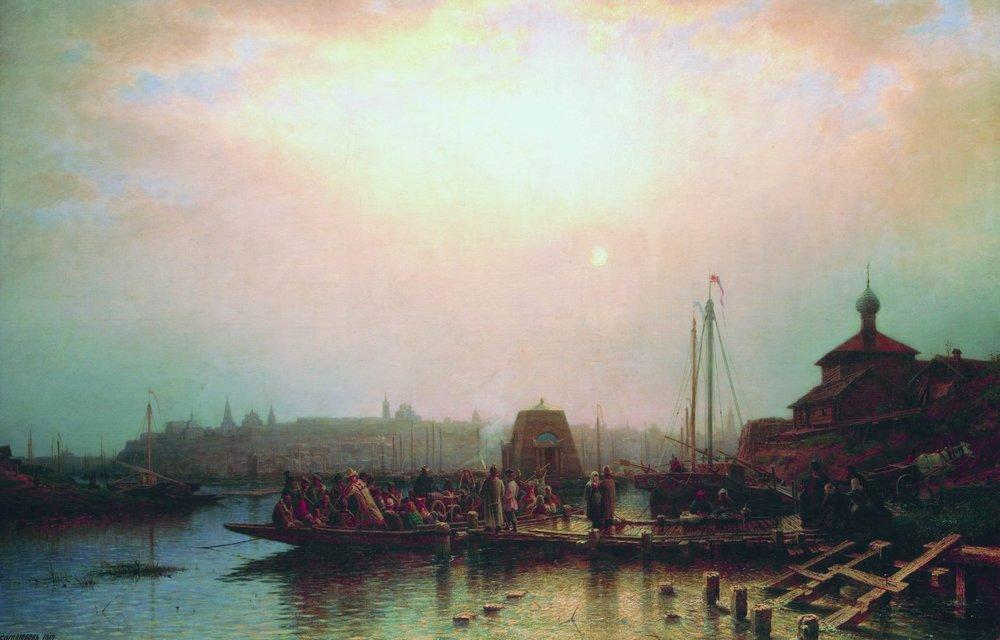
Kazan in 1862

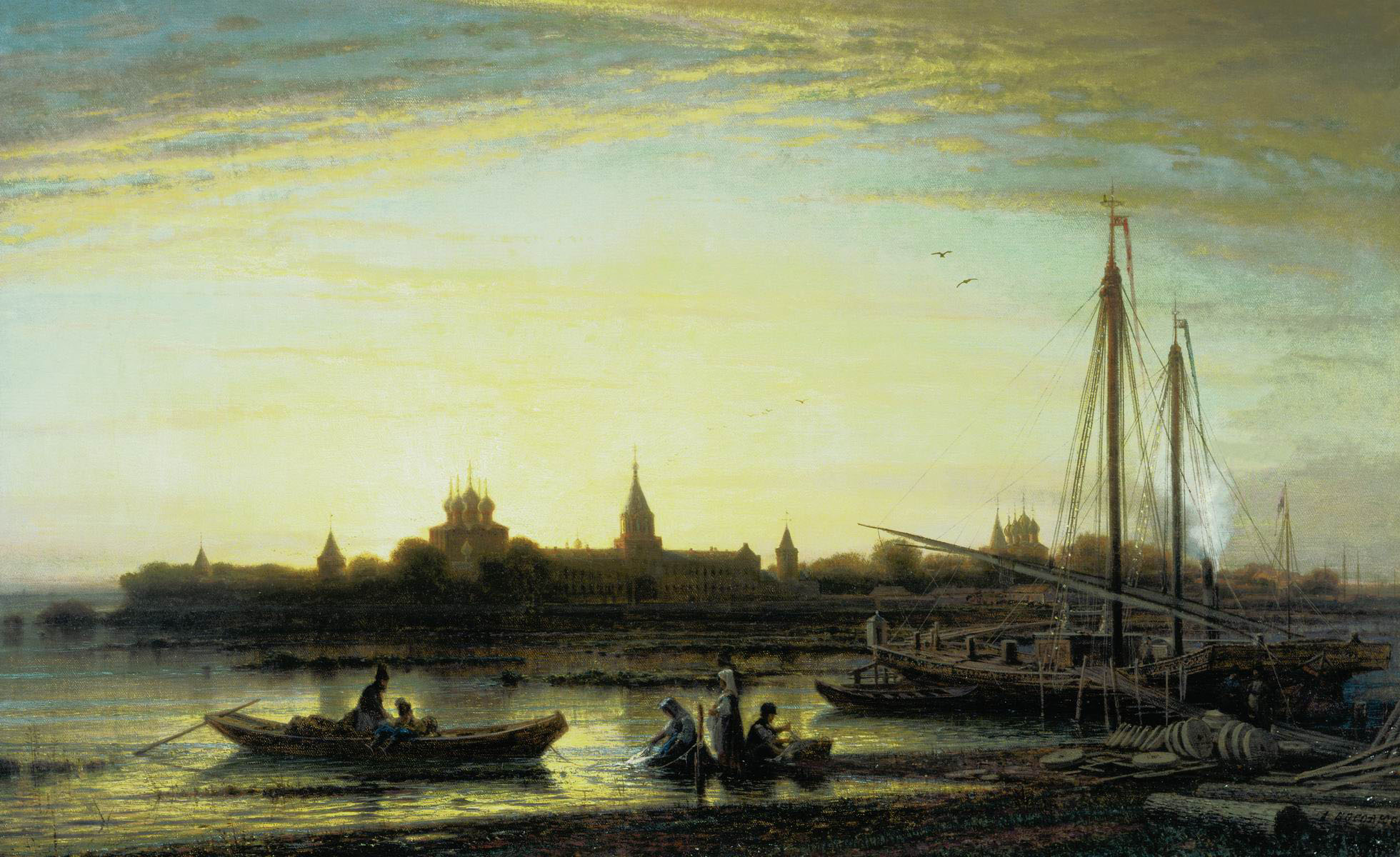
Hypatian Monastery near Kostroma, 1861

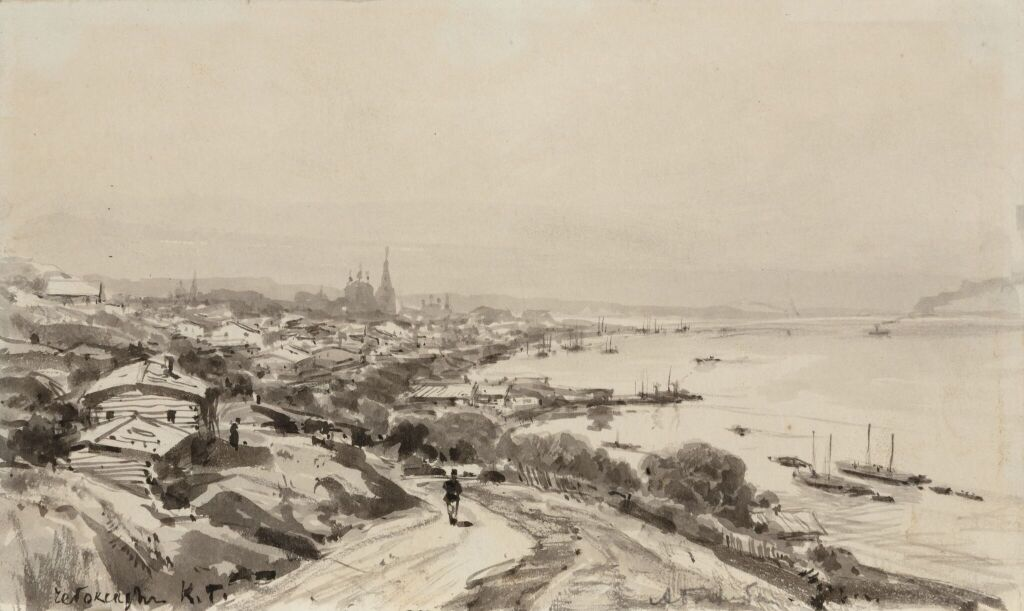
The city of Cheboksary on the Volga (1861)
Tretyakov Gallery

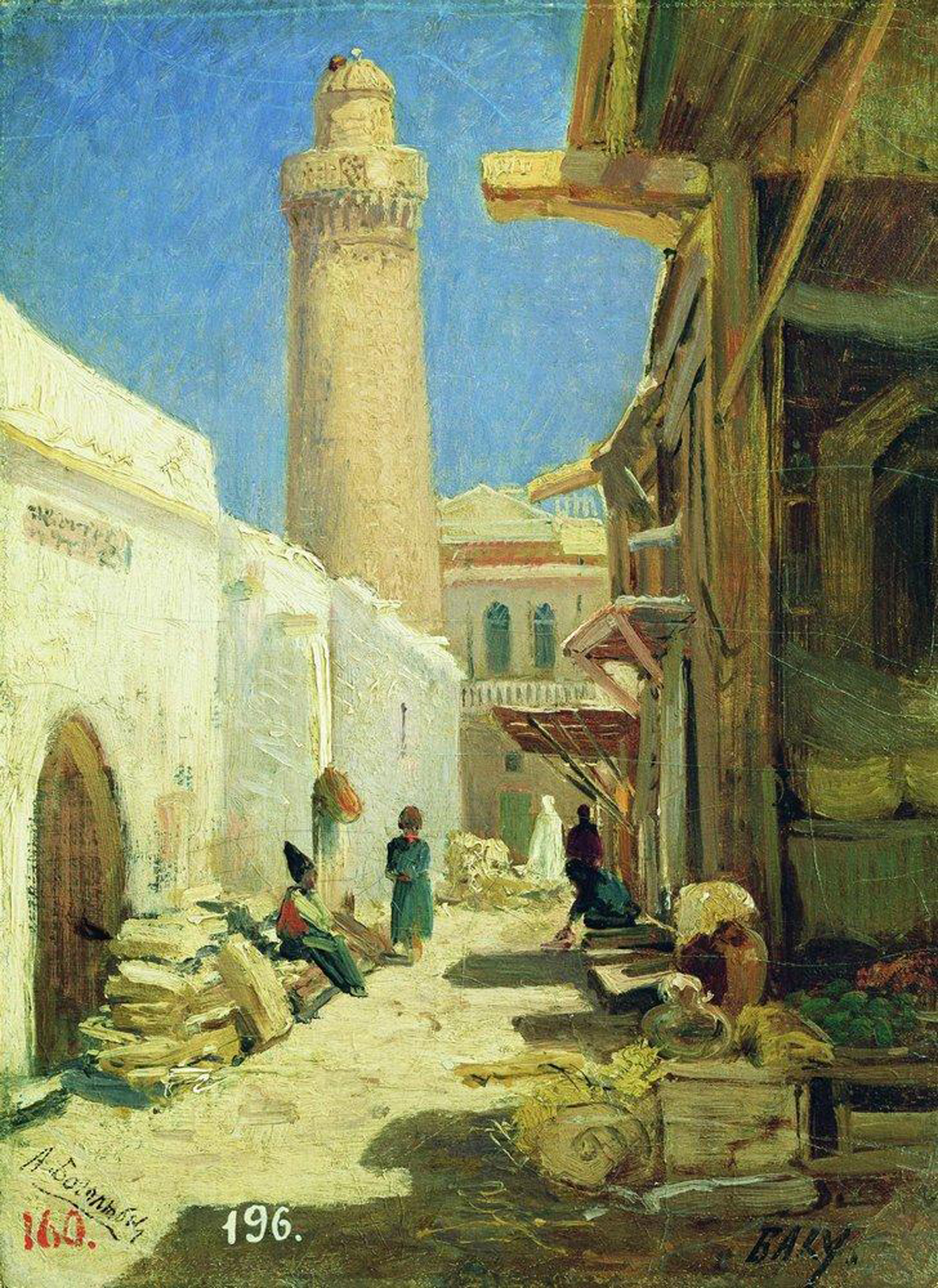
Baku. Street at noon (1861)

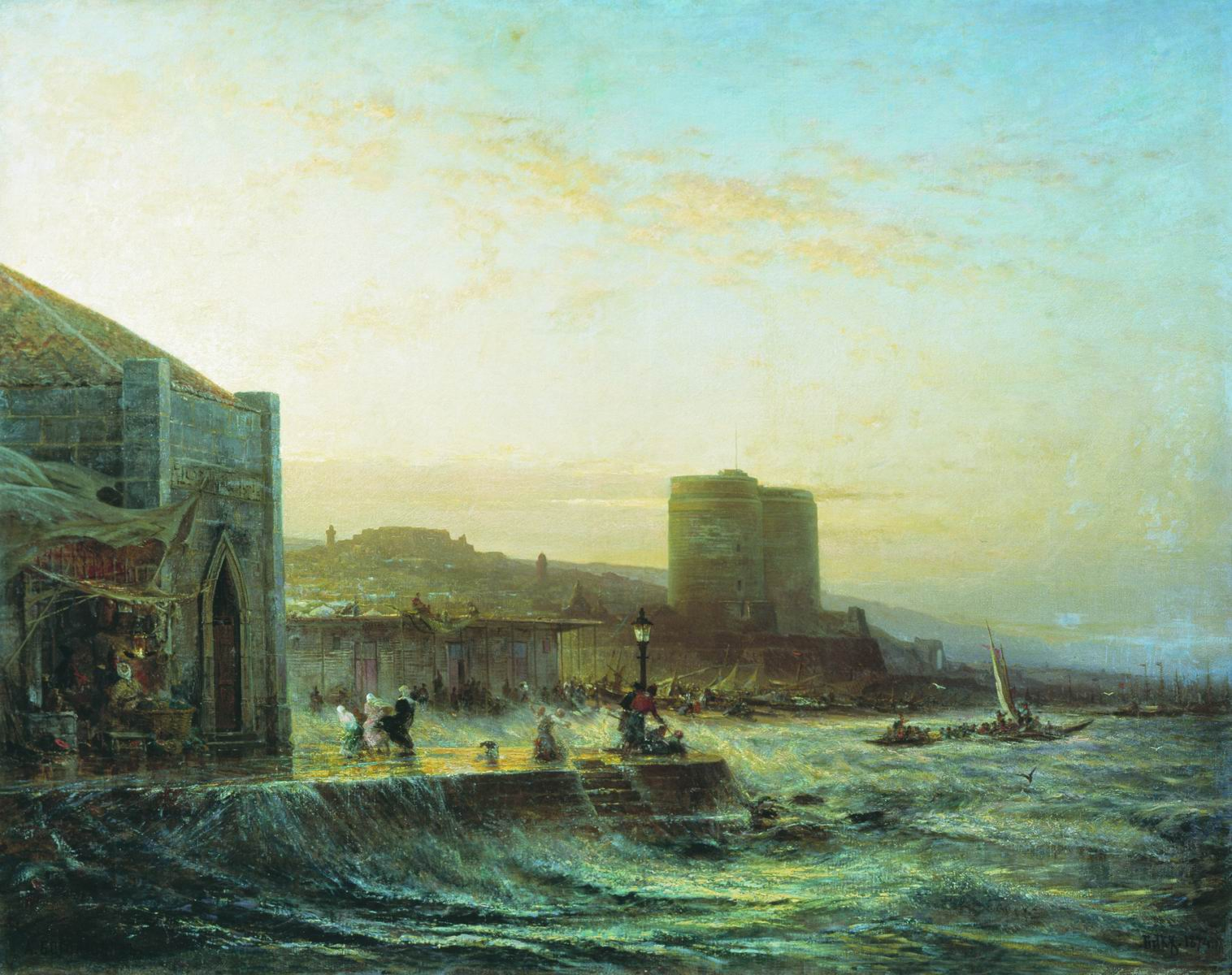
Baku Promenade and its Maiden Tower

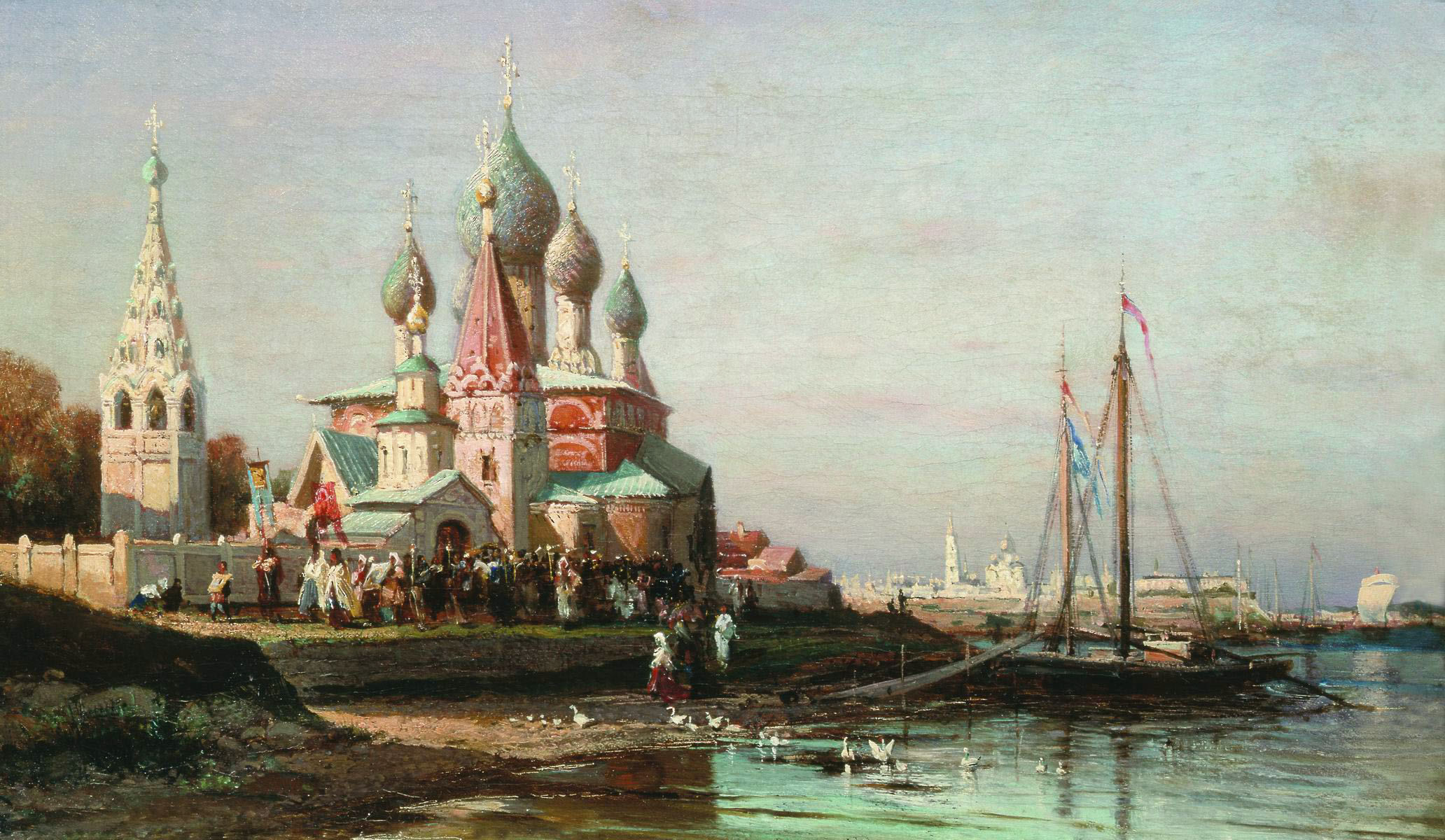
Easter procession in Yaroslavl, 1863

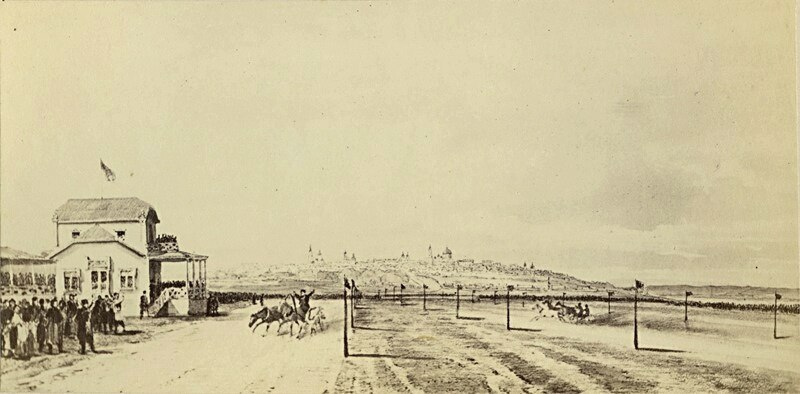
Competitions of troikas at the Simbirsk hippodrome (1863).

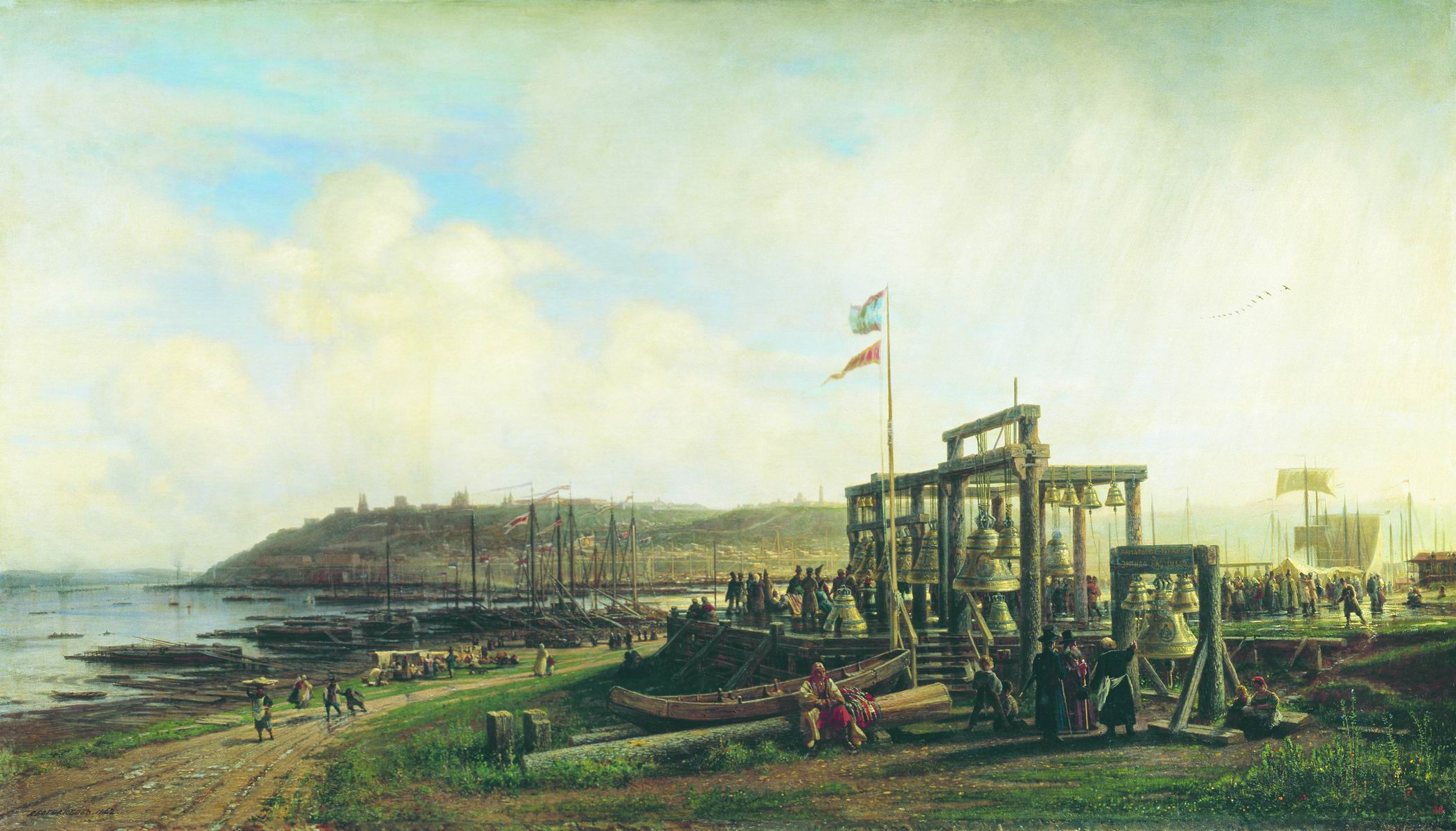
Nizhny Novgorod Fair (bell row). 1862

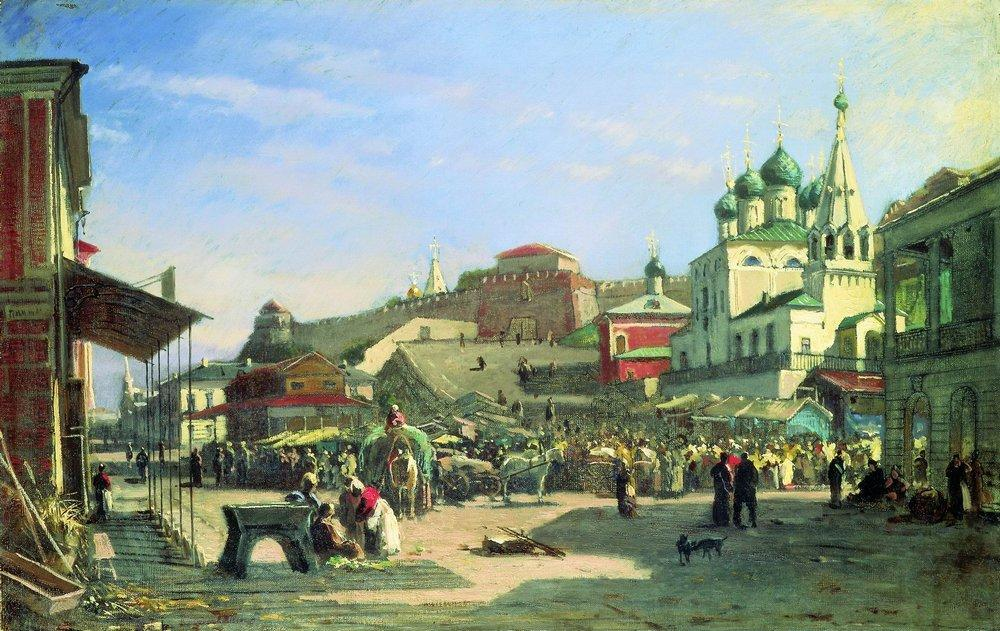
Nizhny Novgorod. Lower Bazaar (1878).

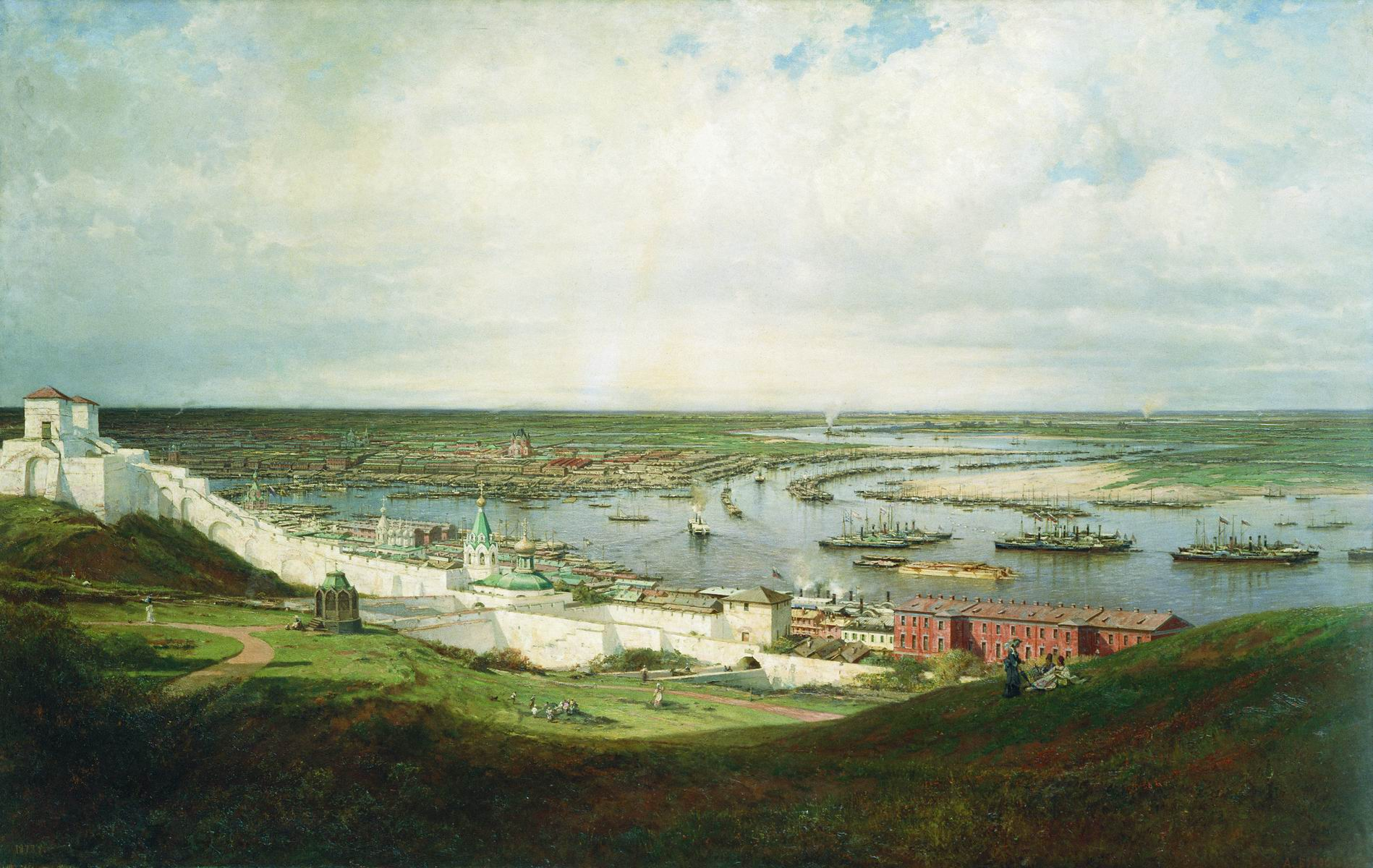
View of Nizhny Novgorod, 1878
The Russian Museum

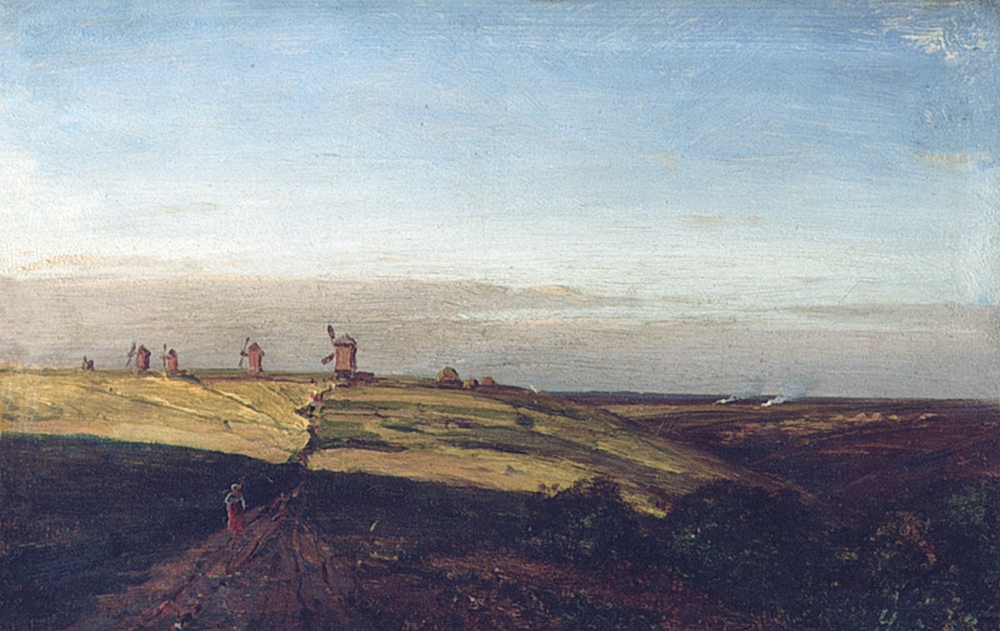
Ablyazovo homestead, stubble and mills, 1860s
Radishchev Art Museum

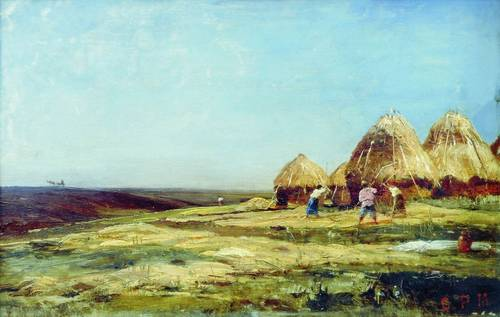
Ablyazovo. Threshing, 1887

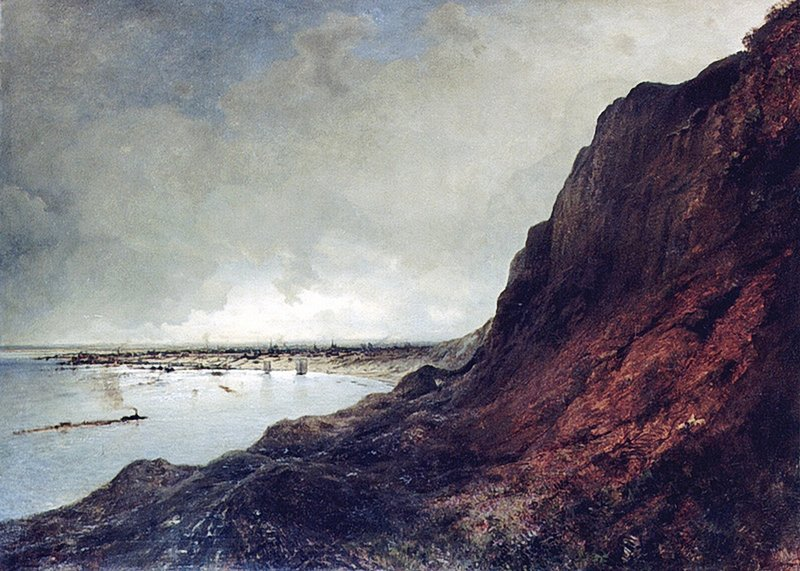
A View of Saratov, between 1887 and 1888
Radishchev Art Museum

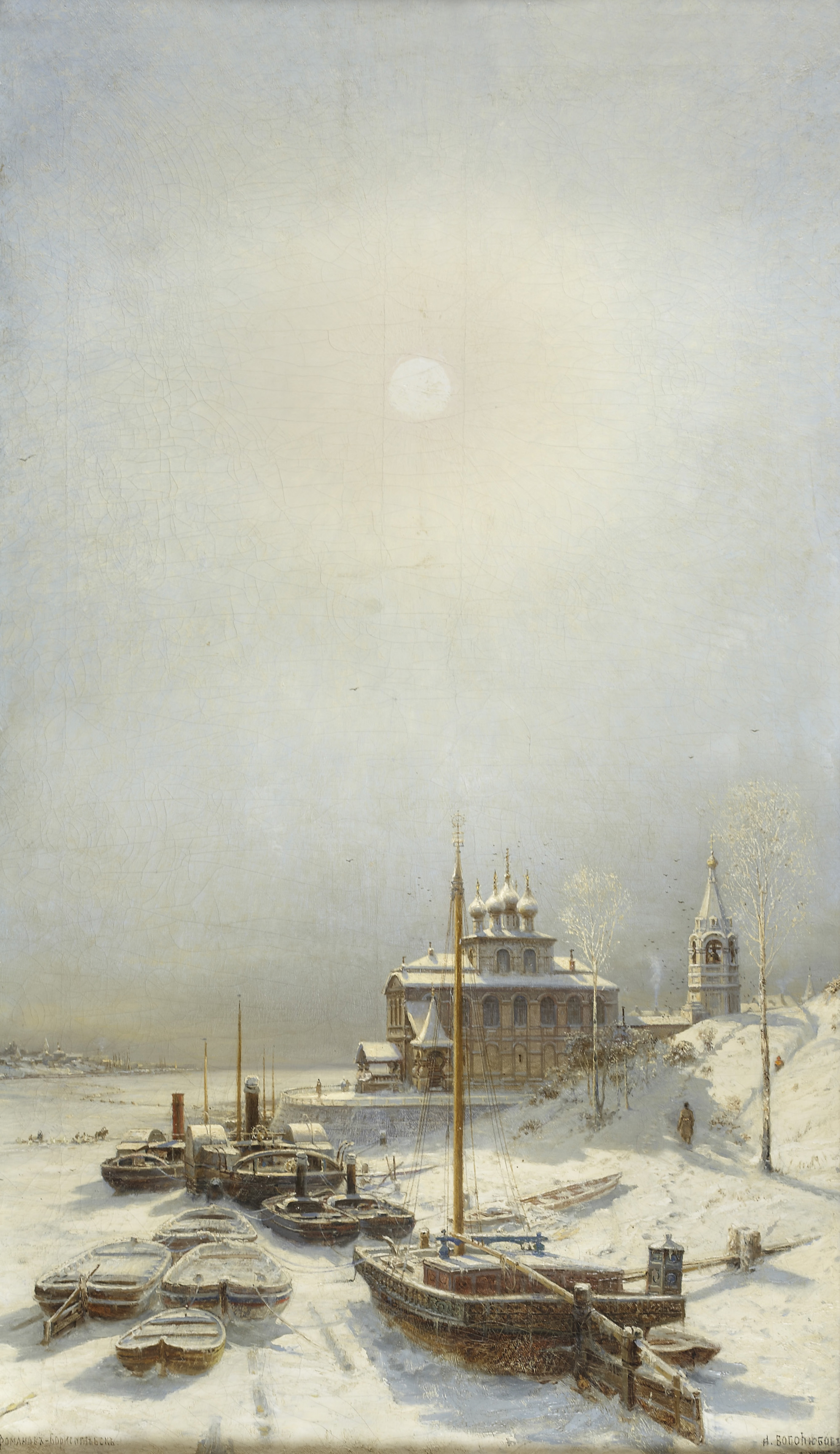
Winter in Borisoglebsk before 1902
Yekaterinburg Museum of Fine Arts

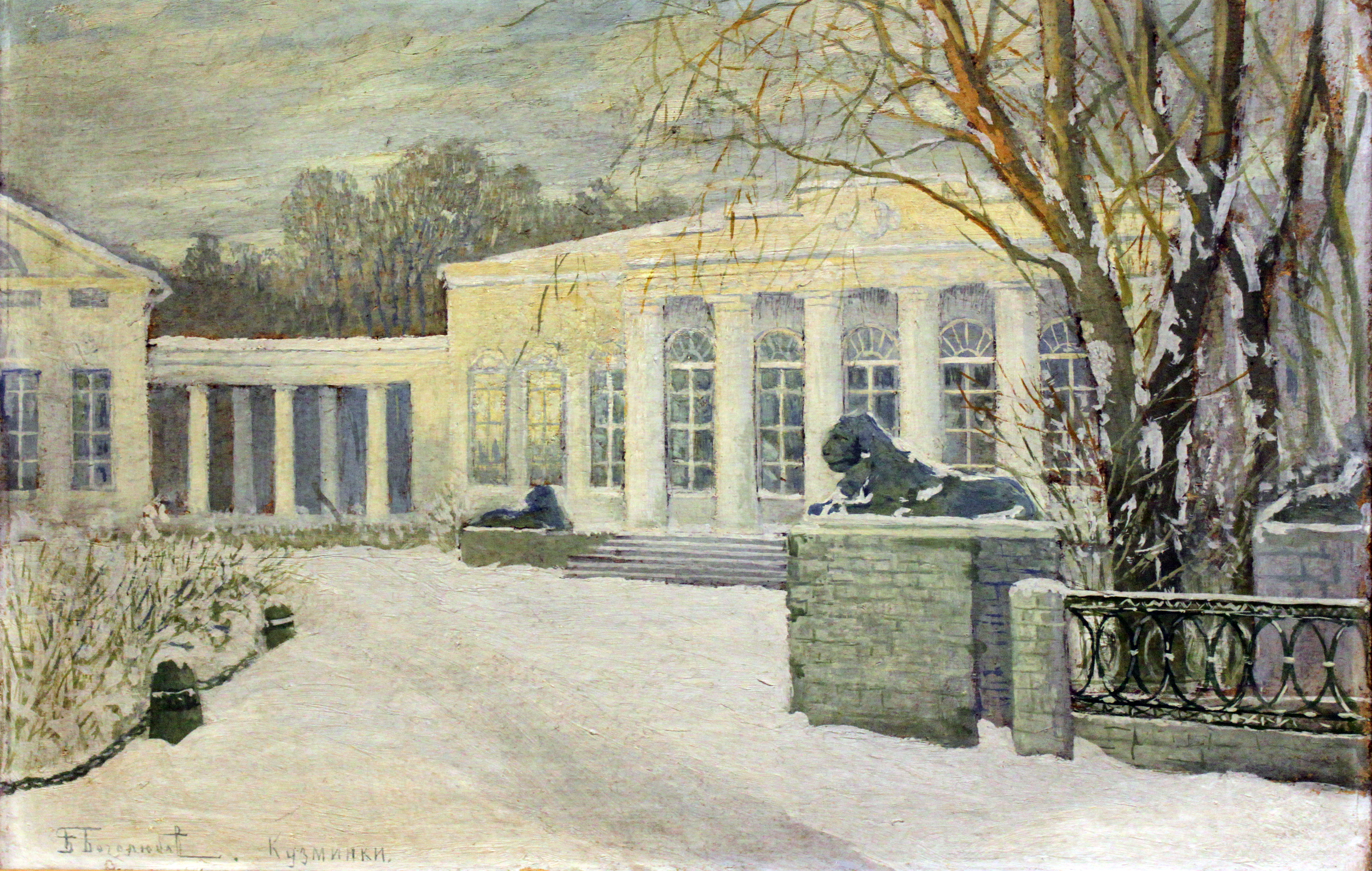
Kuzminki (estate of Prince Golitsyn), 1903
Yekaterinburg Museum of Fine Arts

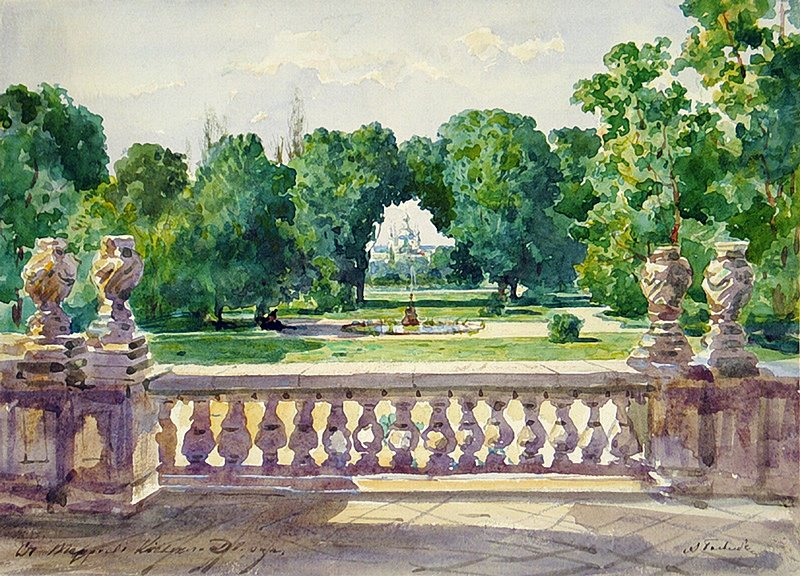
Kiev. The Palace Garden
Radishchev Art Museum

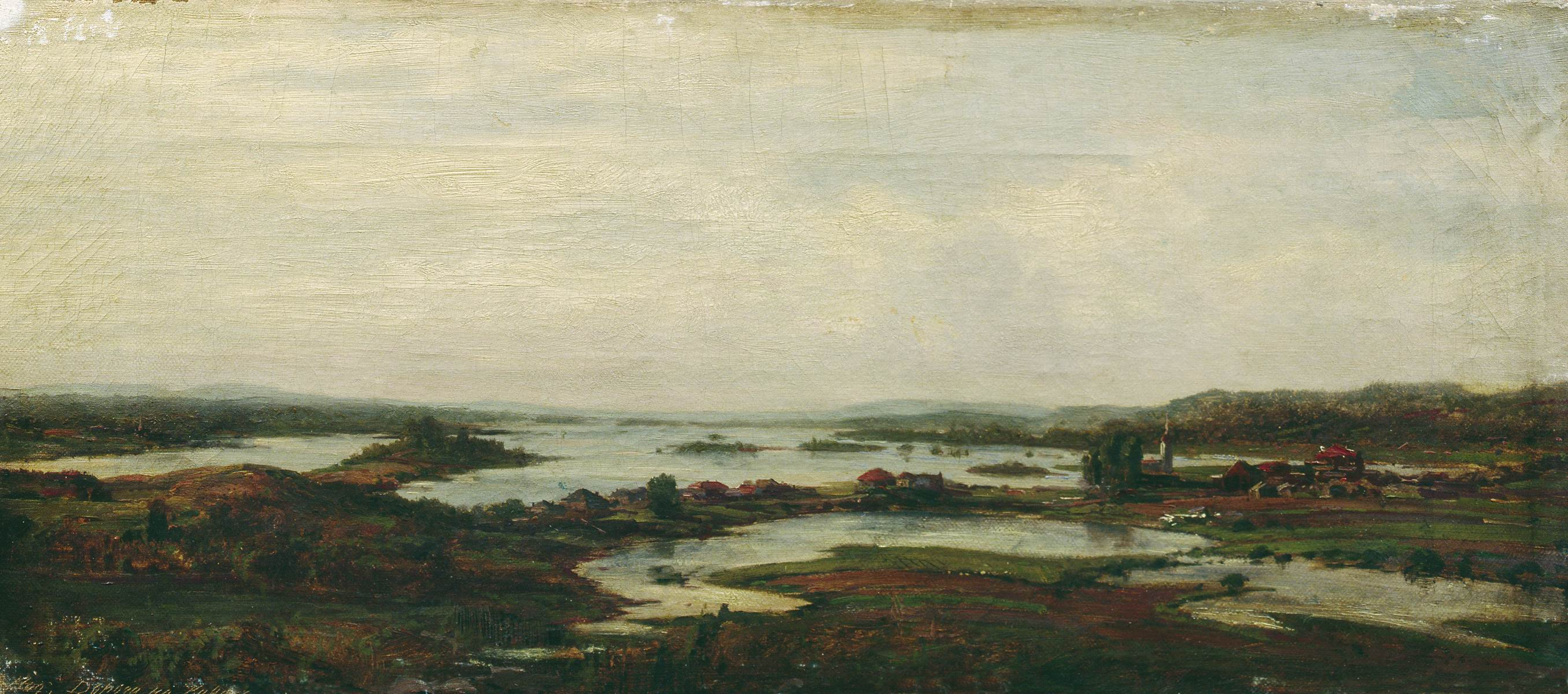
Konchozero
Art Museum of Georgia

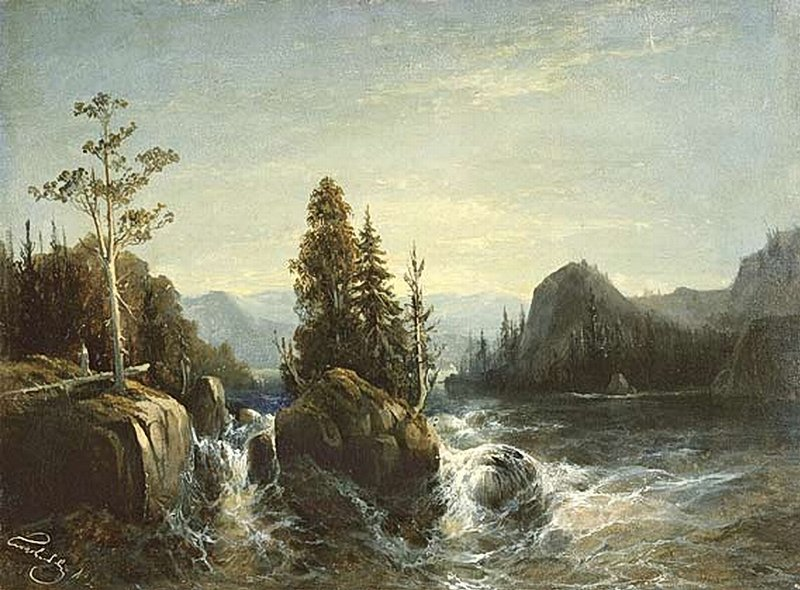
Finland
Radishchev Art Museum

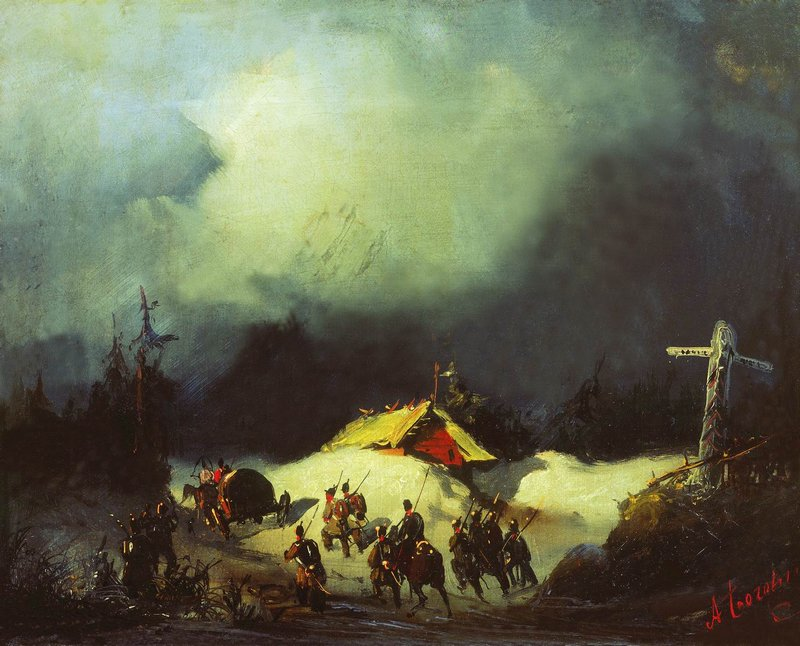
The Decembrists' exile to Finland, 1854
Radishchev Art Museum

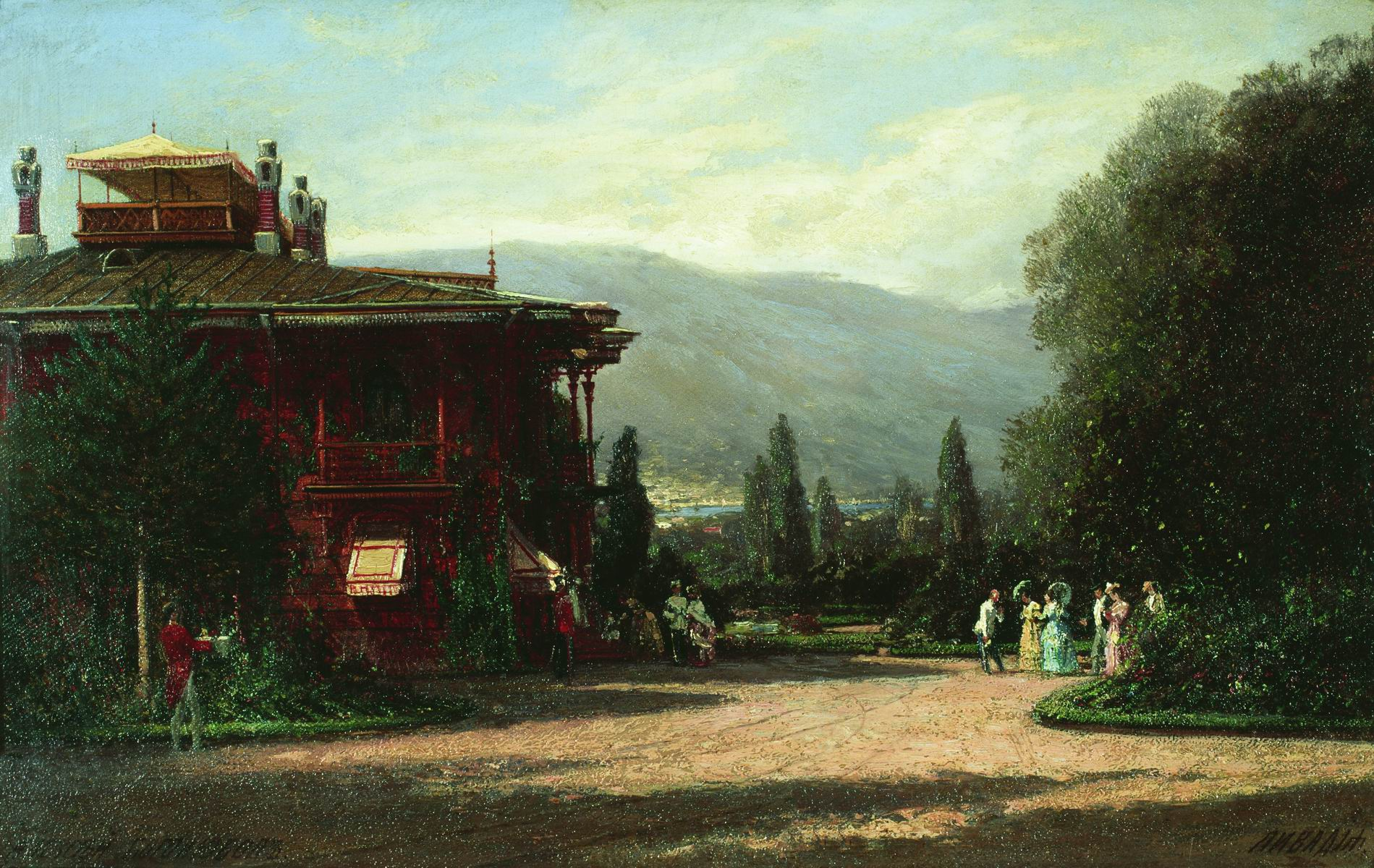
Livadia Palace
France

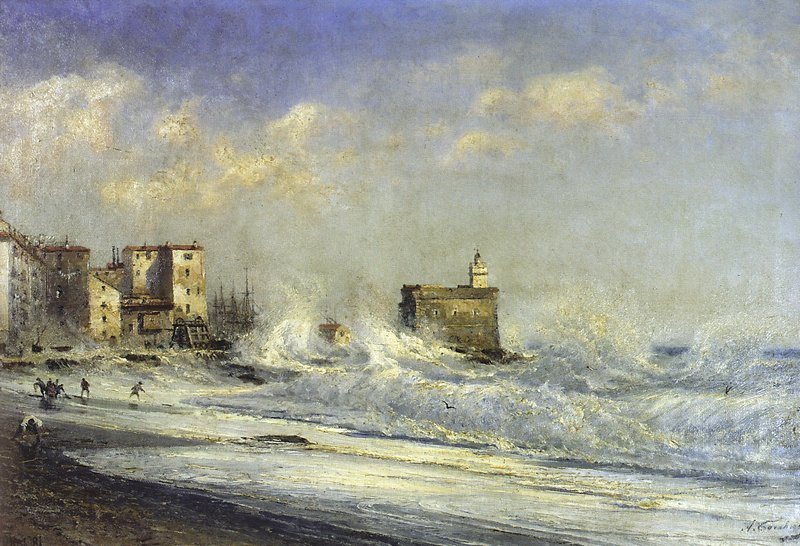
Storm in Menton, 1851
Radishchev Art Museum

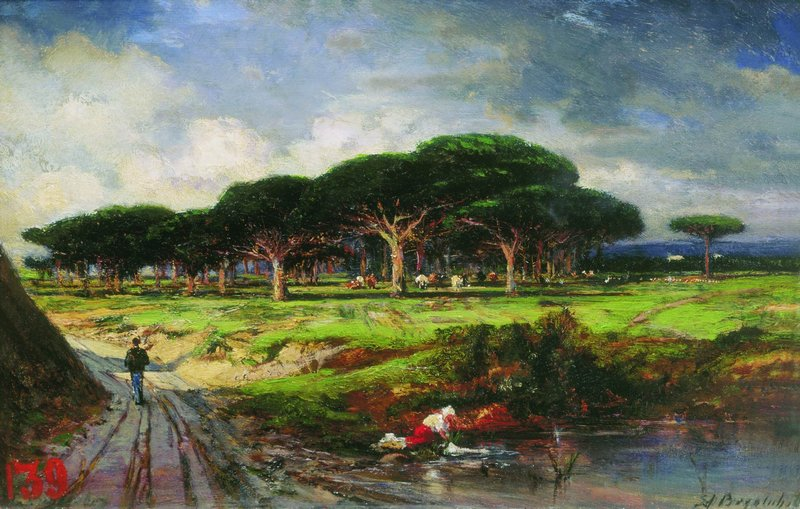
Pine Forest near Menton, 1881
Radishchev Art Museum

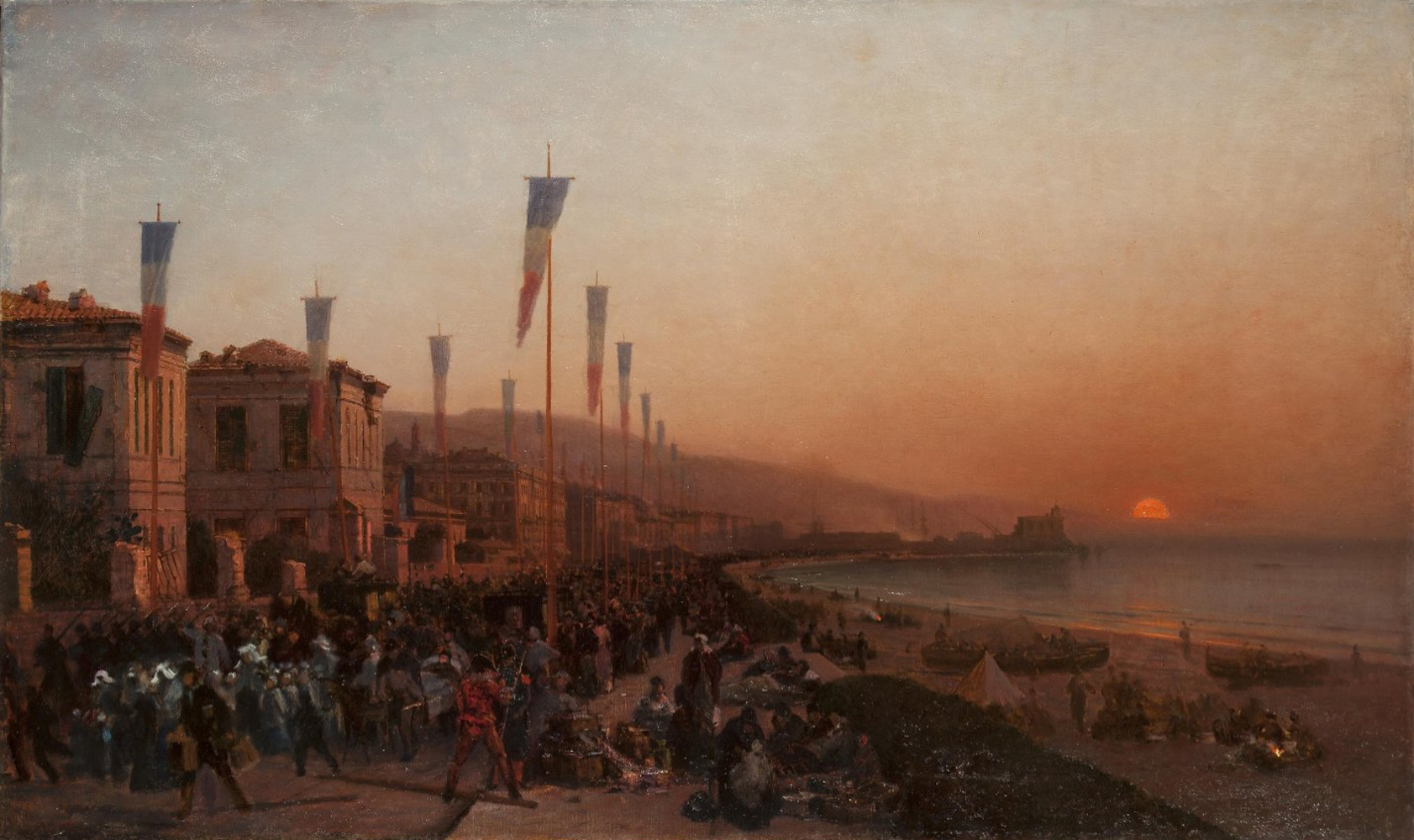
Earthquake in Menton on Carnival night, 23 February 1887 (1887)
The Russian Museum

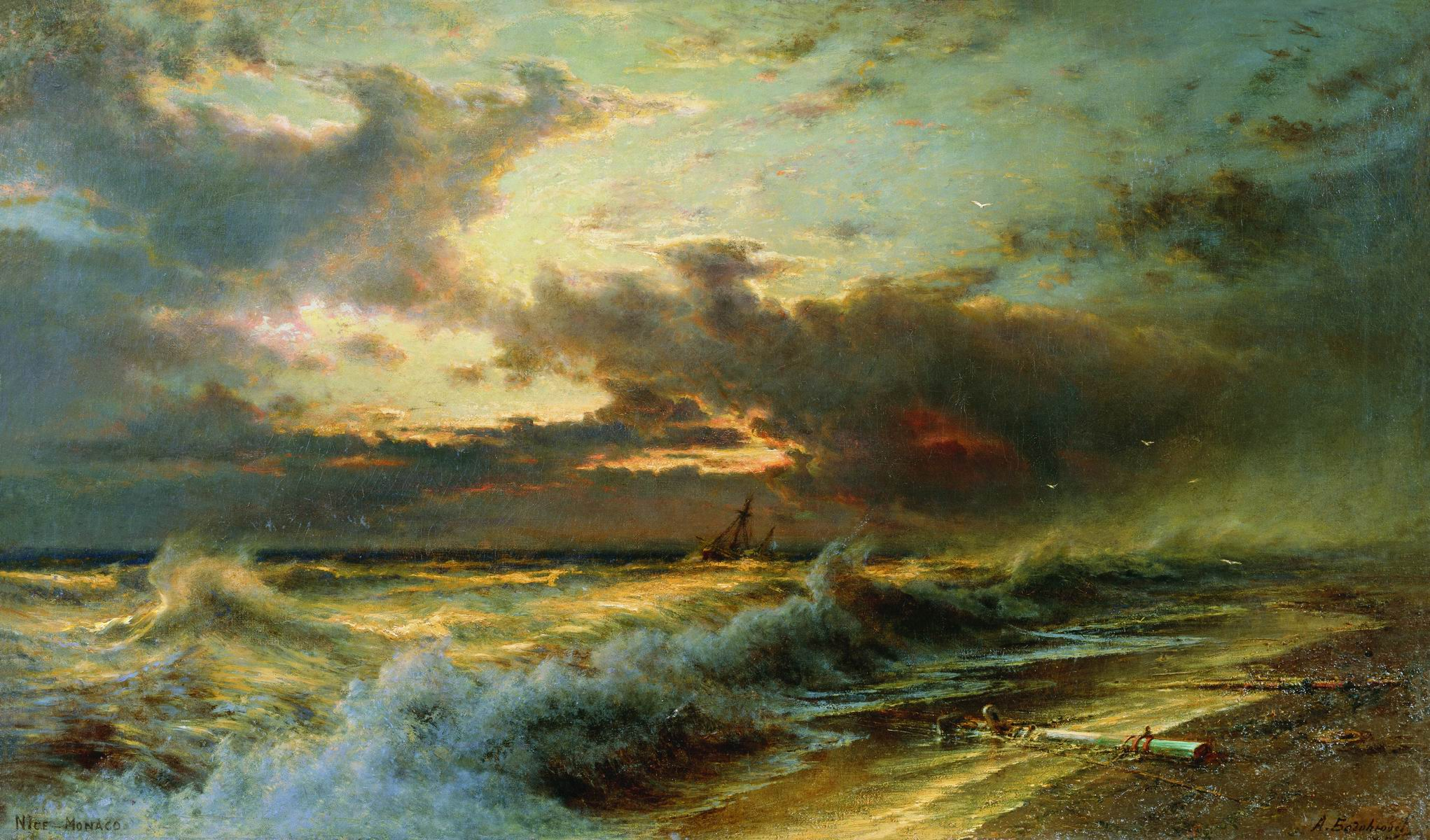
The surf in Menton, 1880s
Central Naval Museum

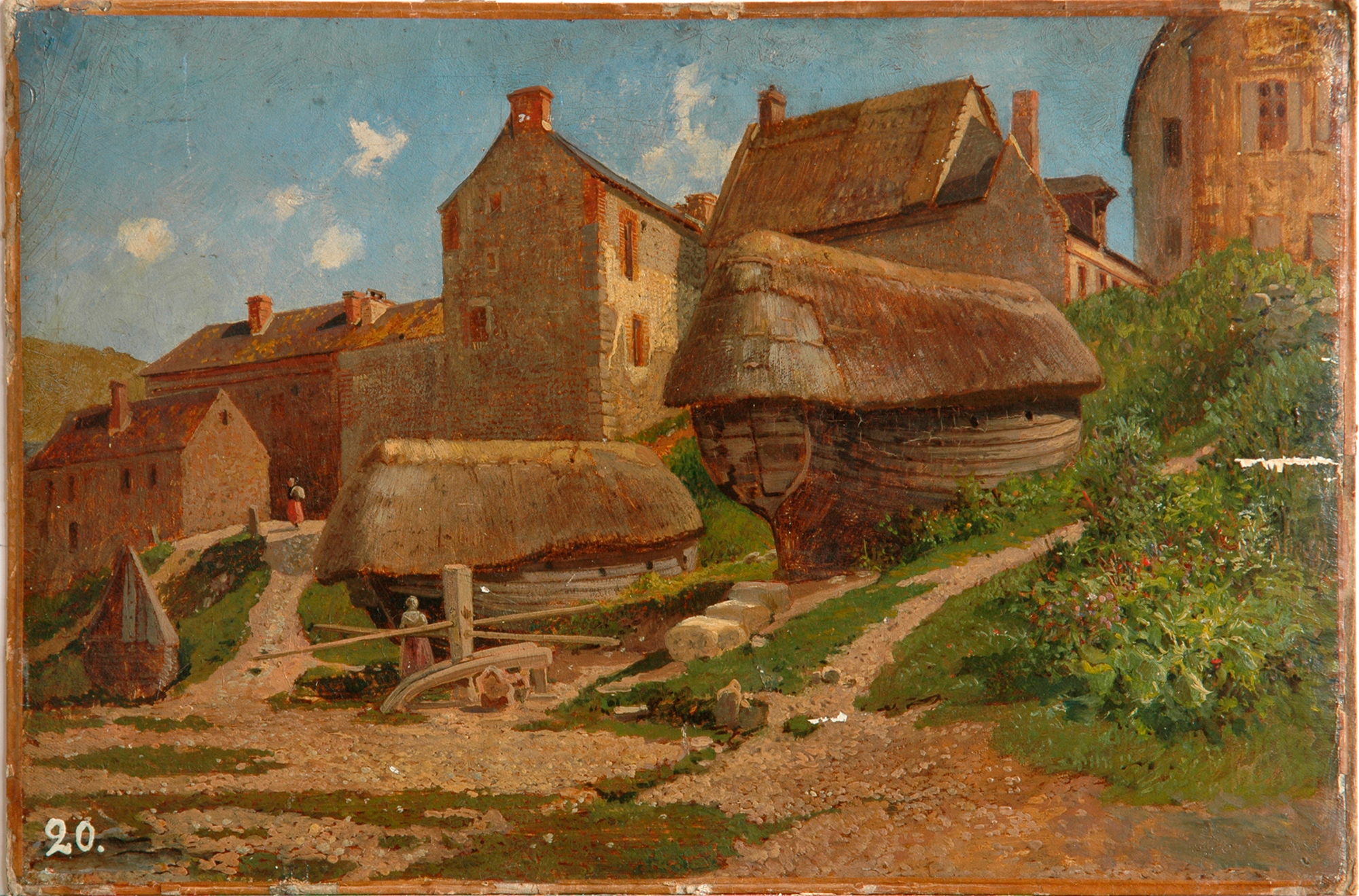
Yport. Fisherman's dwellings. 1858

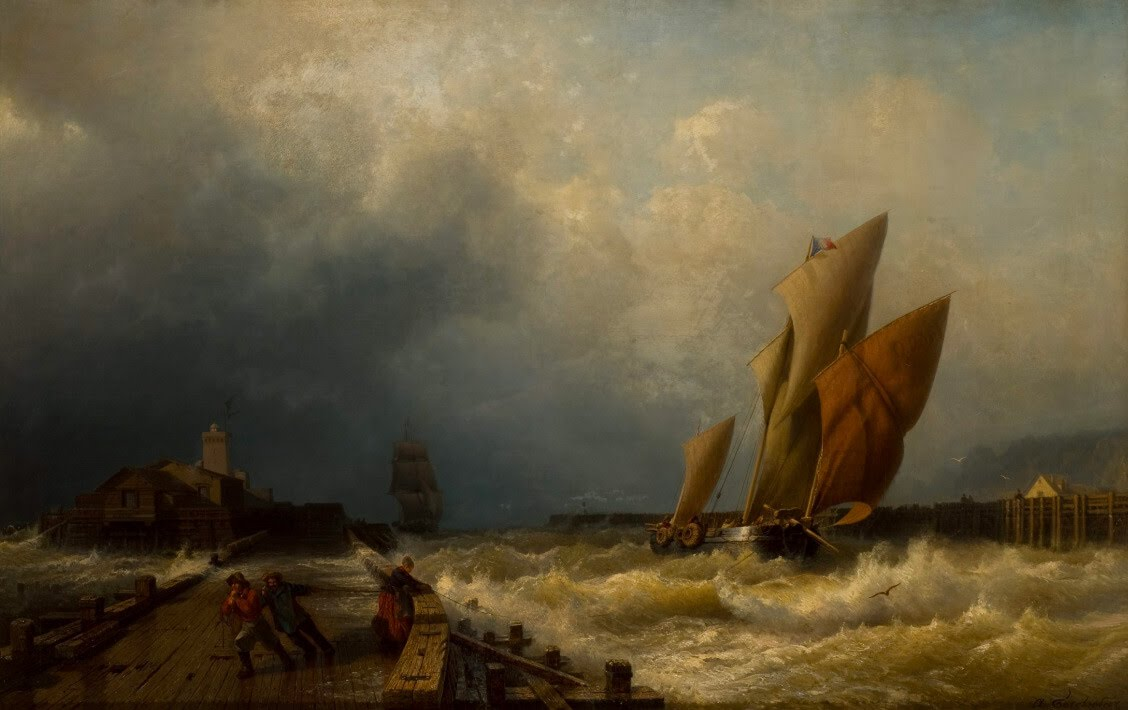
Fishing Vessel Entering Saint-Valery Harbor in Caux during a Storm c. 1859
The Russian Museum

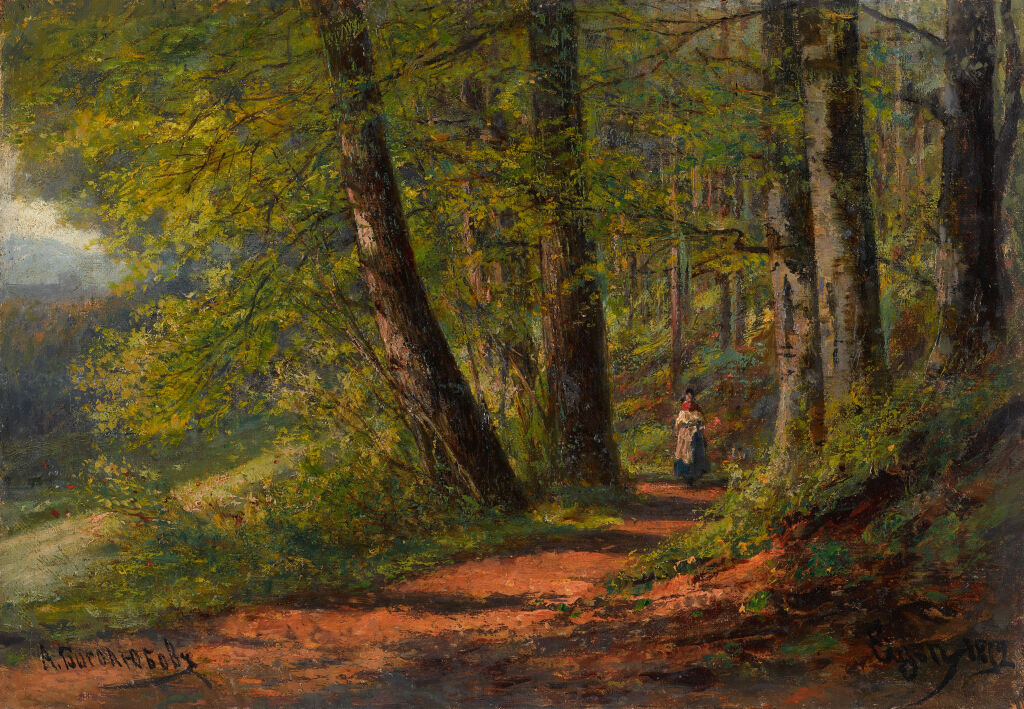
In the park (Forest of Fontainebleau, 1872)
Tretyakov Gallery

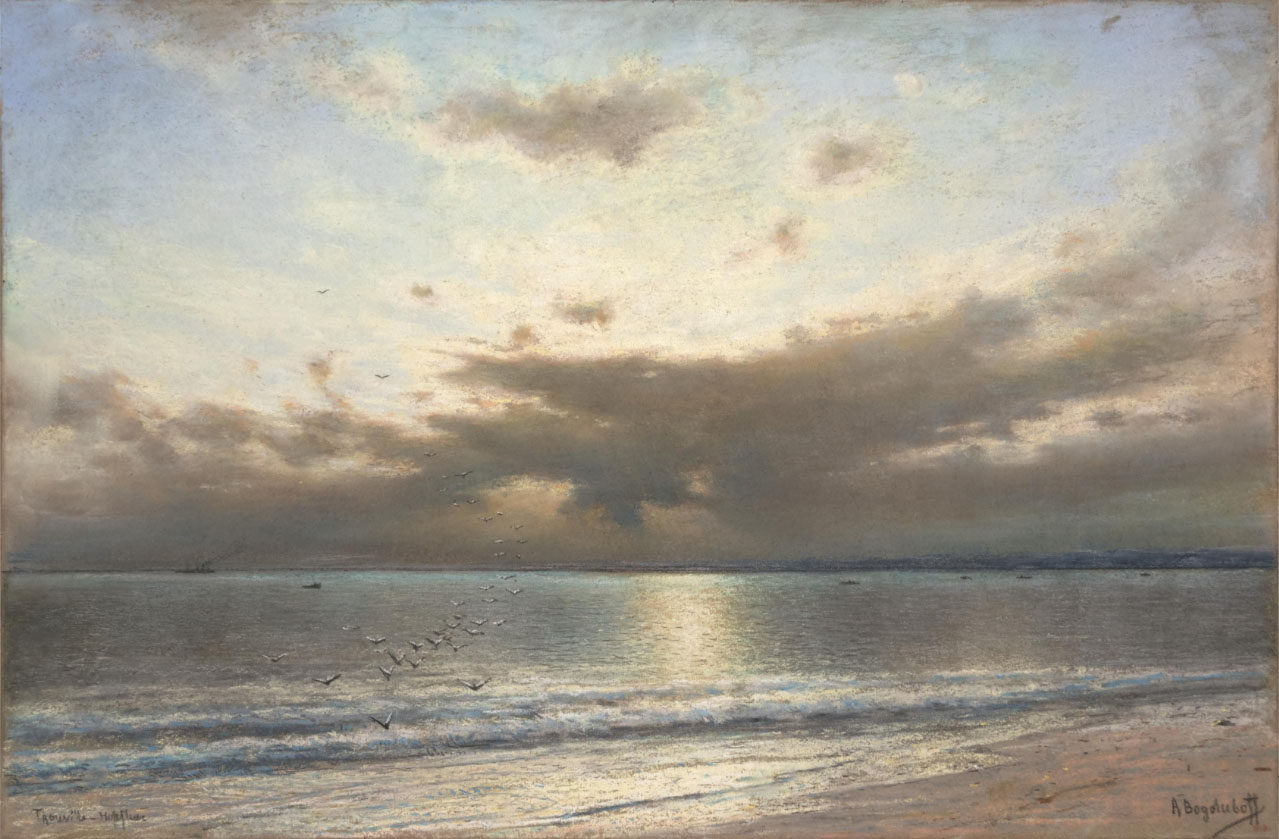
Honfleur. Sunset on the sea. 1870s
The Russian Museum

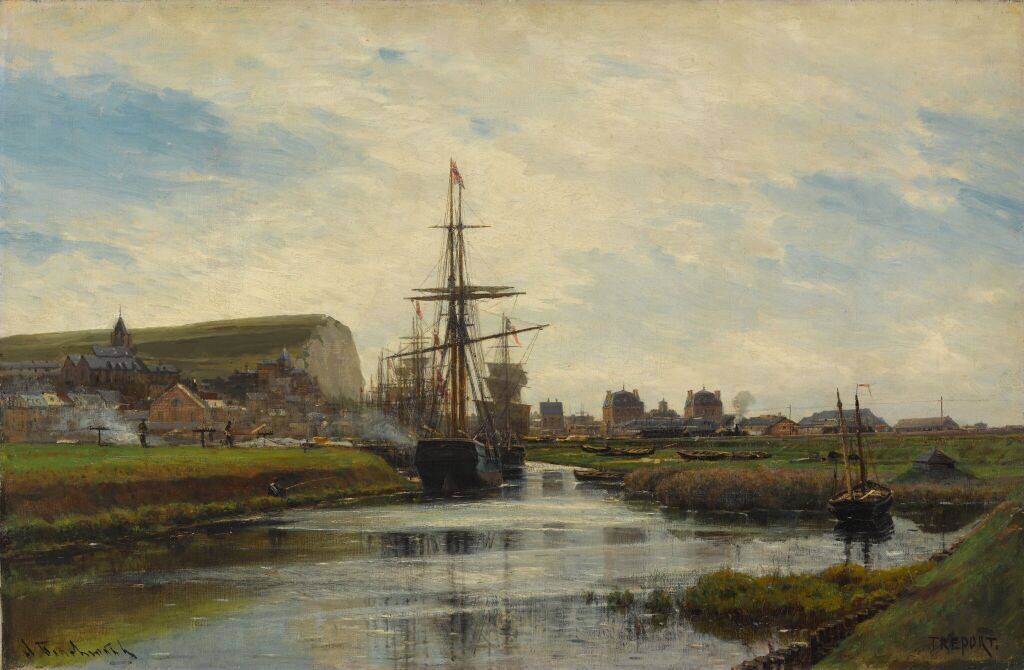
Le Tréport, Normandy, French Republic. The 2nd half of the 1870s
Tretyakov Gallery

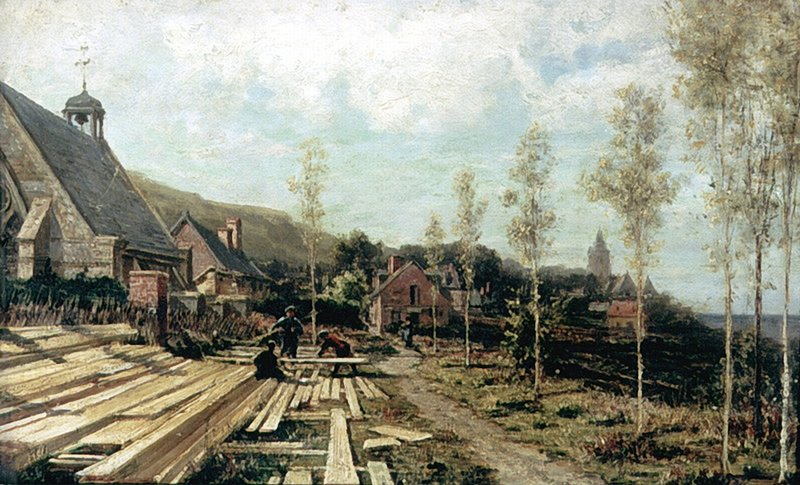
Le Tréport (1883)
Radishchev Art Museum

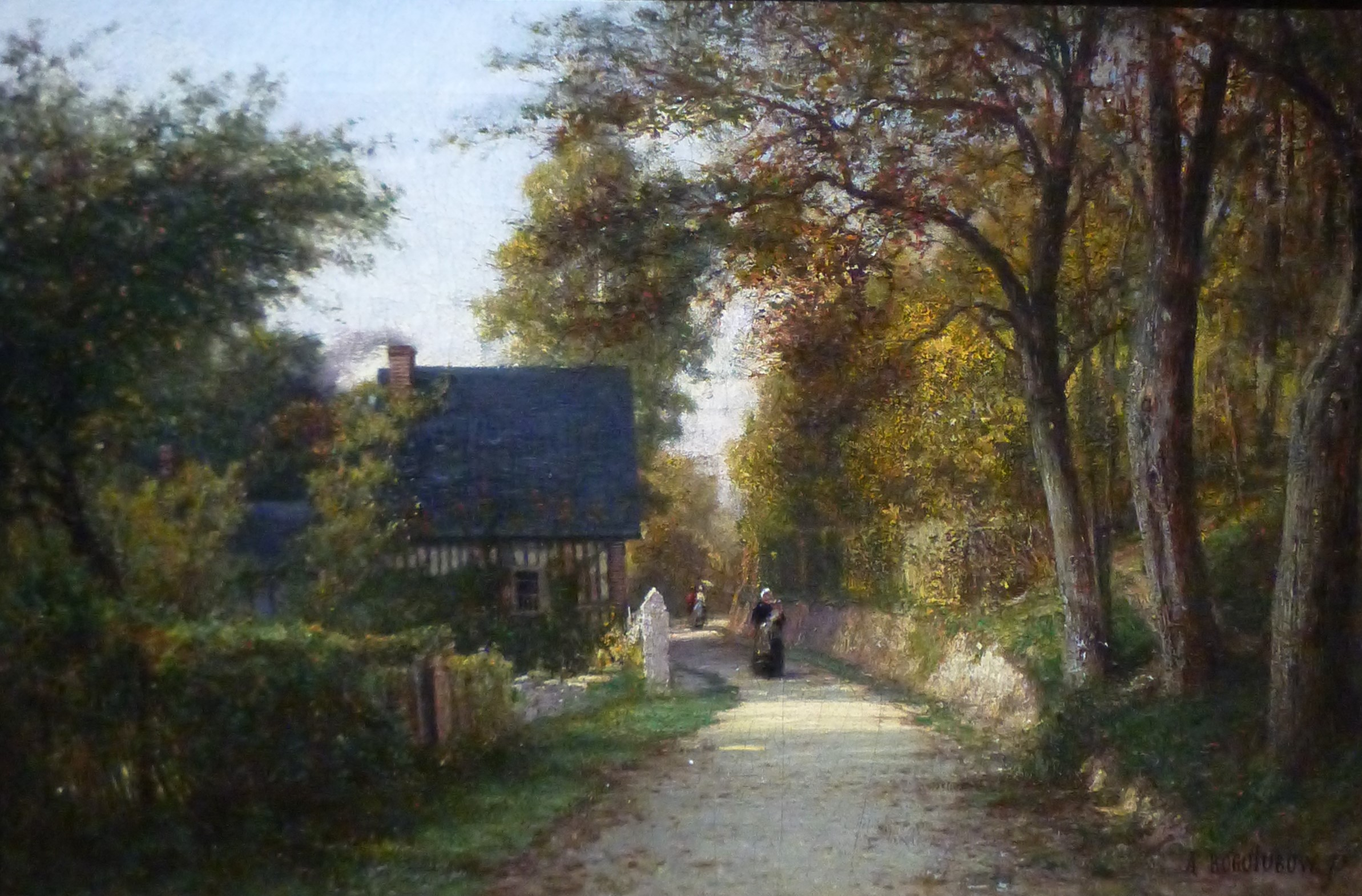
Normandy, 1870.
Yekaterinburg Museum of Fine Arts

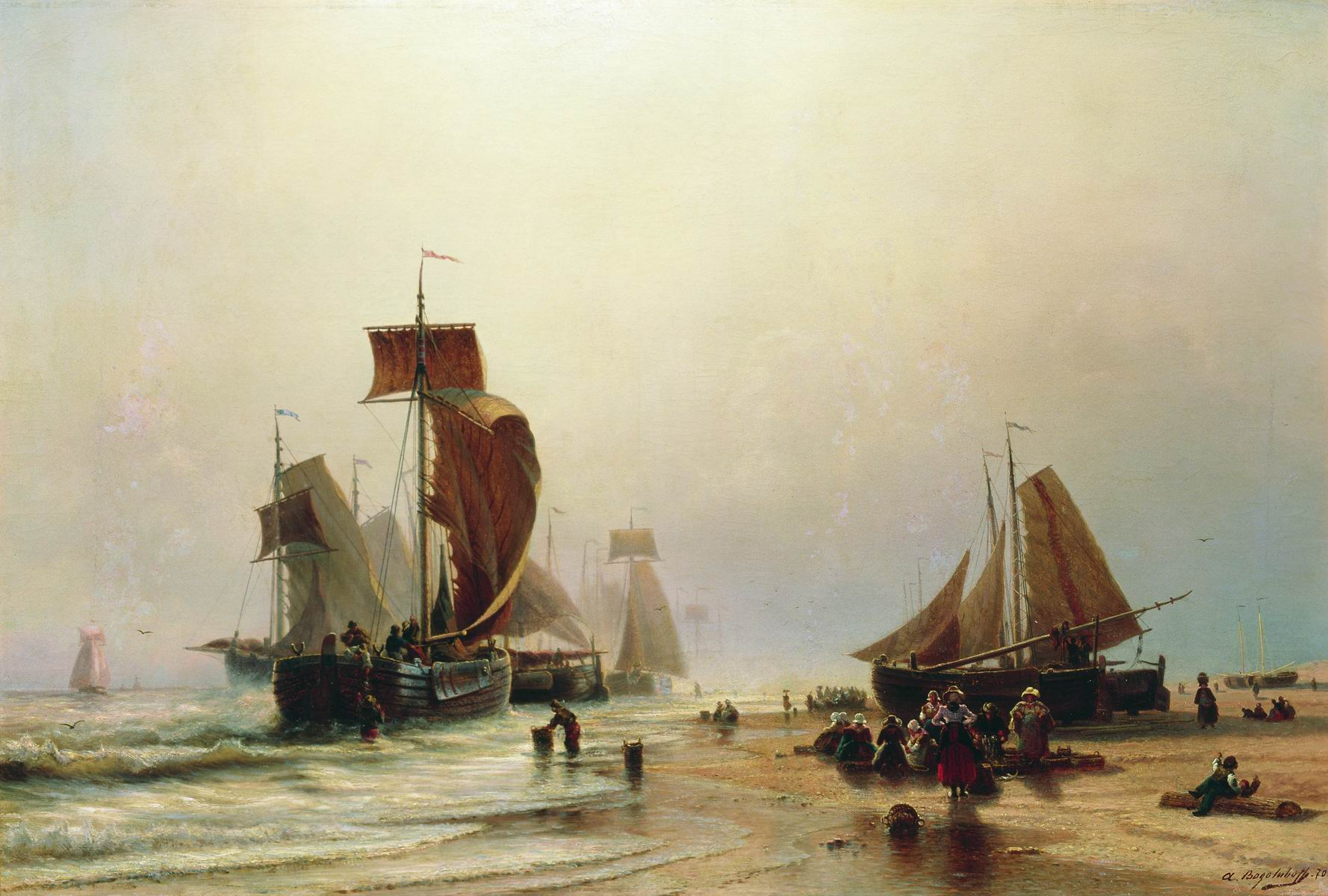
A 1870 view in Normandy

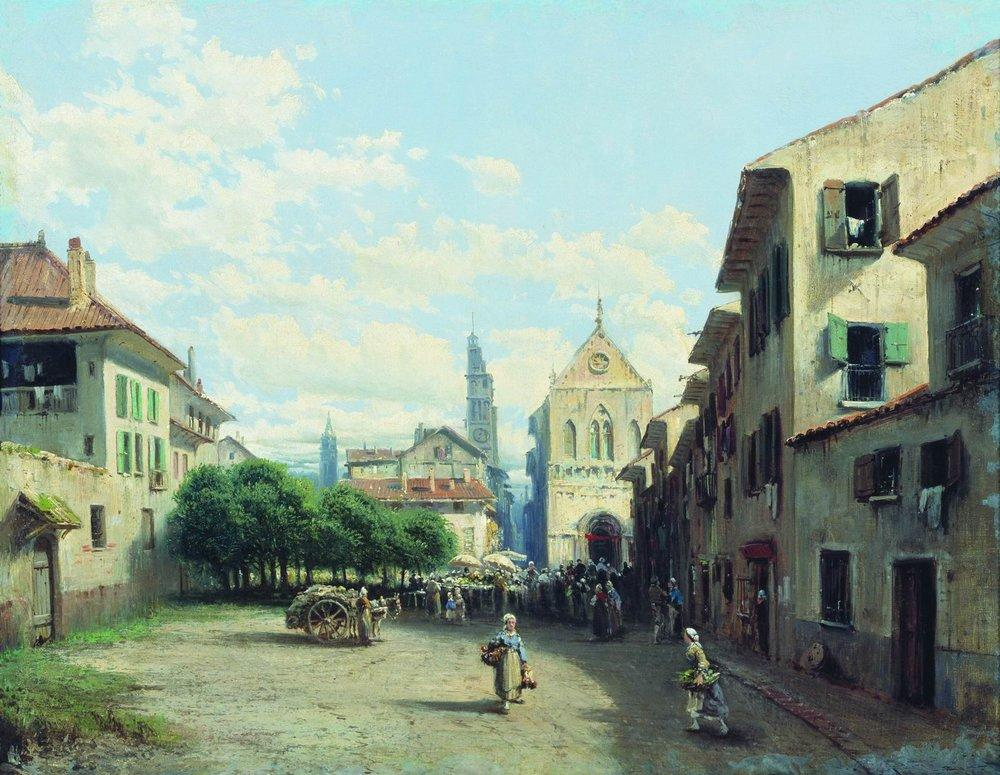
Normandy town, 1879

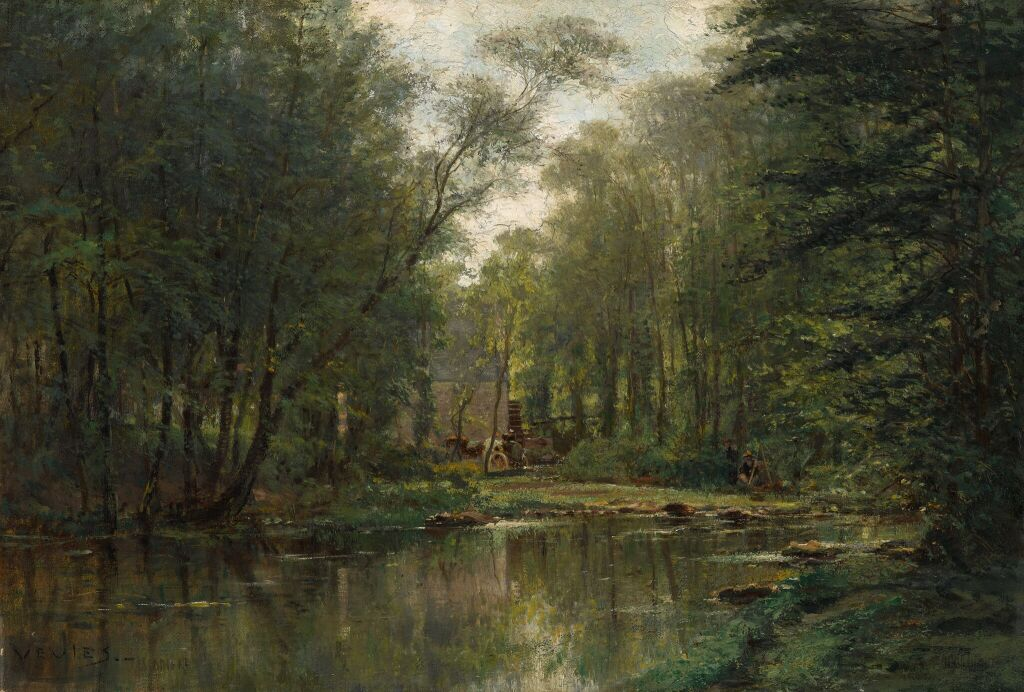
Forest in Veules-les-Roses. Normandy. (1871)
Tretyakov Gallery

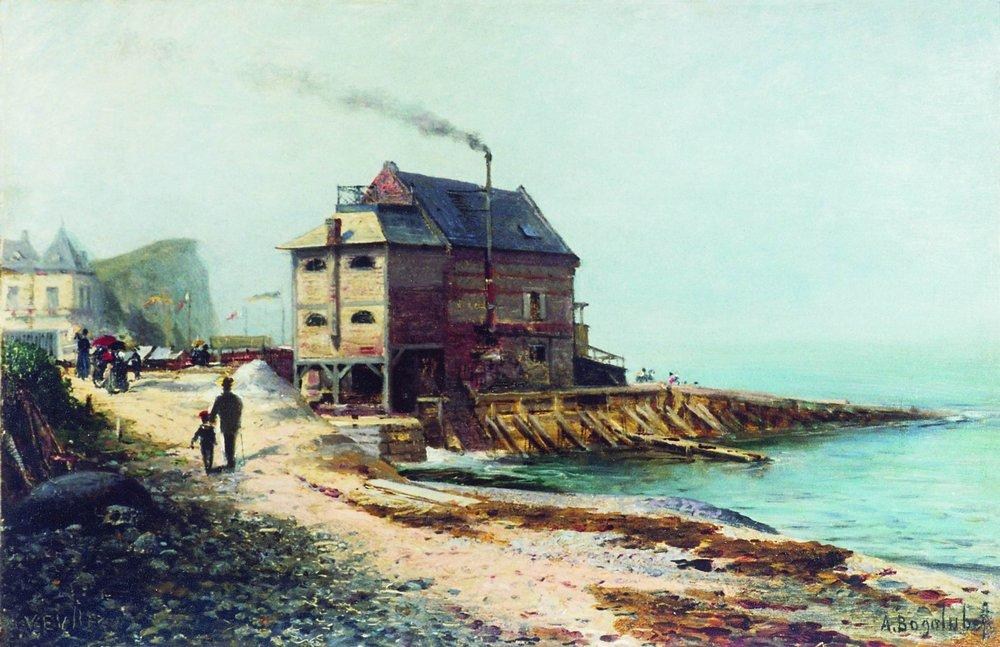
Veules-les-Roses, Normandy, 1880

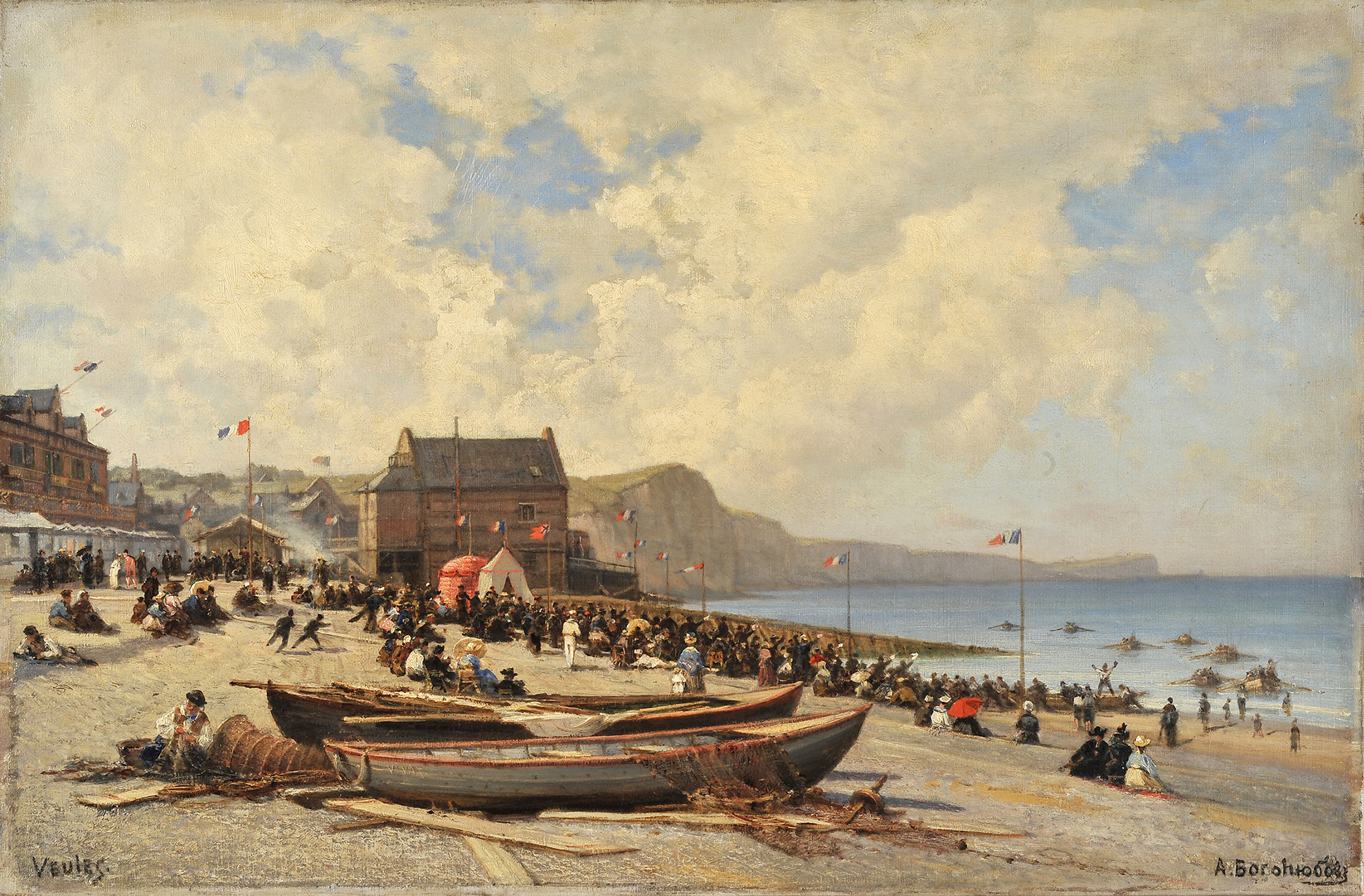
Embankment in Veules-les-Roses
The Russian Museum

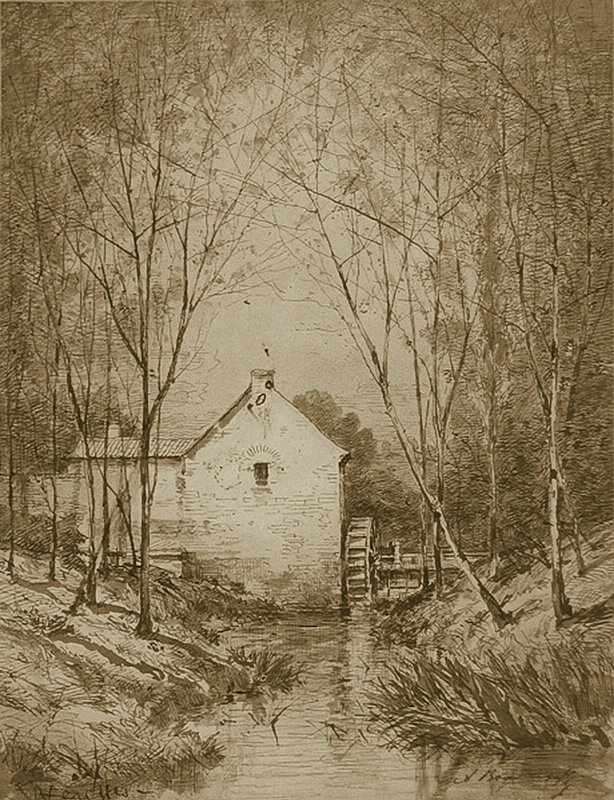
The Watermill in Veules-les-Roses
Radishchev Art Museum

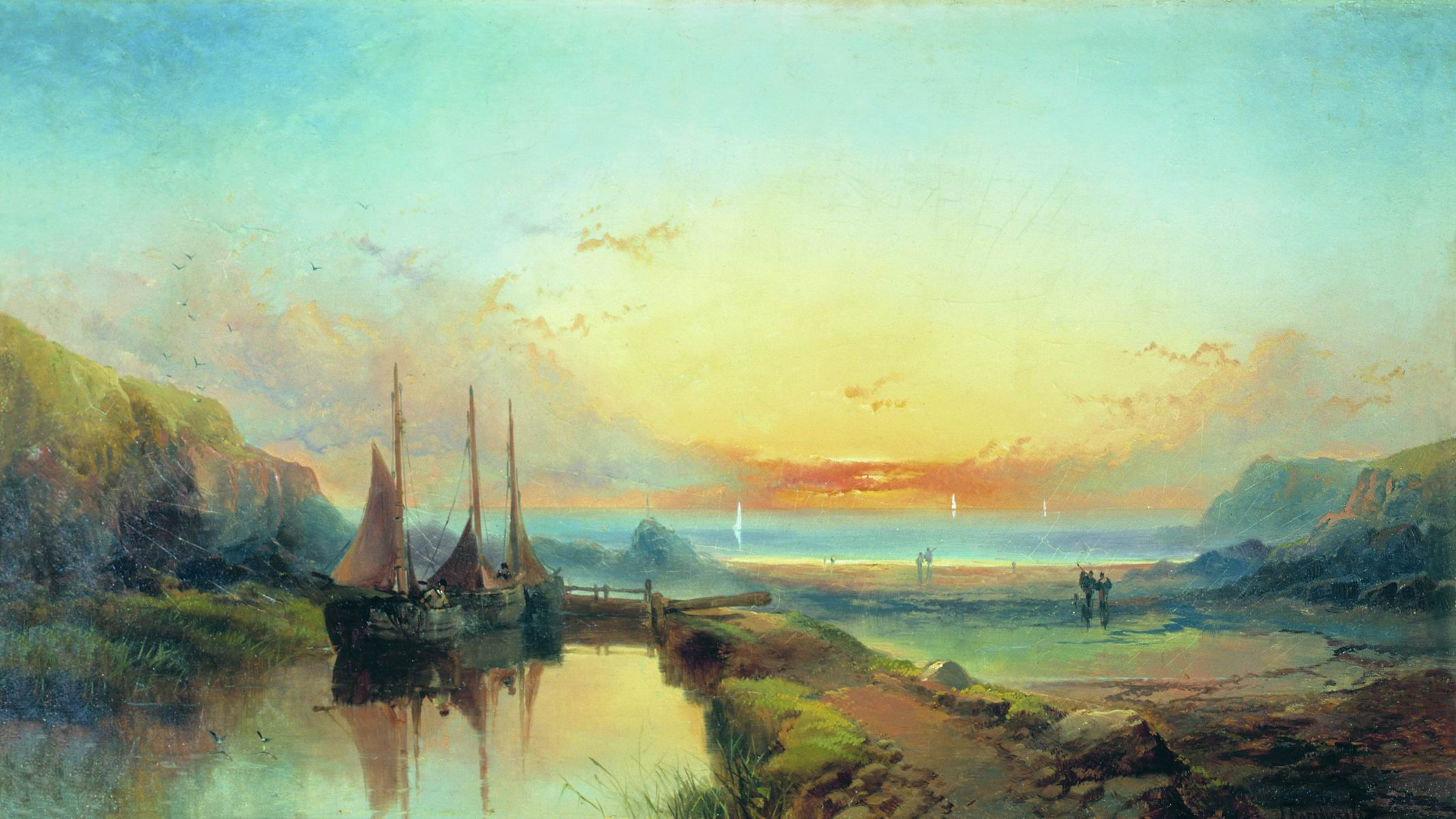
Île Saint-Marcouf near North Normandy

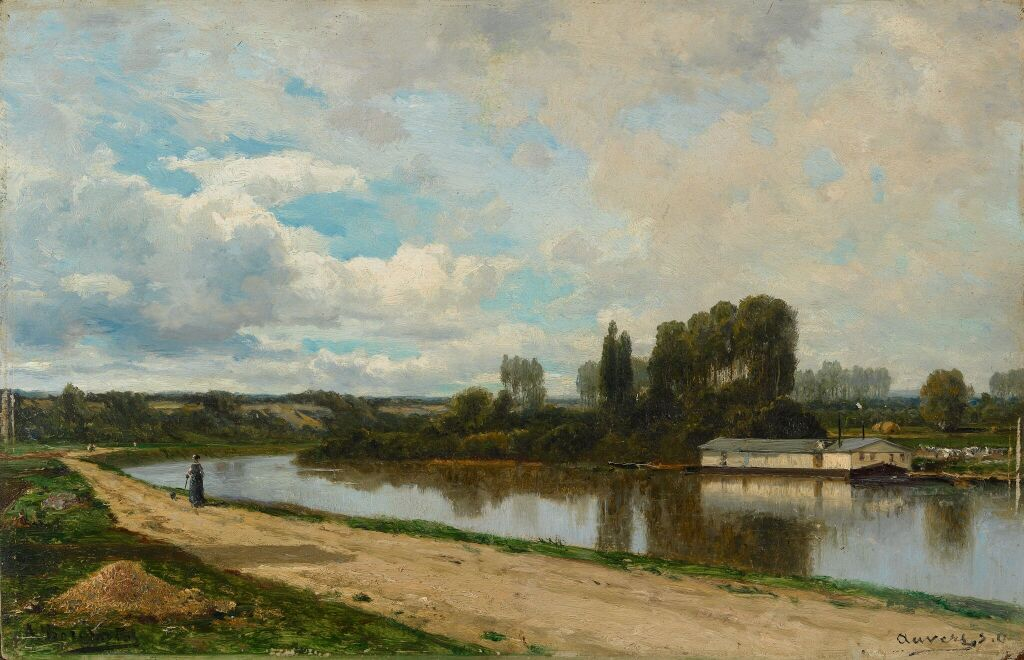
Auvers-sur-Oise, 1881
Tretyakov Gallery

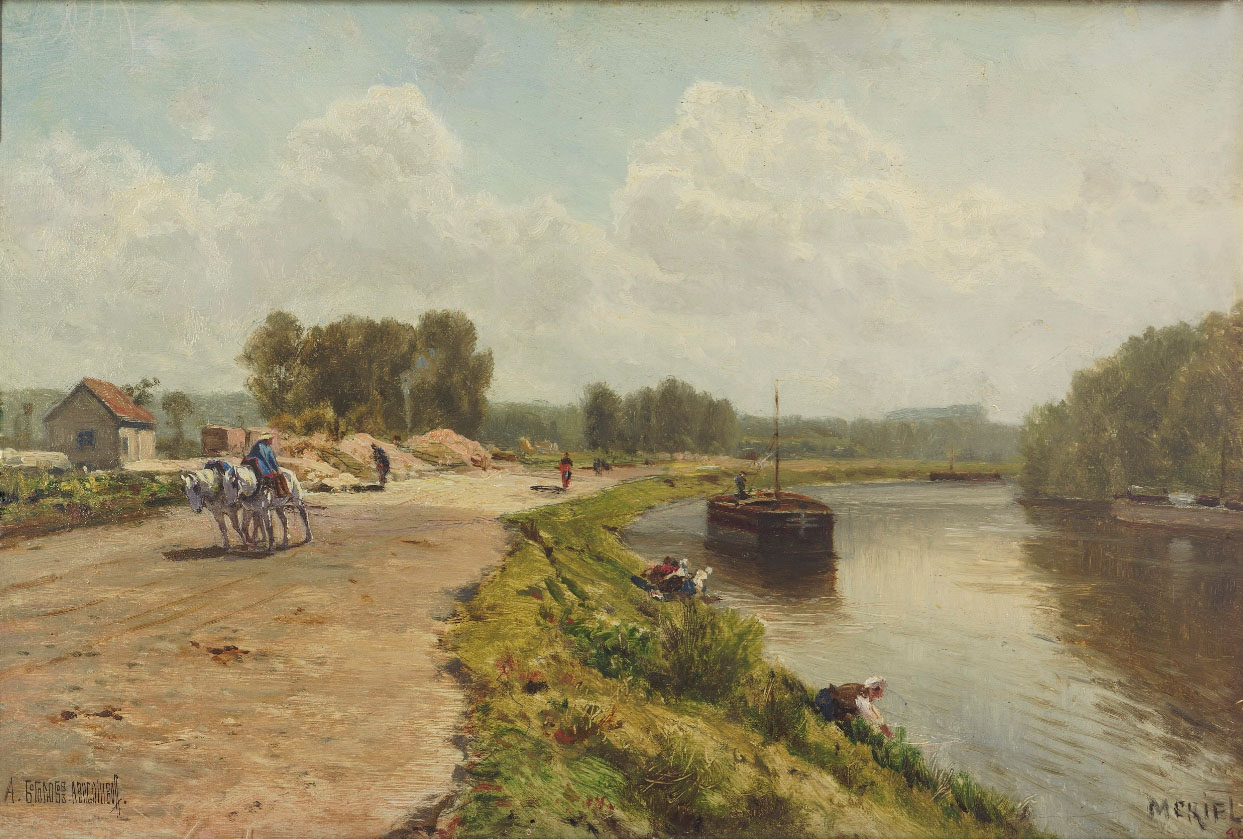
The Oise River Valley. Mériel. 1880s
The Russian Museum

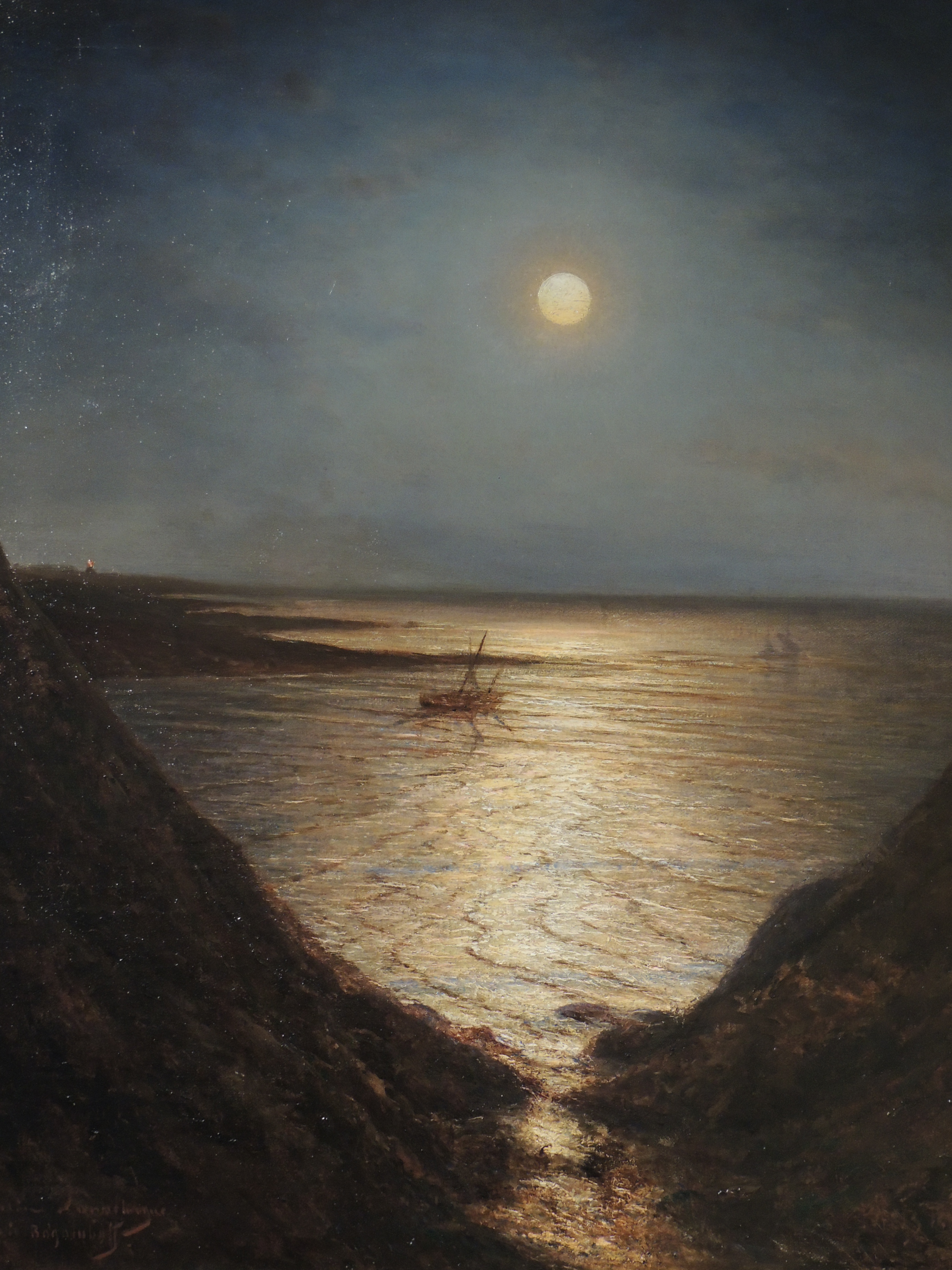
Moonlight at Pornic

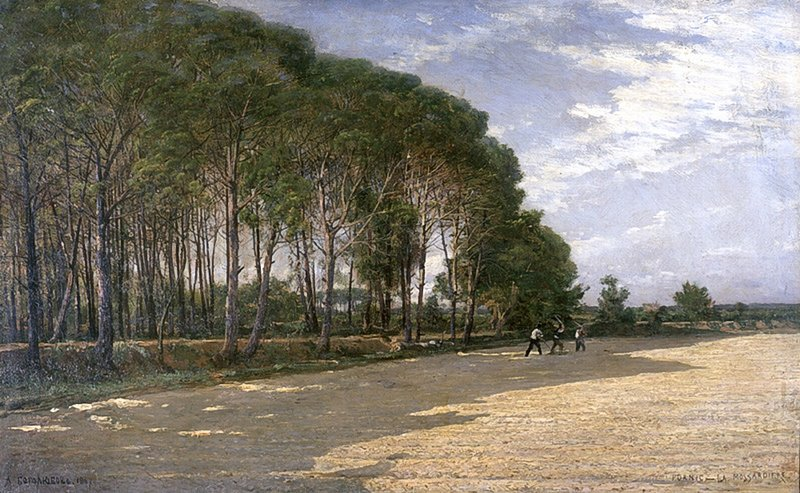
Pine Grove in Pornic, 1867
Radishchev Art Museum

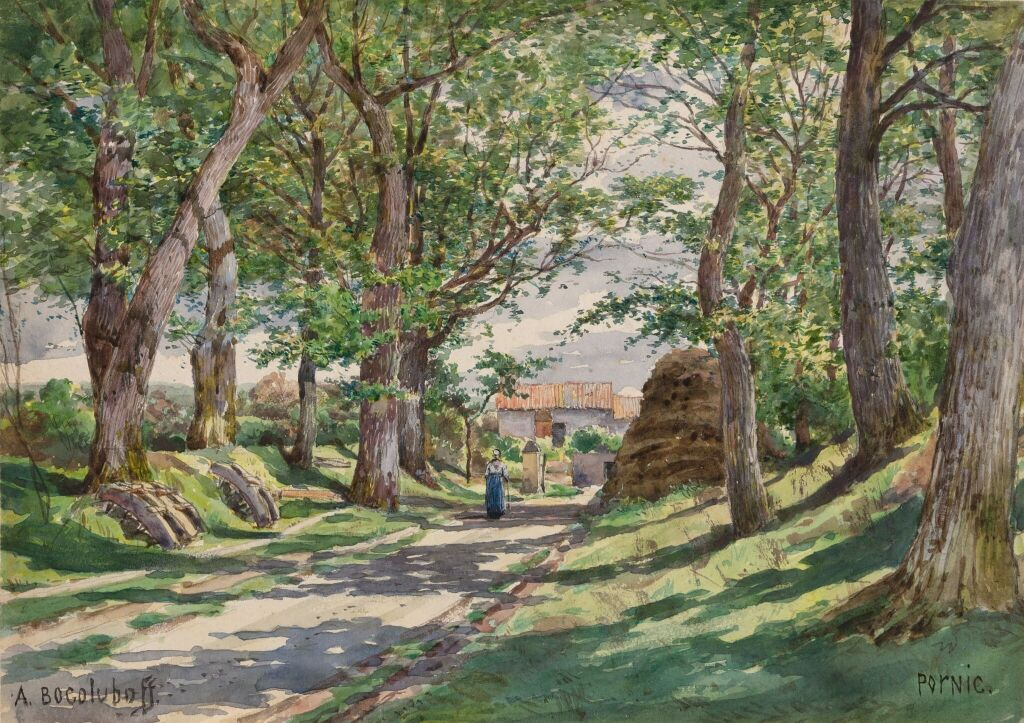
Pornic. France. 1867
Tretyakov Gallery

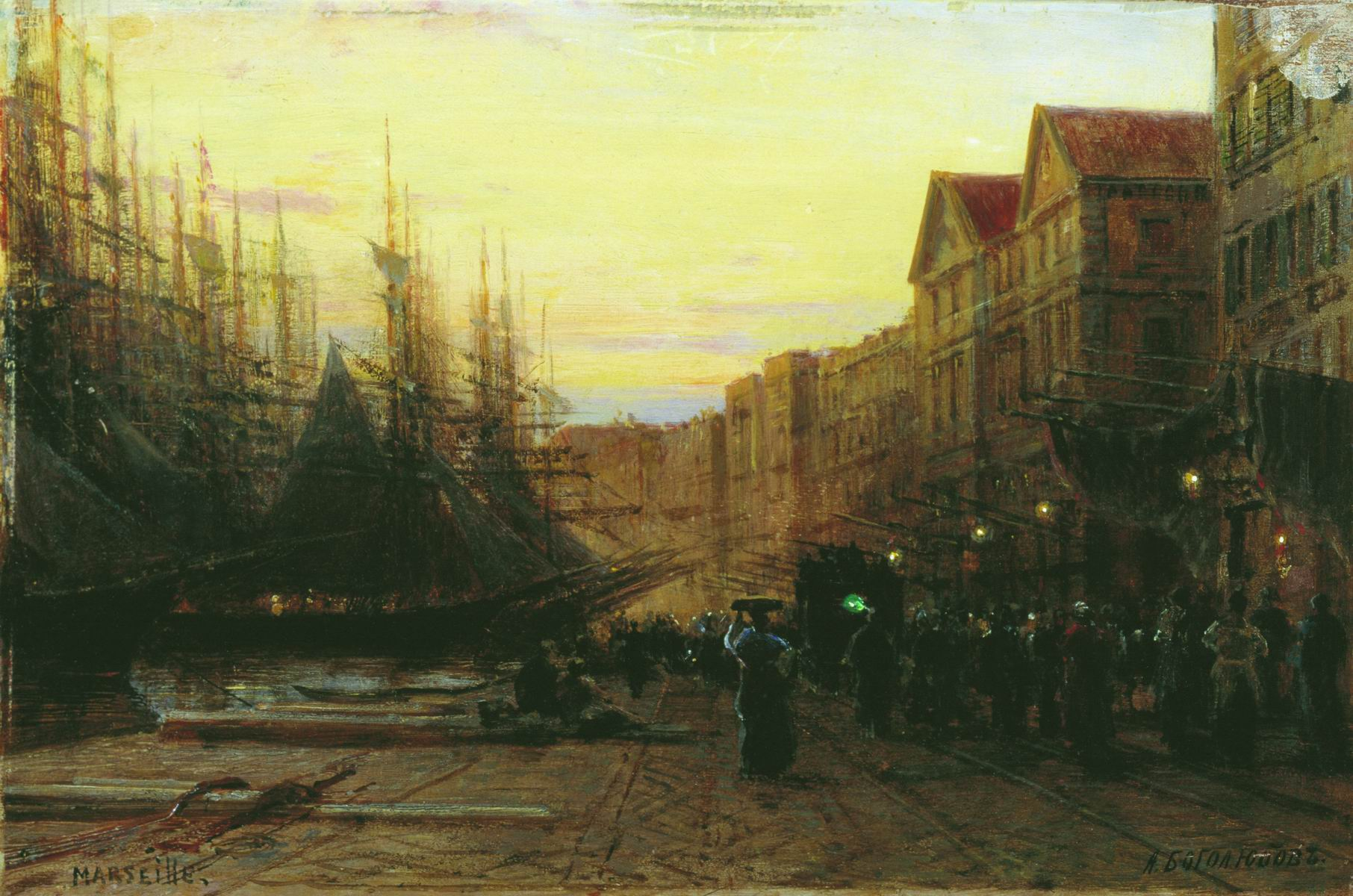
Marseille-Fos Port 1860s
Nikanor Onatsky Regional Art Museum

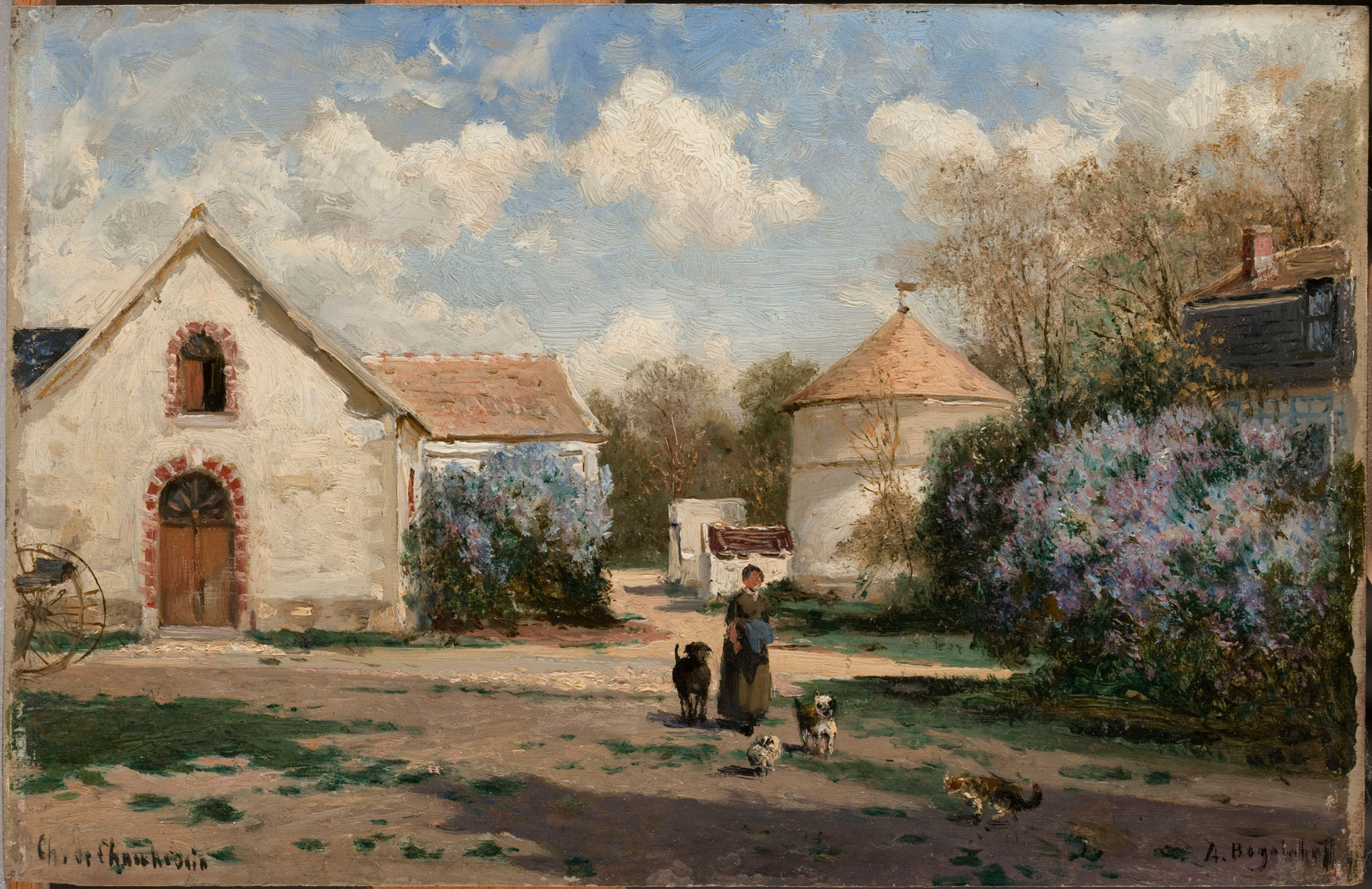
Scenery outside Paris with woman and animals
Finnish National Gallery

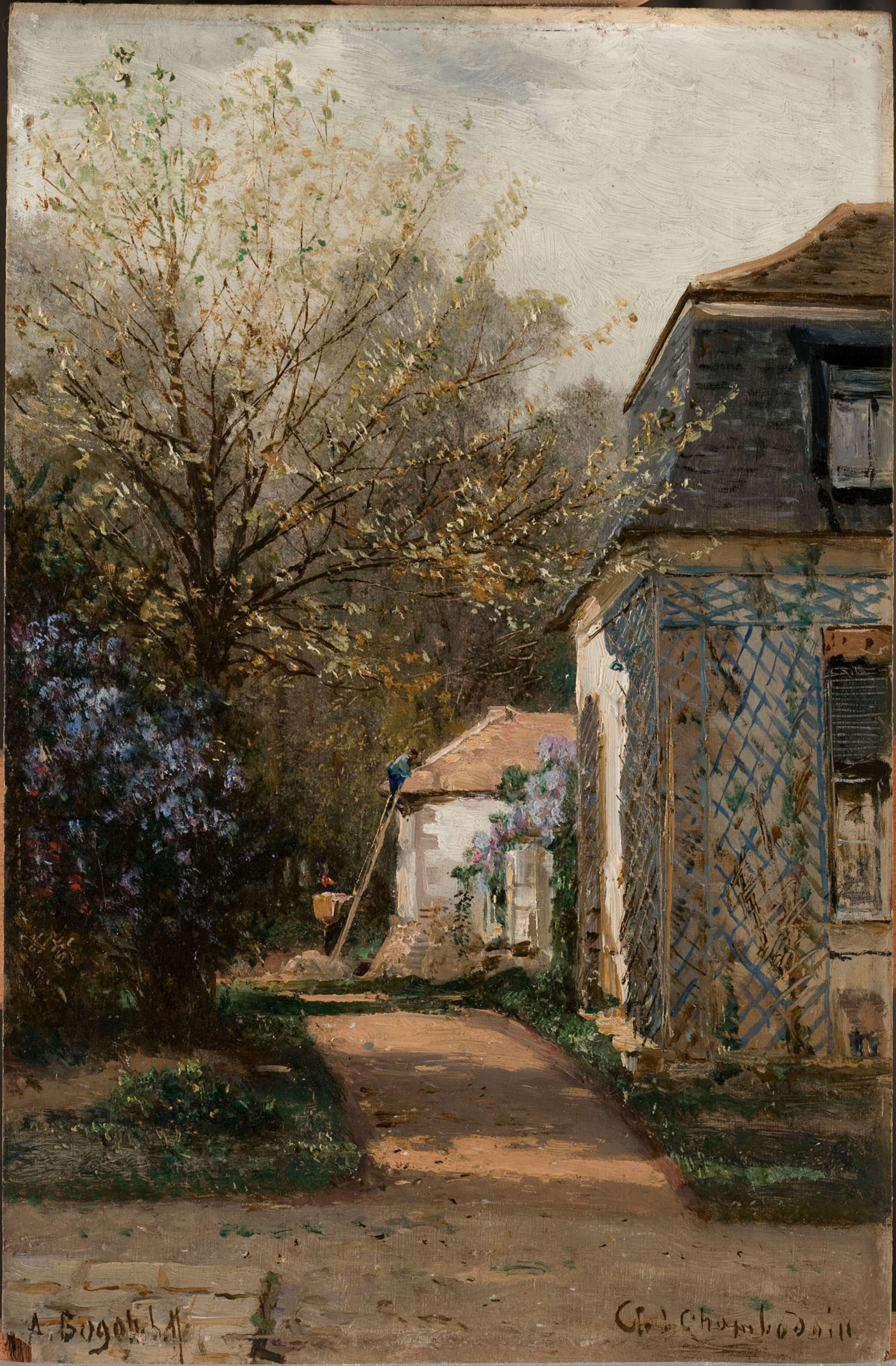
Scenery outside Paris
Finnish National Gallery

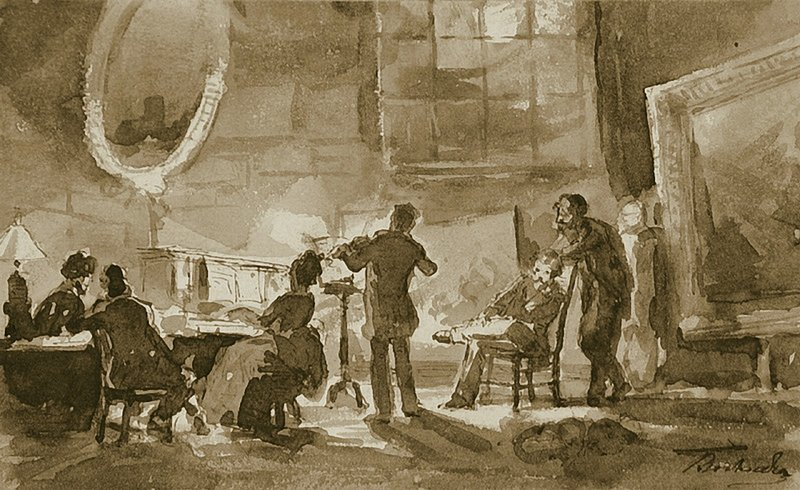
Party in Paris between 1874 and 1875
Radishchev Art Museum

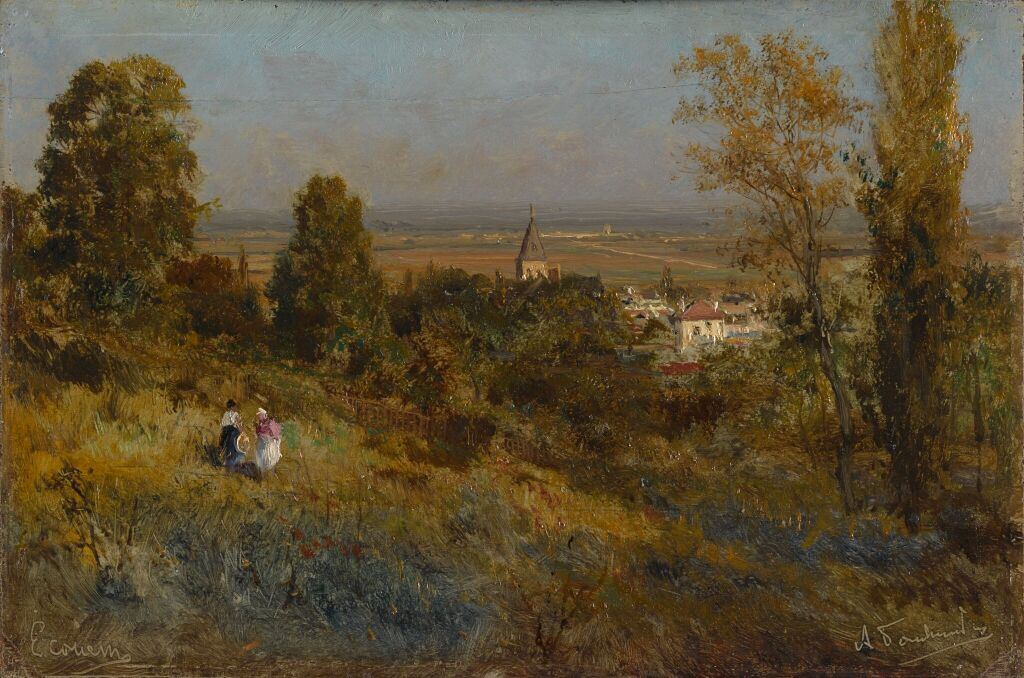
In the neighbourhood of Paris. Écouen. 1880
Tretyakov Gallery

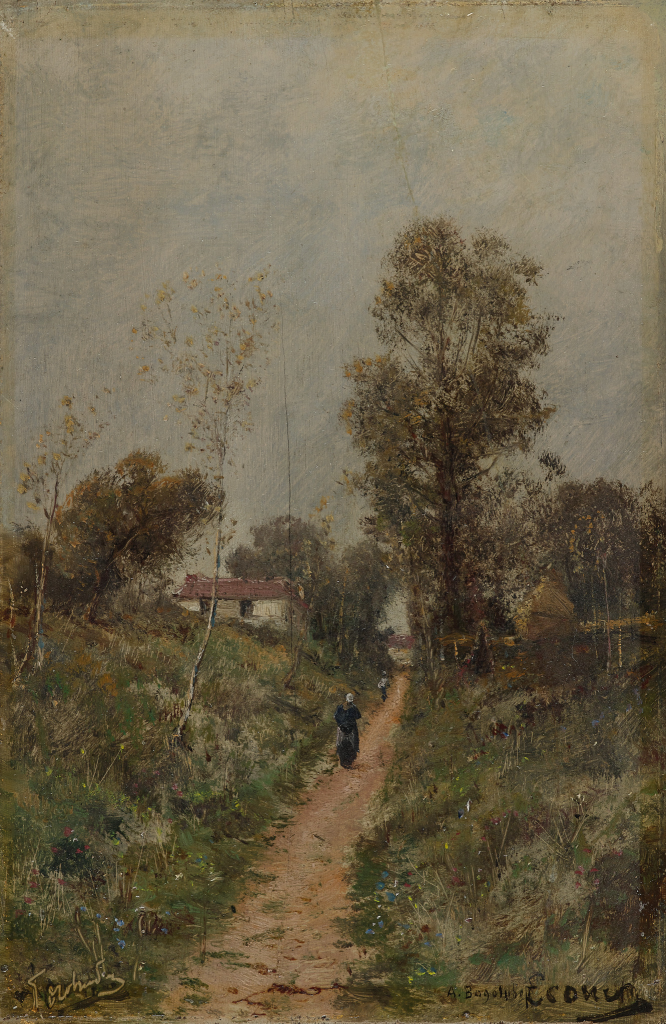
Pathway. Écouen. 1880
Tretyakov Gallery

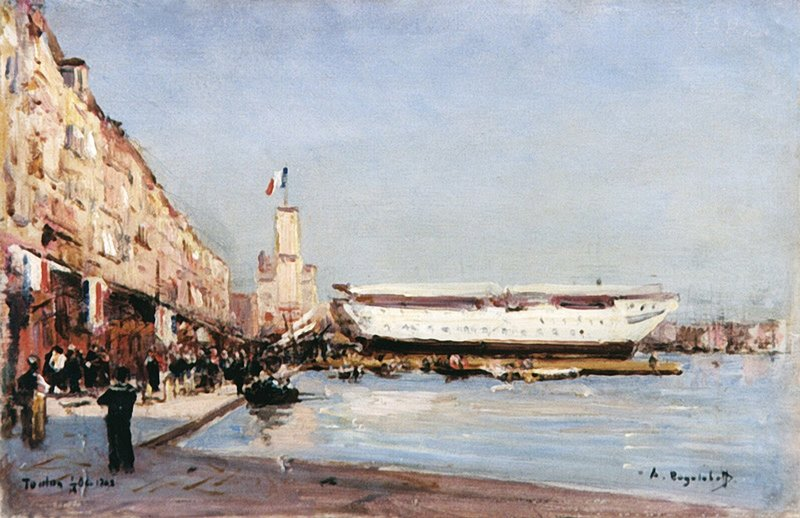
Toulon, 1893
Radishchev Art Museum

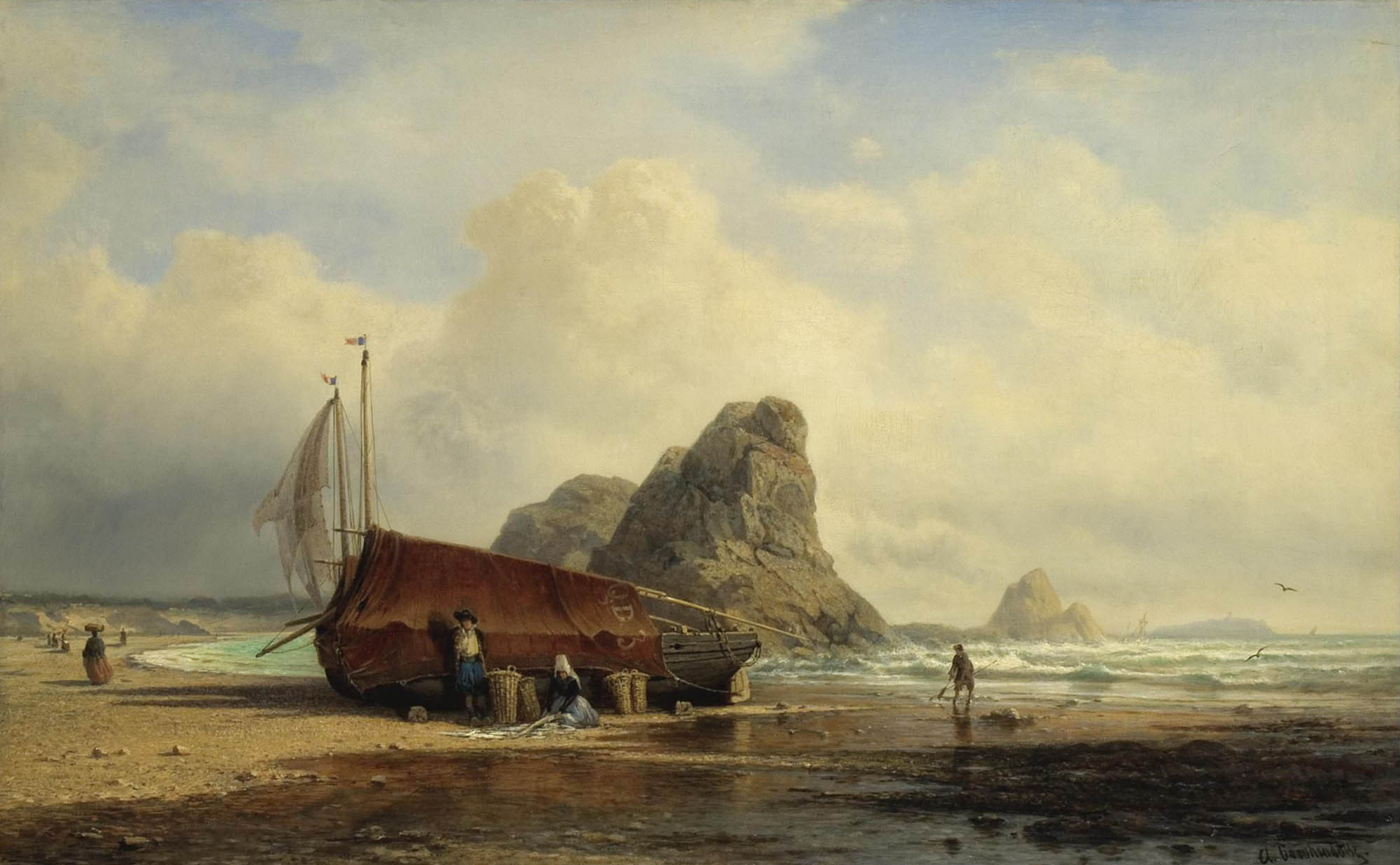
The Scene on the Beach, Brittany
Private collection

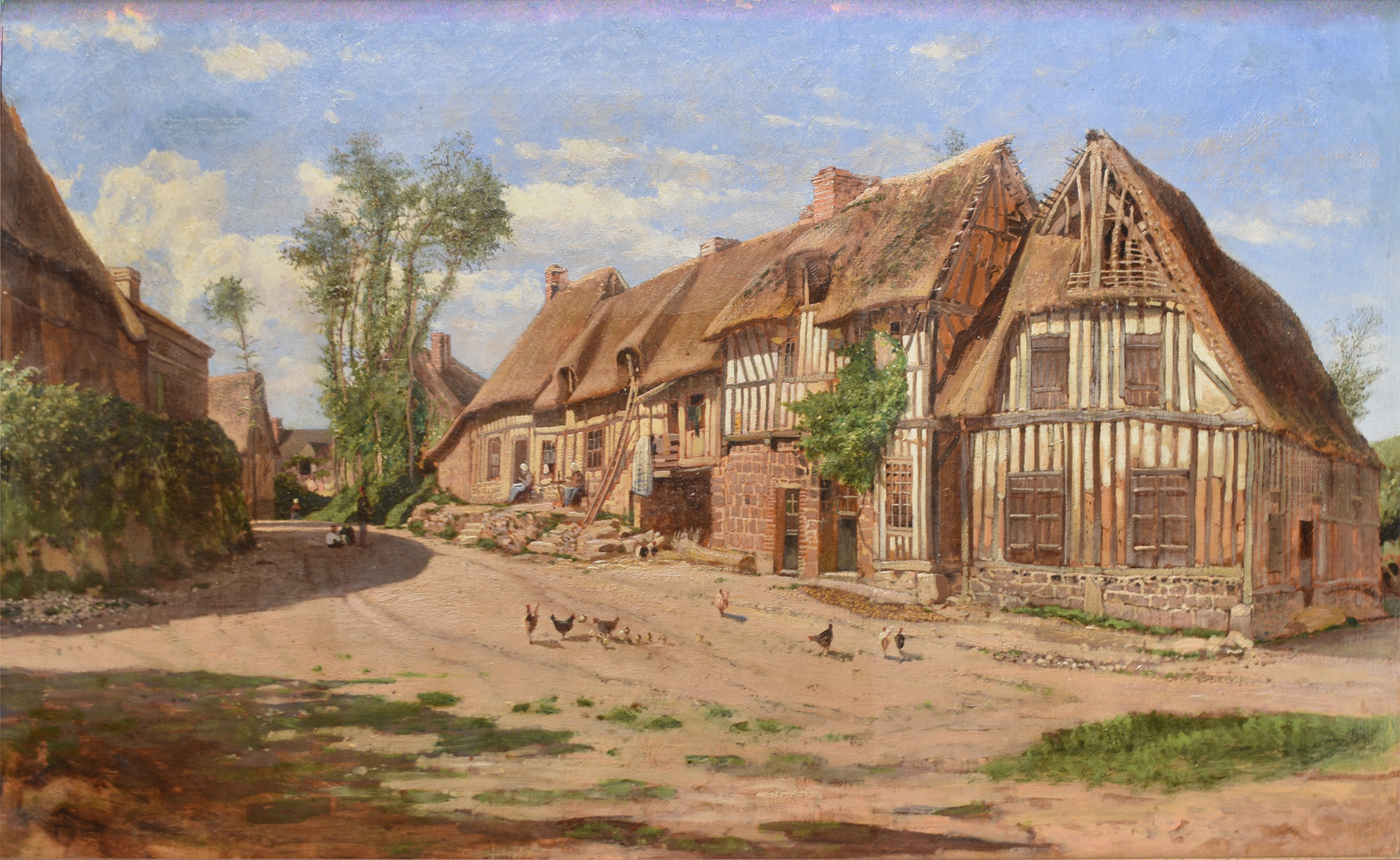
A village street in Brittany

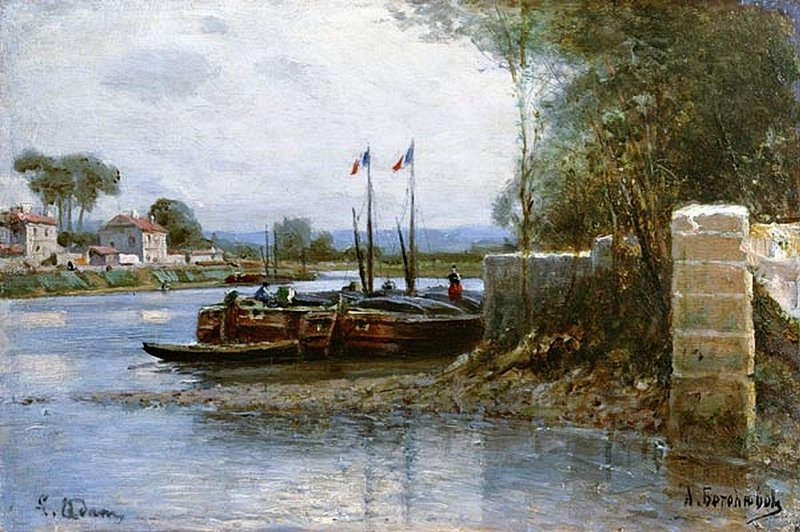
L'Isle-Adam, 1881
Radishchev Art Museum

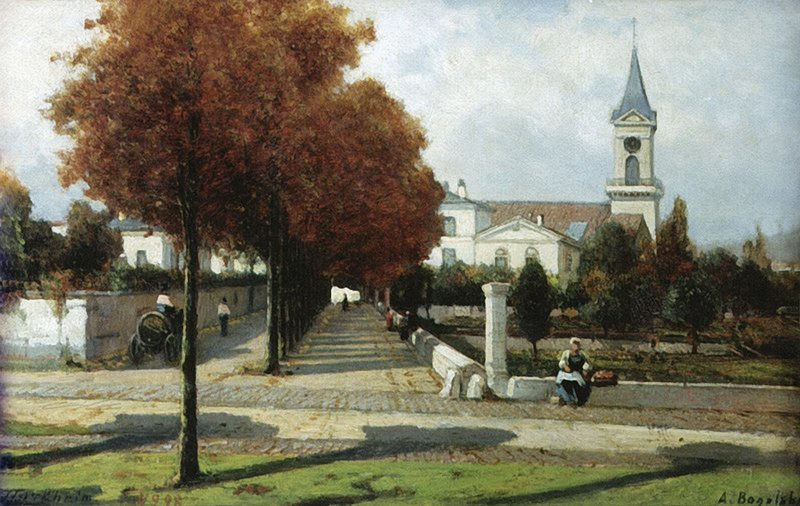
Turckheim, 1884
Radishchev Art Museum

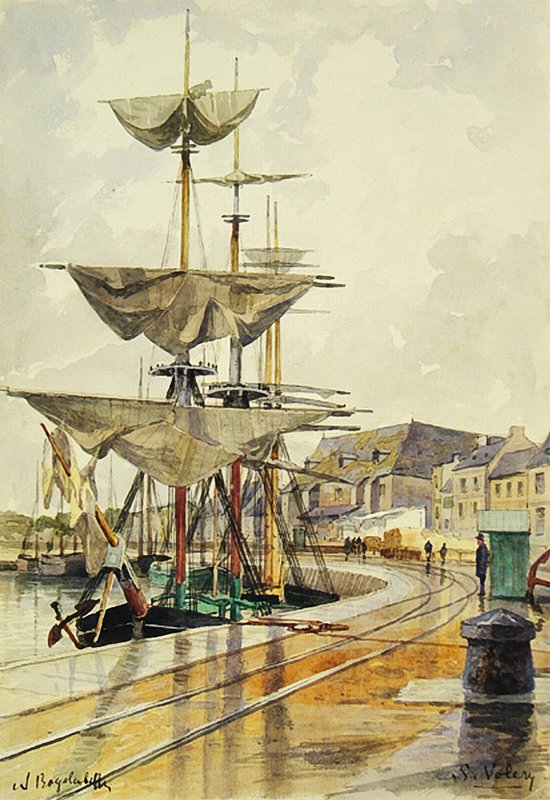
Saint-Valery
Radishchev Art Museum

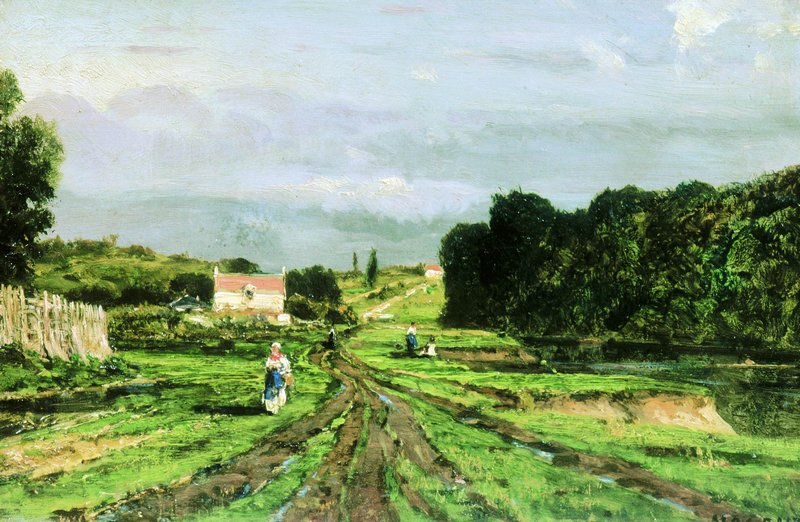
Nogent-sur-Marne. After the Rain. 1886
Radishchev Art Museum

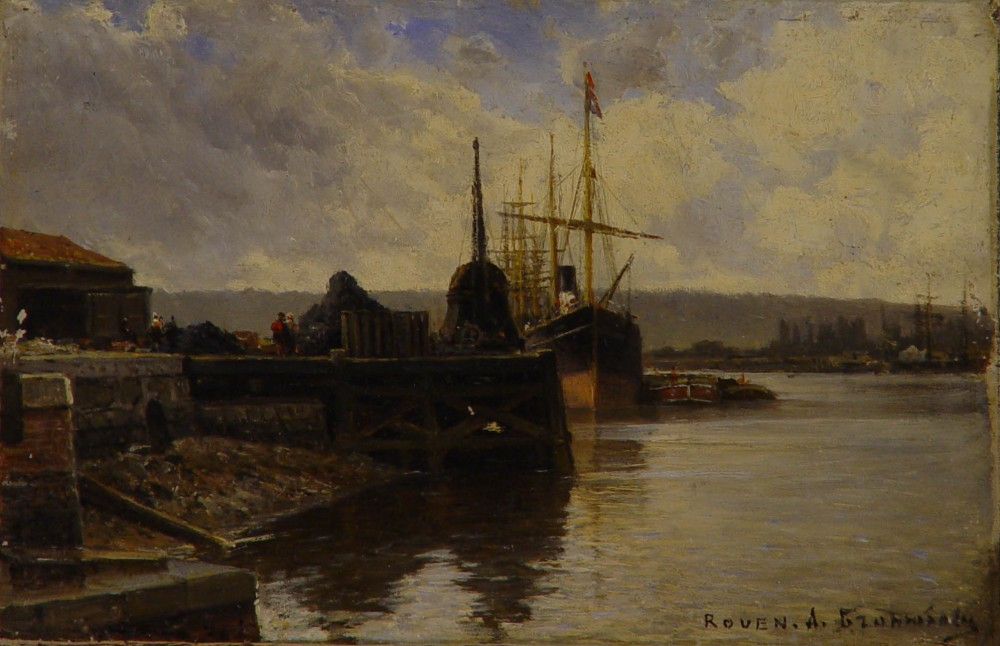
Port of Rouen, c. 1889

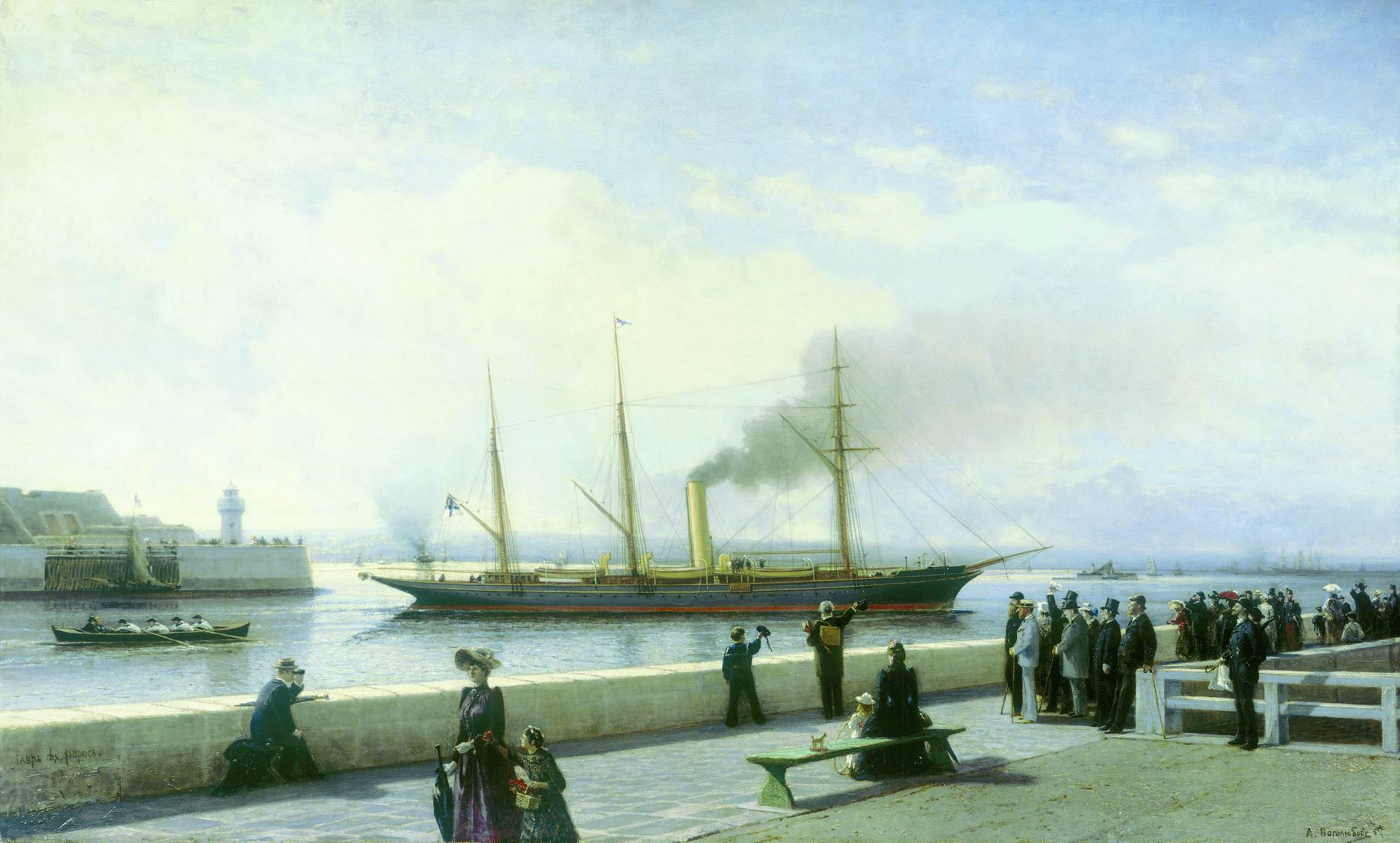
Port of Le Havre, 1852

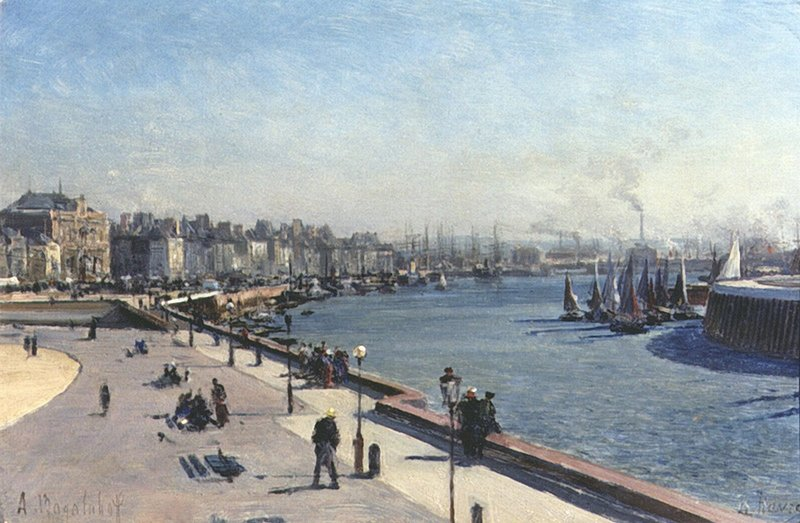
Le Havre, 1893
Radishchev Art Museum

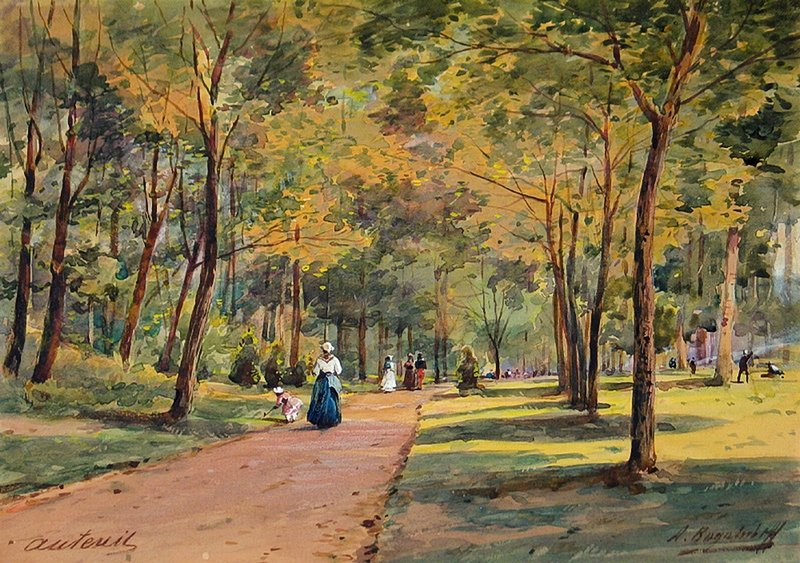
Bois de Boulogne
Radishchev Art Museum

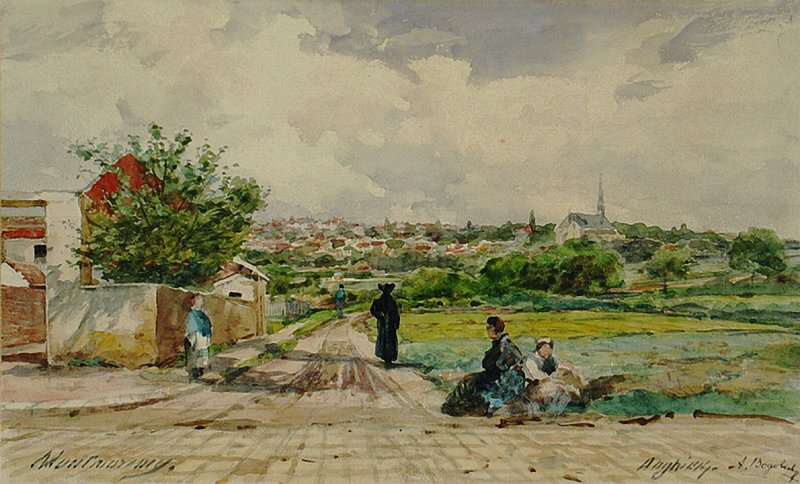
Montmorency
Radishchev Art Museum

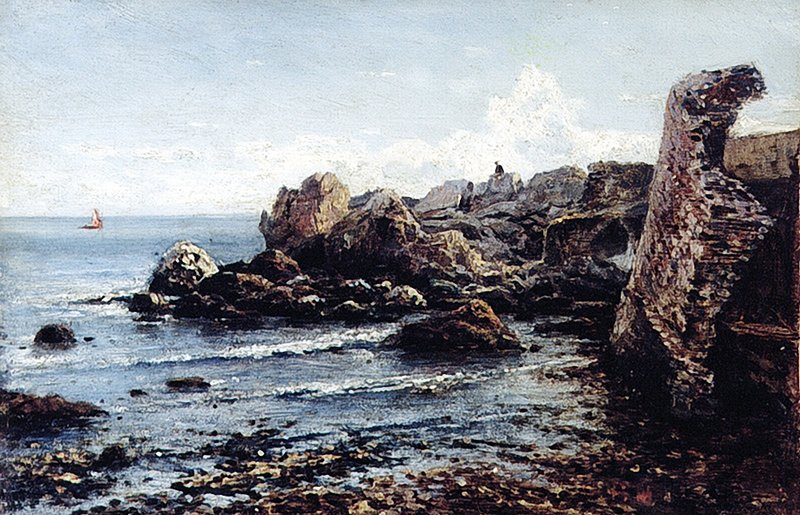
Nice
Radishchev Art Museum
Italy

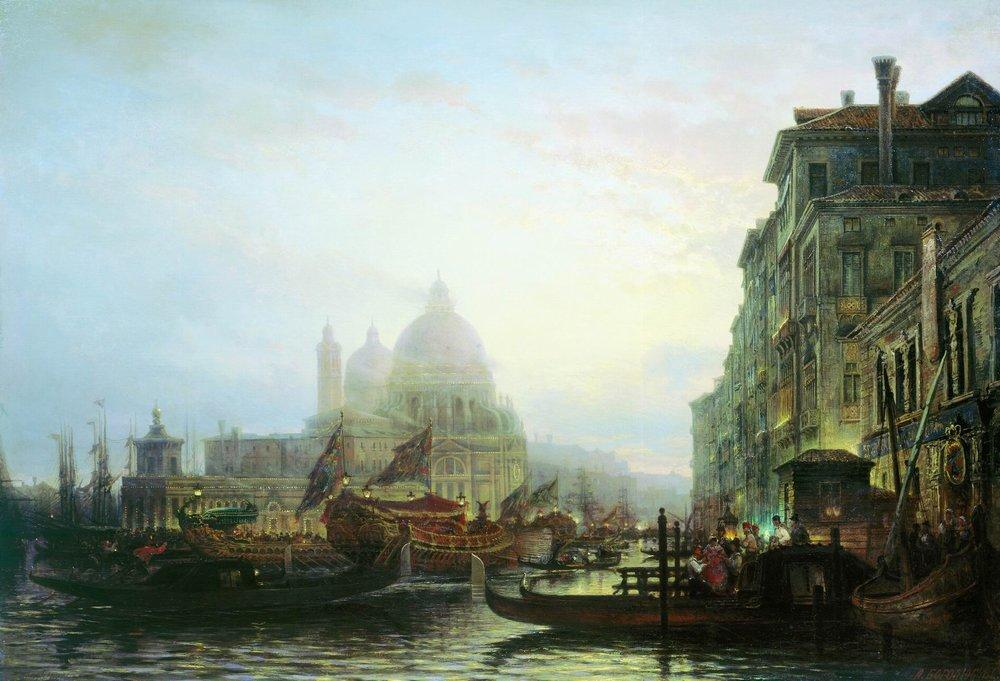
Venice at night, 1850s

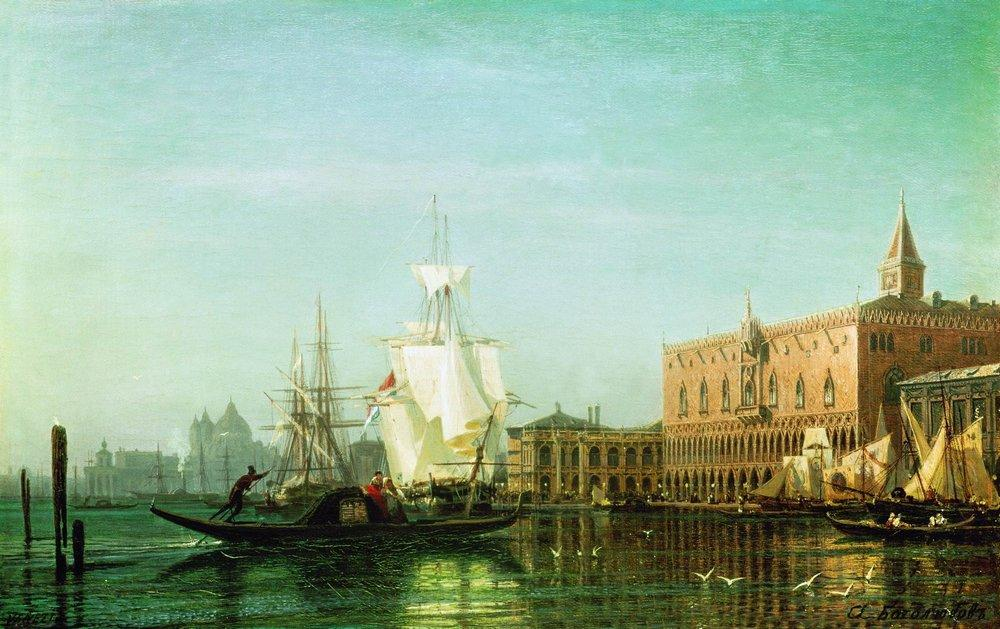
Venice

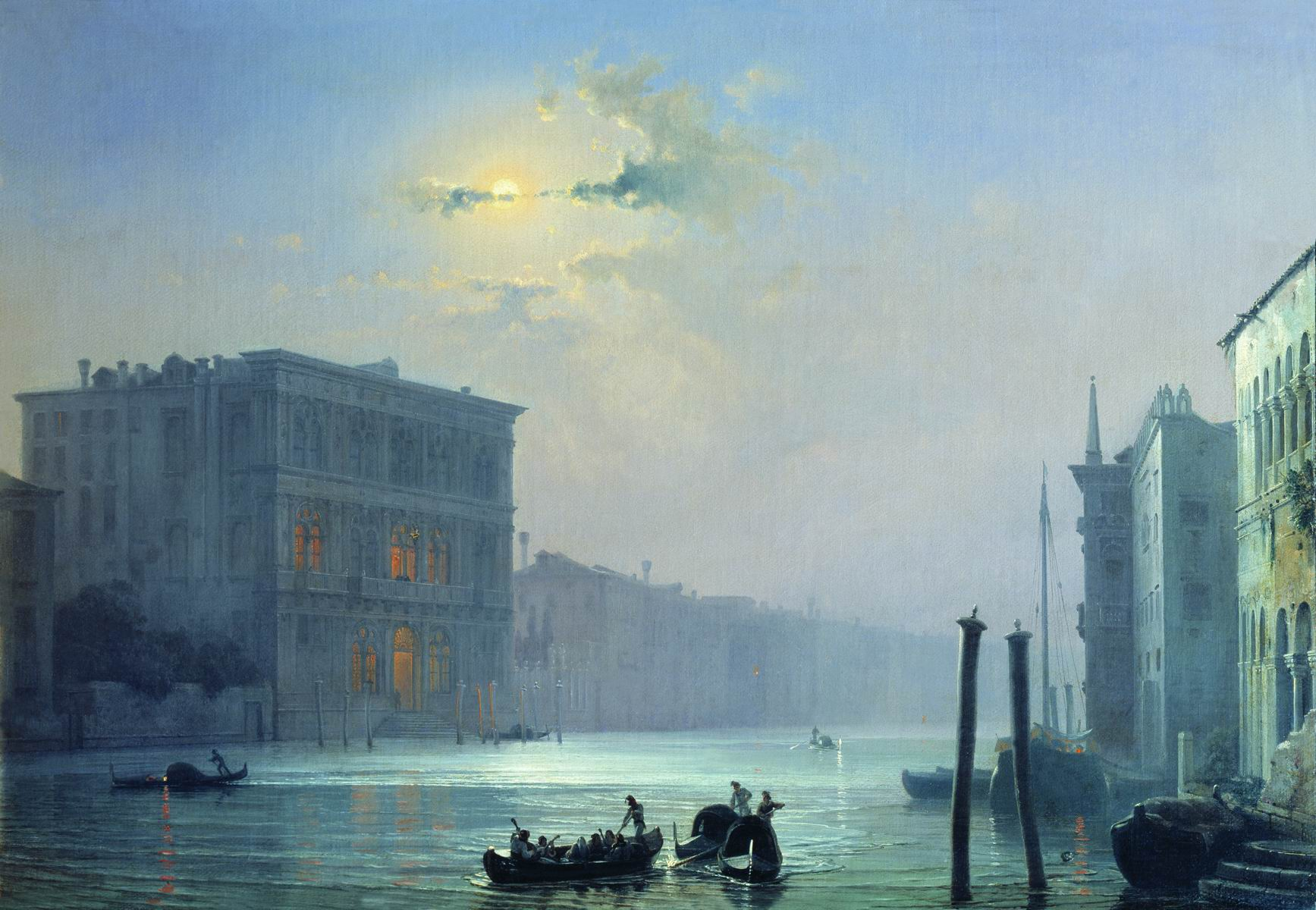
Moonlit night. Grand Canal (Venice). 1850s

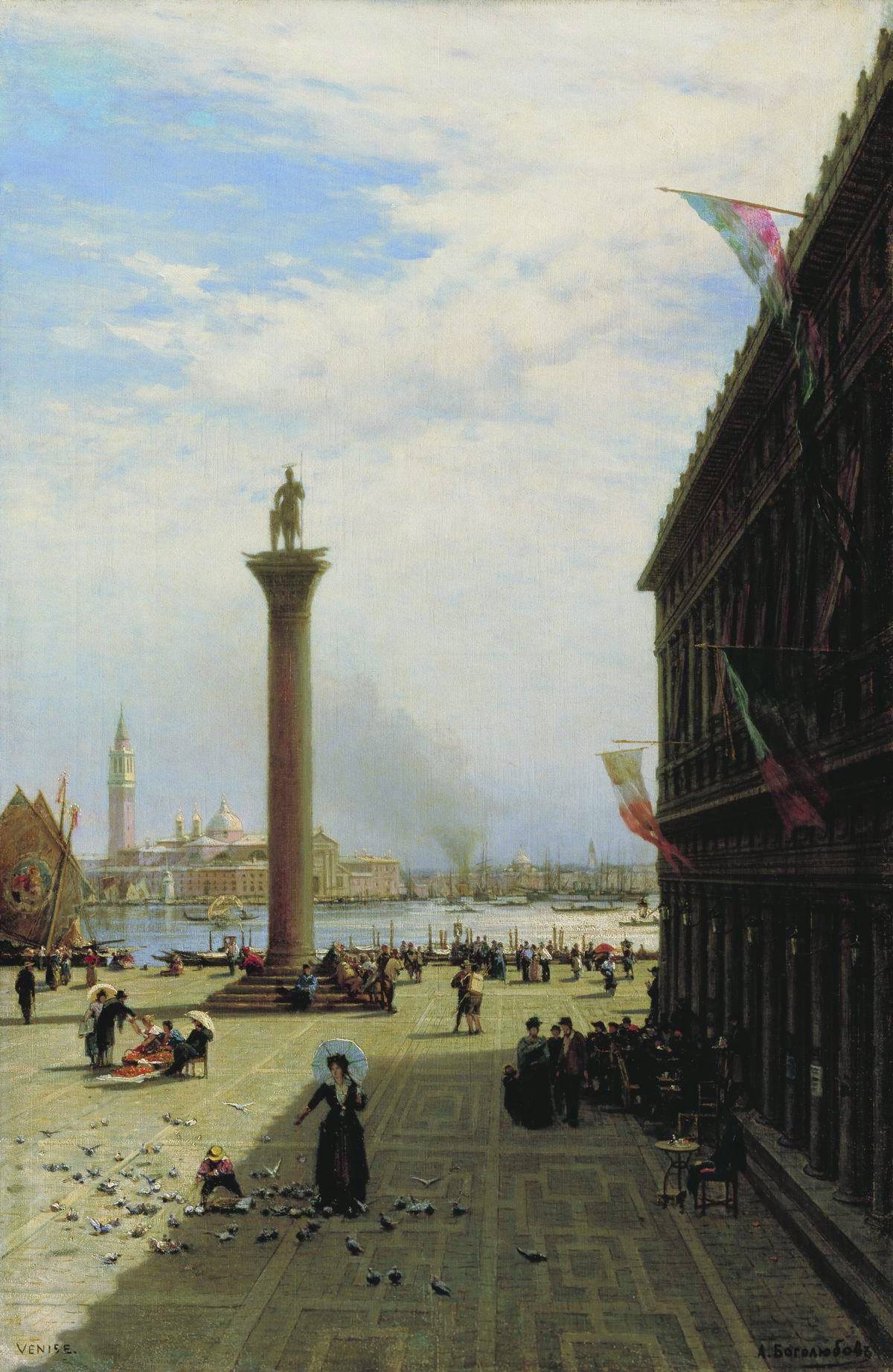
Venice. Piazzetta Square. 1870

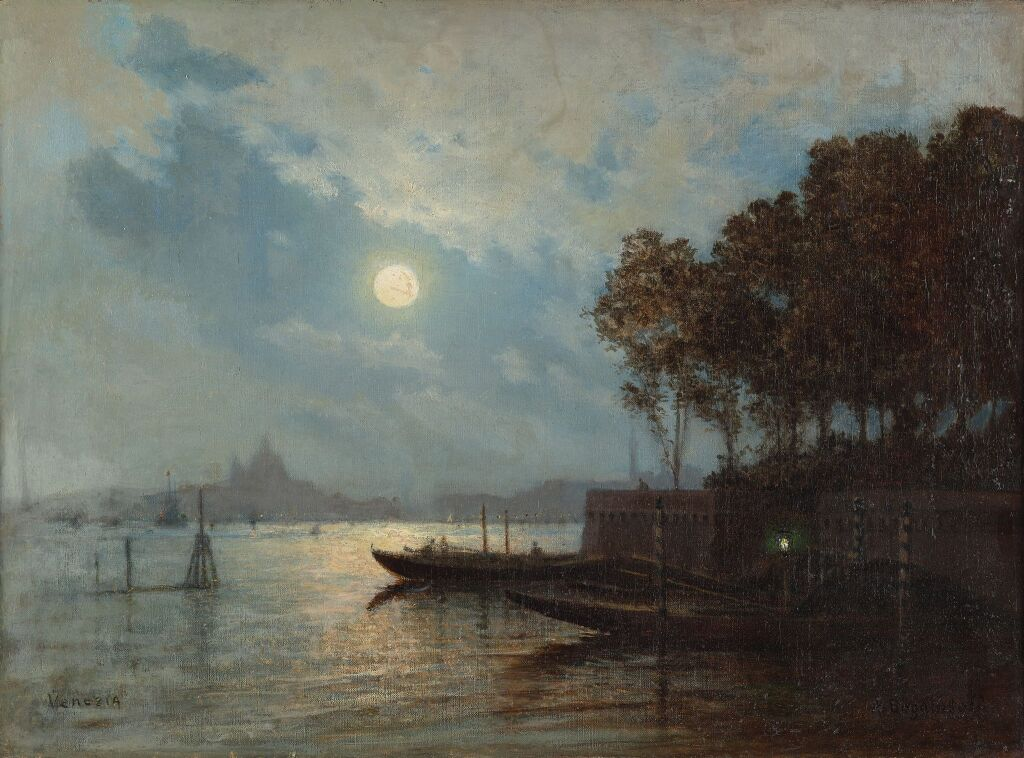
Venice, 1870s
Tretyakov Gallery

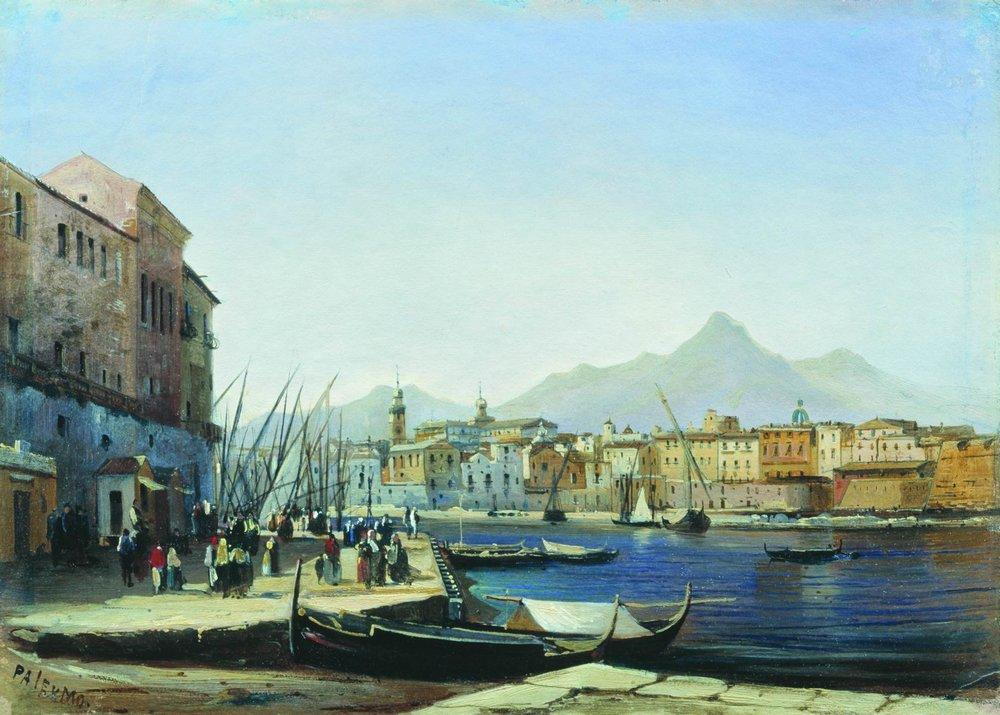
Palermo, 1850s

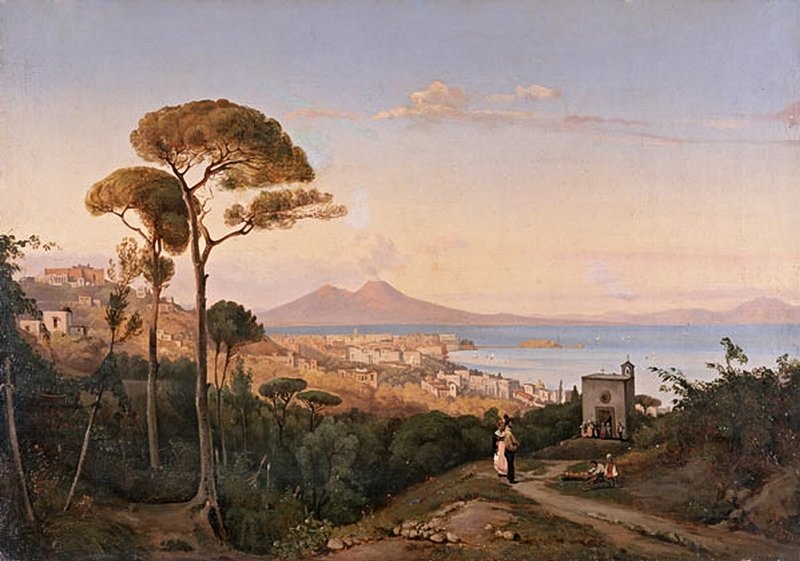
A View of Naples, 1851
Radishchev Art Museum

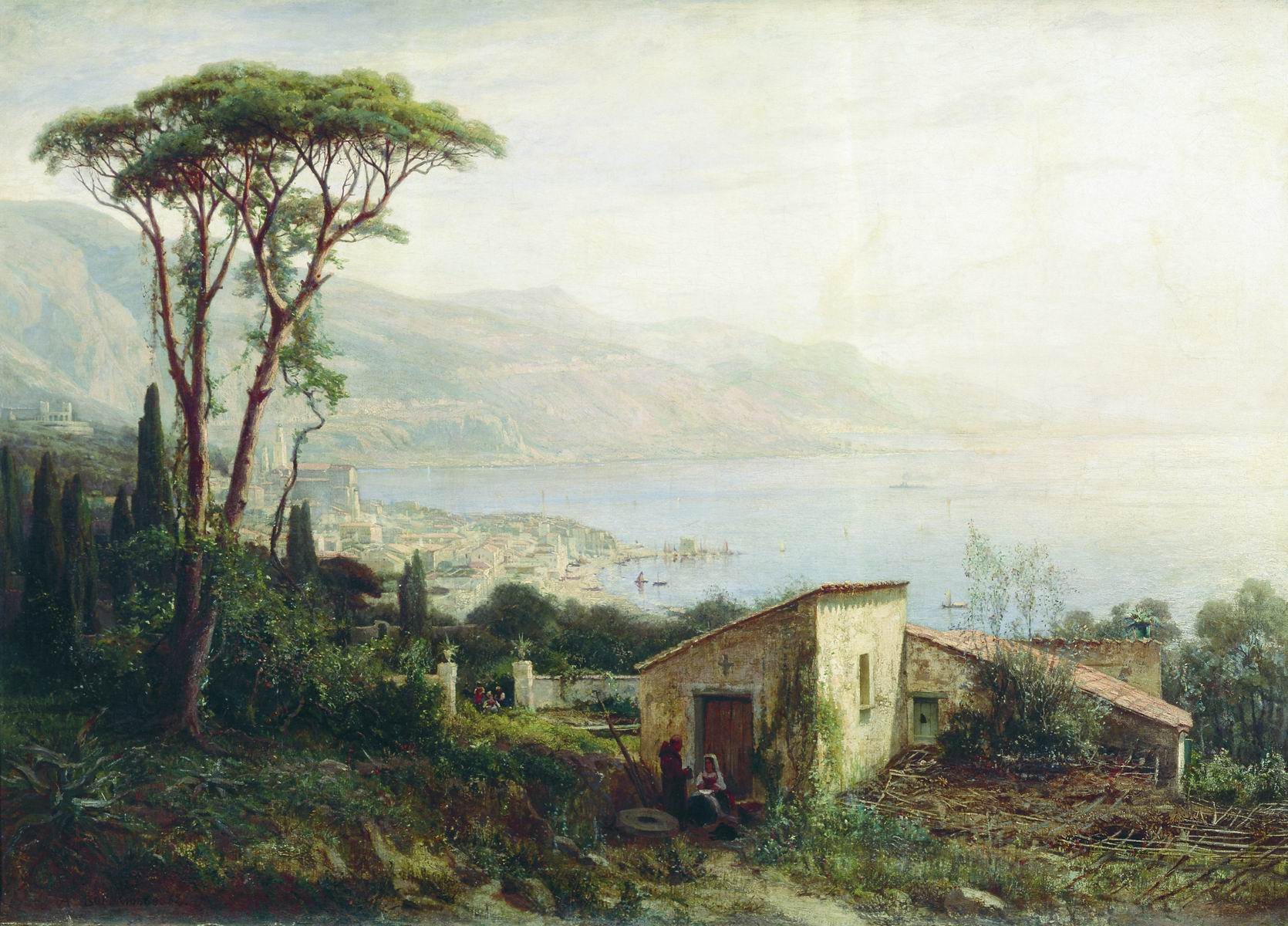
Gulf of Naples

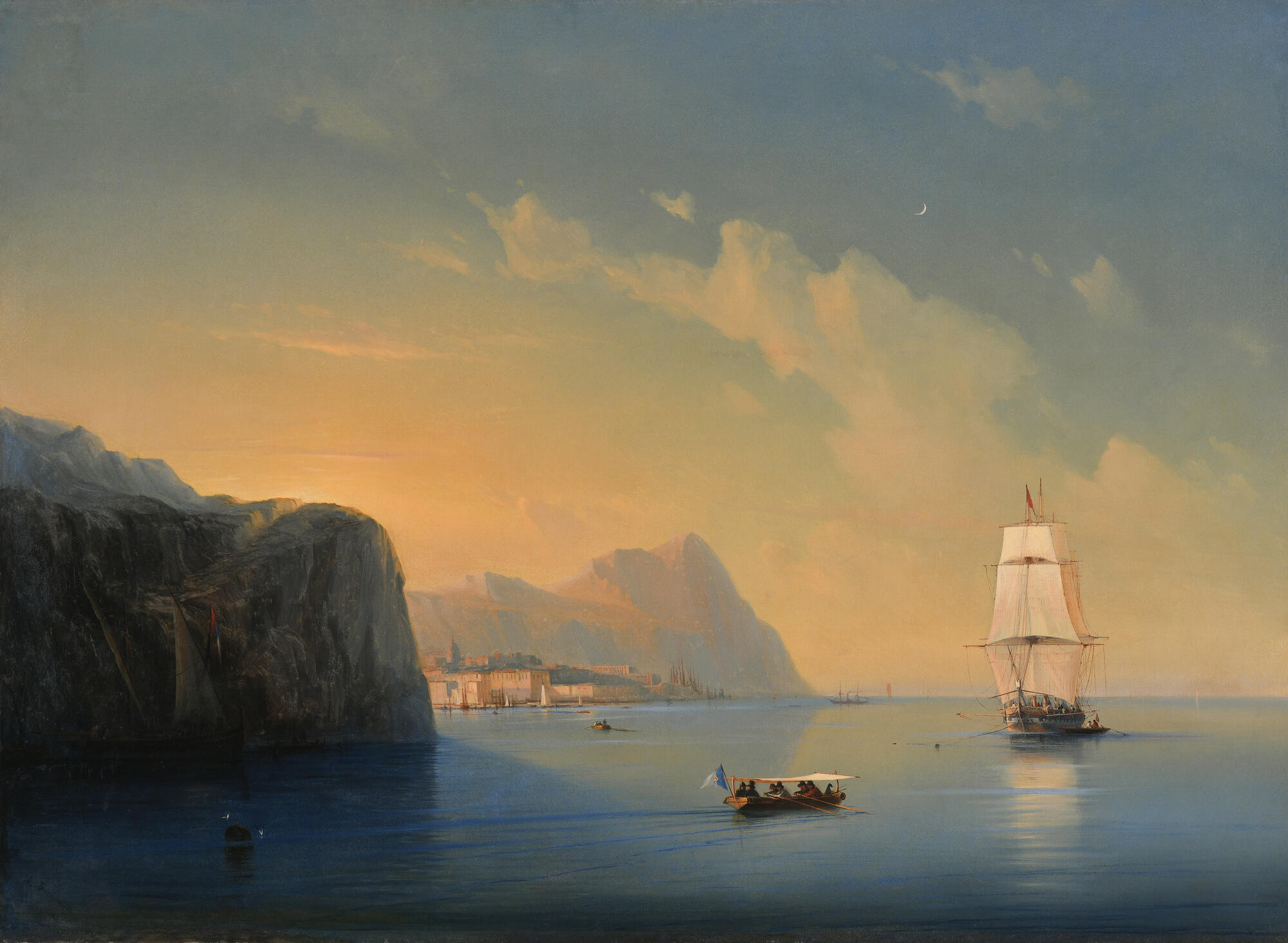
Italian coast, 1854
Novosibirsk State Art Museum

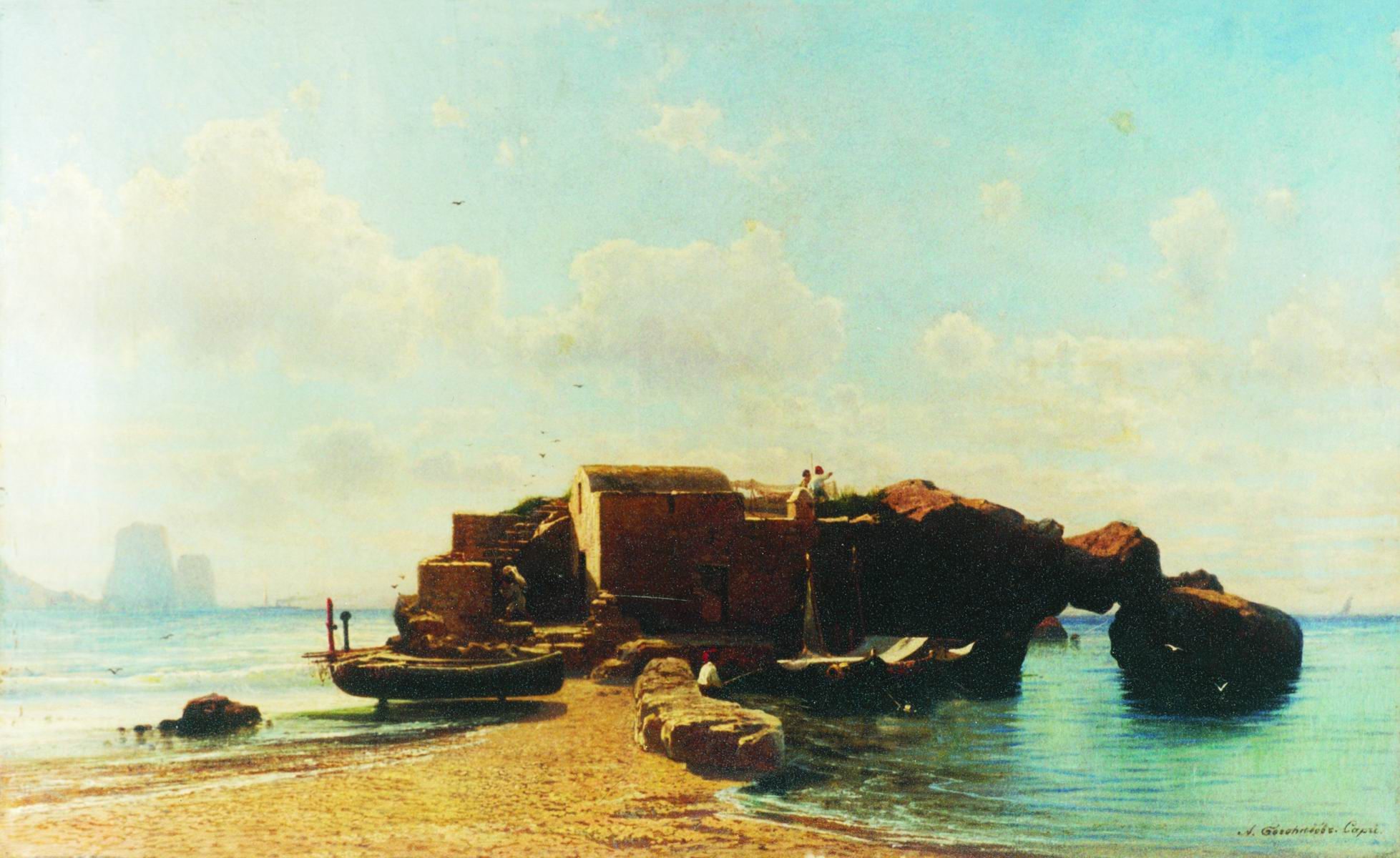
Little harbour. Capri. 1855.
Private collection

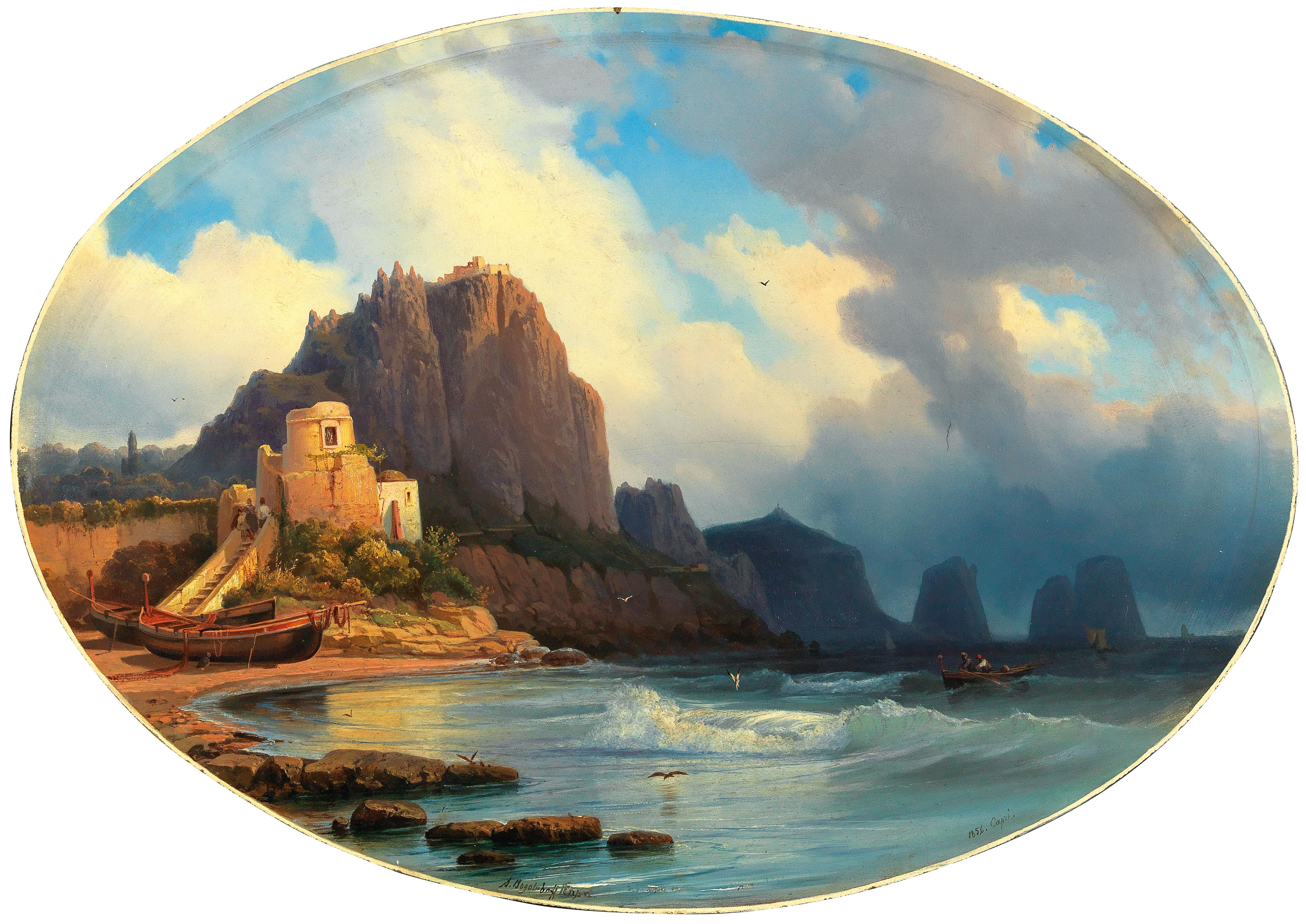
Capri, 1856
Private collection

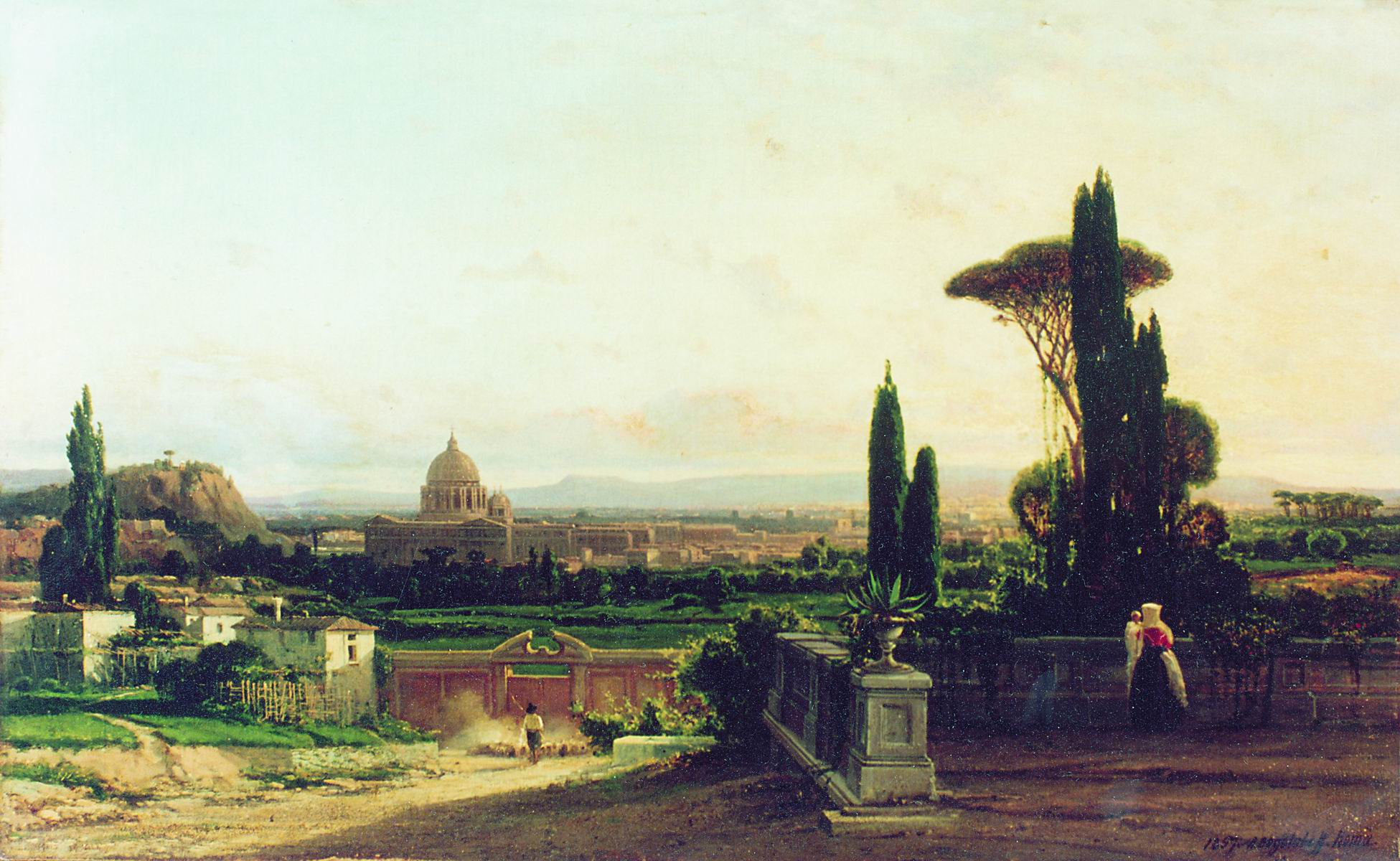
Rome, 1857
Private collection

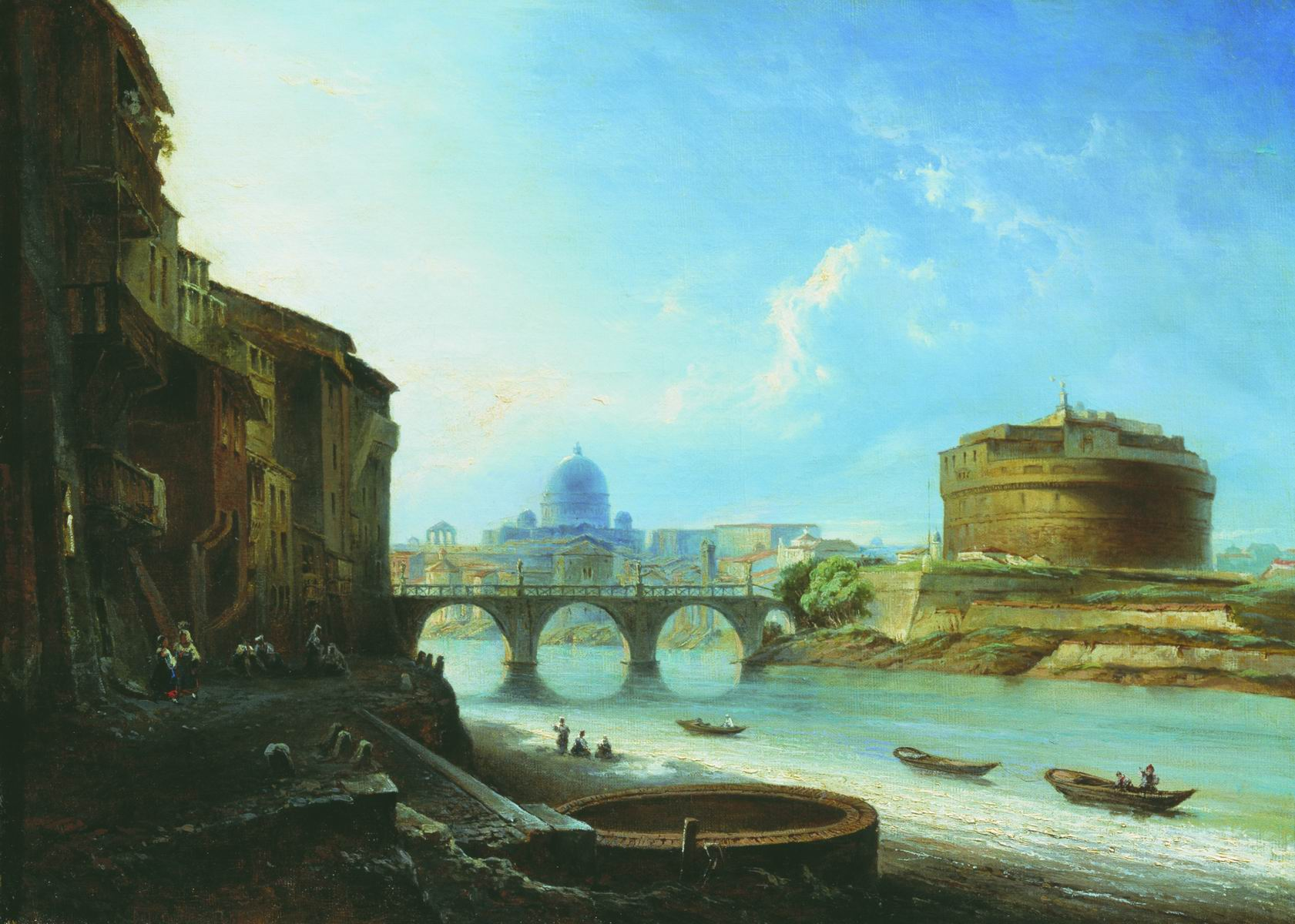
Castel Sant'Angelo, 1859

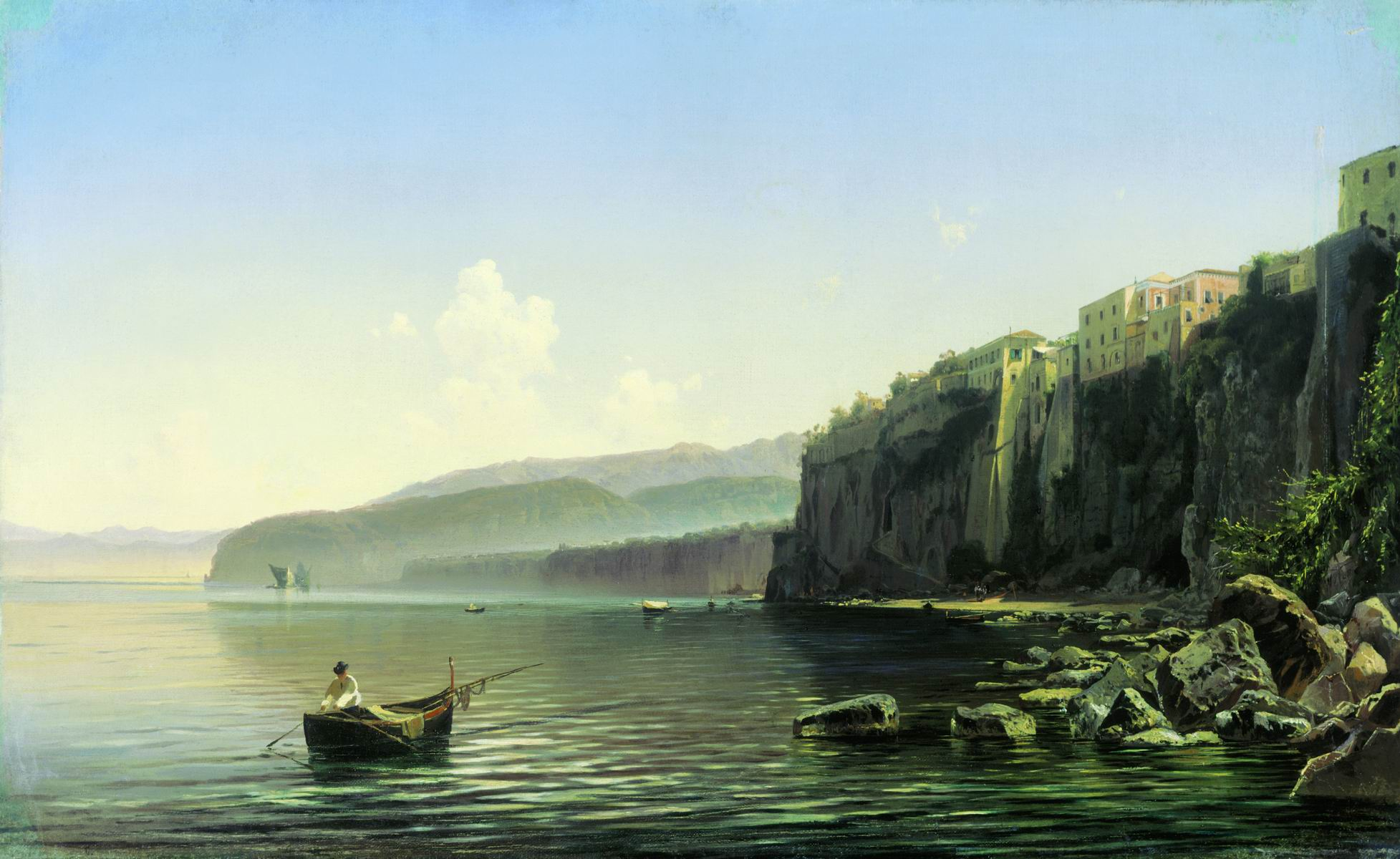
The seashore (Sorrento), 1850s

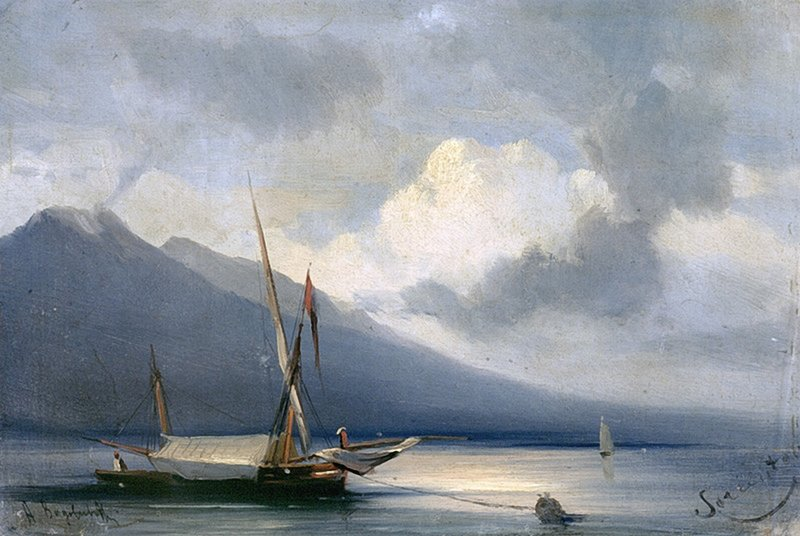
Sorrento, 1850s
Radishchev Art Museum

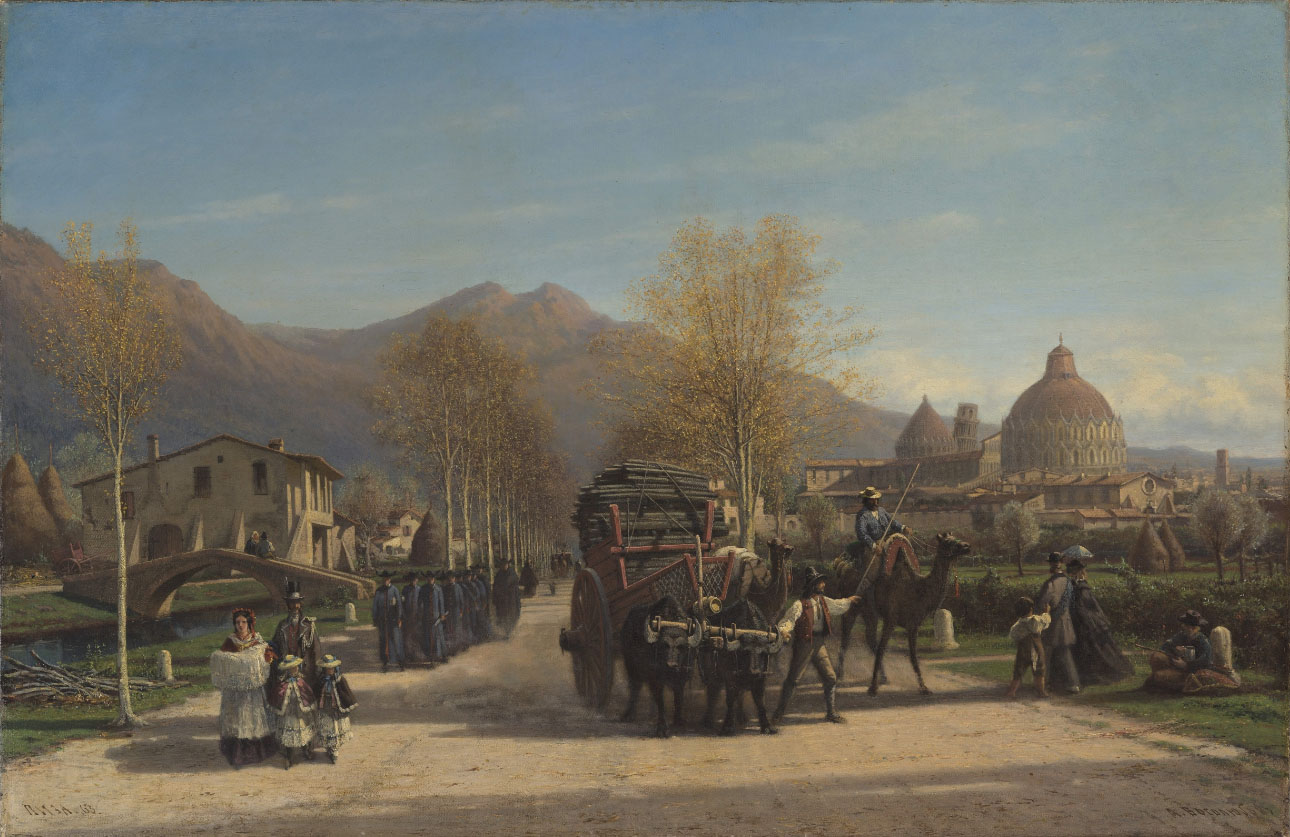
Pisa. View of the Baptisterium and the Cathedral (1863)
The Russian Museum

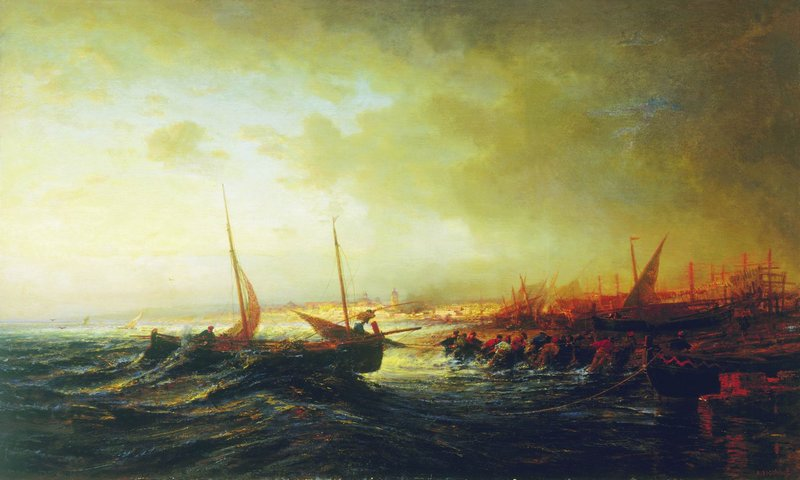
A View of Alassio, 1880
Radishchev Art Museum

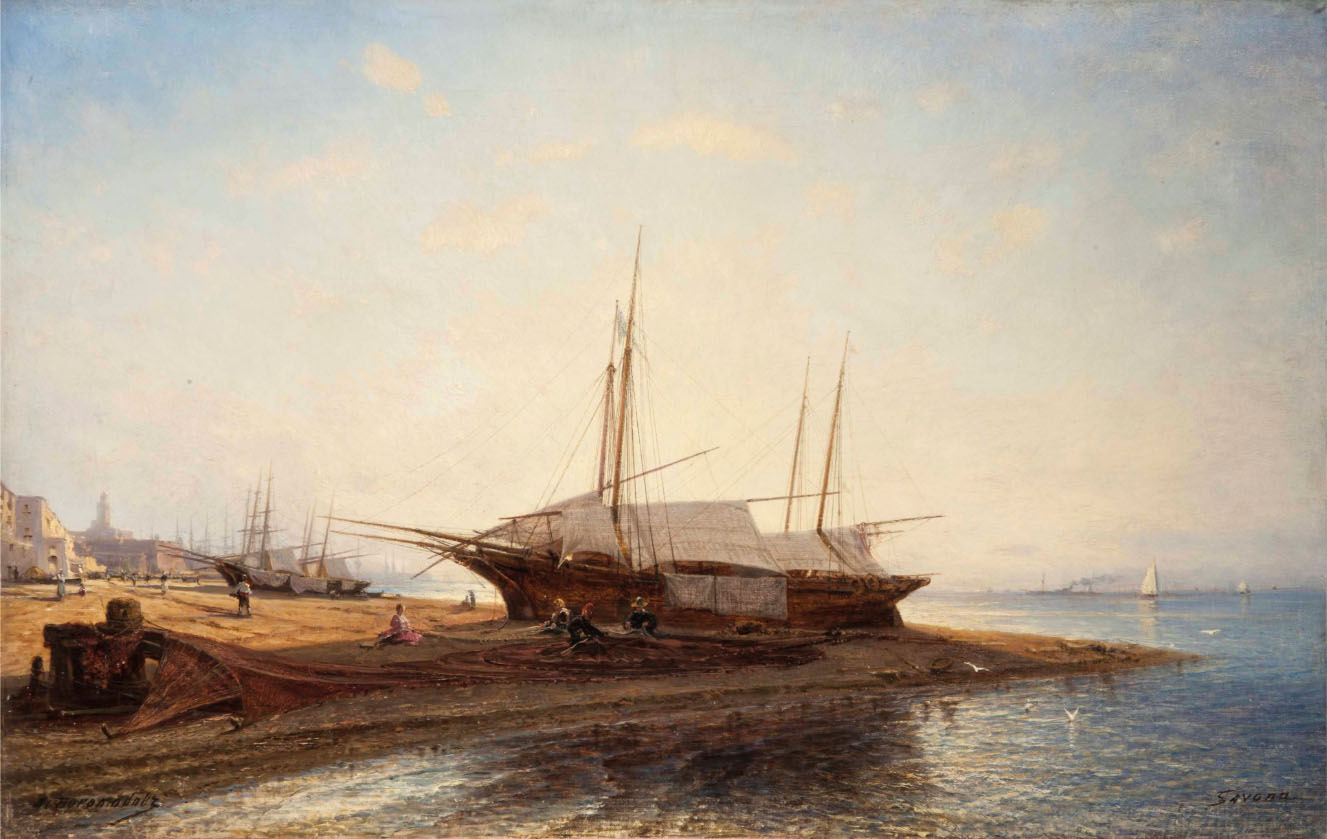
The seaside in Savona, 1880
The Russian Museum

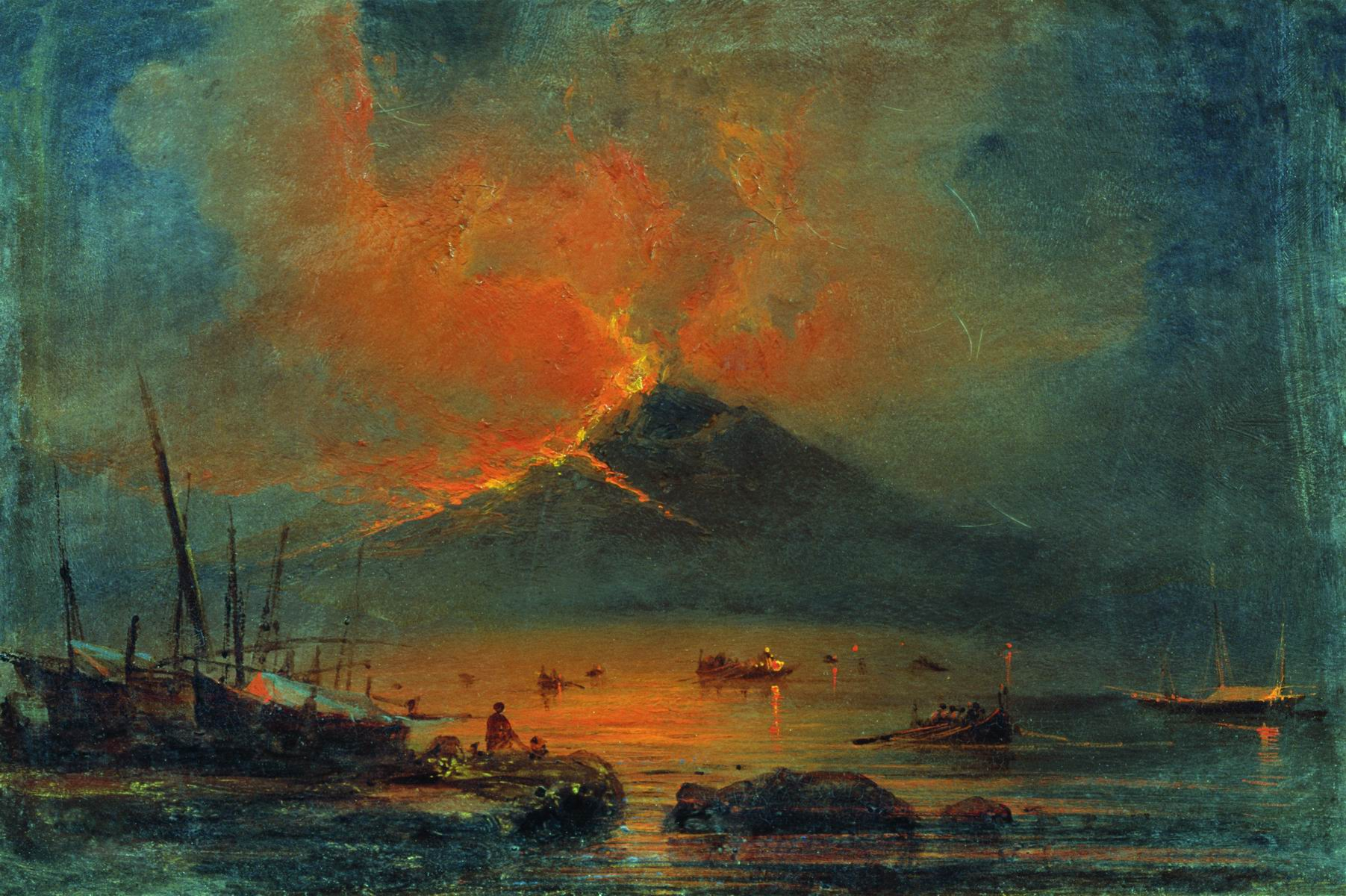
Vesuvius eruption

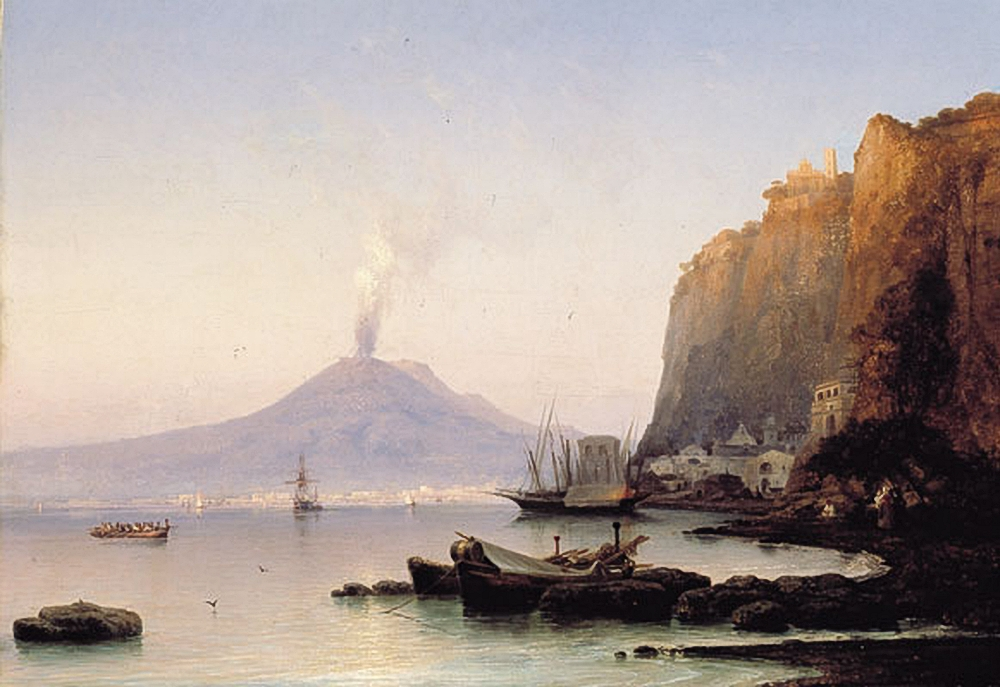
View of Vesuvius from the village of Vico
Private collection
Ottoman Empire

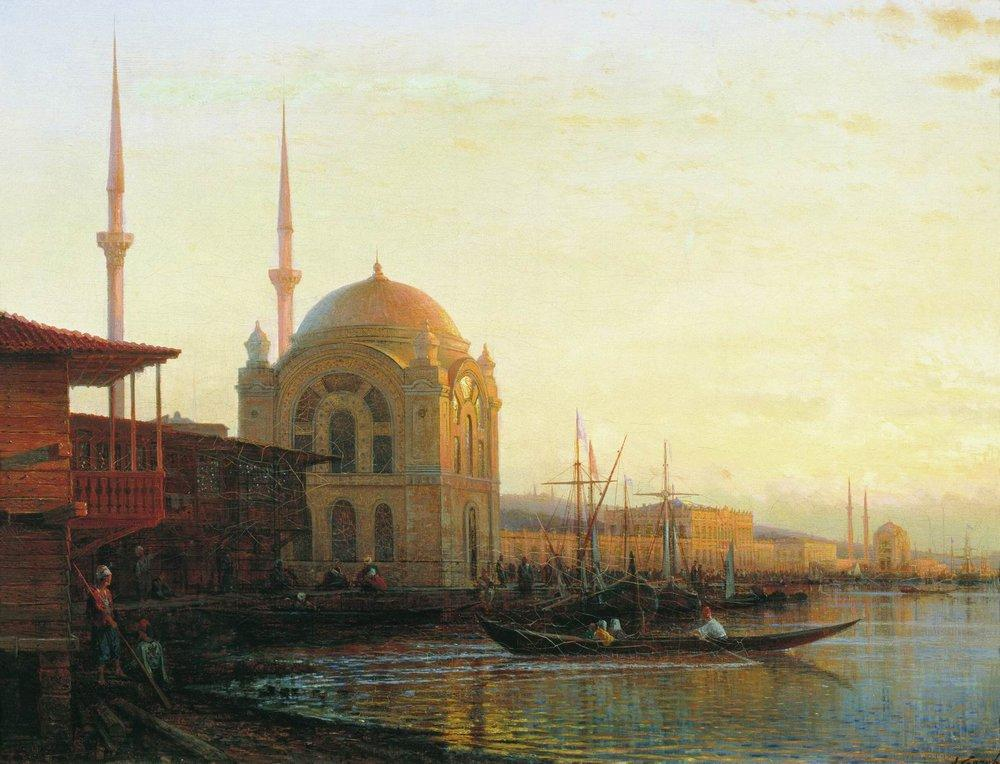
Mosque in Constantinople (1850s)

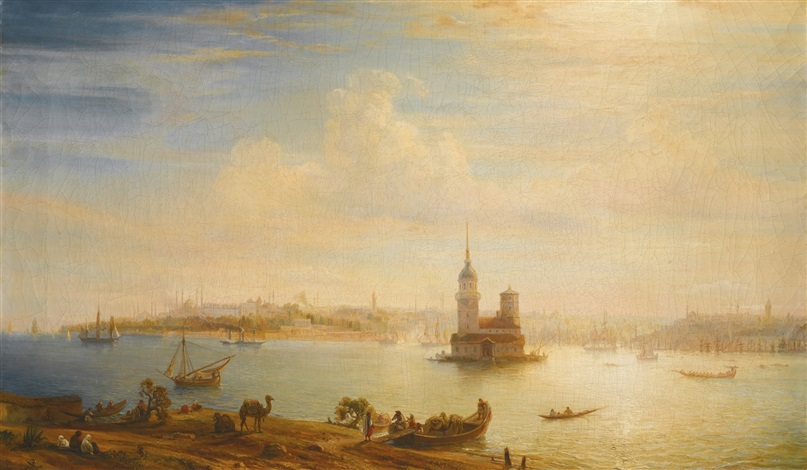
View of Constantinople, 1856

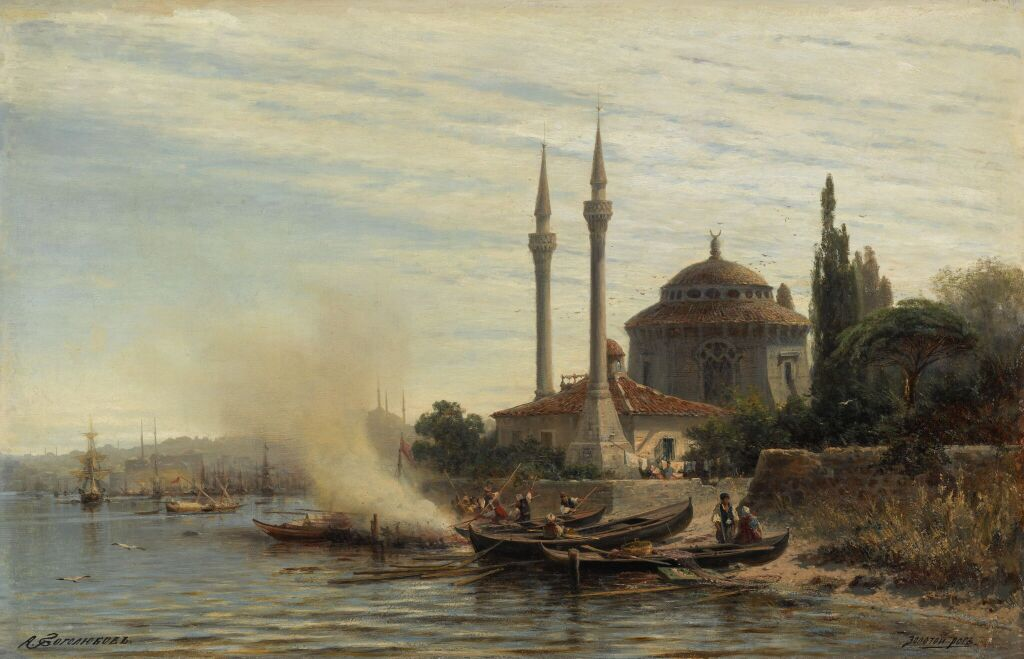
Golden Horn (Istanbul) 1864
Tretyakov Gallery

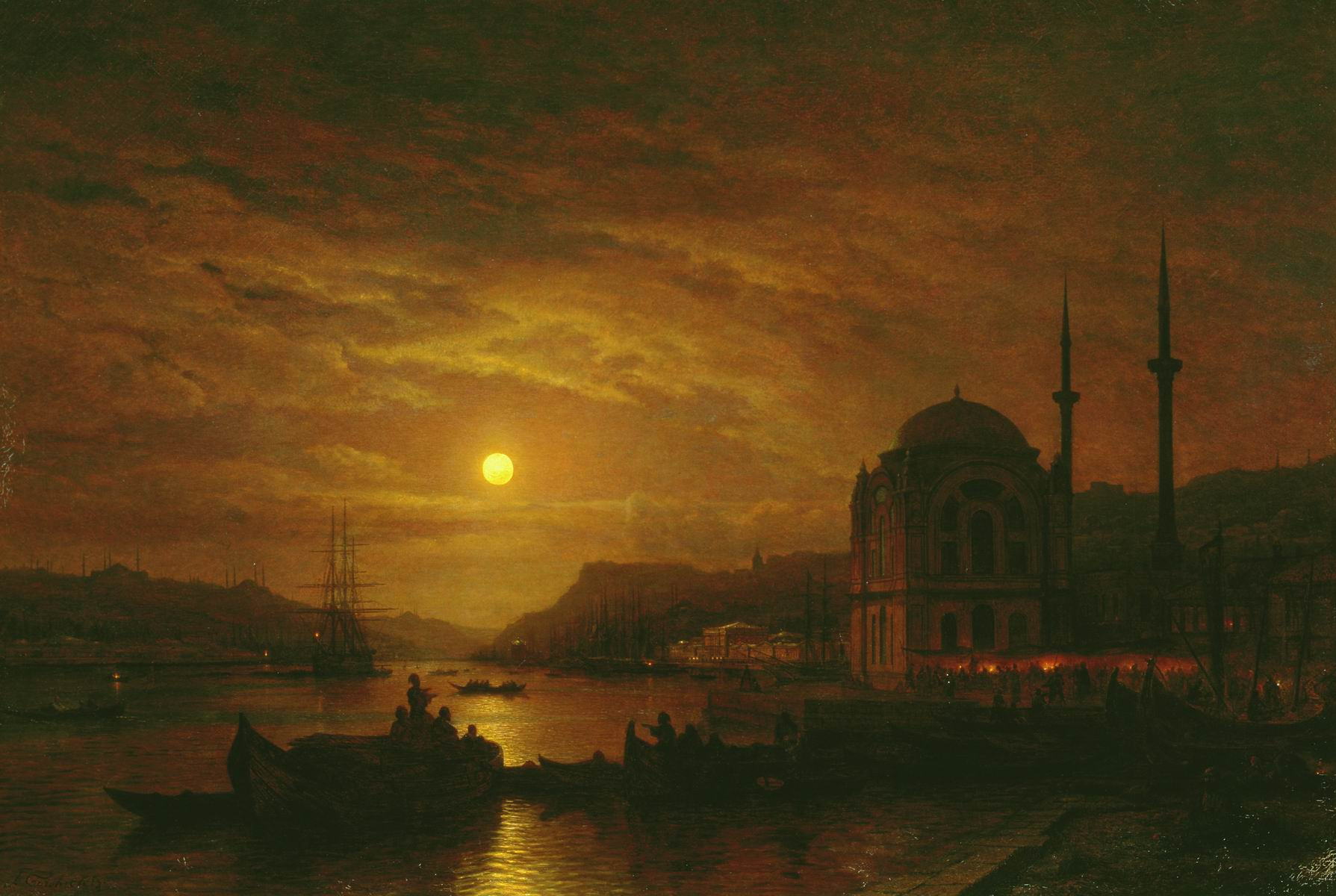
Moonlit evening in Constantinople

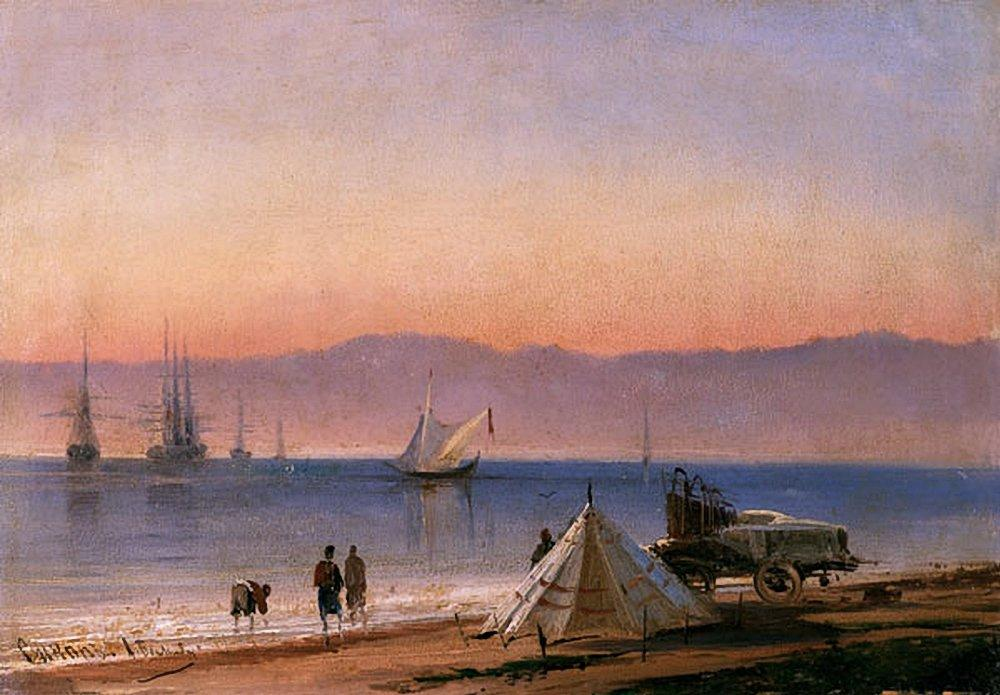
Sinop, Ottoman Turkey, 1856
Denmark

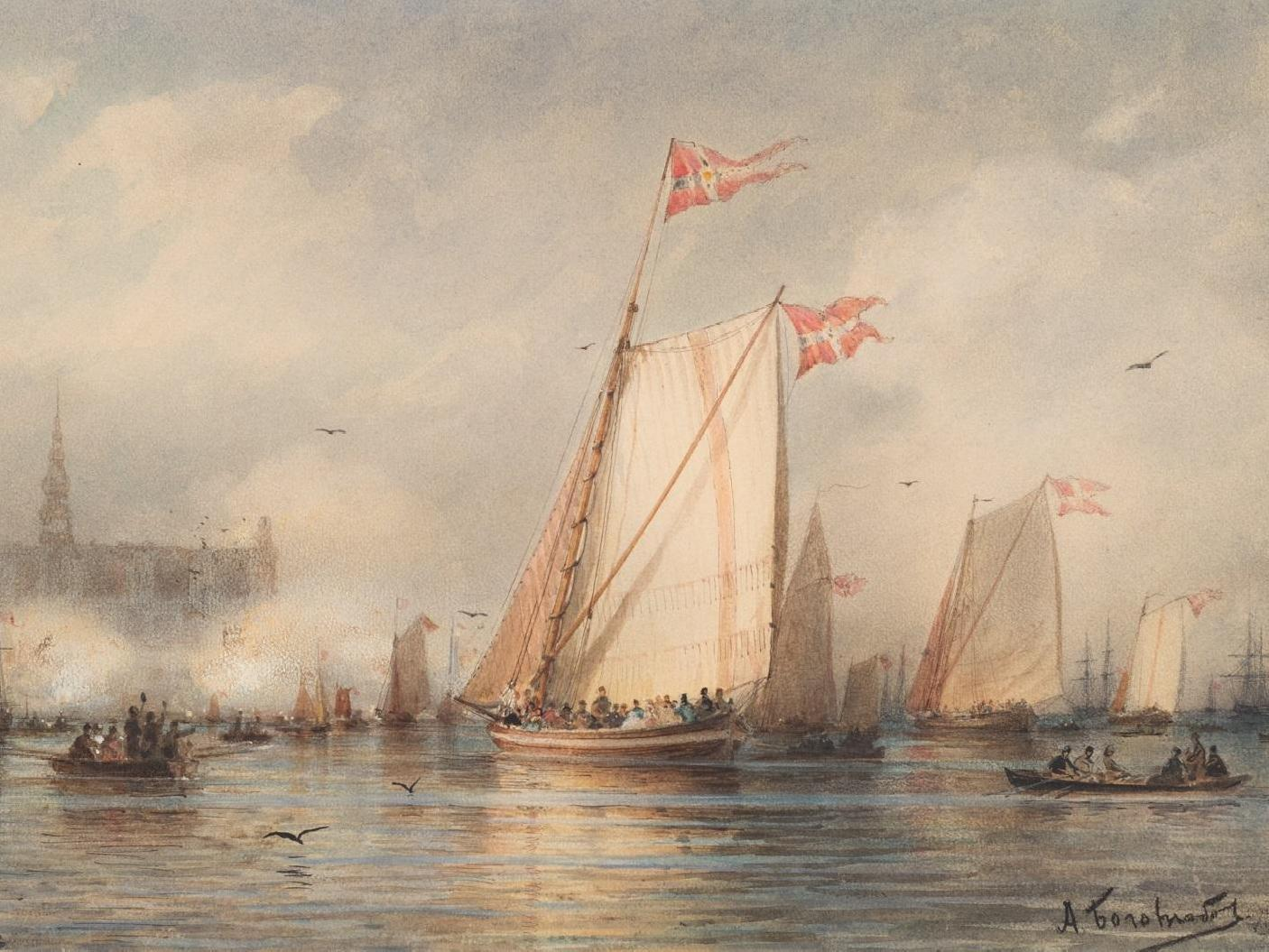
Yachts and Boats on the Water
The Russian Museum

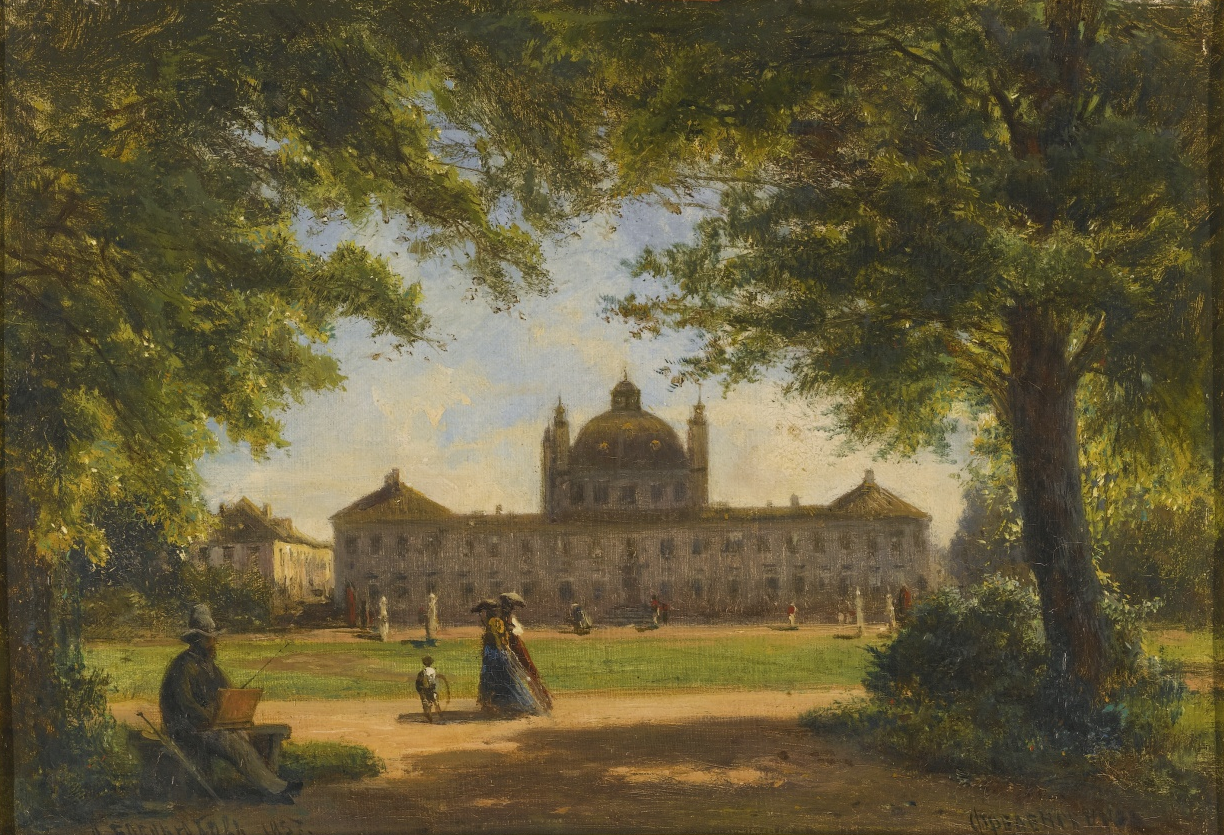
Fredensborg Palace of 1867

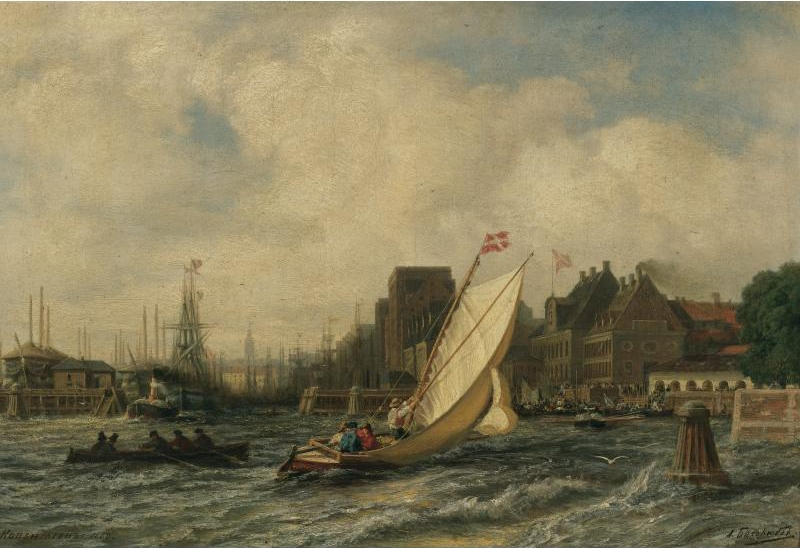
Copenhagen Harbor of 1868
Belgium

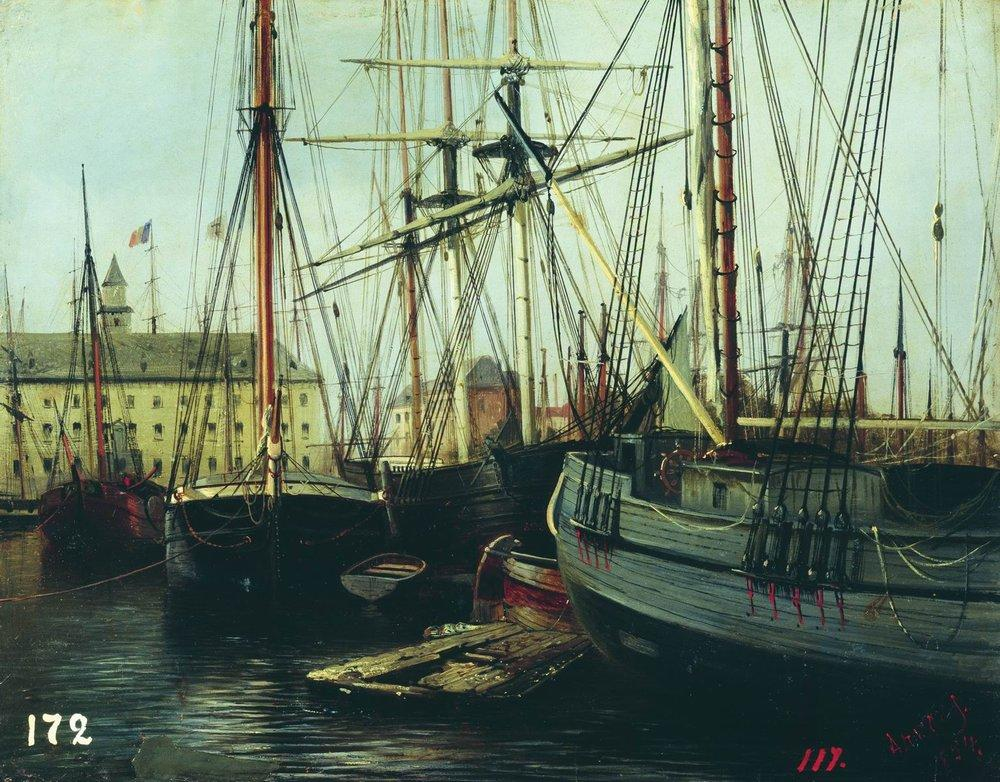
Antwerp, 1854
Switzerland

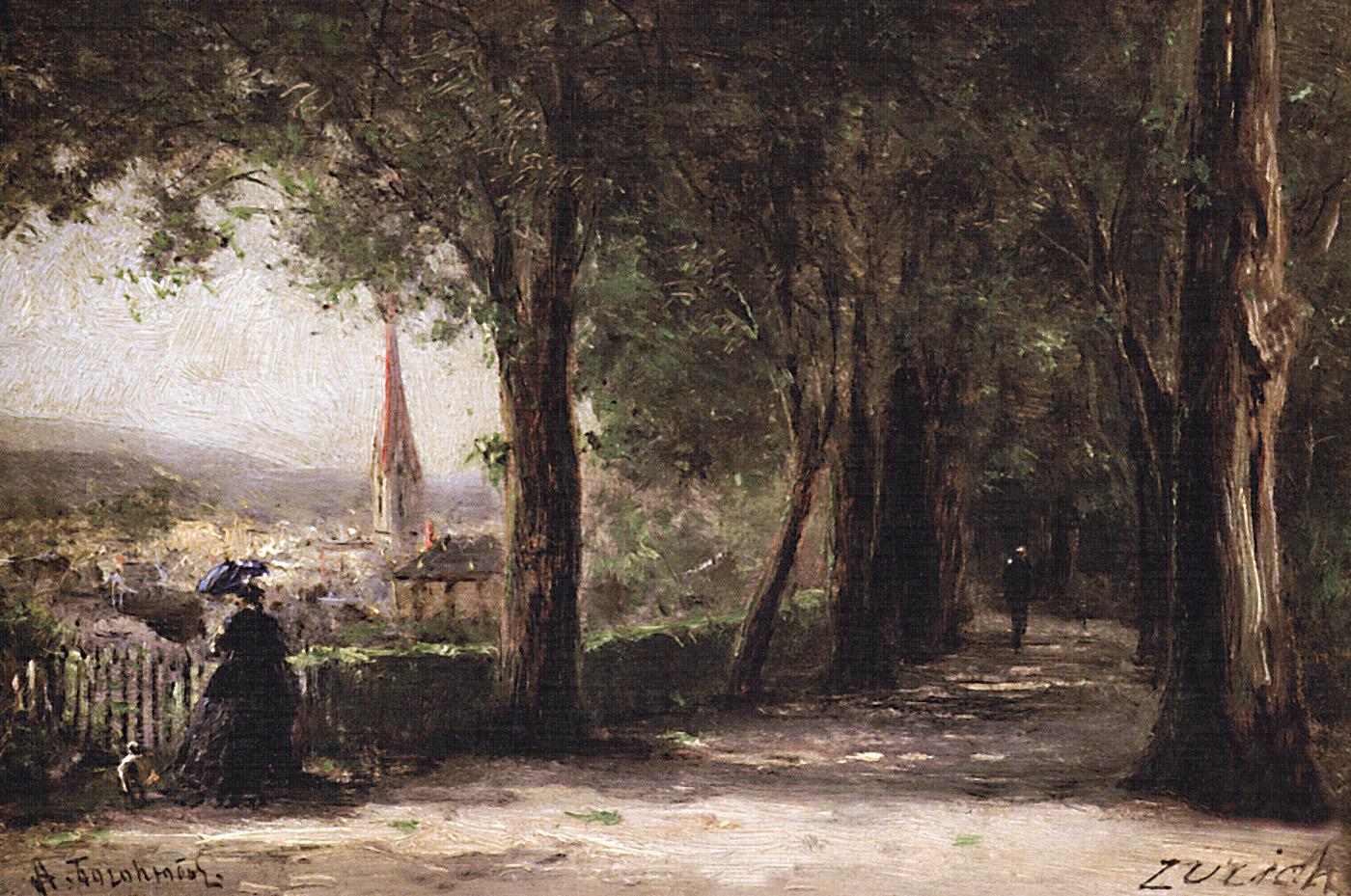
Alley in Zürich
Radishchev Art Museum

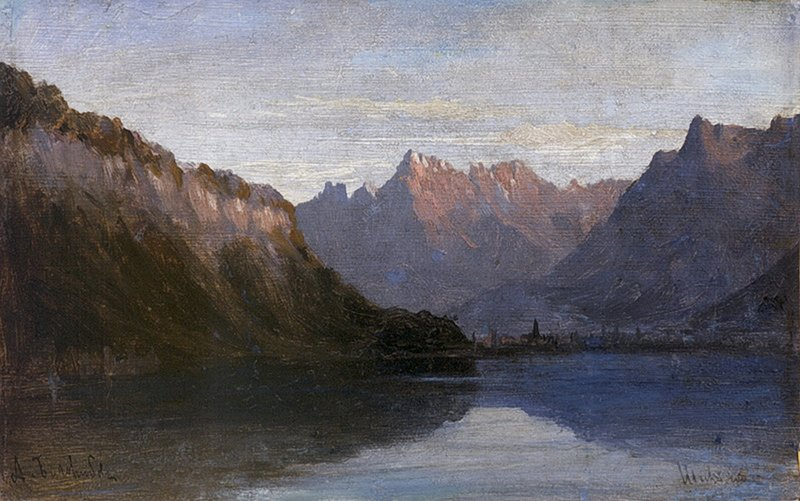
Lake Geneva (France, Switzerland)
Radishchev Art Museum

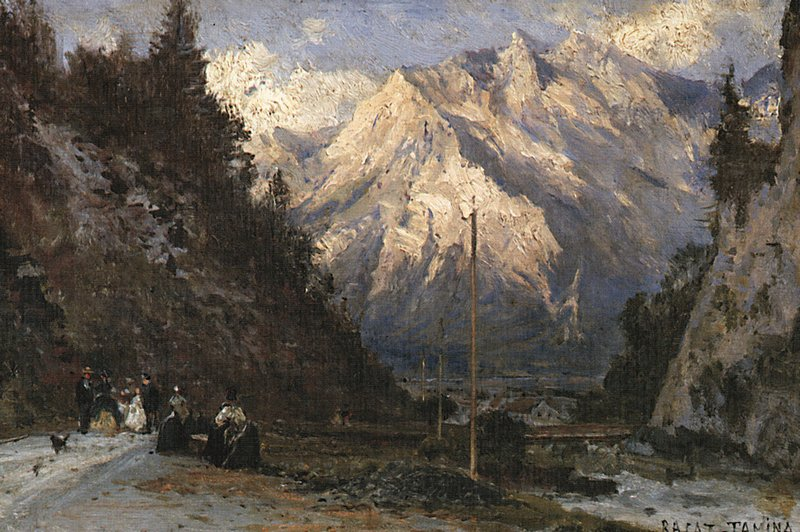
On the Tamina River, 1865
Radishchev Art Museum

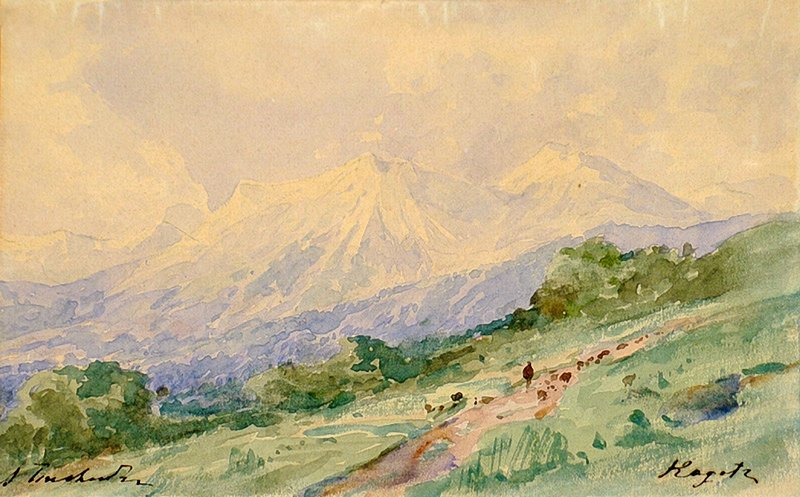
Bad Ragaz
Radishchev Art Museum
Netherlands

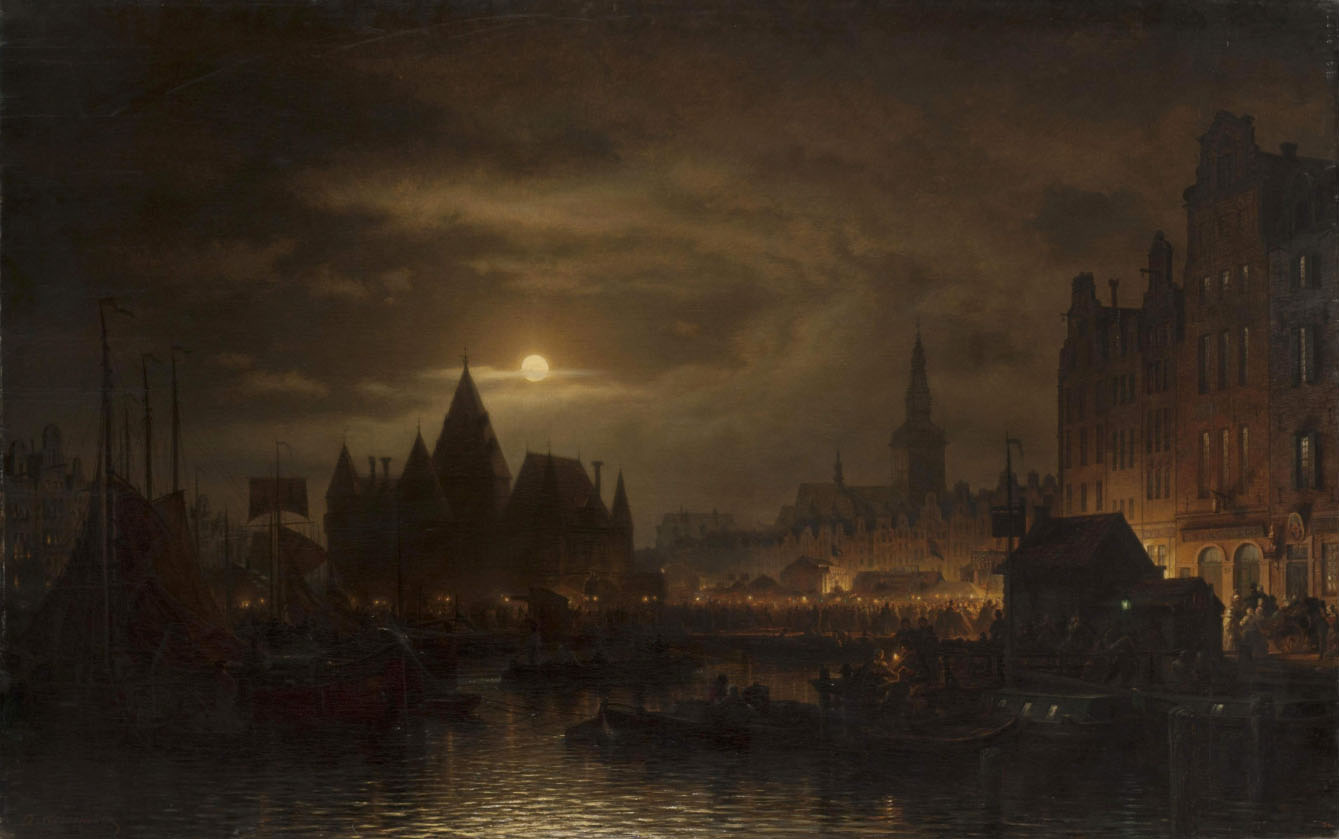
A Fair in Amsterdam c. 1859
The Russian Museum

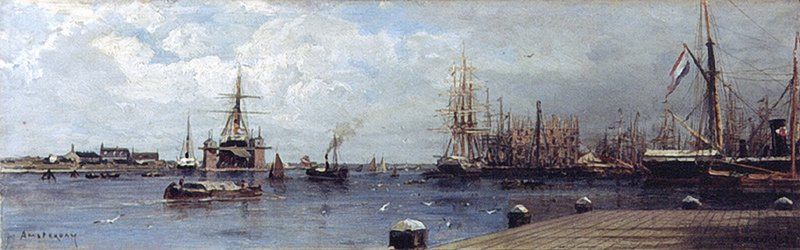
Amsterdam, 1885
Radishchev Art Museum

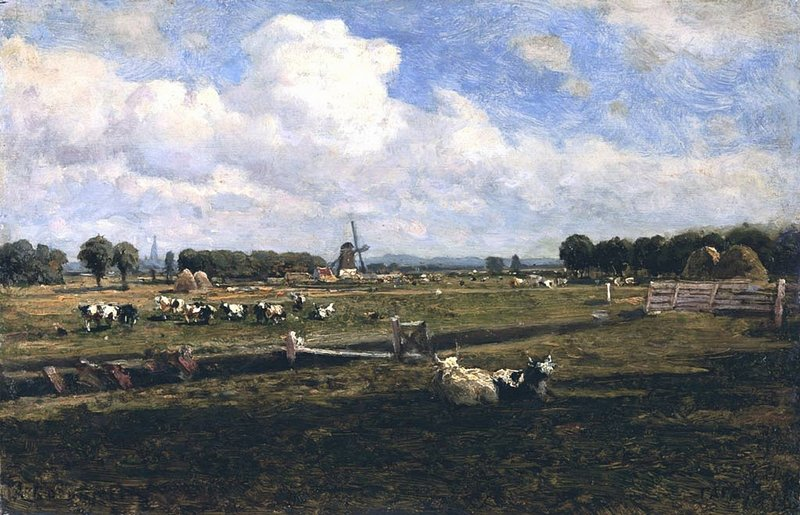
The Outskirts of The Hague, 1870 (The Netherlands)
Radishchev Art Museum

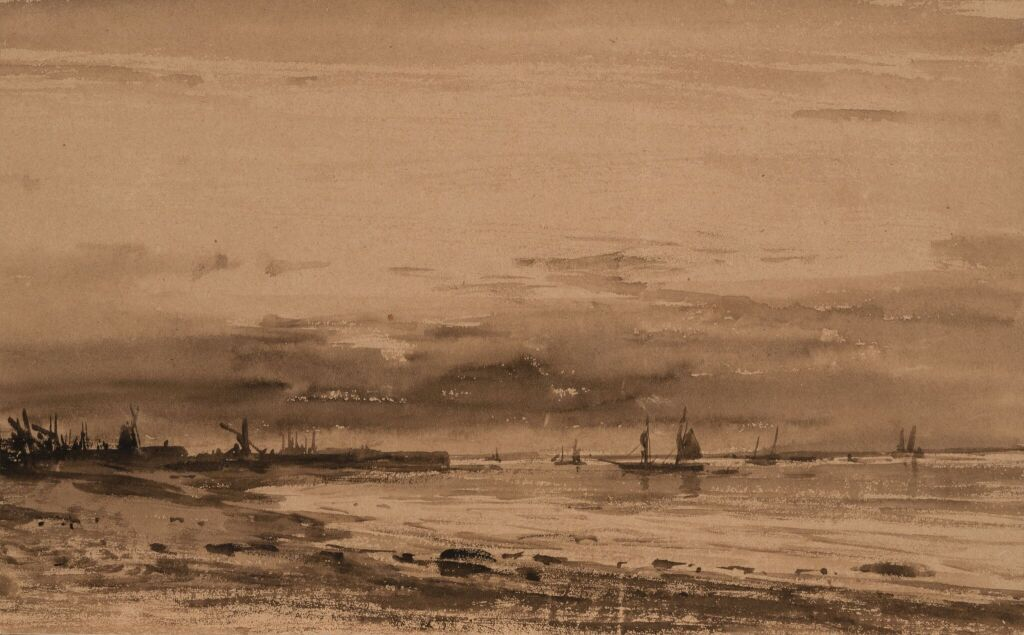
Katwijk in Holland (South Holland), 1870s
Tretyakov Gallery
Austria-Hungary

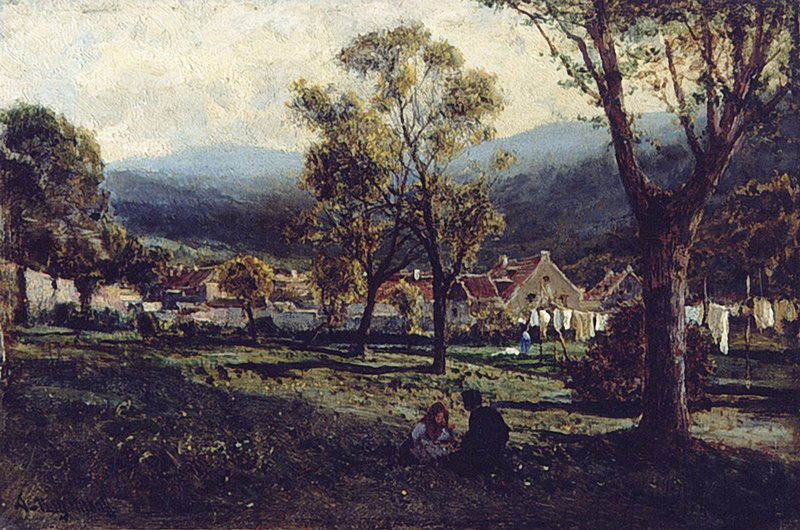
The Outskirts of Vienna (Austria-Hungary, 1873)
Radishchev Art Museum

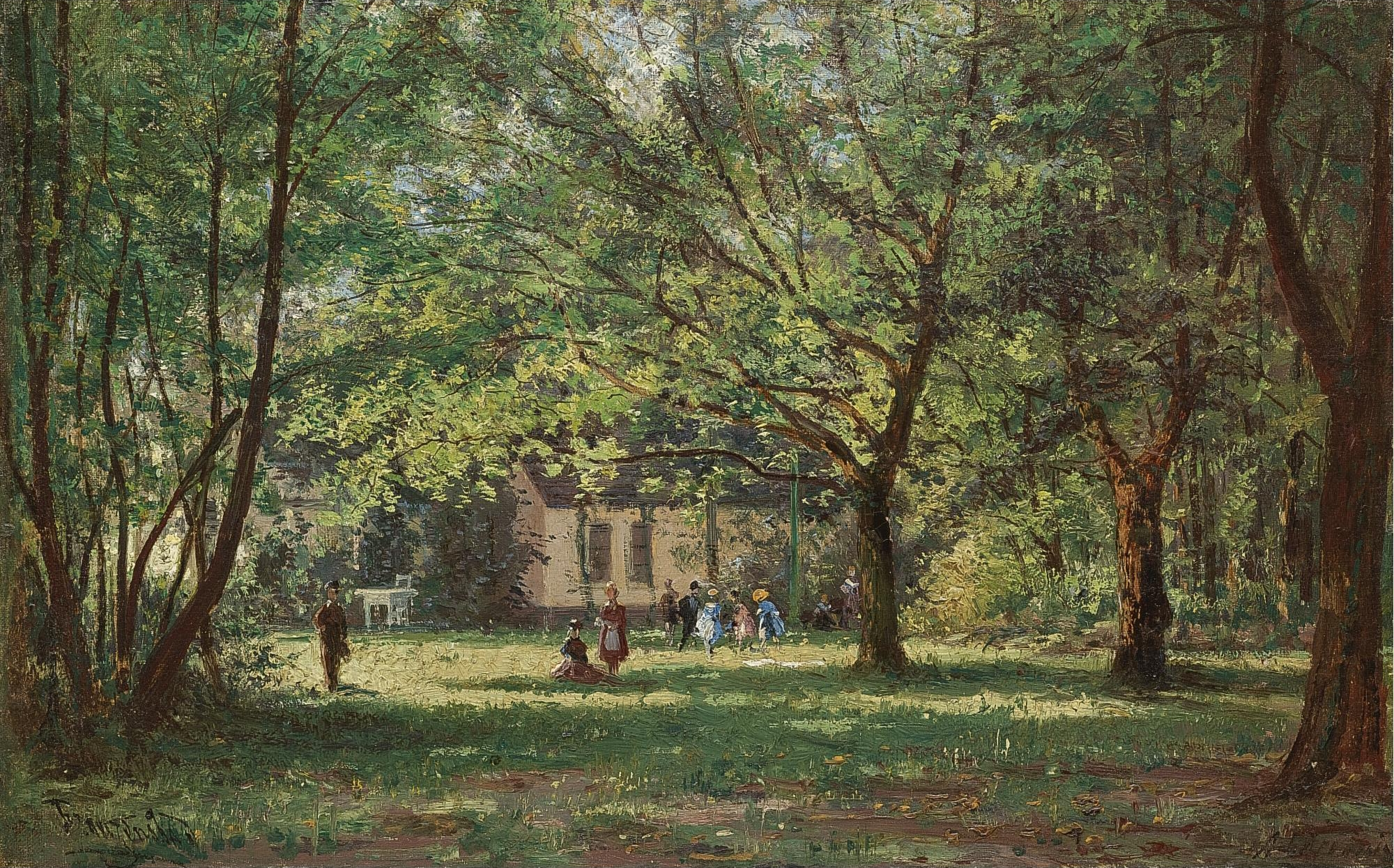
Franzensbad; Bohemia (Czechia)

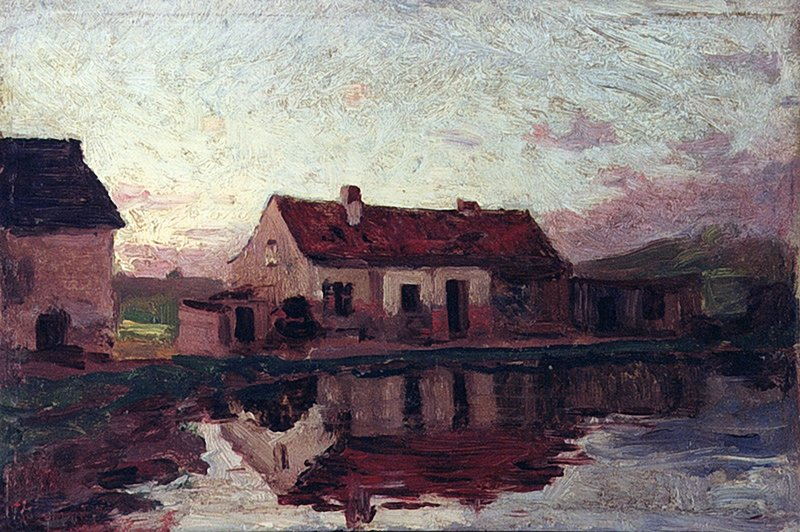
Franzensbad, 1873
Radishchev Art Museum
Monaco

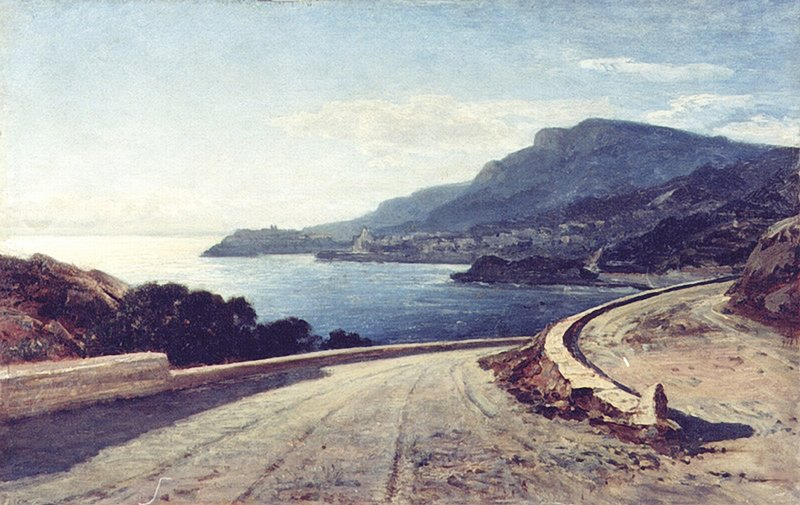
Monte Carlo, Monaco
Radishchev Art Museum
Germany

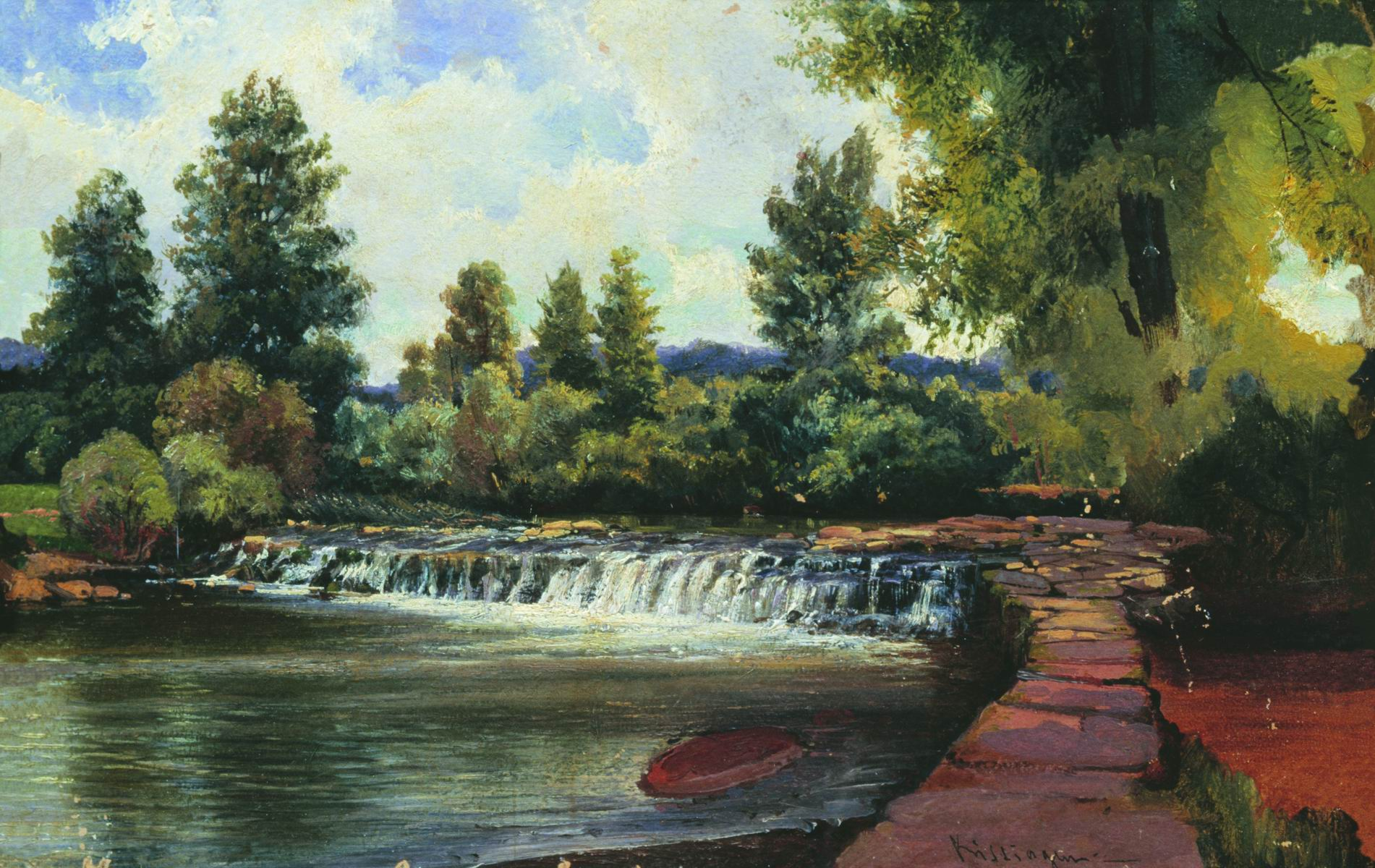
Bad Kissingen. Waterfall

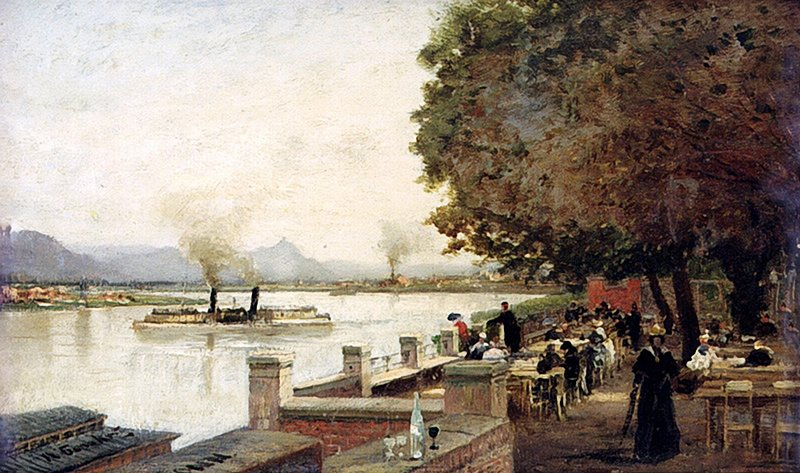
The Rhine in Bonn, Rhine Province
Radishchev Art Museum

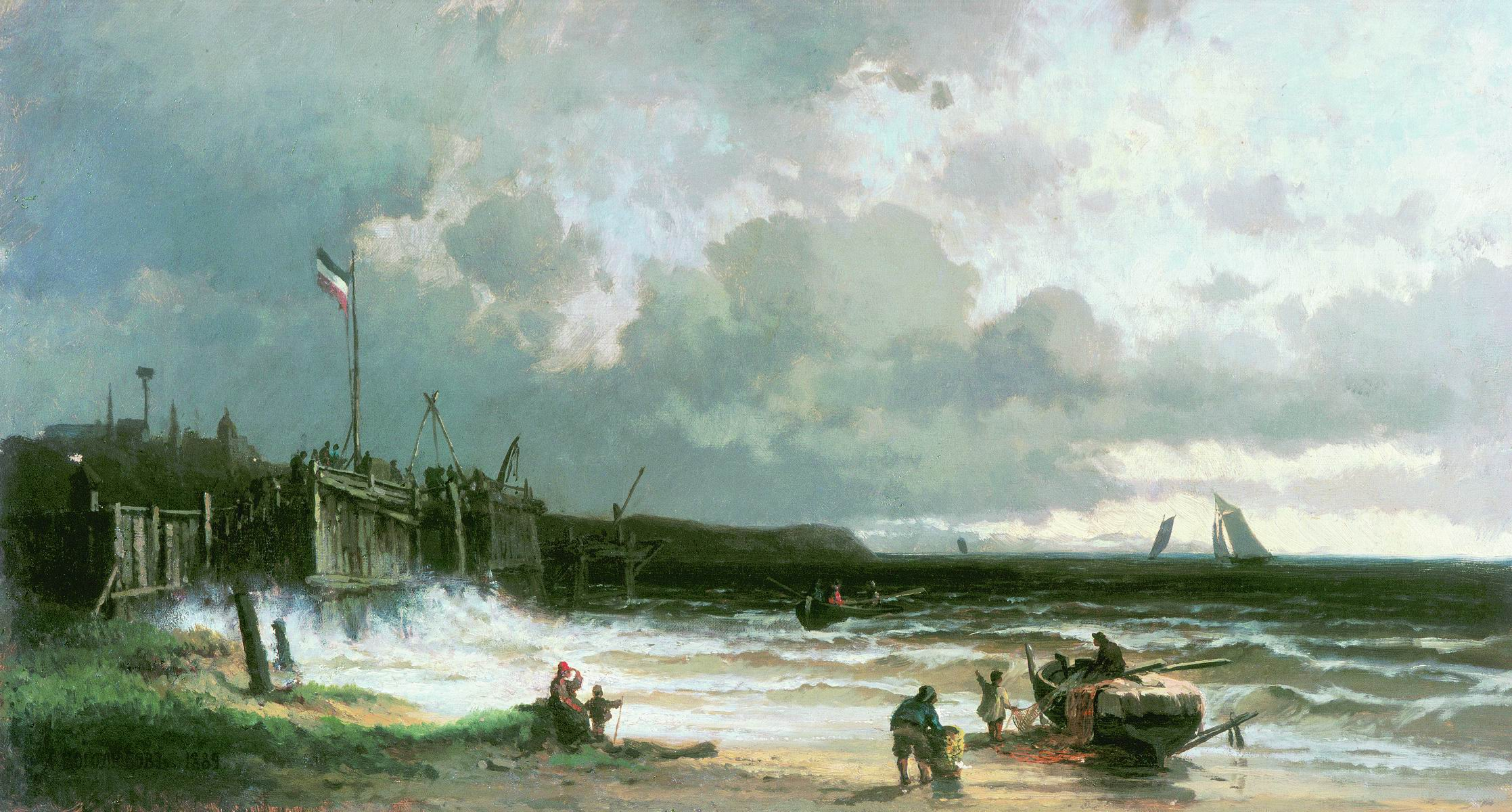
On the coast (German Empire, 1889)

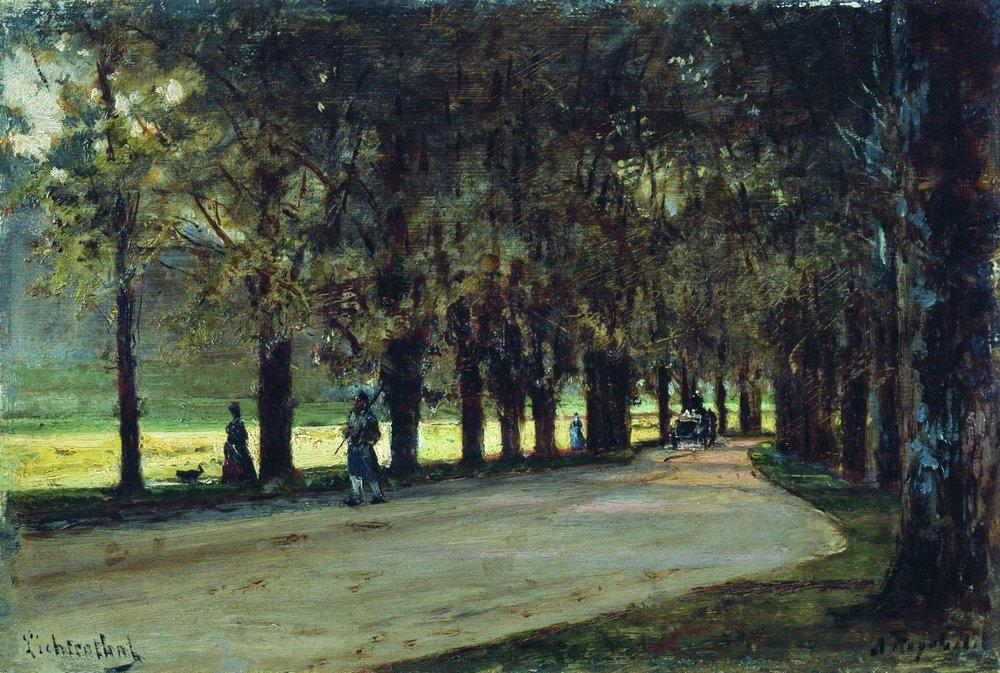
An alley in the park. Liechtenstein. 1889.
Bulgaria

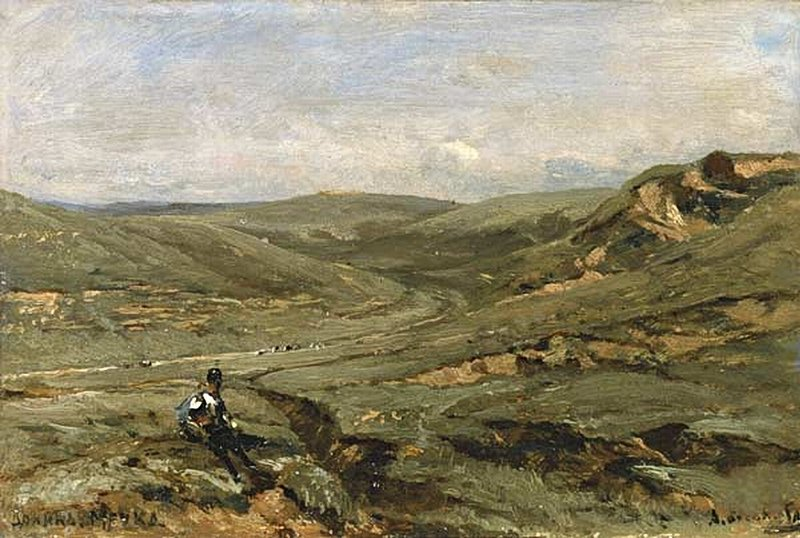
Valley in Bulgaria (1881)
Radishchev Art Museum
Unknown site

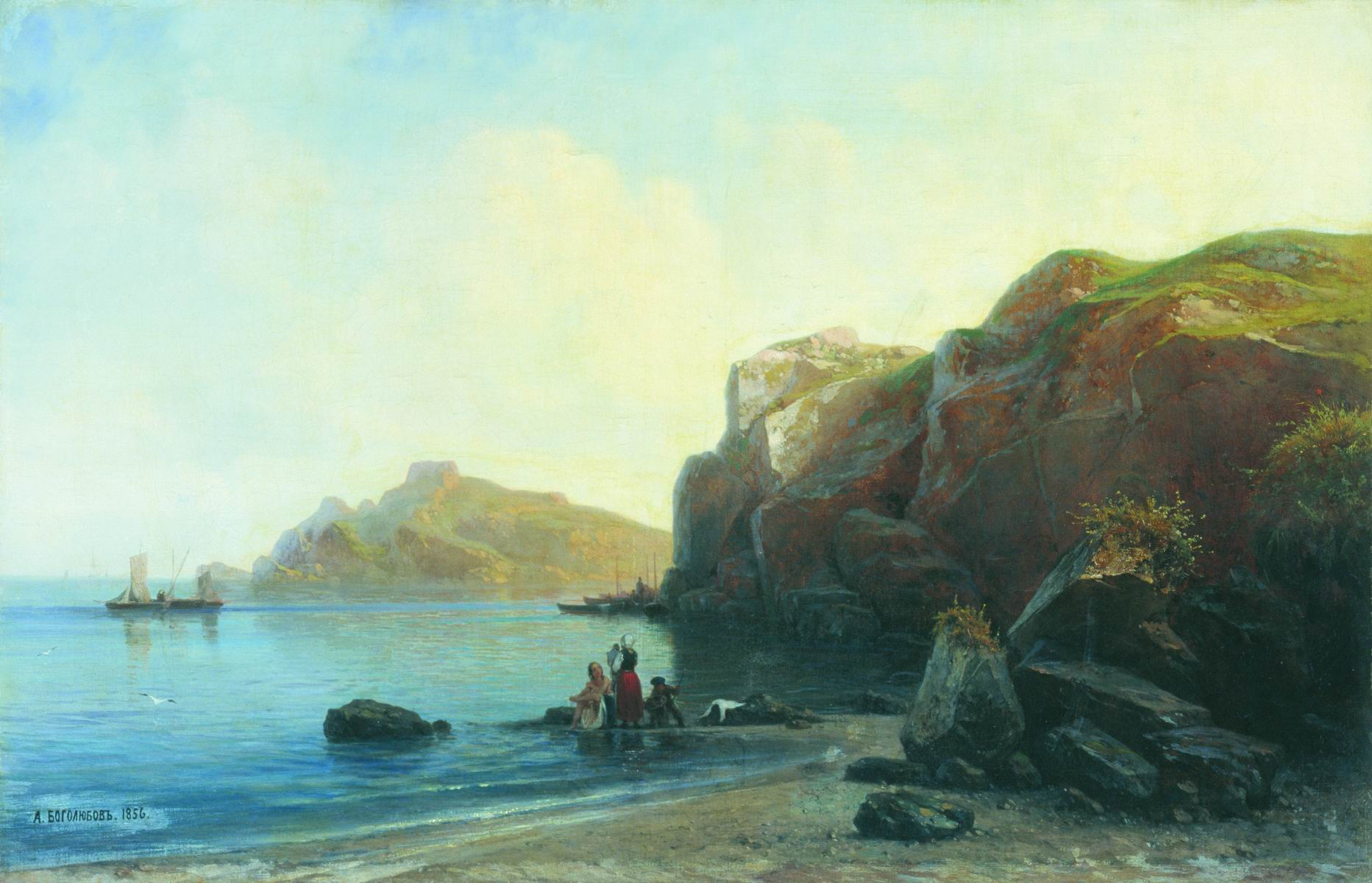
On the seashore, 1856

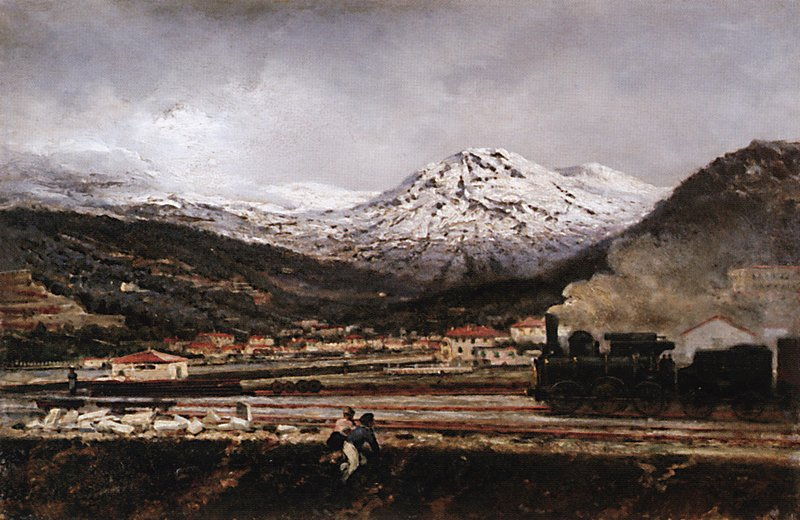
A Mountain Landscape, 1865
Radishchev Art Museum

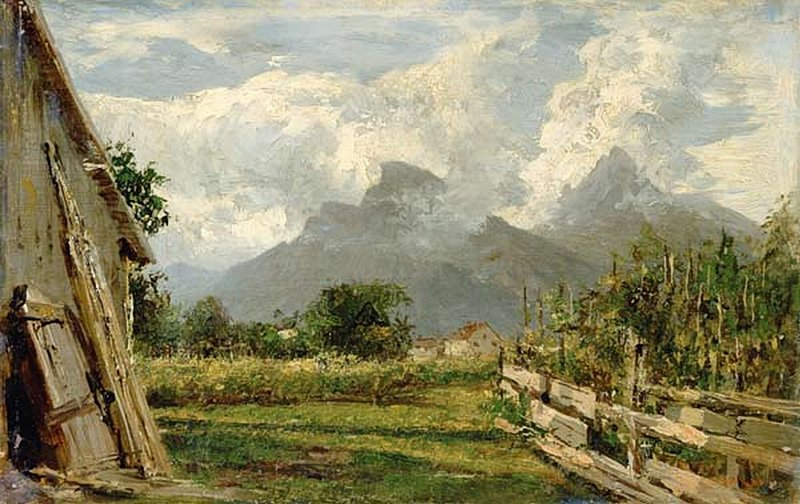
After the Rain (1865)
Radishchev Art Museum

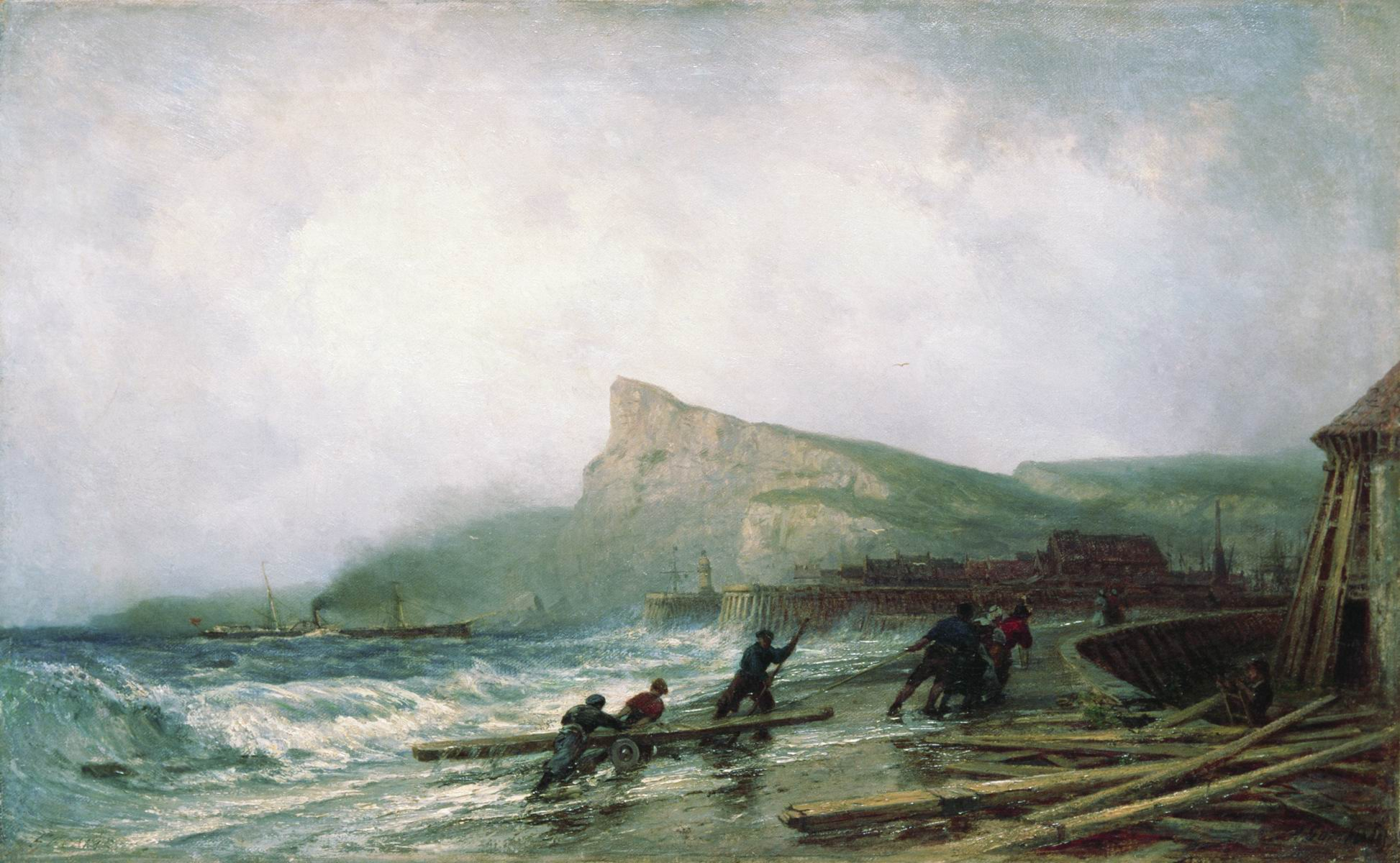
Dyke construction. 1870s
Private collection

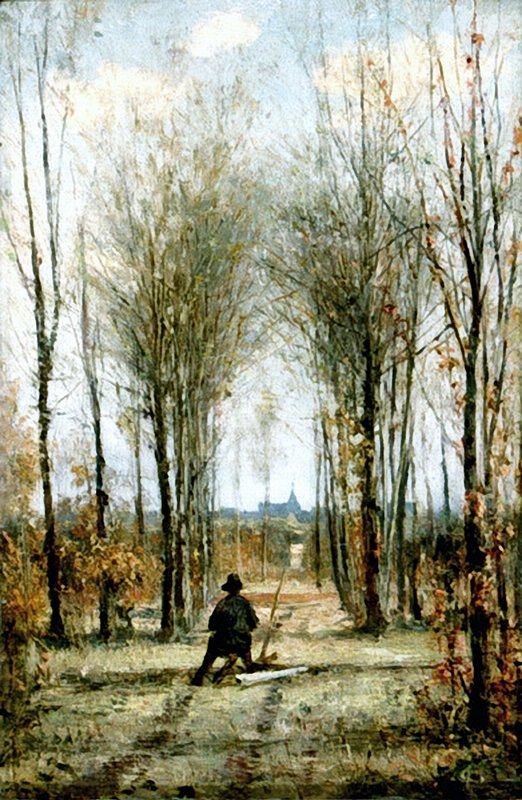
Autumn, 1879
Radishchev Art Museum

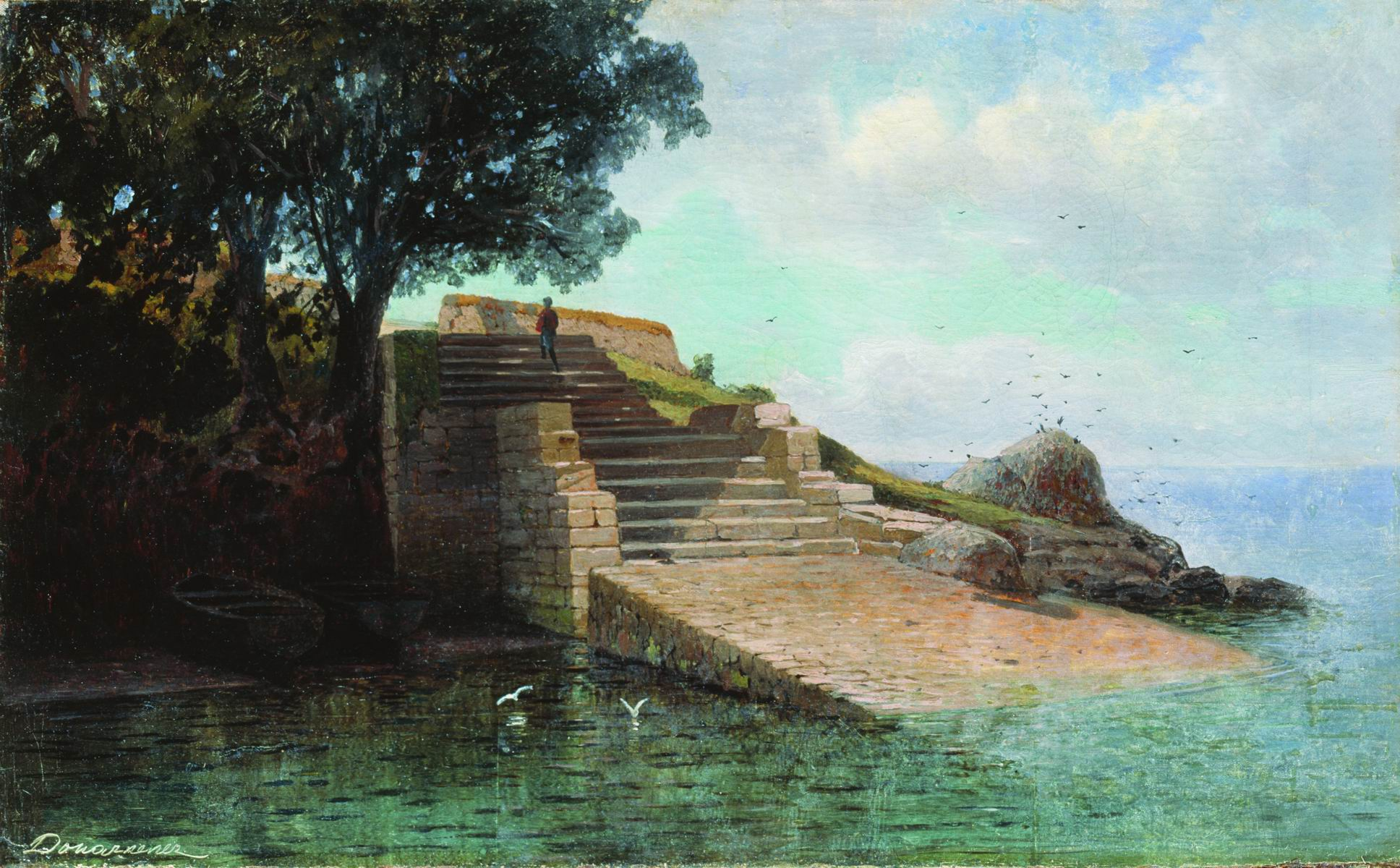
Marina (quay)
Portraiture

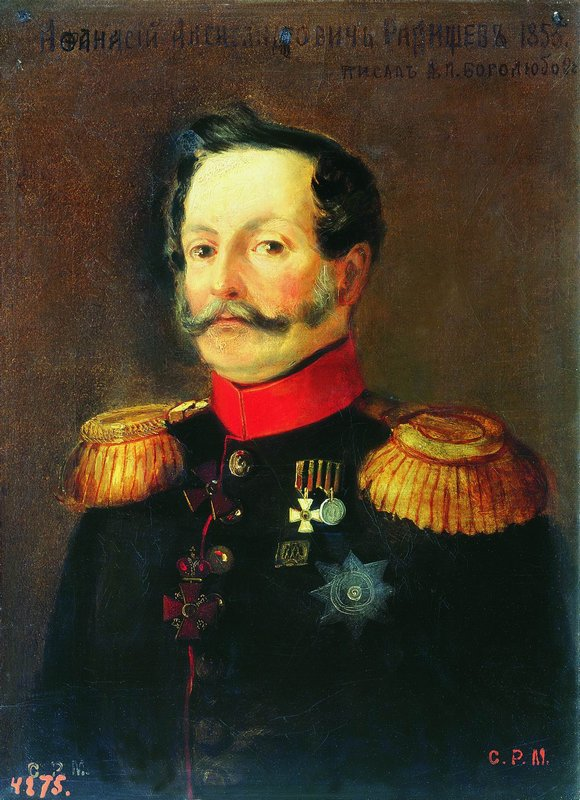
Afanasy Radishchev portrait of 1855
Radishchev Art Museum

== Publications ==
- Bogolyubov, Alexei P. (2019). Ogaryova, Nonna V. (ed.). Записки моряка-художника (in Russian). Samara: Agni. ISBN 978-5-6043148-0-7.
