= Procession =

Organized body of people walking in a formal or ceremonial manner

A procession is an organized body of people walking in a formal or ceremonial manner. A procession may be arranged for a variety of purposes, including to advertise something, signal a change in government, display a group's power, show solidarity for a cause, mark the beginning or end of an event such as a wedding or funeral, entertain a crowd, or practice a religion. Processions have been an aspect of celebrations and ceremonies since ancient times, and they are practiced in some form throughout all cultures. They often involve a mode of transport, such as a carriage or a car; music or vocalizations, including a choir or a marching band; a visual signal of a hierarchy within the precession; and the display of eye-catching items like banners.

The recession at the close of the offering of the Mass at Vadstena Abbey Church (Evangelical-Lutheran) in Sweden

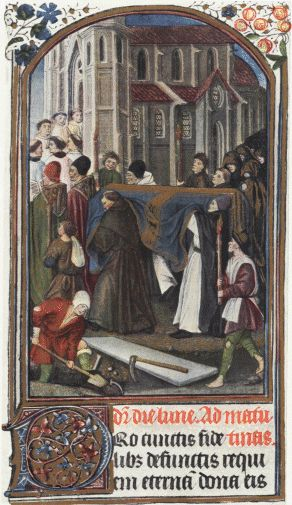
A funeral procession, illustrated in a manuscript of the Hours of the Virgin. Fifteenth century. British Library, Add MS 27697.

== History ==
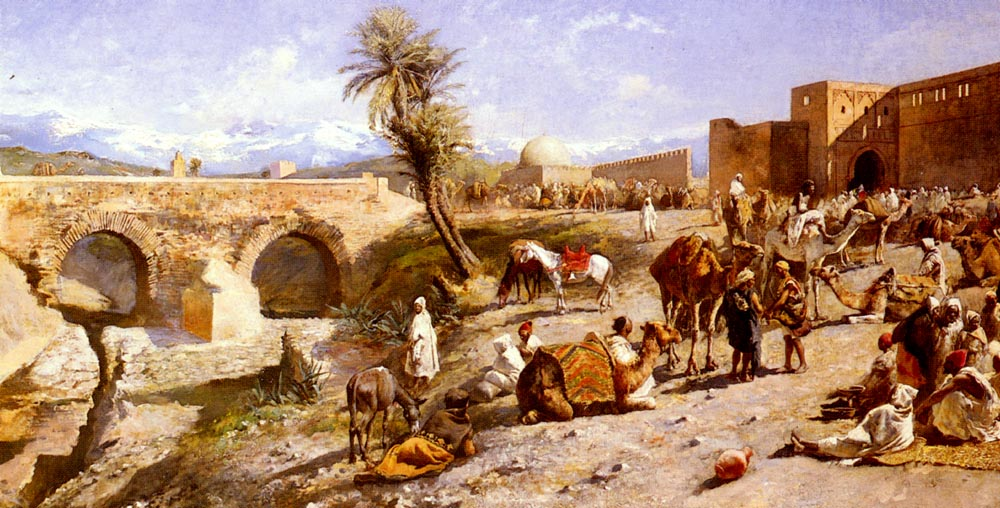
A royal procession

Processions have in all peoples and at all times been a natural form of public celebration, as forming an orderly and impressive ceremony. Religious and triumphal processions are abundantly illustrated by ancient monuments, e.g. the religious processions of Egypt, those illustrated by the rock-carvings of Boghaz-Keui, the many representations of processions in Greek art, culminating in the great Panathenaic procession of the Parthenon Frieze, and Roman triumphal reliefs, such as those of the arch of Titus.

=== Greco-Roman practice ===
Processions played a prominent part in the great festivals of Greece, where they were always religious in character. The games were either opened or accompanied by more or less elaborate processions and sacrifices, while processions from the earliest times formed part of the worship of the old nature gods, as those connected with the cult of Dionysus and the Phallic processions, and later formed an essential part of the celebration of the great religious festivals (e.g. the processions of the Thesmophoria, and that of the Great Dionysia), and of the mysteries (e.g. the great procession from Athens to Eleusis, in connection with the Eleusinia).

The most prominent of the Roman processions was that of the Triumph, which had its origin in the return of a victorious army headed by their general, who accompanied by the army, captives, spoils, the chief magistrate, priests bearing the images of the gods, amidst strewing of flowers, burning of incense and the like (Ovid, Trist. iv. 2, 3 and 6), proceeded in great pomp from the Campus to the Capitol to offer sacrifice.

Connected with the triumph was the pompa circensis, or solemn procession that preceded the games in the circus. It first came into use at the Ludi Romani, when the games were preceded by a great procession from the Capitol to the Circus. The praetor or consul who appeared in the ponipa circensis wore the robes of a triumphing general (see Mommsen, Staatsrec/zt I. 397 for the connection of the triumph with the ludi). Thus, when it became customary for the consul to celebrate games at the opening of the consular year, he came, under the empire, to appear in triumphal robes in the processus consularis, or procession of the consul to the Capitol to sacrifice to Jupiter.

=== Christian practice ===
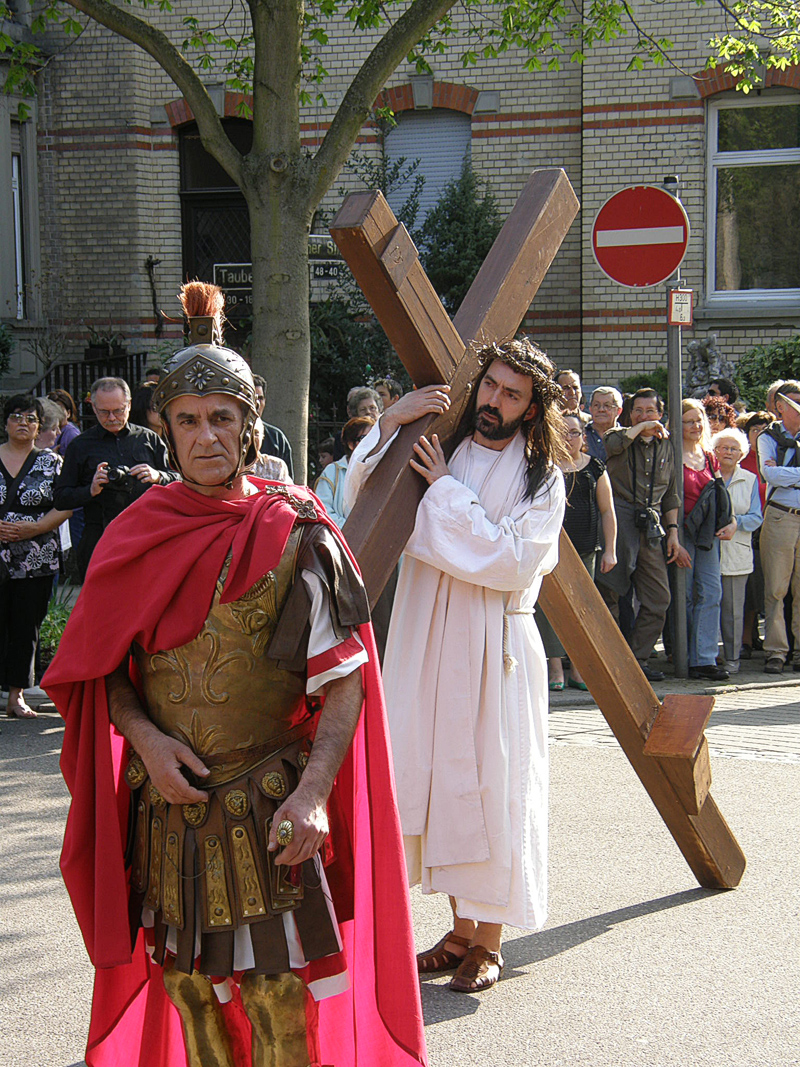
Christian Easter passion procession in Stuttgart, Germany (detail)

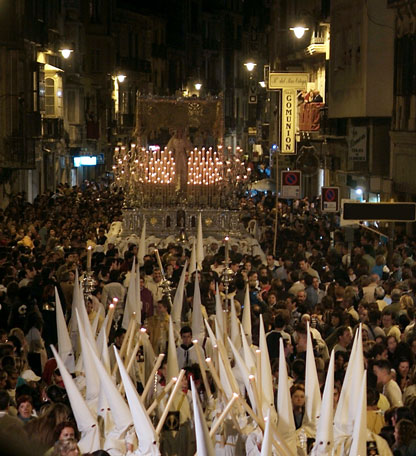
Christian Easter procession in Malaga, Spain

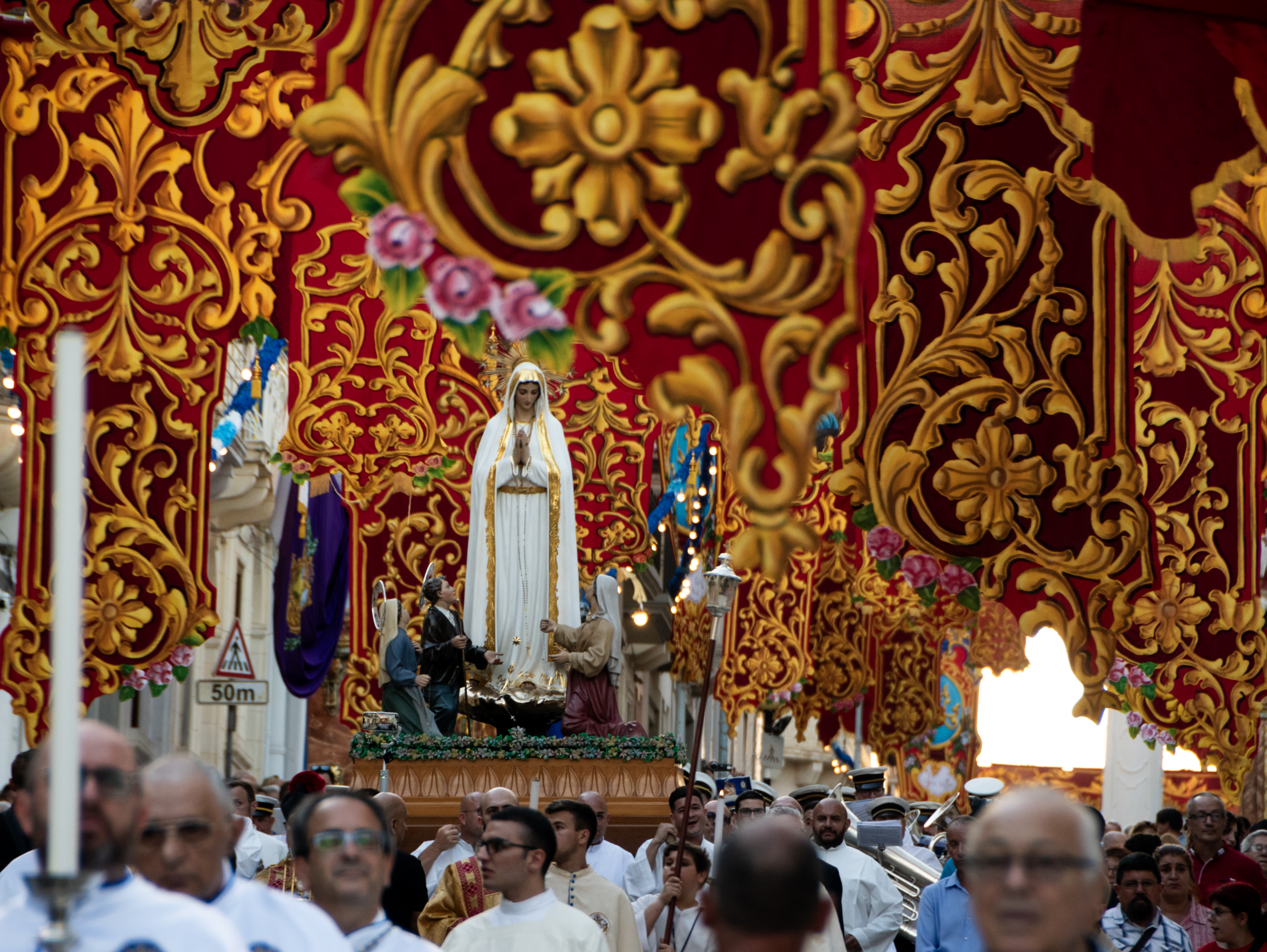
Procession of Our Lady of Fátima in Gwardamanġa, Malta

==== Early ====
After the ascendency of Christianity in the Roman Empire, the consular processions in Constantinople retained their religious character, now proceeding to Hagia Sophia, where prayers and offerings were made; but in Rome, where Christianity was not so widely spread among the upper classes, at first the tendency was to convert the procession into a purely civil function, omitting the pagan rites and prayers, without substituting Christian ones.

Only after Theodosius did the processions become a religious event, replete with icons, crosses, and banners. There were other local processions connected with the primitive worship of the country people, which remained unchanged, but they were eventually overshadowed by the popular piety of the Church. Such were those of the Ambarvalia, Robigalia, which were essentially rustic festivals, lustrations of the fields, consisting in a procession round the spot to be purified, leading the sacrificial victims with prayers, hymns, and ceremonies to protect the young crops from evil influence.

Tertullian (2nd century) uses processio and procedere in the sense of to go out, appear in public, and, as applied to a church function, processio was first used in the same way as collecta, i.e. for the assembly of the people in a church. In this sense it appears to be used by Pope Leo I, while in the version by Dionysius Exiguus of the 17th canon of the Council of Laodicea (about 363–364) Ancient Greek: σονάξεσι, is translated by processionibus.

For the processions that formed part of the ritual of the Eucharist, those of the introit, the gospel and the oblation, the earliest records date from the 6th century and even later, but they evidently were established at a much earlier date. As to public processions, these seem to have come into rapid vogue after the recognition of Christianity as the religion of the empire. Those at Jerusalem would seem to have been long established when described by the author of the Peregrinatio Sylviae towards the end of the 4th century.

Very early were the processions accompanied by hymns and prayers, known as litaniae, rogationes or supplicationes. It is to such a procession that reference appears to be made in a letter of St Basil, which would thus be the first recorded mention of a public Christian procession. The first mention for the Western Church occurs in St Ambrose. In both these cases the litanies are stated to have been long in use. There is also mention of a procession accompanied by hymns, organized at Constantinople by St John Chrysostom (c. 390–400) in opposition to a procession of Arians, in Sozomen.

Some liturgists maintain that the early Church in its processions followed Old Testament precedents, quoting such cases as the procession of the Ark of the Covenant round the walls of Jericho, the procession of David with the Ark, the processions of thanksgiving on the return from captivity, &c. The liturgy of the early Church as Duchesne shows was influenced by that of the Jewish synagogue, but the theory that the Church's processions were directly related to the Old Testament ritual is of later origin.

In times of calamity penitential processions were held, in which the people walked in robes of penitence, fasting, barefooted, and, in later times, frequently dressed in black (litaniae nigrae). The cross was carried at the head of the procession and often the gospel and the relics of the saint were carried. Gregory of Tours gives numerous instances of such litanies in time of calamity; thus he describes a procession of the clergy and people round the city, in which relics of St Remigius were carried and litanies chanted in order to avert the plague. So, too, Gregory the Great writes to the Sicilian bishops to hold processions to prevent a threatened invasion of Sicily. A famous instance of these penitential litanies is the litania septiformis ordered by Gregory the Great in the year 590, when Rome had been inundated and pestilence had followed. In this litany seven processions, of clergy, laymen, monks, nuns, matrons, the poor, and children respectively, starting from seven different churches, proceeded to hear mass at St. Maria Maggiore. This litany has often been confused with the litania major, introduced at Rome in 598 (vide supra), but is quite distinct from it.

Funeral processions, accompanied with singing and the carrying of lighted tapers, were very early customary (see ceremonial use of lights), and akin to these, also very early, were the processions connected with the translation of the relics of martyrs from their original burying place to the church where they were to be enshrined. From the time of the emperor Constantine I these processions were of great magnificence.

Festivals involving processions were adopted by the Catholic Church from the pre-Christian Roman festive calendar. The litaniae majores et minores, which are stated by Hermann Usener to have been first instituted by Pope Liberius (352-366). It is generally acknowledged that they are the equivalent of the Catholic Church of the Roman lustrations of the crops in spring, the Ambarvalia, &c. The litania major, or great procession on St Mark's day (April 25) is shown to coincide both in date and ritual with the Roman Robigalia, which took place ad. vii. Kal. Mai., and consisted in a procession leaving Rome by the Flaminian gate, and proceeding by way of the Milvian bridge to a sanctuary at the 5th milestone of the Via Claudia, where the flamen quirinalis sacrificed a dog and a sheep to avert blight (robigo) from the crops. The litania major followed the same route as far as the Milvian bridge, when it turned off and returned to St Peter's, where mass was celebrated. This was already established as an annual festival by 598, as is shown by a document of Gregory the Great that inculcates the duty of celebrating litaniam, quae major ab omnibus appellatur. The litaniae minores or rogations, held on the three days preceding Ascension Day, were first introduced into Gaul by Bishop Mamertus of Vienne (c. 470), and made binding for all Gaul by the First Council of Orléans (511). The litaniae minores were also adopted for these three days in Rome by Pope Leo III (c. 800).

A description of the institution and character of the Ascensiontide rogations is given by Sidonius Apollinaris. The solemnity of these, he says, was first established by Mamertus. Hitherto they had been erratic, lukewarm, and poorly attended (vagae, tepentes, infrequentesque). Those he instituted were characterized by fasting, prayers, psalms, and tears. In the Ambrosian rite the rogations take place after Ascension, and in the Spanish on the Thursday to Saturday after Whitsuntide, and in November (Synod of Girona, 517).

==== Baroque Catholicism and Evangelical-Lutheranism ====
The element of ritual was prominent in early modern Catholicism. There were processions to commemorate almost all the holiday. Though 18th-century Church reformers made strides to simplify the liturgical year and its complex web of holidays, festivals and processions, these practices remained as essential to Catholic ritual traditions in 1750 as they had been in the 15th century. After 1650 the number of processions was on the rise as processions became as essential to the observance of feast days as the Mass. Some processions were tied to agricultural lifestyles, while others were pilgrimages to shrines and holy places, or to develop ties with other parishes.

During the Reformation, the liturgical year was central to the liturgical practices of Catholicism, and remained as such in Evangelical-Lutheranism. Beginning with the Christmas season (from Advent to Epiphany) and followed by the feasts of Easter, Passiontide and Pentecost, Trinity Sunday and the Feast of Corpus Christi. In the early 18th century there were eleven processions of note at the village of Ettenkirch (near Lake Constance). These processions could travel to destinations as far as two hours away. Monthly processions took place around the Church, and on All Souls' Day and Palm Sunday. Corpus Christi was one of the most elaborate. The use of processions continued in Evangelical-Lutheranism after the Reformation, though they were not common in the Reformed Churches. In the Evangelical-Lutheran Churches, processions accompanied various liturgical rites, such as funerals. The Catholic and Evangelical-Lutheran practice of processions was contrasted with the practice of the Reformed Churches:

The stern simplicity of Calvinism, indeed, would not tolerate religious processions of any kind, and from the Reformed Churches they vanished altogether. ... The Lutheran practice has varied at different times and in different countries. Thus, according to the Württemberg Kirchenordnung of 1553, a funeral procession was prescribed, the bier being followed by the congregation singing hymns; the Brandenburg Kirchenordnung (1540) directed a cross-bearer to precede the procession and lighted candles to be carried, and this was prescribed also by the Waldeck Kirchenordnung of 1556. At present funeral processions survive in general only in the country districts; the processional cross or crucifix is still carried. In some provinces also the Lutheran Church has retained the ancient rogation processions in the week before Whitsuntide and, in some cases, in the month of May or on special occasions (e.g. days of humiliation, Busstage), processions about the fields to ask a blessing on the crops. On these occasions the ancient litanies are still used.

An outdoor Evangelical-Lutheran procession at Vadstena Abbey Church, Sweden

Procession during an Evangelical-Lutheran Mass of the Societas Sanctae Birgittae in Vadstena Abbey Church, Sweden

The recessional at the close of an Evangelical-Lutheran Mass at the Cathedral Church of Church of Saint Nicholas, Stockholm

One of the effects of the Tridentine reform was to ensure that the variety of devotions that sprang up in ecclesiastically fragmented parts of Europe were connected with the rituals of the Catholic Church. Not all devotional practices were tolerated. The Josephine Reforms banned Good Friday processions with costumed figures and palmesel processions for Palm Sunday, but some still went on. On Palm Sunday villagers carried green branches re-enacting Christ's entry into Jerusalem, and Palmesel processions still took place with a representation of Christ on a donkey. The parish of Niederwihl claimed possession of a piece of the True Cross and by the 18th century had introduced new processions for the Discovery of the True Cross (May 3) and the Elevation of the True Cross (September 14). The relic would be carried by the townspeople for processions through their agricultural fields integrating a Counter-Reformation devotional theme with the ancient fertility rites of the townsfolk's rural religion.

=== Imperial China ===
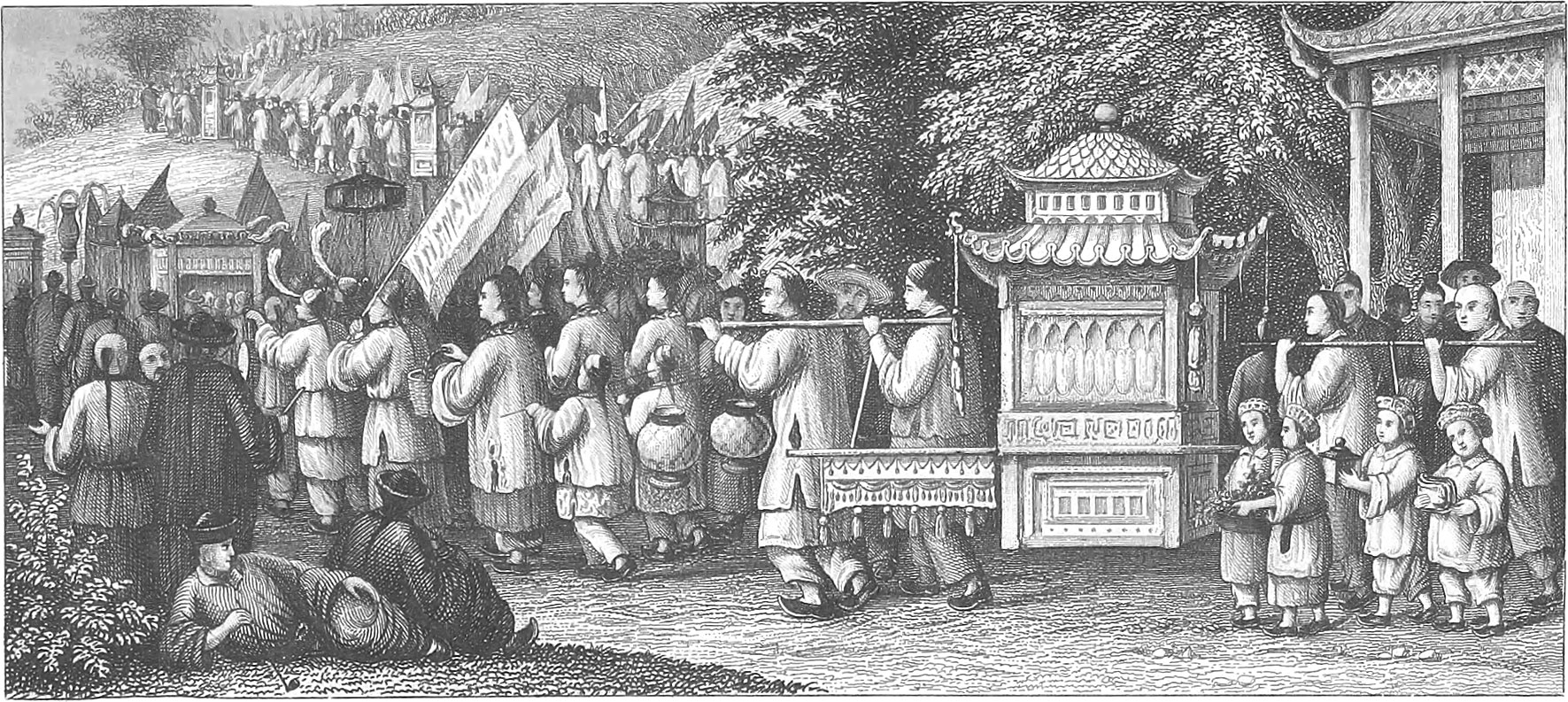
Chinese procession, by Johann Georg Heck.

The Story of the Stone, written in the 18th century, contains a description of the procession accompanying an Imperial Concubine:

Presently a faint sound of music was heard and the Imperial Concubine's procession at last came in sight. First came several pairs of eunuchs carrying embroidered banners. Then several more pairs with ceremonial pheasant-feather fans. Then eunuchs swinging gold-inlaid censers in which special 'palace incense' was burning. Next came a great gold-coloured 'seven phoenix' umbrella of state, hanging from its curve-topped shaft life a great drooping bell-flower. In its shadow was borne the Imperial Concubine's travelling wardrobe: her head-dress, robe, sash and shoes. Eunuch gentlemen-in-waiting followed carrying her rosary, her embroidered handkerchief, her spittoon, her fly-whisk, and various other items. Last of all, when this army of attendants had gone by, a great gold-topped palanquin with phoenixes embroidered on its yellow curtains slowly advanced on the shoulders of eight eunuch bearers.

=== Shi'a Islam ===
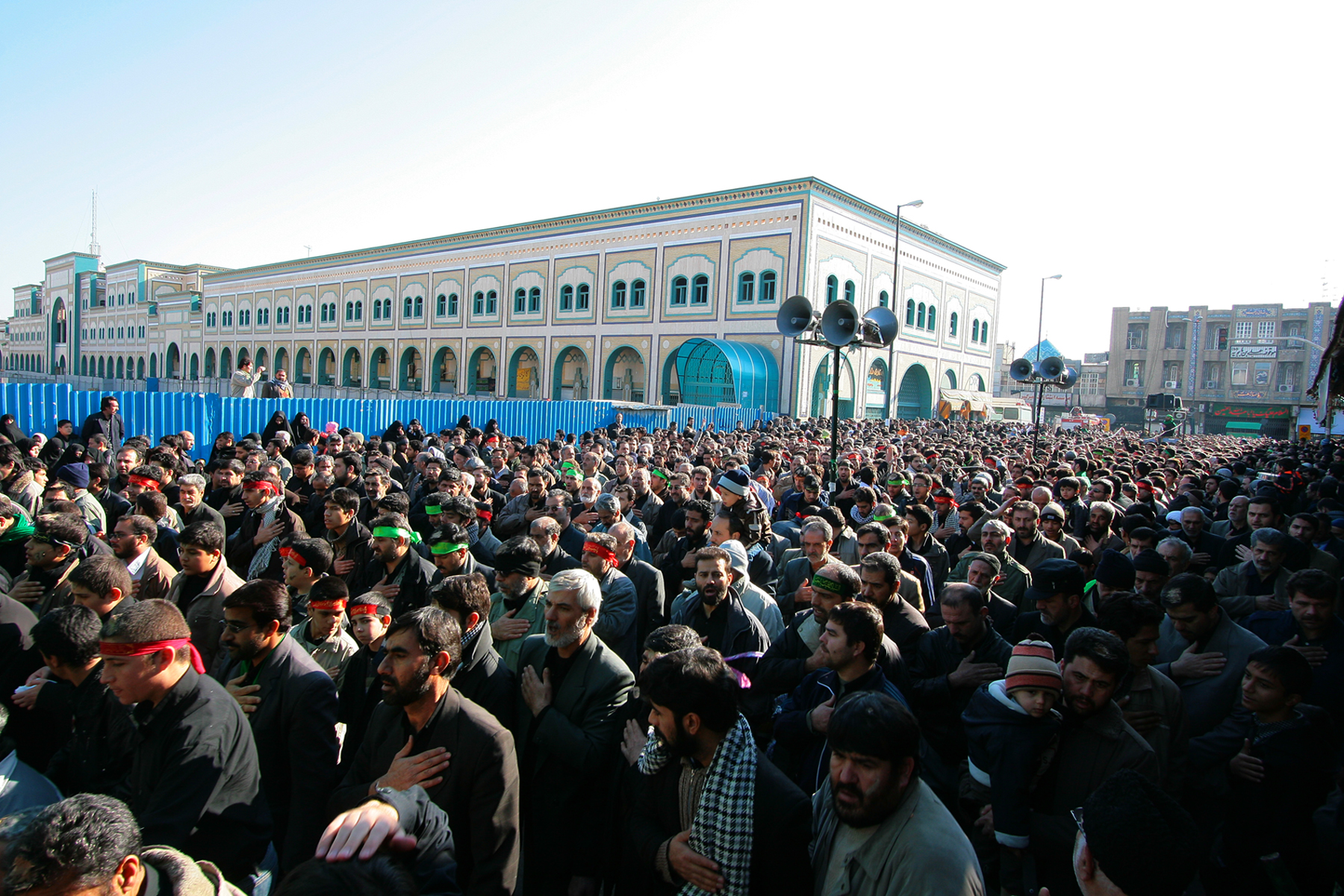
Mourning of Muharram procession in Iran

In Shi'a Islam, processions form an important part of Ashura, and the month of Muharram more broadly.

== Procession elements ==
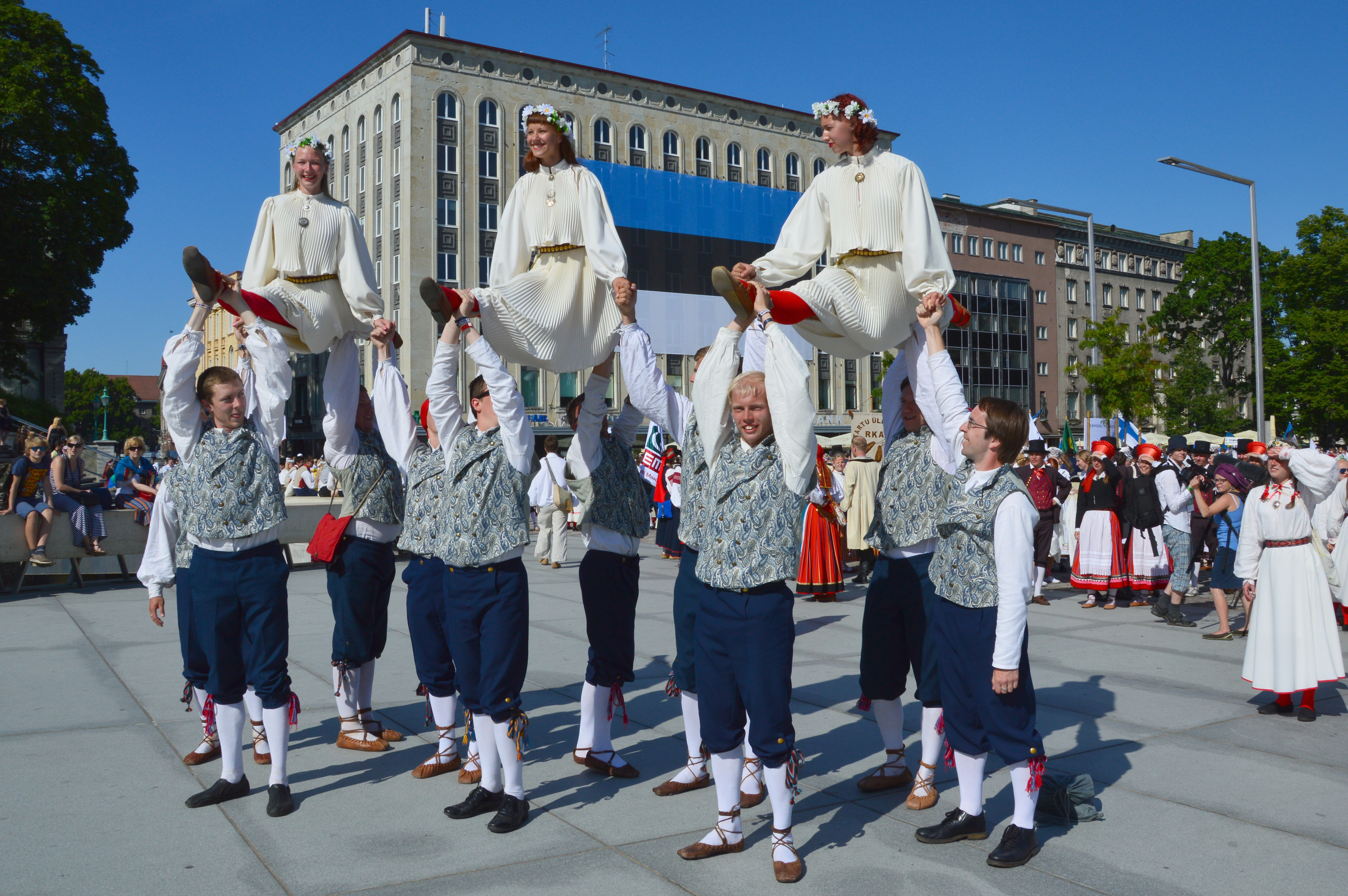
Preparations for Estonian Song Festival procession by University of Tartu Folk Art Ensemble. Over 42 000 persons participated in that procession in 2014.

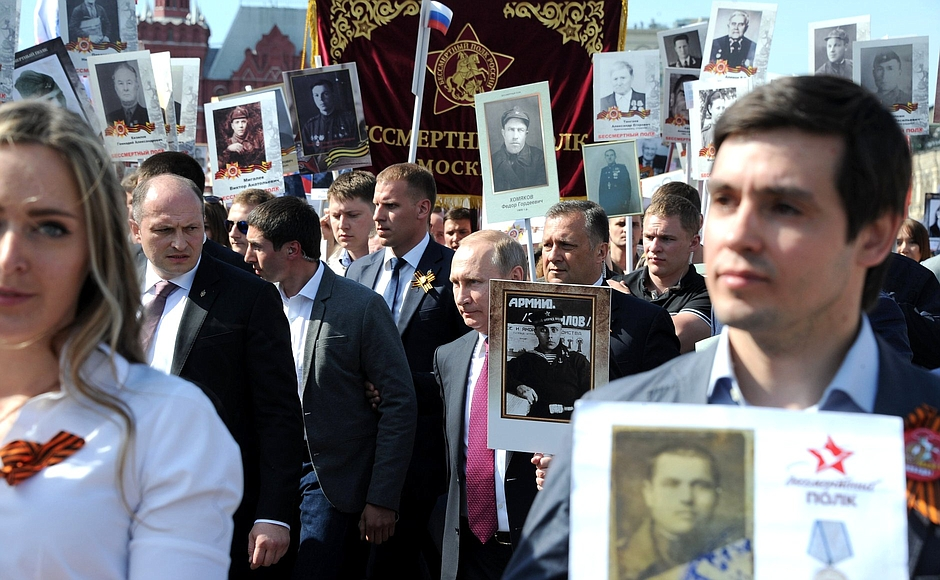
Vladimir Putin at the Immortal Regiment procession in Moscow.

Many elements may be used to make a procession more significant than just "people walking in the same direction":

- A special mode of transport, such as a ceremonial barge, elephant howdah, horse-drawn carriage, or a palanquin carried on the shoulders of others. Cleopatra's arrival to seduce Mark Antony on a perfumed barge has taken on legendary proportion. African kings sometimes ride in palanquins carved to look like luxury cars or other status symbols, while Muslim brides travel in camel howdahs as shown in Bride Arriving in a Village, Biskra, Algeria by Philippe Pavy. The Pope has traditionally been carried in a special sedan chair known as the sedia gestatoria. In humbler terms, a mayor, grand marshal, or fair "queen" of a local parade will often ride in the town's fanciest automobile.
- Music, including everything from the choir of a church procession to the marching band of a military procession. Criers may march before the procession, yelling to clear the way for it. Some high school homecoming parades include trucks filled with people who do nothing but make as much noise as possible.
- Order of precedence: even without showy display, a group of people walking forward may be said to form a procession if their order and placement clearly visualize a hierarchy or symbiotic relationship. For instance, one's nearness to the king or others of high rank had important political connotations when the royal family walked to or from chapel services at the palace of Versailles. Similarly, precedence came into play when the grandest Edwardian parties progressed from the sitting room to the dining room, and the stylized movement and hierarchy of marching military units clearly sets up a formal procession.
- Bearers of banners, fans, icons, treasure, or other eye-catching items, or leading exotic animals. This was a very important part of Roman triumphs, as booty gave the Roman populace visual proof of the warrior's success. The most elaborate evolution of this is the spectacular floats of Carnival parades. A simpler example is the ring bearer at a wedding.
- Scent, provided by flower bearers or censers of incense.
- Skilled performers, such as acrobats or dancers
- Special costume: traditionally, the costumes of acolytes, footmen, ceremonial guards, or slaves help show off the wealth of the person staging a procession. An ornate example was the embroidered train of George IV of the United Kingdom, carried at his coronation by nine lords in waiting with their own matching silken clothes, capes, ruffs, and plumed hats. Other examples include the Swiss Guard and high vestments of the Pope. The formal, matching clothes of bridesmaids and groomsmen are in the same tradition, although sometimes purchased at the attendant's expense rather than by the people honored in the ceremony. In egalitarian times and places, whoever has taken the time and money to put together something impressive may appear in a parade; such costumes are of course the focal point of Halloween parades such as that staged in Greenwich Village, New York. Finally, processions may be staged simply to show off the costumes as one part of a larger event, such as at fashion pageants, military reenactments, pop concerts, or Renaissance Festivals.
- Special lighting: candlelight vigils for the deceased or to show political solidarity often include a candlelit procession. Fireworks illuminate such diverse events as coronations, parades, and Thai royal barge processions.
- Spectacle, such as an aircraft flyover, or the confetti of New York ticker tape parades
- The dispensing of gifts, at one time often food or money. Today, most people are familiar with the dispensing of beads at Mardi Gras and the throwing of candy at local fair parades.

== Functions of processions ==
=== Advertisement ===
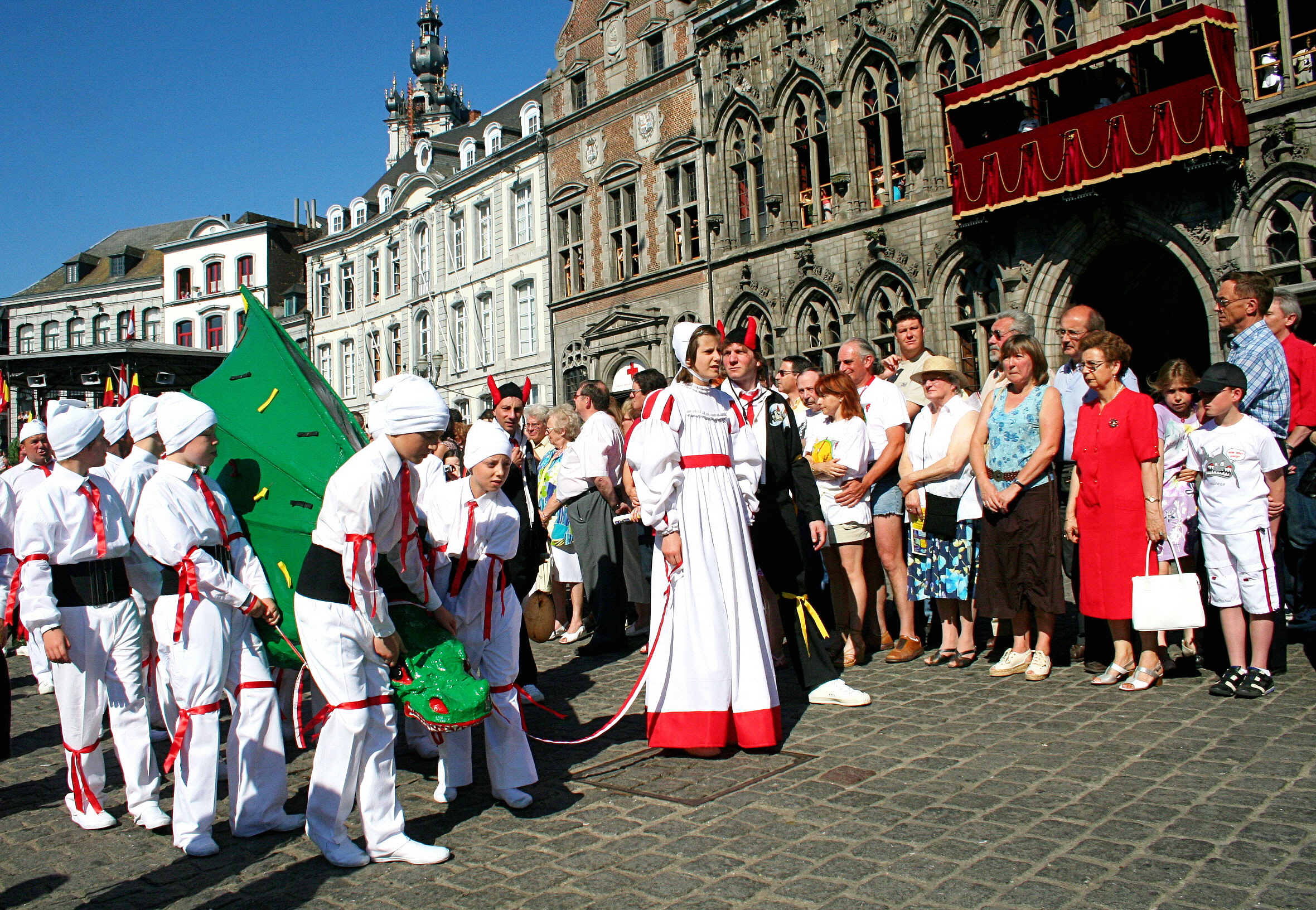
The Petit Doudou actors in the procession of the Golden Car in Mons (Belgium)

Edo-period documenters enjoyed drawing the processions of pleasure district beauties, such as Courtesan Parading With Attendants by Suzuki Harunobu. Similar parading courtesans feature in Cherry Blossom in the Evening on the Nakanomachi in Yoshiwara by Utagawa Hiroshige and True Scenery of the Gay Quarter of Minatozakimachi Shinminato by Utagawa Sadahide. The Lord Mayor's Show in London has long featured displays by the city's official trade guilds. Parades were at one time important advertisement when a traveling circus arrived in a new town. Today, many parades in the United States are sponsored by department stores, such as Macy's, which expect the public spectacle to lure shoppers to the store.

=== Change in government ===
The Reception of the Ambassadors From Siam at the Château de Fontainebleau was one such example, documented by Jean-Léon Gérôme in 1864. The signing of surrender by Japanese diplomats and soldiers aboard an American battle ship at the end of World War II involved a strictly codified procession on and off the ship.

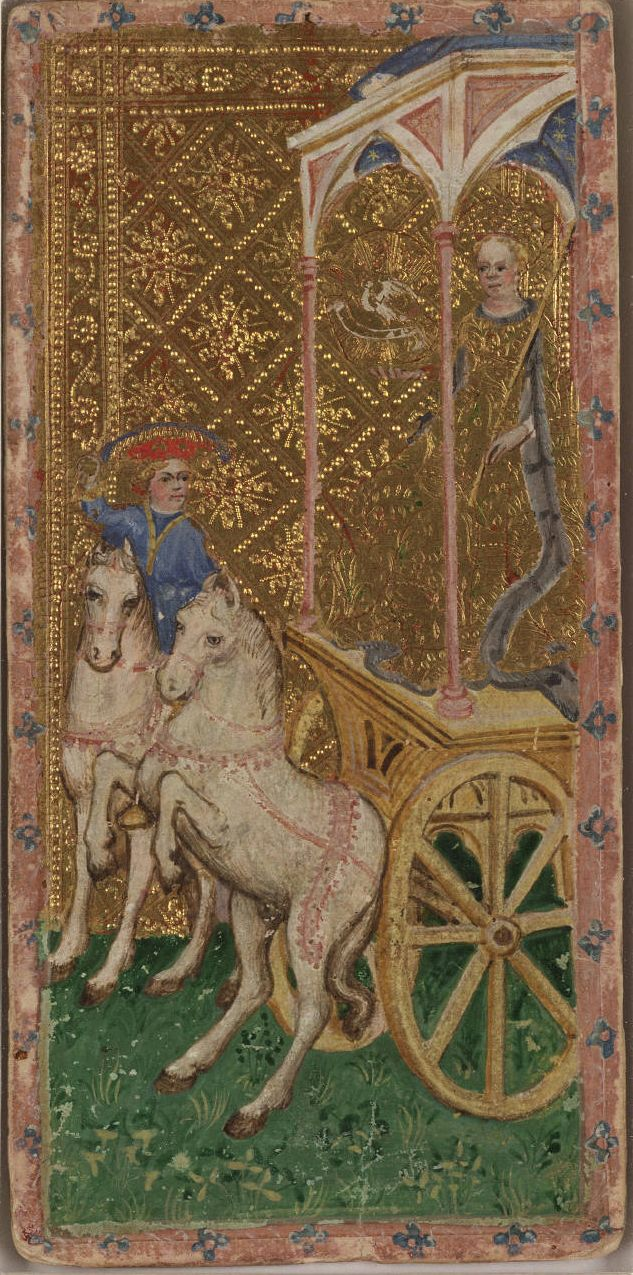
Royal procession, design from the 14th century.

Processions play an important role in coronations, such as that of Elizabeth II of the United Kingdom in 1953, the Shah of Iran in 1967, Otumfuo Nana Osei Tutu II of the Ashanti in 1999, and Norodom Sihamoni of Cambodia in 2004.

=== Display of power ===
Such as ancient Roman triumphs, the durbar processions of India, and modern reviewing of the troops by generals and heads of state. Return From Vienna, a painting by Jozef Brandt, shows war booty taken from the Turks being escorted into eastern Europe by soldiers.

=== Entertainment ===
Some processions are arranged for entertainment, purely for fun, such as those of community organizations and friendly societies, so popular in Great Britain and the United States of America.

=== Protest ===
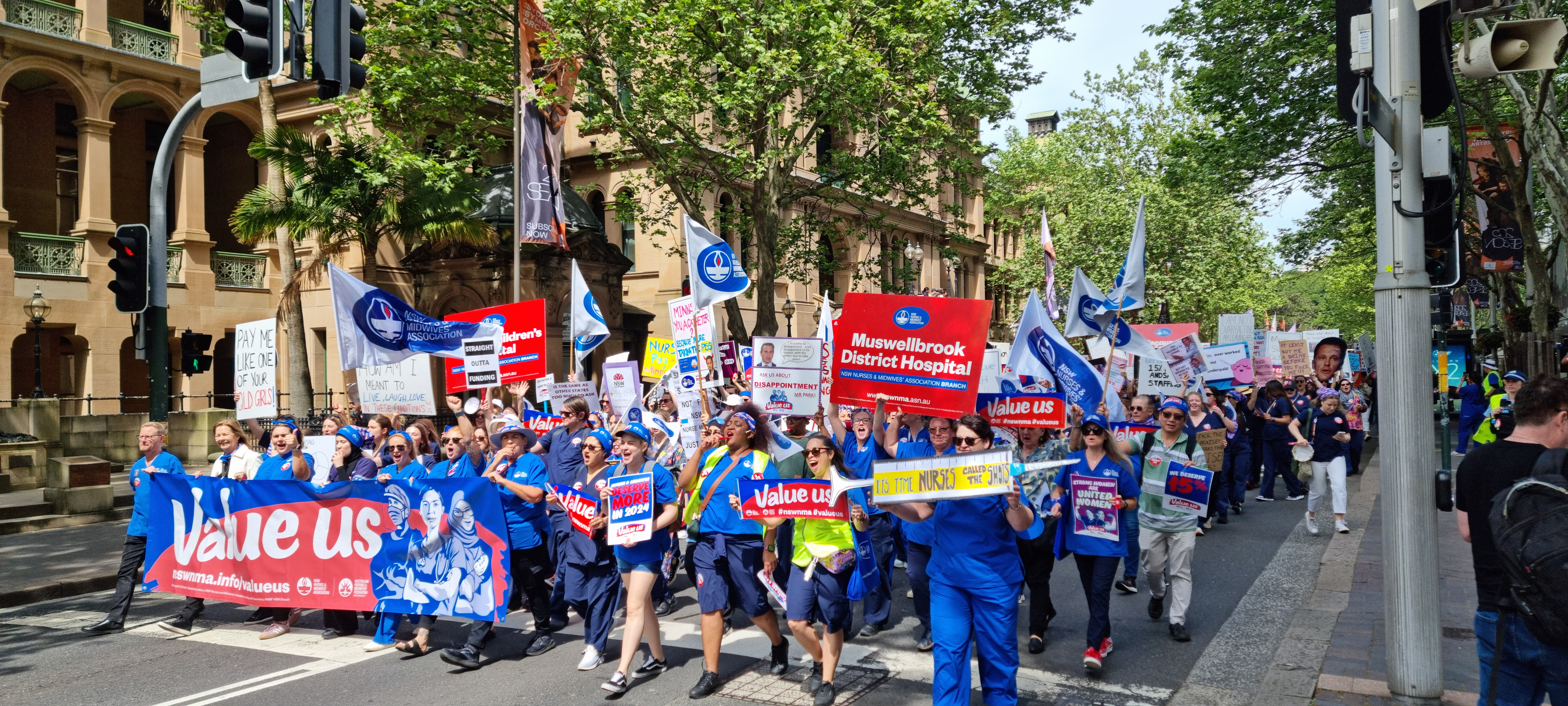
Protest march by New South Wales nurses.

Protest marches are a form of procession.

=== Solidarity ===
Religious ceremonies have since prehistory employed the procession of holy objects to inspire solidarity of belief. The Doges of Venice once staged elaborate barge processions to bless the waters on which Venice's tightly controlled maritime economy depended.

=== Events ===
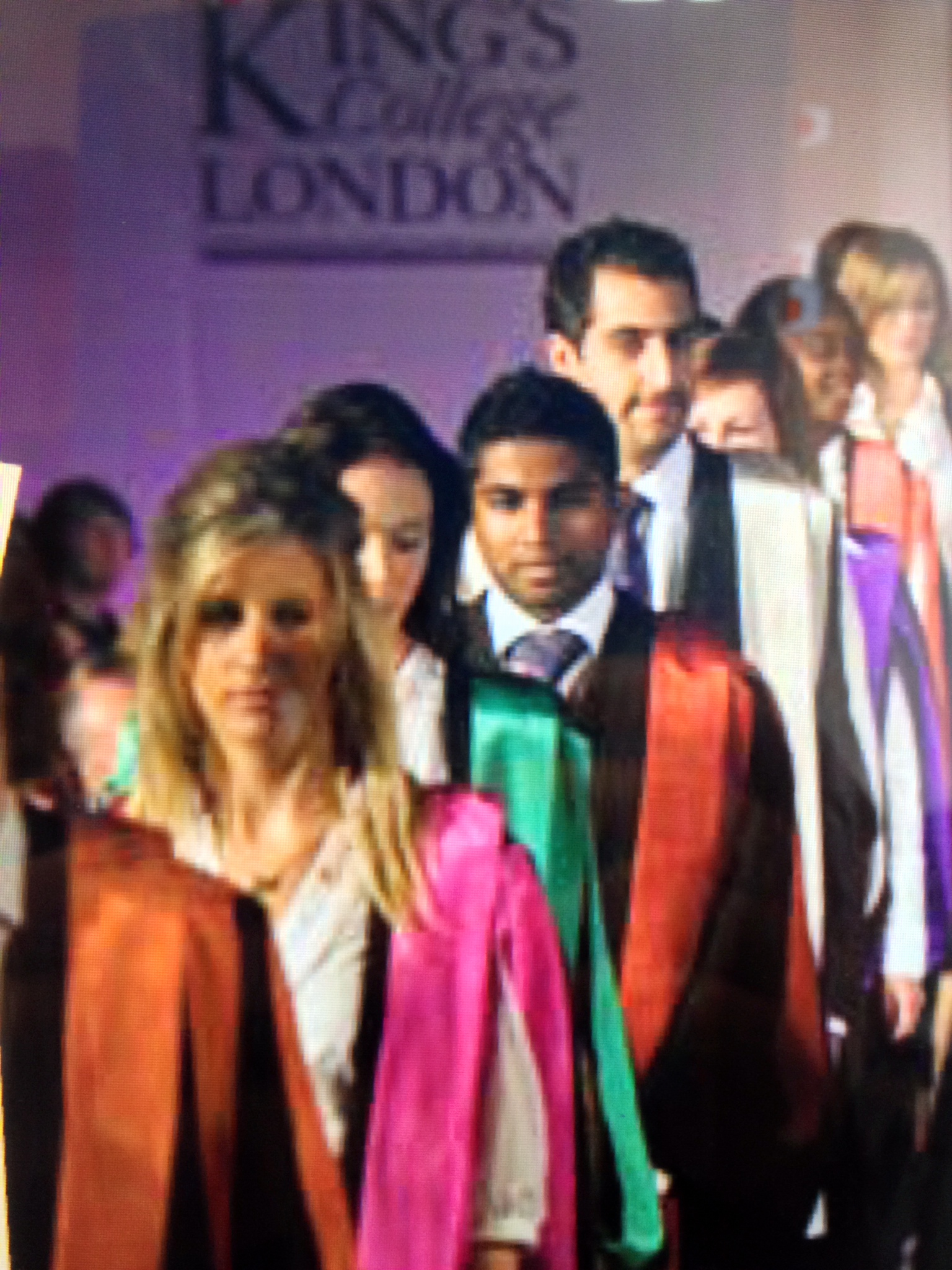
Graduation procession of King's College London, one of the founding colleges of the University of London, showcasing the academic dresses created by globally-renowned fashion designer Vivienne Westwood during the Summer 2008 graduation.

Processions used to mark the beginning or end of an event, such as parades at the beginning of county fairs or at the Olympic Games, or processions that begin and end funerals, graduations, and weddings.

== Christian processions ==
Chienbäse procession with burning wood bundles and fire carts in Liestal, Switzerland (2013)

Processions are found in almost every form of religious worship, such as Holy Week processions. Some biblical examples were the processions with the Ark of Covenant and the procession of Jesus on a donkey into Jerusalem.

In a narrower sense of going forth, proceeding, the term is used in the technical language of theology in the phrase Procession of the Holy Ghost, expressing the relation of the Third Person in the Triune Godhead to the Father and the Son.

It is impossible to describe in detail the vast development of processions during the Middle Ages. The most important and characteristic of these still have a place in the ritual of the Catholic Church and Evangelical-Lutheran Church, as well as those of the Church of England (Anglicanism) and the Orthodox Church.

The Procession Path (Lat. ambitus templi) is the route taken by processions on solemn days in large churches—up the north aisle, round behind the high altar, down the south aisle, and then up the centre of the nave.

=== Catholics ===
For the Catholic Church, the rules governing processions laid down in the pre Vatican II Rituale Romanum (Tit. ix.), and they are classified in the following way:

1. Processiones generales, in which the whole body of the clergy takes part.
2. Processiones ordinariae, on yearly festivals, such as the Feast of the Presentation of the Lord (Candlemas), the procession on Palm Sunday or Holy Week (Easter Sunday), the Litaniae Majores and Minores, the Feast of Corpus Christi, in possible addition to Feast of the Ascension, Feast of the Cross, Forty Hours' Devotion and on other days, according to the custom of the churches.
3. Processiones extraordinariae, or processions ordered on special occasions, e.g. to pray for rain or fine weather; in time of storm, famine, plague, war, or, in quacumque tribulatione; processions of thanksgiving; translation of relics; or the dedication of a church or a cemetery.

There are also processions of honor, for instance to meet a royal personage, or the bishop on his first entry into his diocese (Pontif. Tom. iii.).

Those taking part in processions are to walk bare-headed (weather permitting), two and two, in decent costume, and with reverent mien; clergy and laity, men and women, are to walk separately. The cross is carried at the head of the procession, and banners embroidered with sacred pictures in places where this is customary; these banners must not be of military or triangular shape. Violet is the prescribed colour for processions, except on Corpus Christi, or on a day when some other colour is mandated. The officiating priest wears a cope, or at least a surplice with a violet stole, while other priests and clergy wear surplices.

A Eucharistic procession is one in which the Host is carried in procession in a monstrance. It is often covered with a canopy and accompanied with candles. At the litaniae majores and minores and other penitential processions, joyful hymns are not allowed, but the litanies are sung, and, if the length of the procession requires, the penitential and gradual psalms. As to the discipline regarding processions the bishop, according to the Council of Trent (Sess. 25 de reg. cap. 6), appoints and regulates processions and public prayers outside the churches.

The observance or variation of the discipline belongs to the Sacred Congregation of Rites; in pontifical processions, which are regulated by the masters of the ceremonies (magistri ceremoniarum pontificalium), these points are decided by the chief cardinal deacon. As to processions within the churches, some difference of opinion having arisen as to the regulating authority, the Sacred Congregation of Rites has decided that the bishop must ask, though not necessarily follow, the advice of the chapter in their regulation.

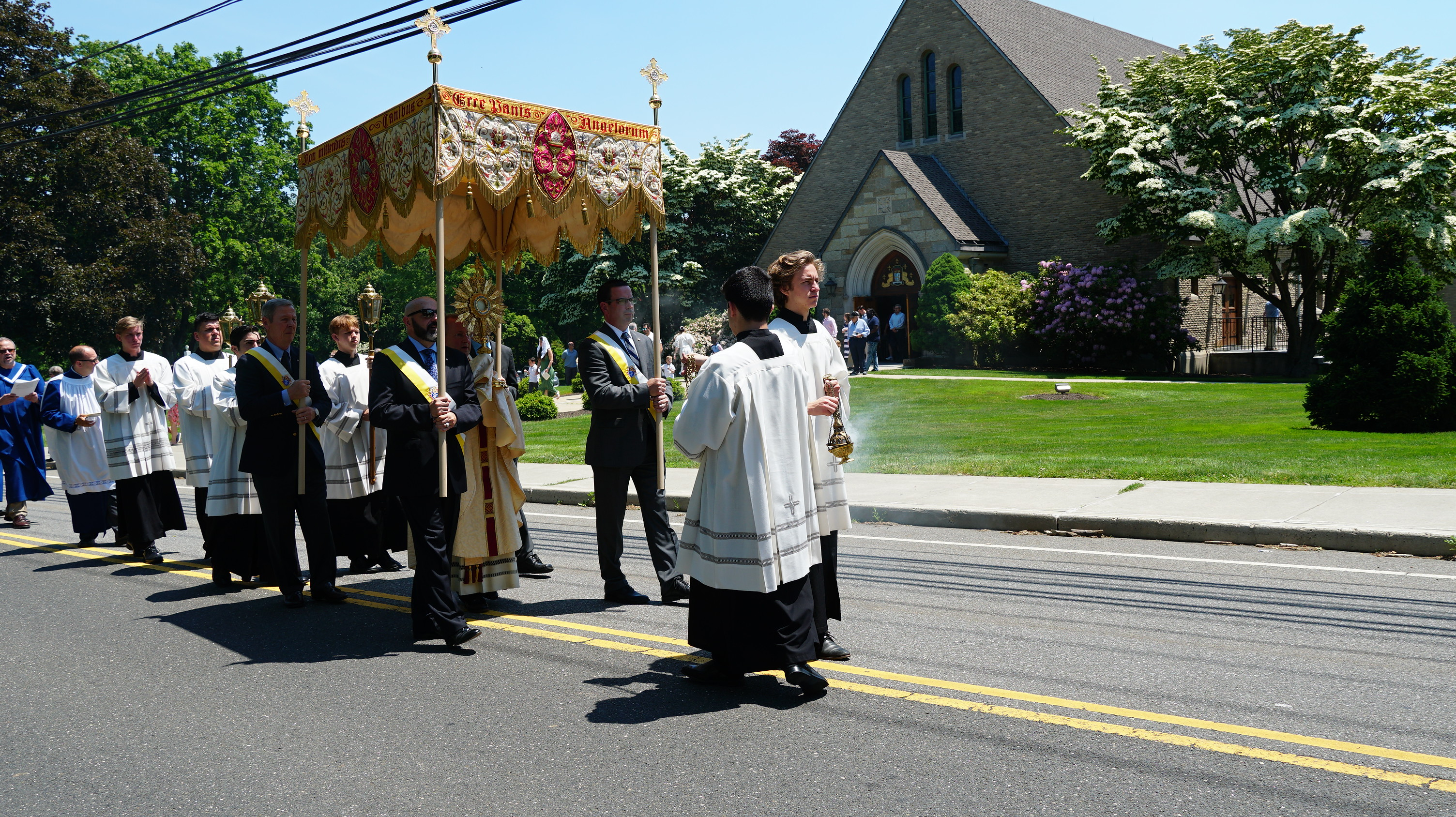
The Eucharistic Procession at St. Catherine of Siena Church, Trumbull CT on the Solemnity of the Most Holy Body and Blood of Christ, Corpus Christi.

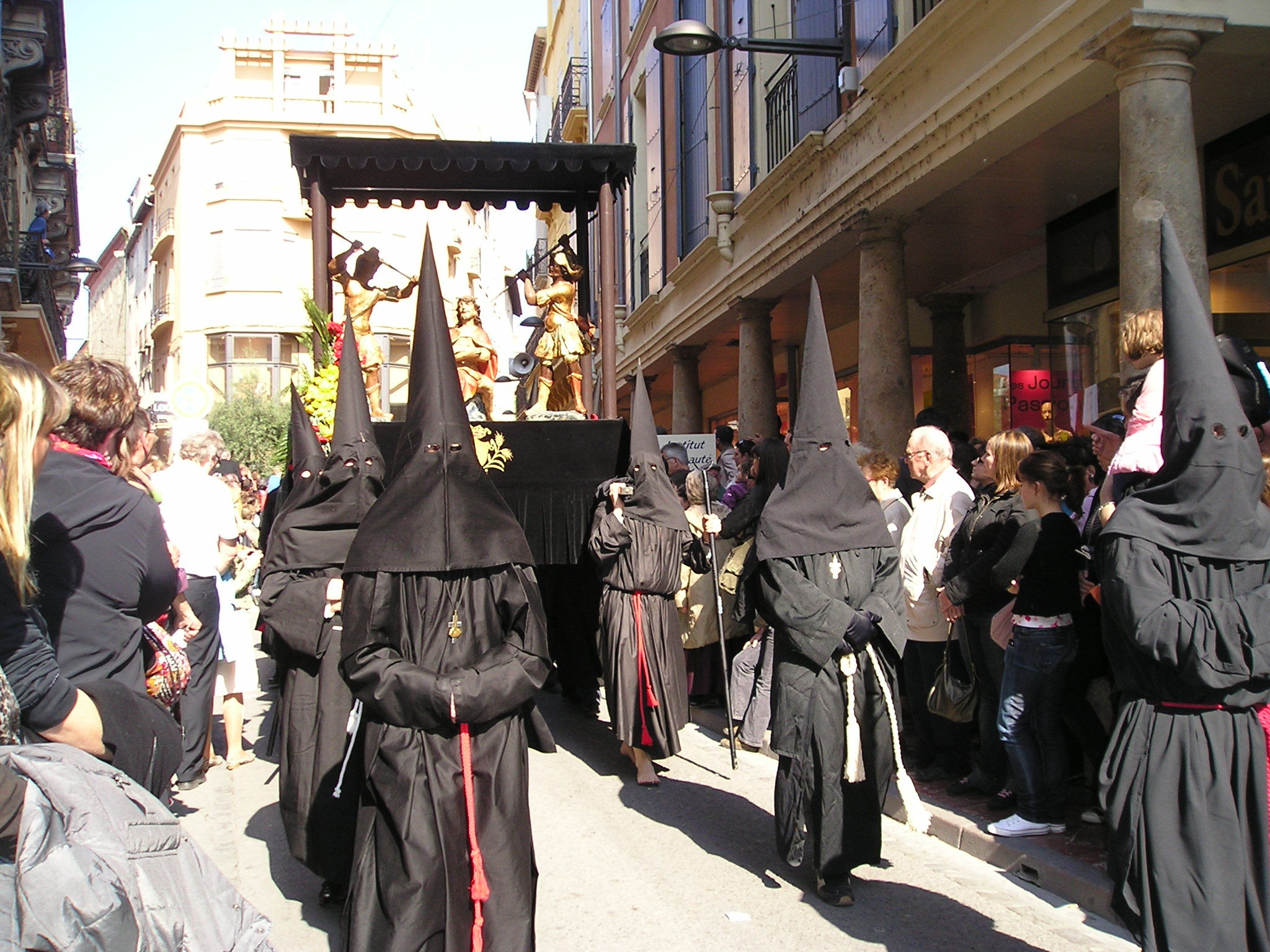
"Sanch Procession" celebrating the passion of the Christ (since 1461), once forbidden, is still celebrated in the French southern cities and towns of Perpignan, Arles-sur-Tech and Collioure

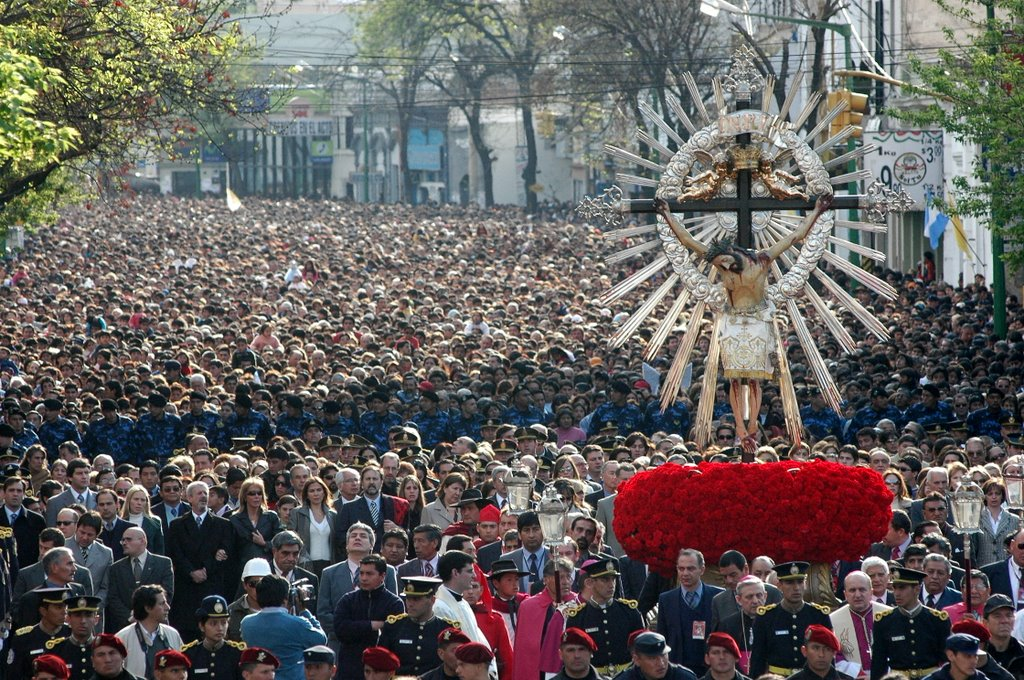
Procession in Salta City, Argentina

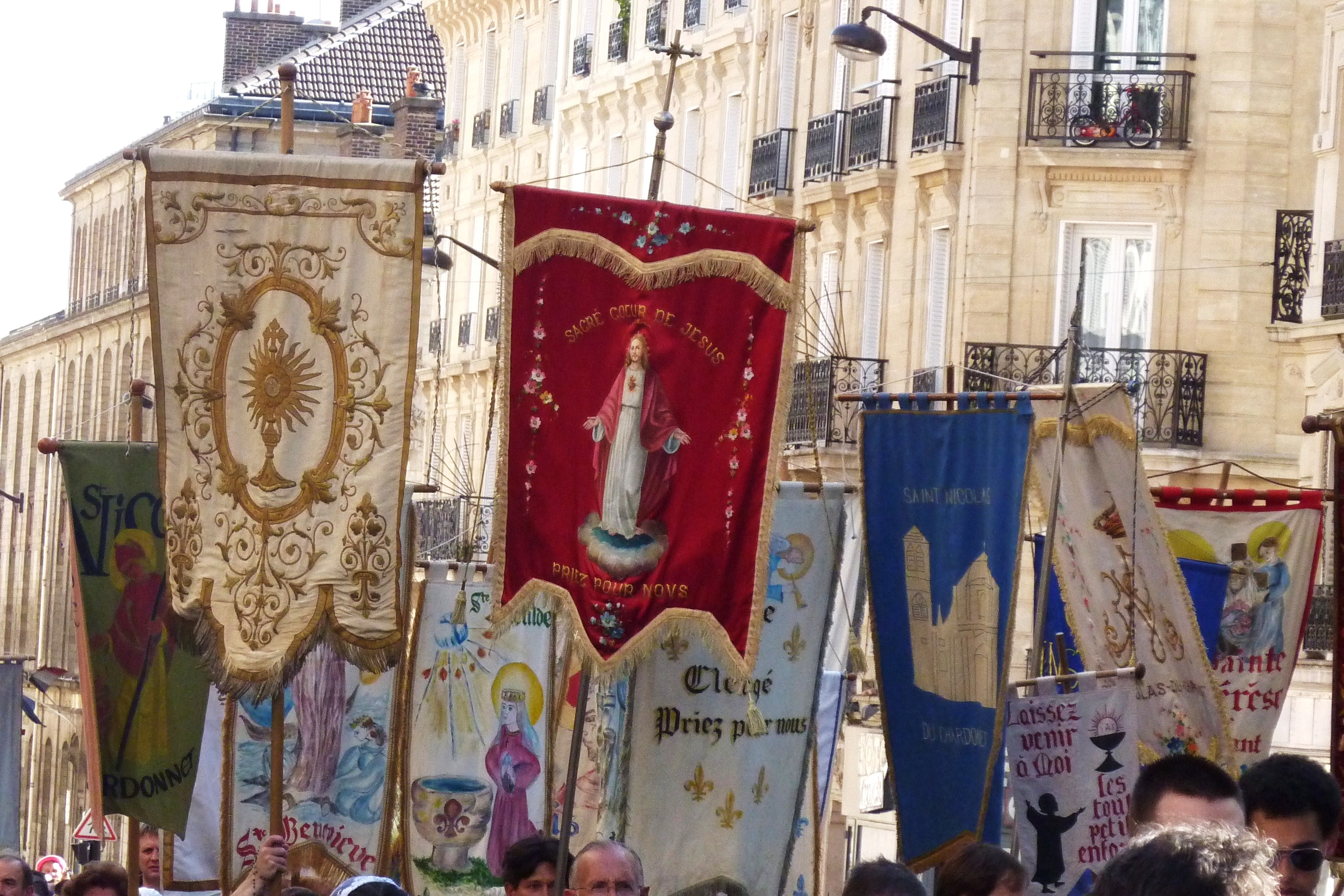
Procession on the feast of the Assumption, 15 August, in Paris

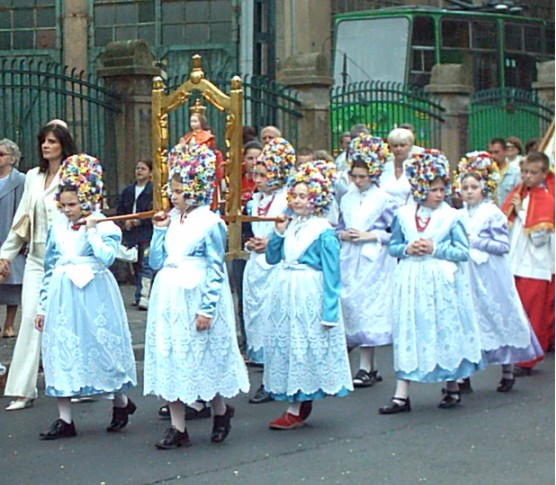
Corpus Christi procession in Poznań, Poland, 2004: little girls carrying an Infant Jesus of Prague statue, followed by altar servers clothed in surplice and cassock

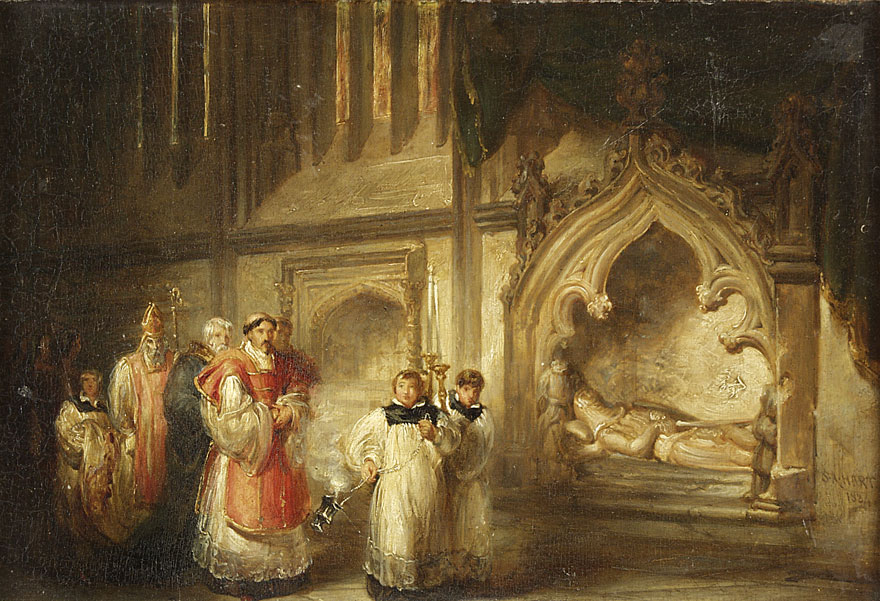
Painting of the Monument of Richard Stapleton in Exeter Cathedral (painting by S. A. Hart), showing a liturgical procession

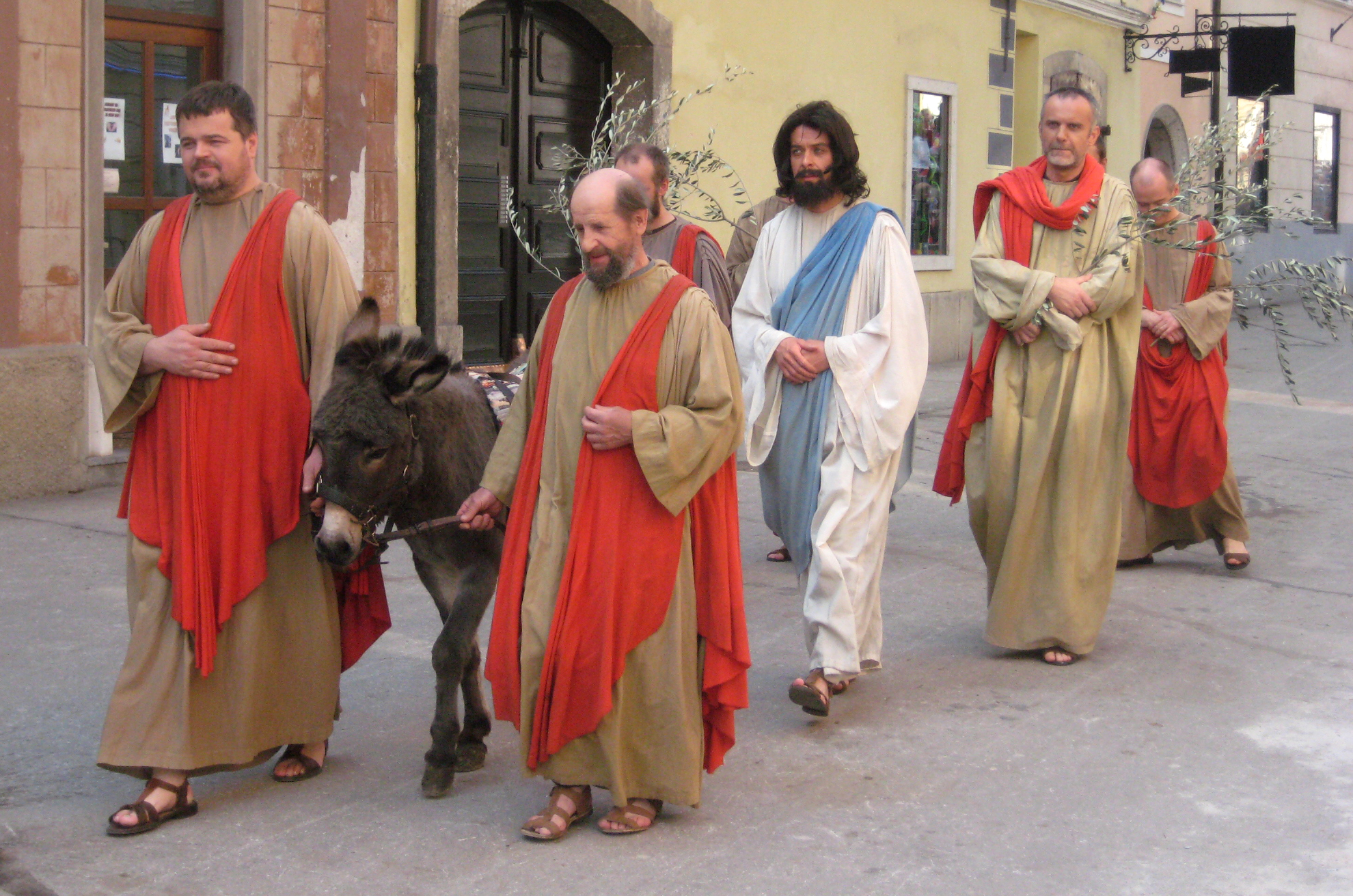
Škofja Loka Passion Play is a revived Baroque Passion procession from Škofja Loka, Slovenia. It is shaped as a play and represents stories from the life of Jesus

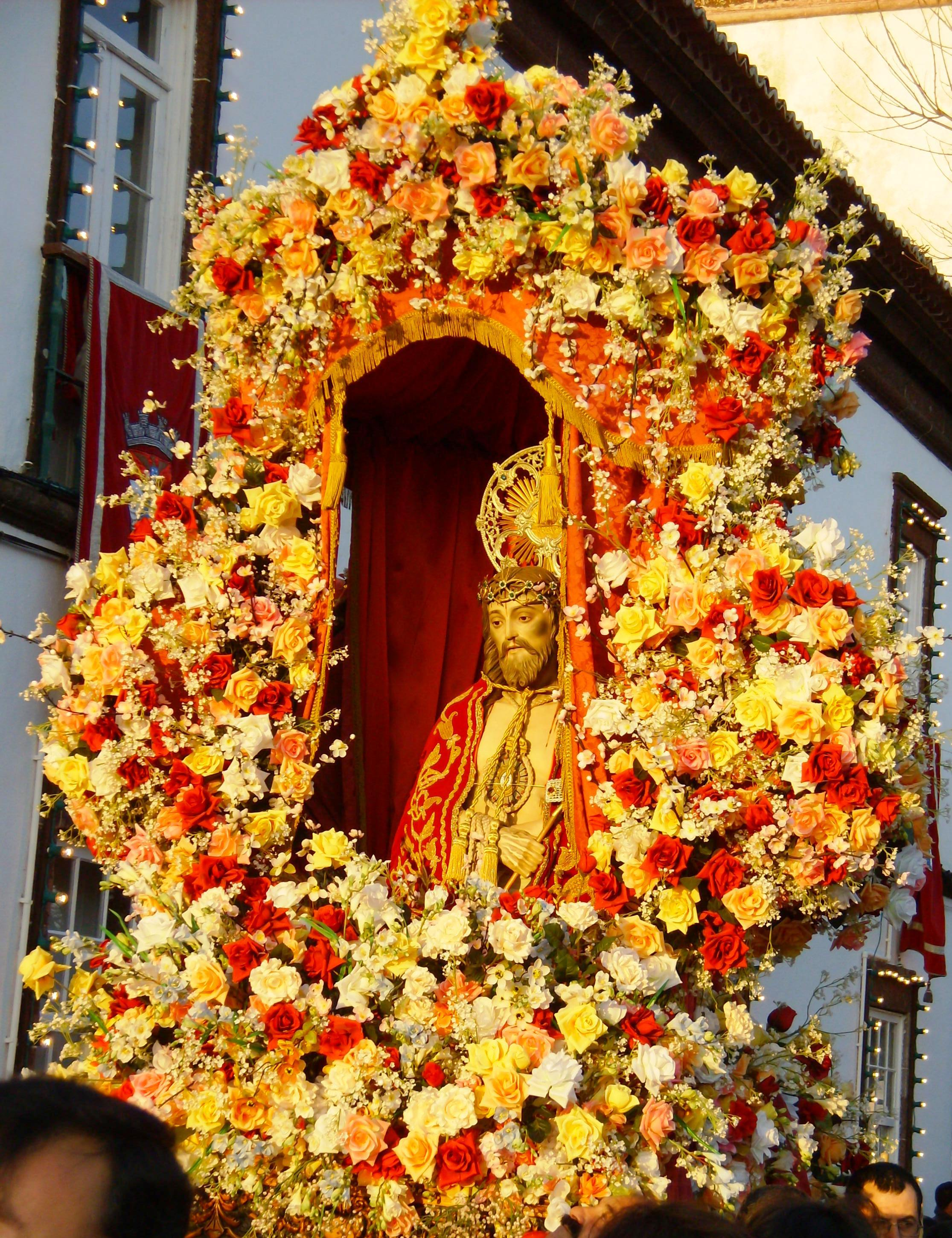
Our Lord Jesus Christ of the Miracles procession in Ponta Delgada (Azores)

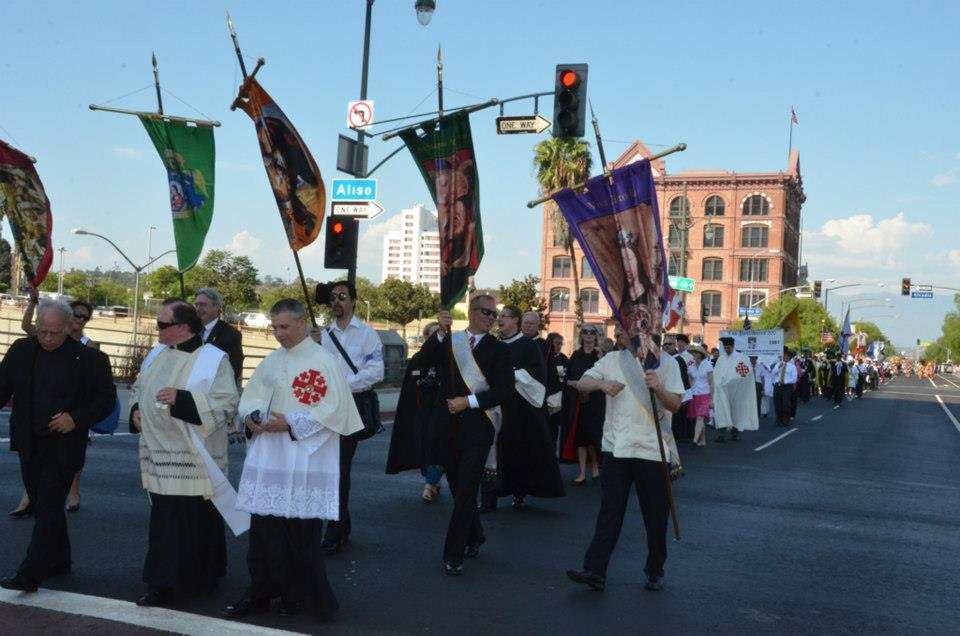
Grand Marian Procession in Los Angeles, California, an annual tradition revived in September 2011 by the Queen of Angels Foundation, founded by Mark Anchor Albert

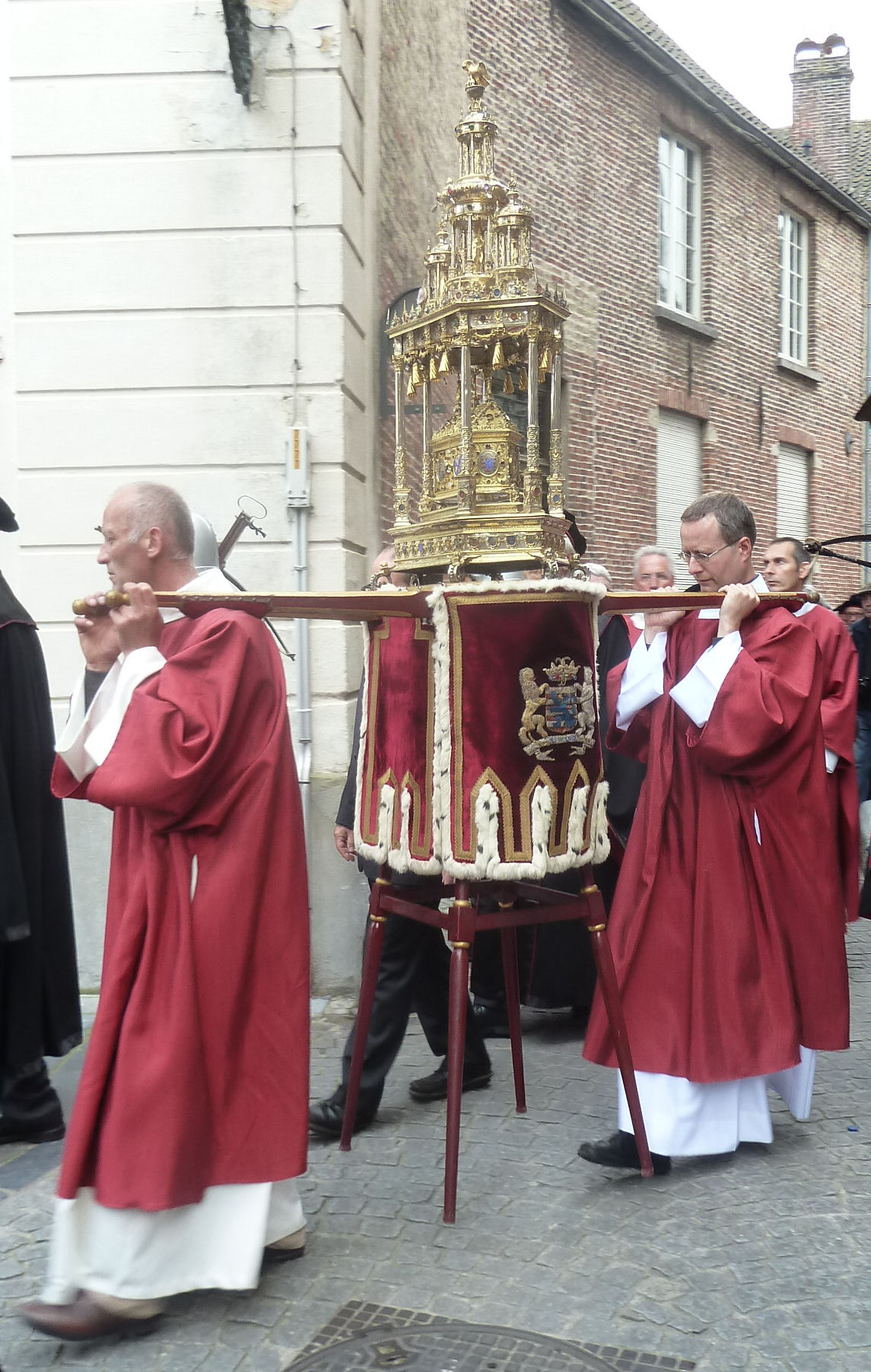
Annual procession of the Holy Blood in Bruges, Belgium

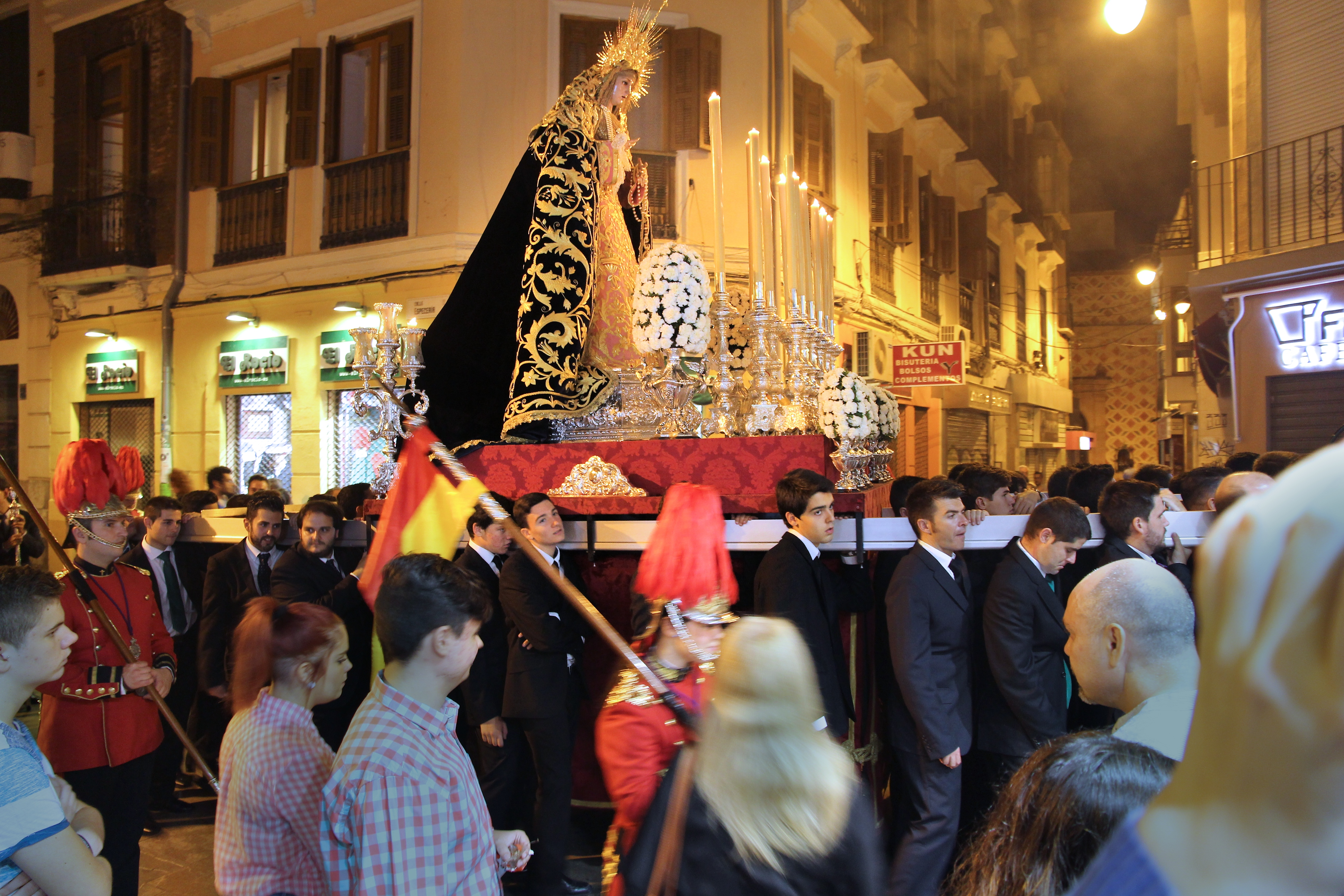
Rosary procession in October in Málaga, Spain

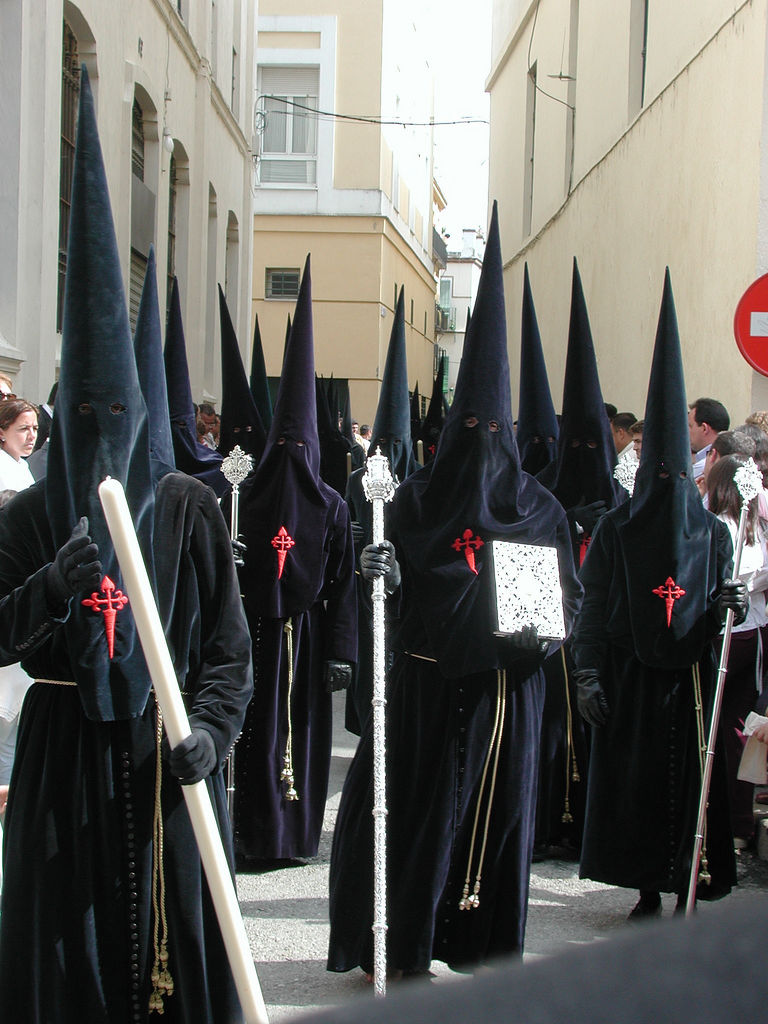
Holy Week in Seville, Spain, Royal archbrotherhood of "La Carretería"

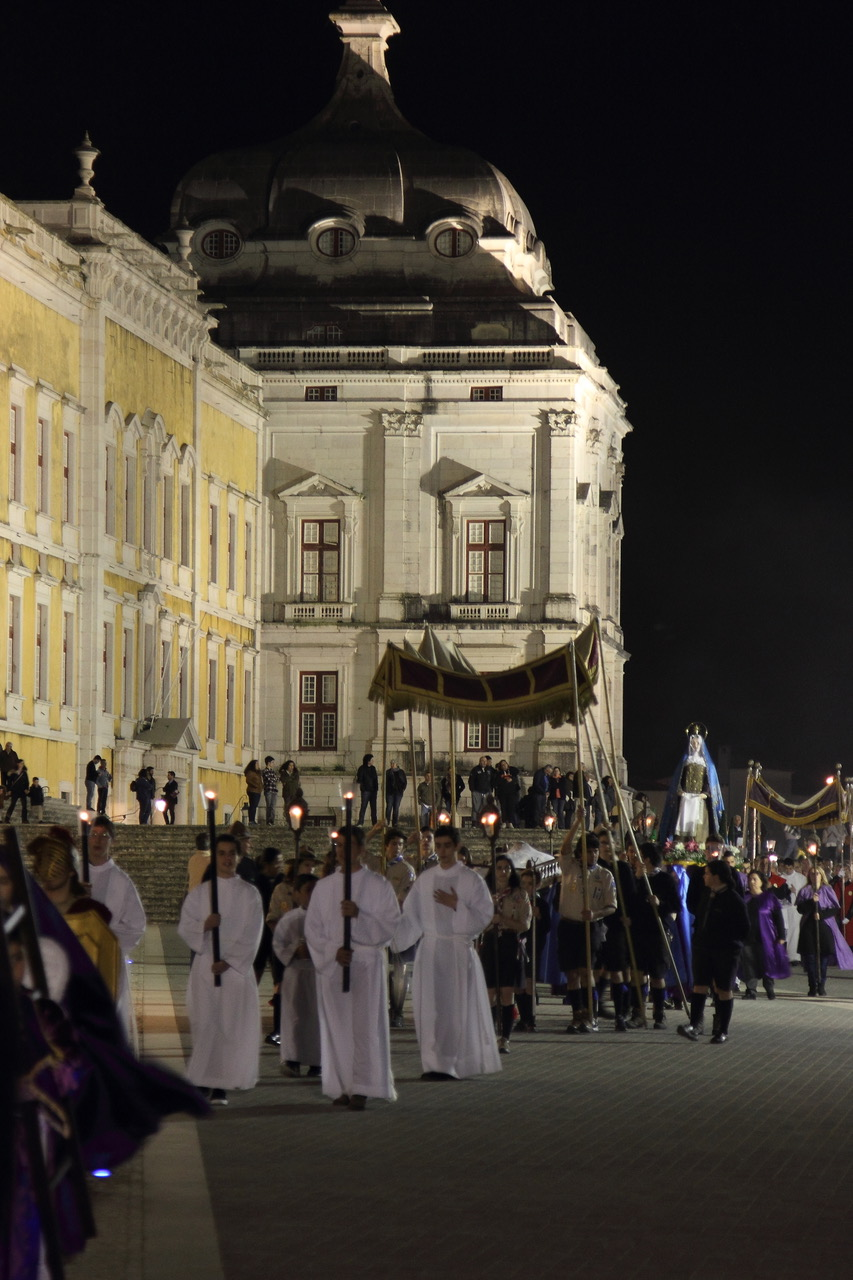
Procession of the Burial of the Lord in Mafra, Portugal

=== Evangelical-Lutheran ===
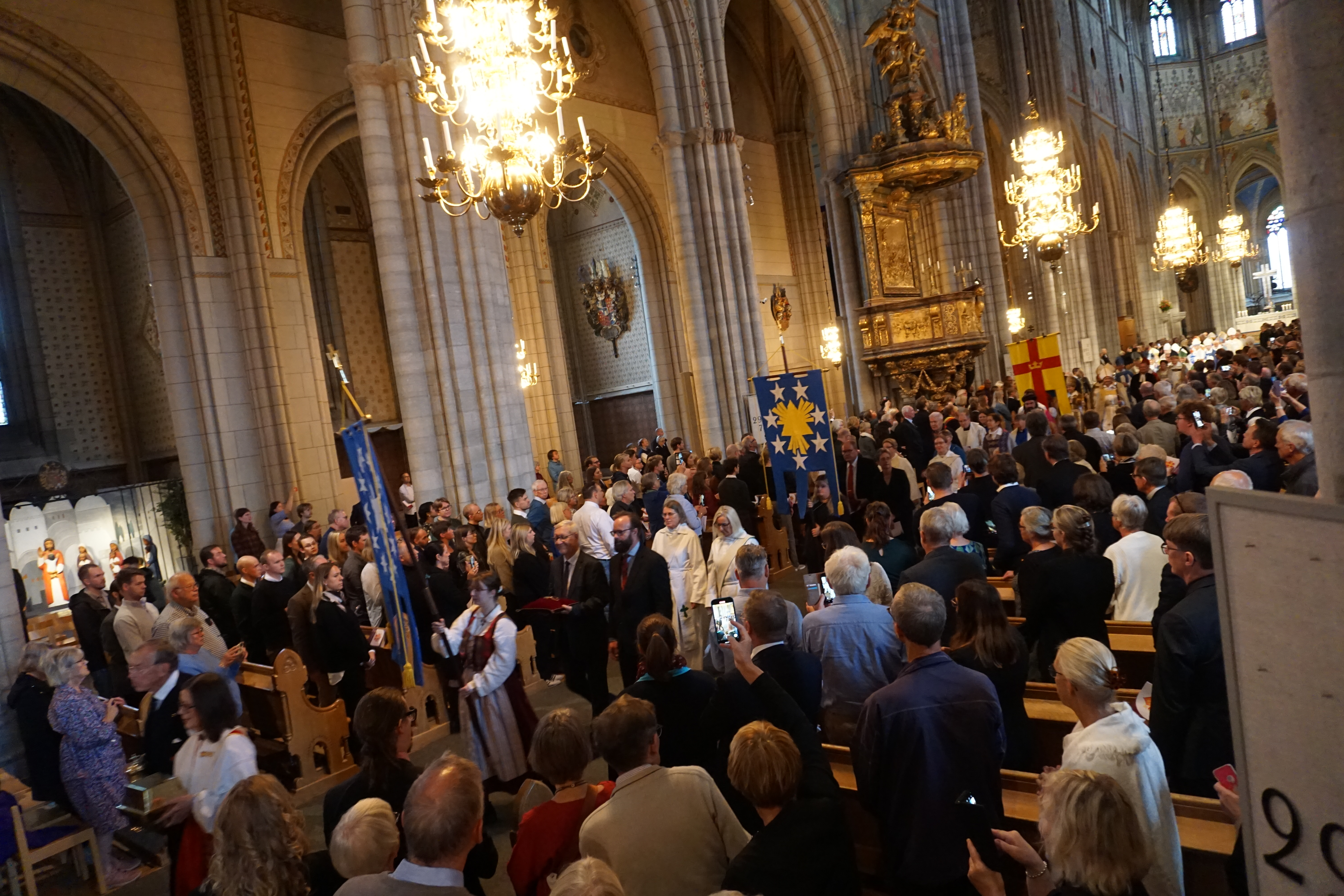
Recessional with diocesan banners in Uppsala Cathedral concluding a Evangelical-Lutheran Mass during which two new bishops were consecrated

The Evangelical-Lutheran practice has varied at different times and in different countries. Thus, according to the Württemberg Kirchenordnung of 1553, a funeral procession was prescribed, the bier being followed by the congregation singing hymns; the Brandenburg Kirchenordnung (1540) directed a cross-bearer to precede the procession and lighted candles to be carried, and this was prescribed also by the Waldeck Kirchenordnung of 1556. At present funeral processions survive in general only in the country districts; the processional cross or crucifix is carried. The Evangelical-Lutheran Churches have retained the ancient rogation processions in the week before Whitsuntide and, in some cases, in the month of May or on special occasions (e.g. days of humiliation, Busstage), processions about the fields to ask a blessing on the crops. On these occasions, the ancient litanies are still used.

People belonging to the Evangelical-Lutheran Societas Sanctae Birgittae processing at Vadstena Abbey Church in Sweden

The recessional at the close of an Evangelical-Lutheran Mass at Vadstena Abbey Church in Sweden

A procession at the time of the Gospel reading in Vadstena Abbey Church (Evangelical-Lutheran), Sweden

An Evangelical-Lutheran procession of the Societas Sanctae Birgittae (SSB)

Recessional at the conclusion of Mass on All Hallows' Eve in the Evangelical-Lutheran Hedvig Eleonora Church

The faithful, in the Evangelical-Lutheran tradition, bow towards the processional cross and make the sign of the cross as it passes in processions, as a sign of reverence to Jesus.

=== Eastern Orthodox ===
==== Outdoors ====
Typically the procession commences with the phanarion (a lantern) followed by the cross, (Note: For which reason this is called in Russian: Крестный ход, Krestnyi khod, cross procession) flanked by processional banners and icons, then choir and clergy, the deacons with censers, the priests with icons, and then the faithful. Hymns particular to the event are sung. Typically the outside of the church is circled thrice; however, some processions proceed to a designated place where a ceremony, e.g., a baptism or burial, is performed.

- Well-known processions prescribed annually include:
  - Pascha (Easter) — During the Paschal Vigil at midnight on Easter Sunday.
  - Bright Week Each day following at the end of the Divine Liturgy, when the Artos is carried and the paschal canon is sung.
  - Great Saturday With the epitaphios carried around the church thrice, as at a priest's funeral, the choir singing the Trisagion (Note: In some traditions, a procession takes place on Palm Sunday as well.)
  - Theophany — When the Great Blessing of Waters is at a body of water or an external baptistry (Note: A similar procession takes place sundry other times when the Lesser Blessing of Waters is performed.)
  - Paraklesis — Often on the patronal feast of a church, a procession around the outside of the church in conjunction with the paraklesis (prayer of intercession) to the church's namesake
  - Lity — May be held outdoors with a procession
  - Great Thursday — Sundry local customs
- Well-known processions for occasional events include:
  - Funeral — The coffin is carried to the grave accompanied by singing of the Trisagion. (Note: If the deceased is a priest or bishop the clergy chant the Great Canon of St. Andrew)
  - Consecration of a church — The relics to be placed in the altar are, after an all-night vigil, carried in solemn procession to a nearby church, placed on the altar for an early divine liturgy, and then carried in solemn procession back to the church being consecrated.

==== Indoors ====
- The "Little Entrance" at the divine liturgy and at vespers
- The "Great Entrance" at the divine liturgy and, in modified form, at the divine liturgy of the presanctified gifts
- Many occasions when a bishop presides, such as:
  - The meeting of bishop, when the youngest priest, all the deacons with censers, and lower clergy meet the bishop (who is escorted from his home by two subdeacons) at the western door of the church and solemnly escorted to the iconostasis and then to his throne for vesting
  - Whenever a bishop censes the entire church, he is accompanied by deacons with candles and subdeacons with the dikirion and trikirion
- On Great Thursday, sundry local customs.

==== Gallery of Eastern Orthodox processions ====
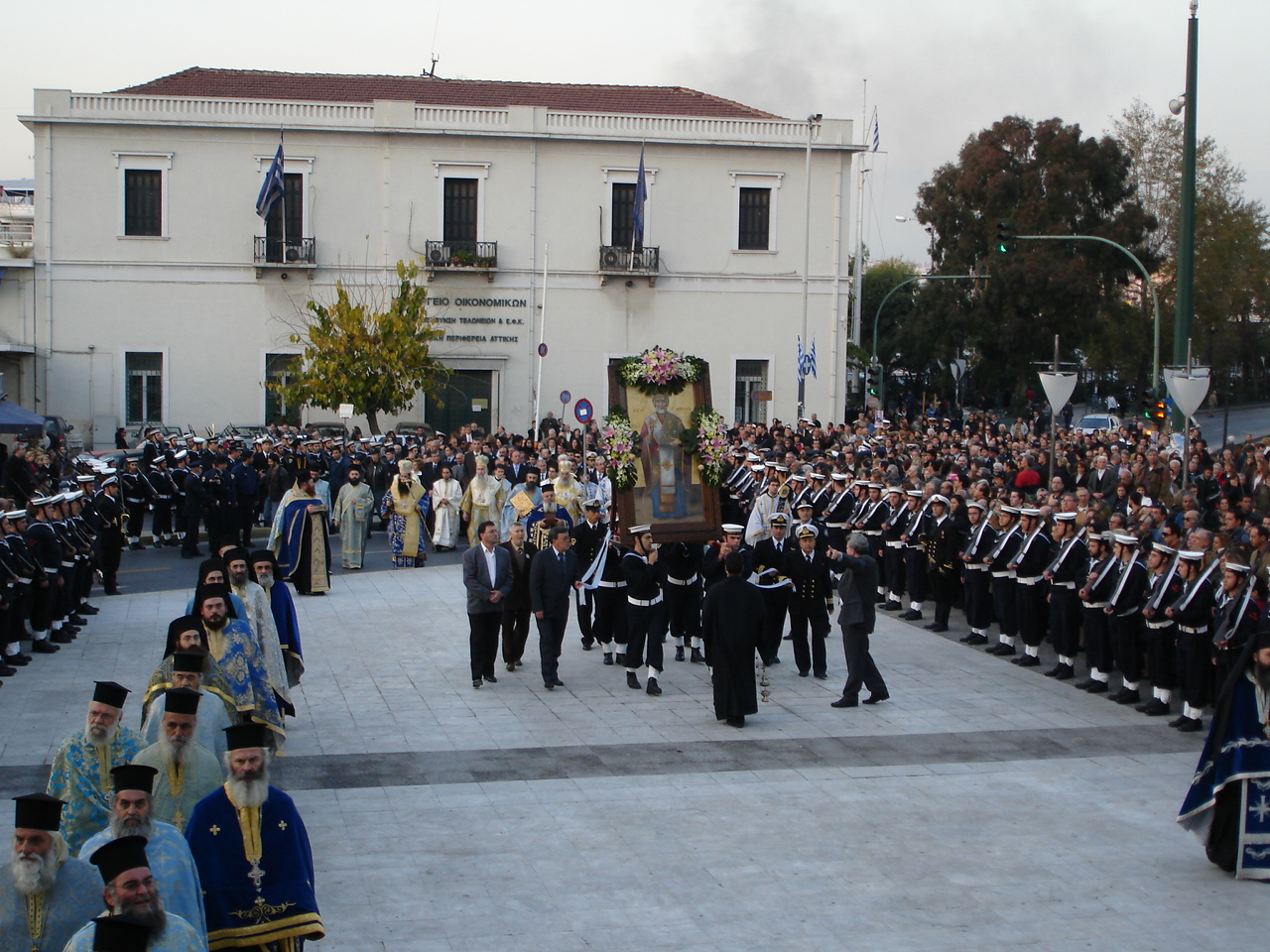
Lity procession on the Feast of Saint Nicholas in Piraeus, Greece

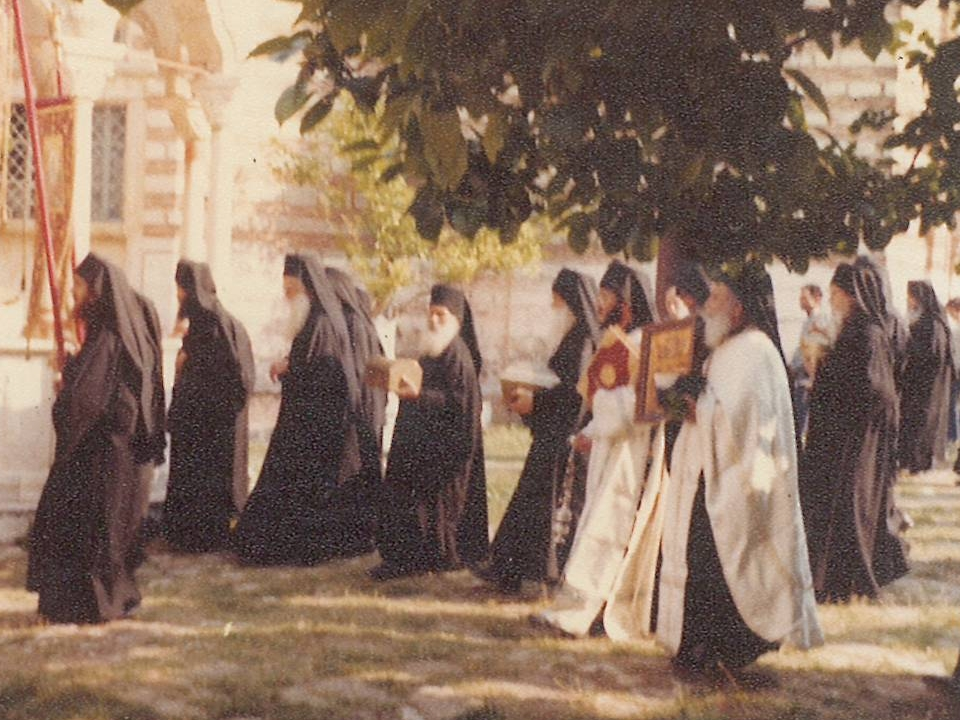
procession to behind the katholikon for the Lesser Blessing of Waters following an all-night vigil on Mount Athos at Esphigmenou Monastery on its patron feast, the Ascension

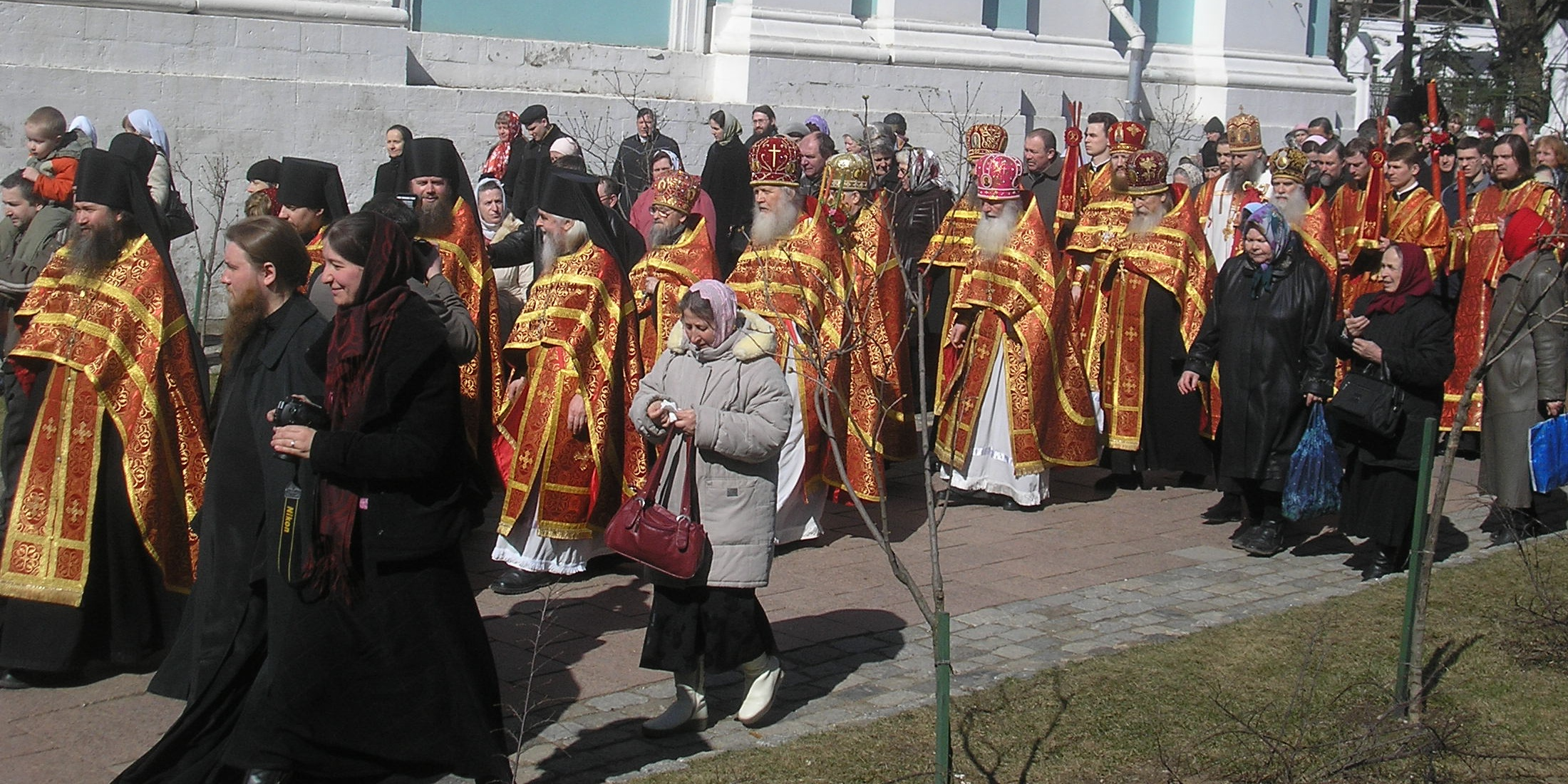
pascal procession on Bright Tuesday (Easter Tuesday) at the Trinity Lavra of St. Sergius in Sergiev Posad, Russia

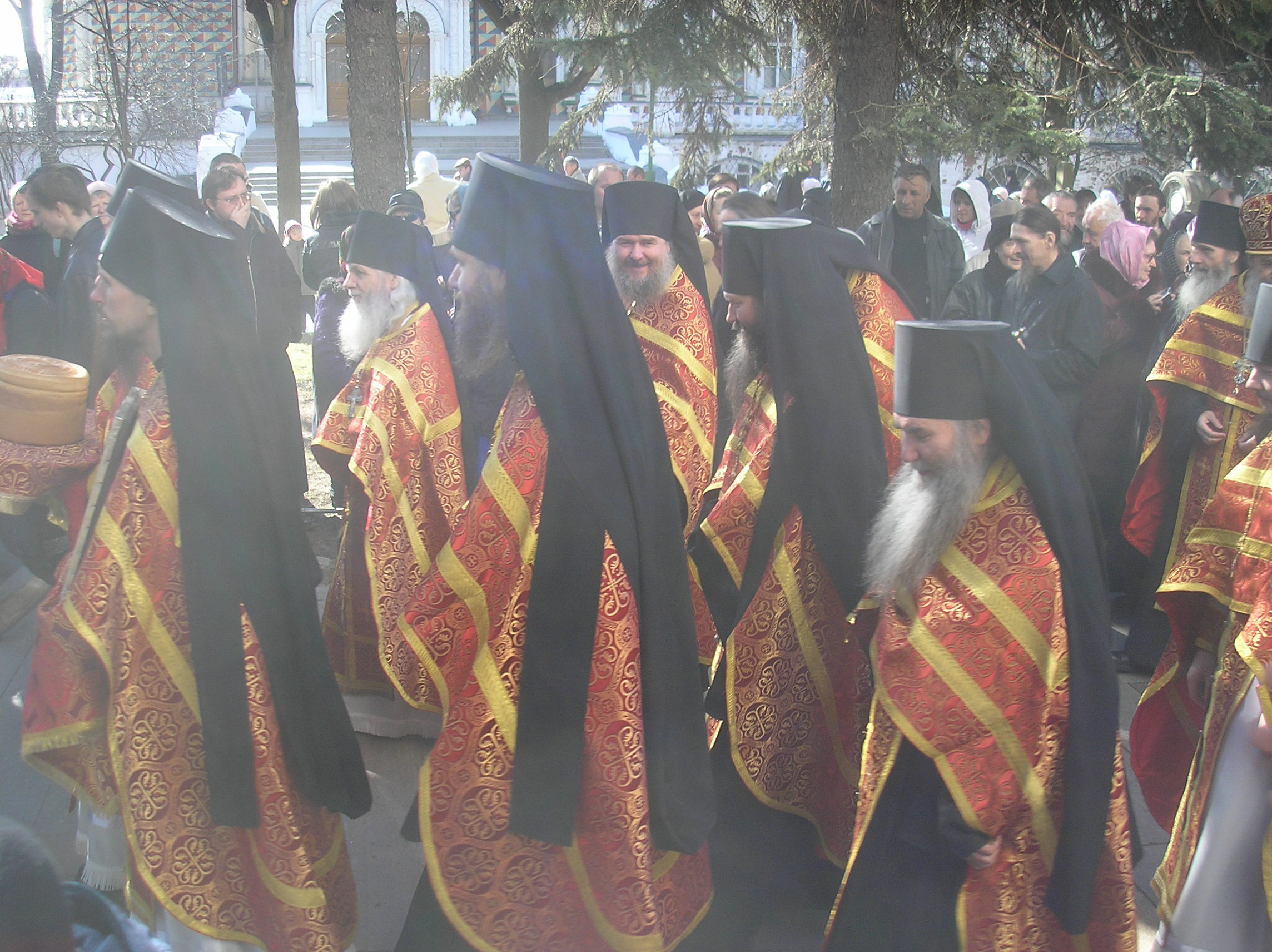
Priests in the pascal procession on Bright Tuesday (Easter Tuesday) at the Trinity Lavra of St. Sergius in Sergiev Posad, Russia

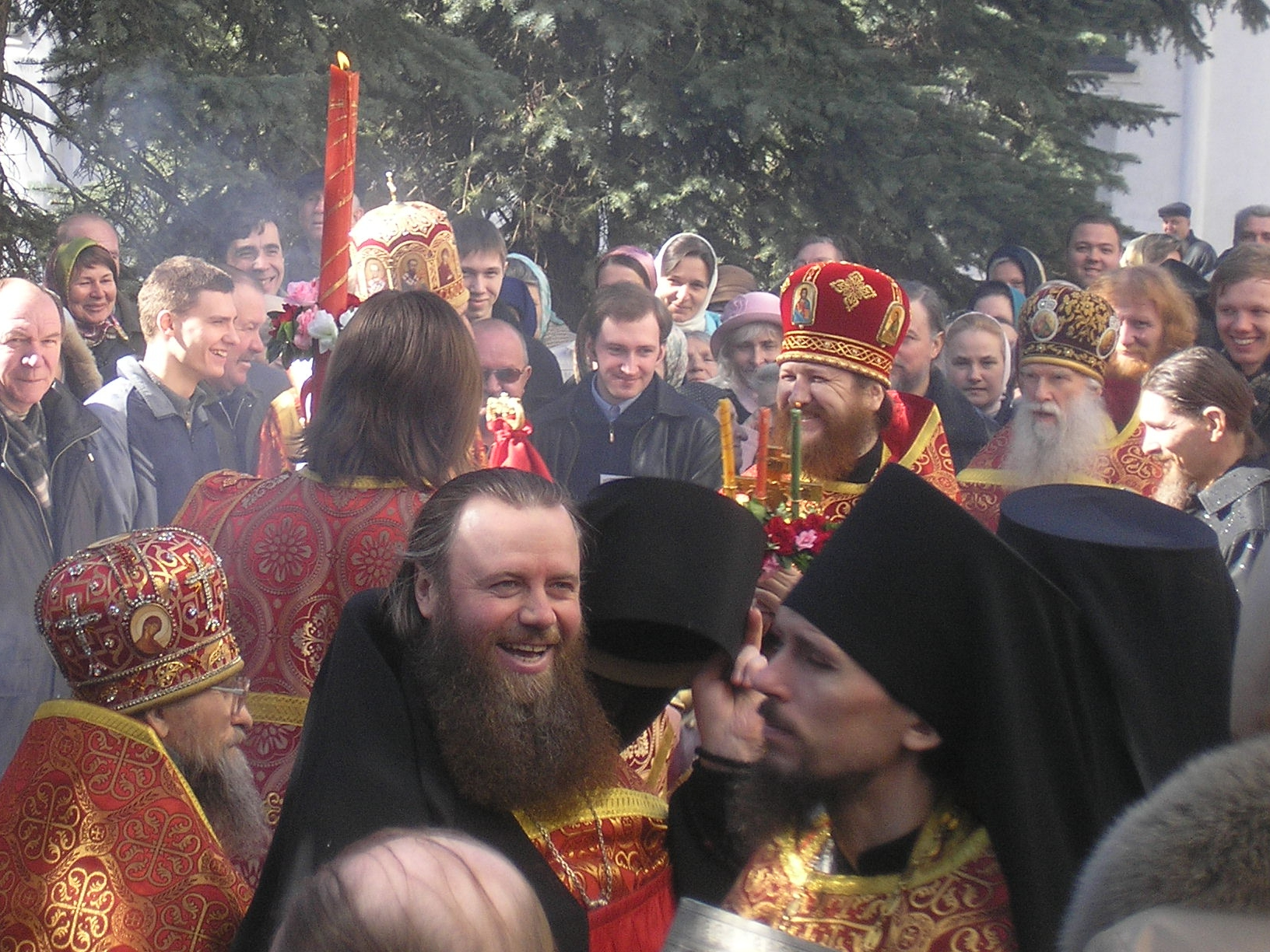
A stop for reading the Gospel and blessing with holy water during the pascal procession on Bright Tuesday (Easter Tuesday) at the Trinity Lavra of St. Sergius in Sergiev Posad, Russia

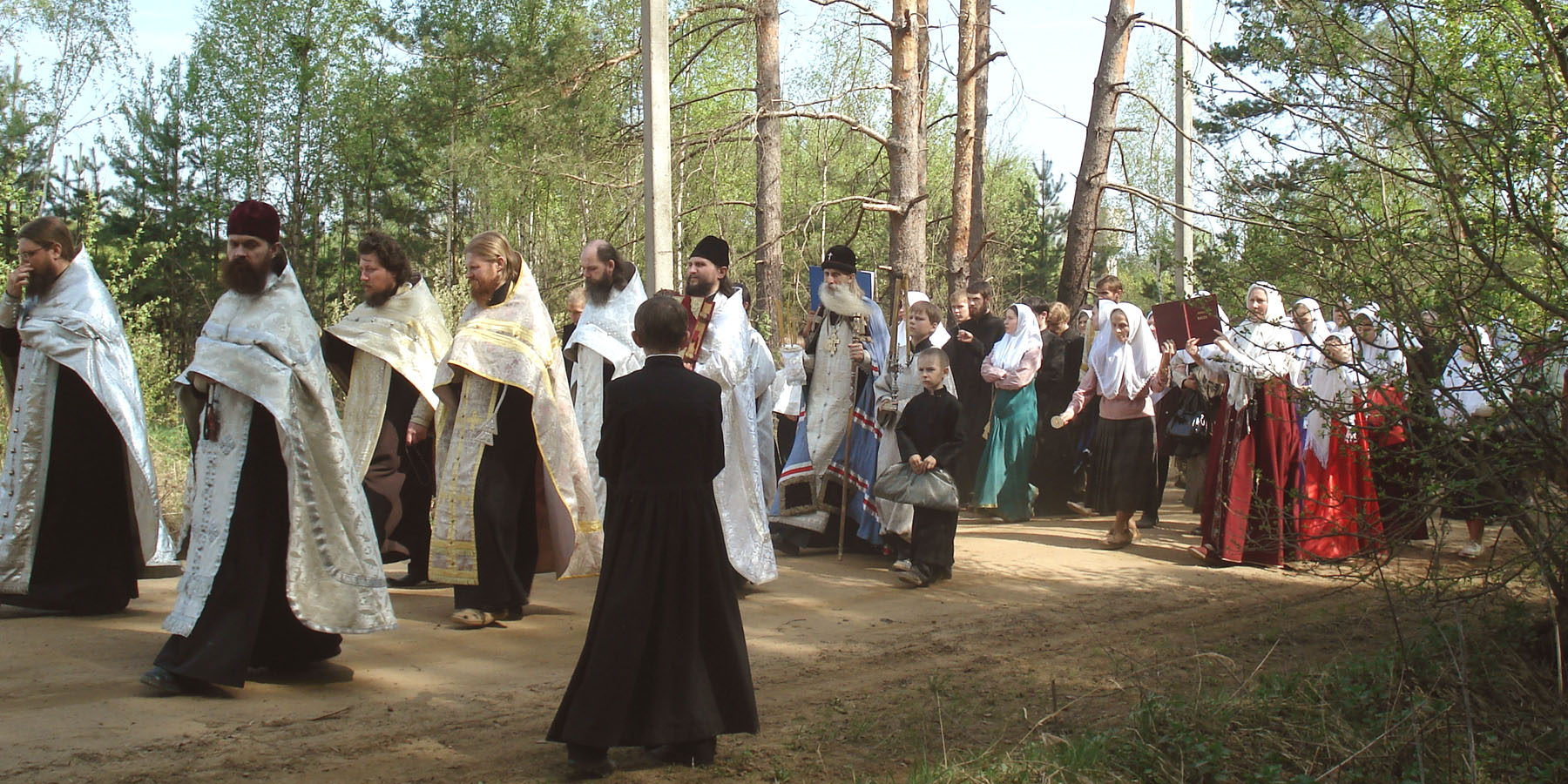
Russian Orthodox Old-Rite Church paschal procession in Guslitsa. Moscow region. May 2, 2008.

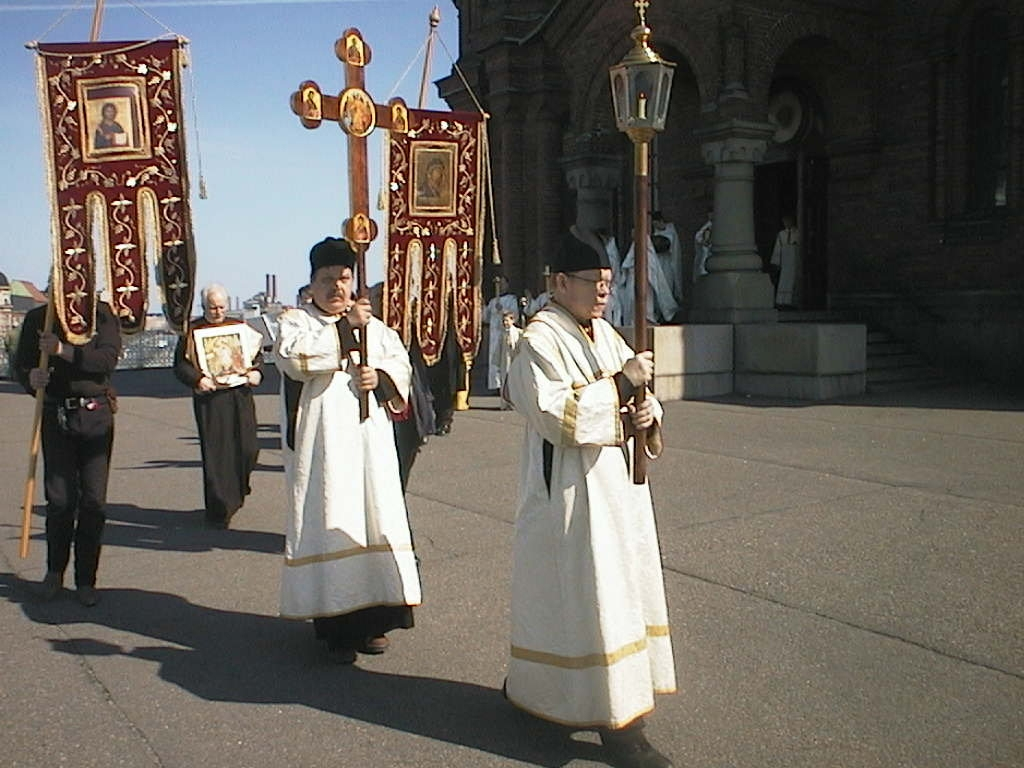
Finnish Orthodox procession

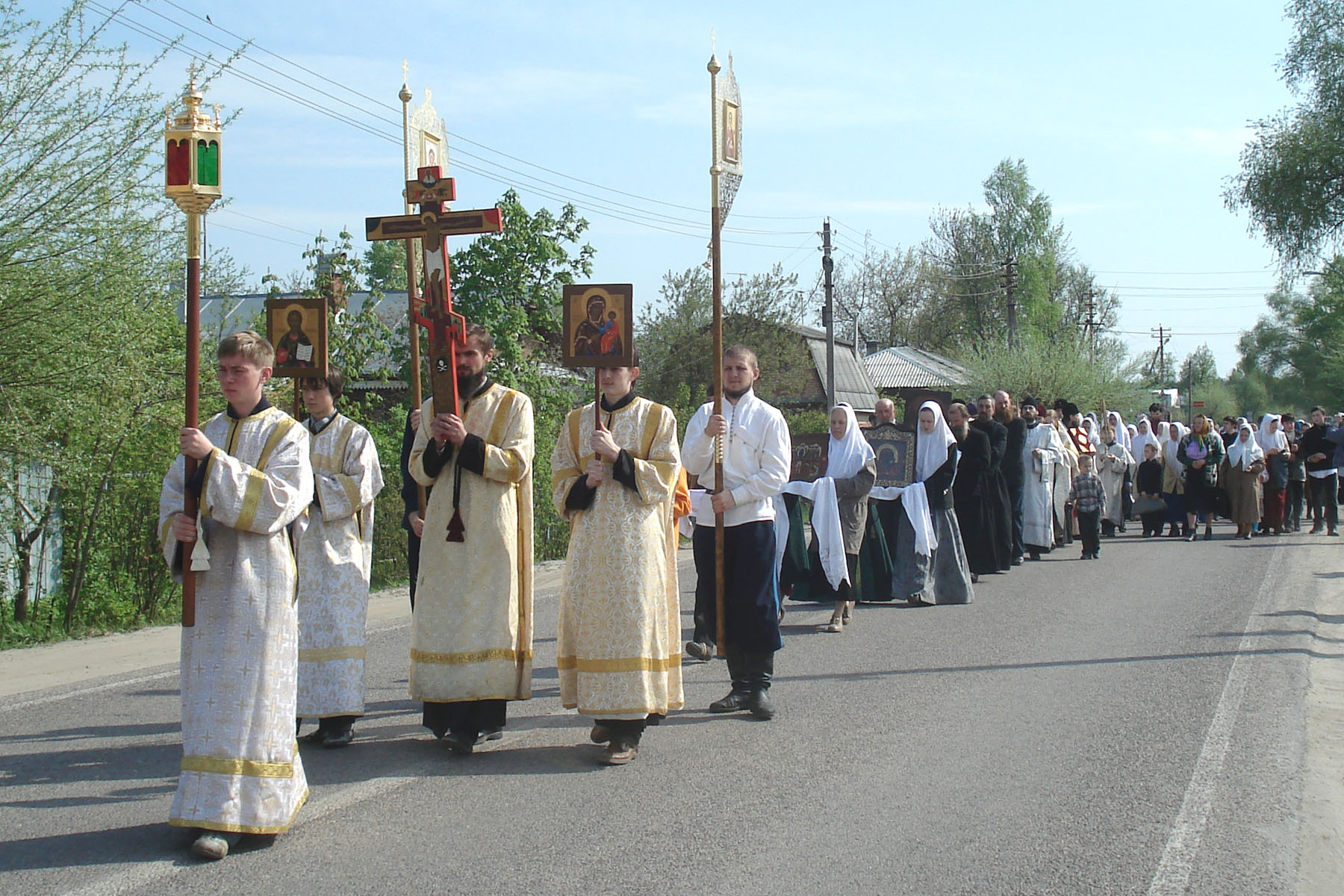
Paschal procession by Russian Orthodox Old-Rite Church in Guslitsa, Moscow region

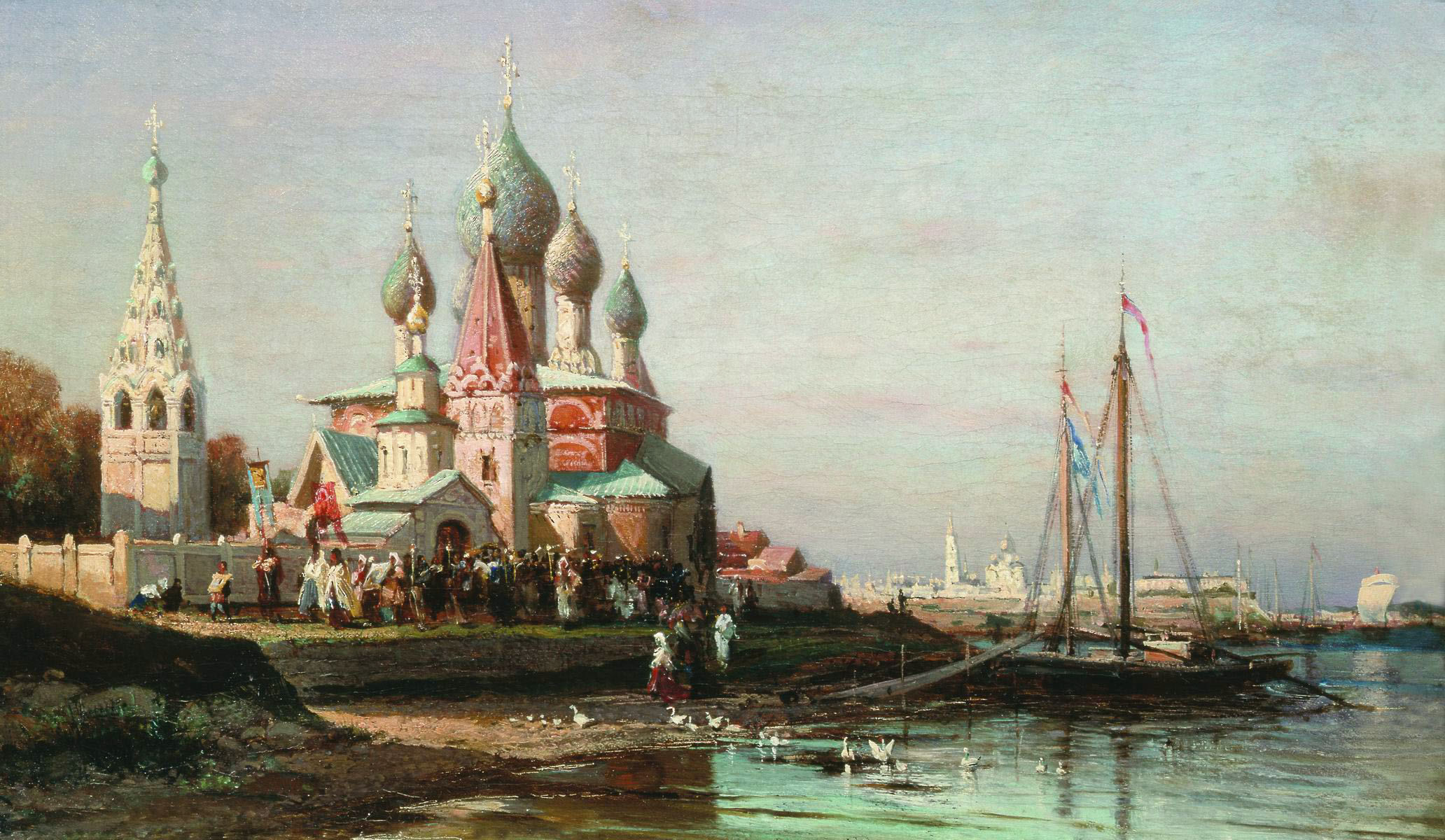
Procession in Yaroslavl by Alexey Bogolyubov, 1863

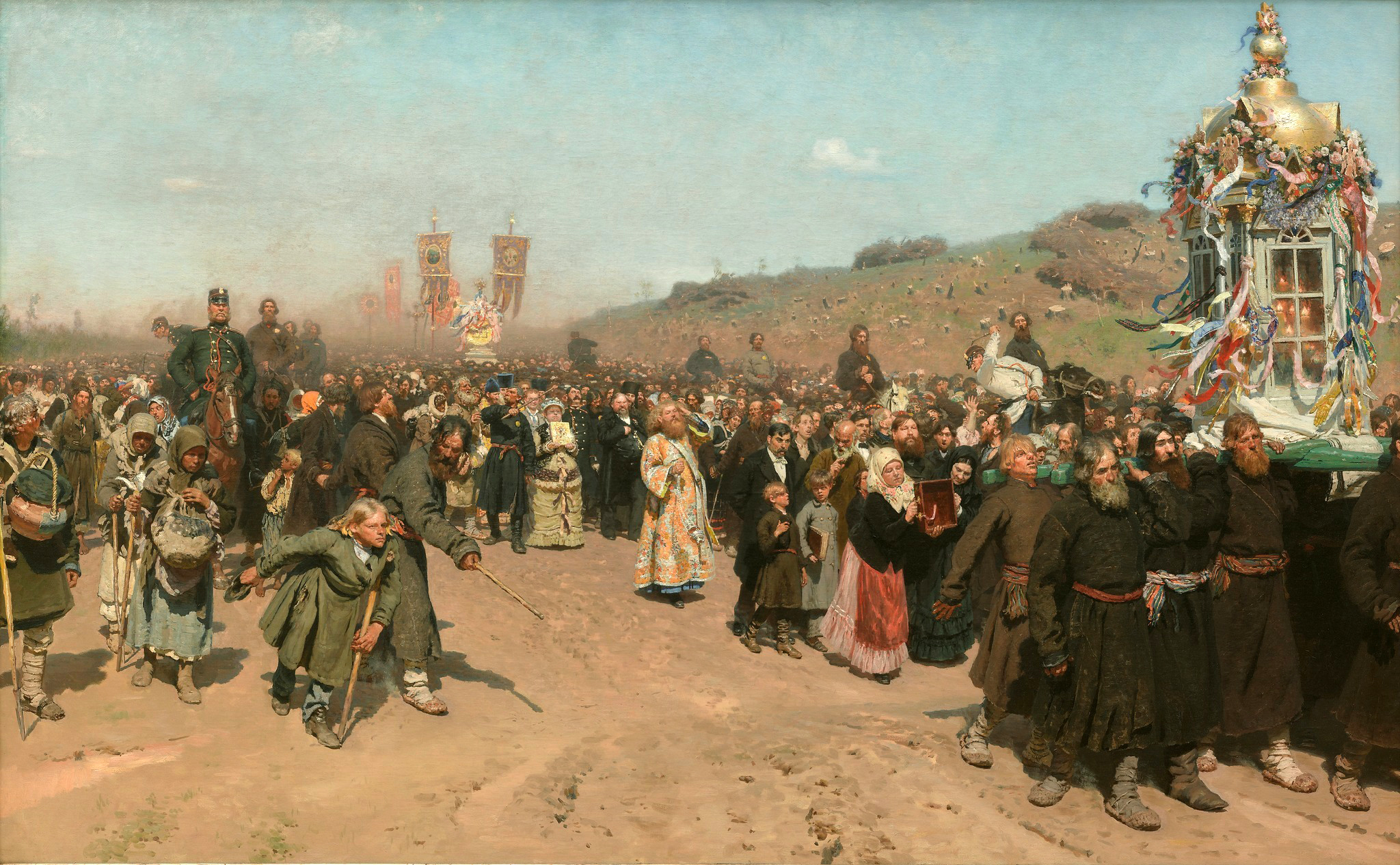
Religious Procession in Kursk Province, Bright Week procession with the icon of Our Lady of Kursk (in shrine, at right), as painted by Ilya Repin, 1880-83 (State Tretyakov Gallery, Moscow)

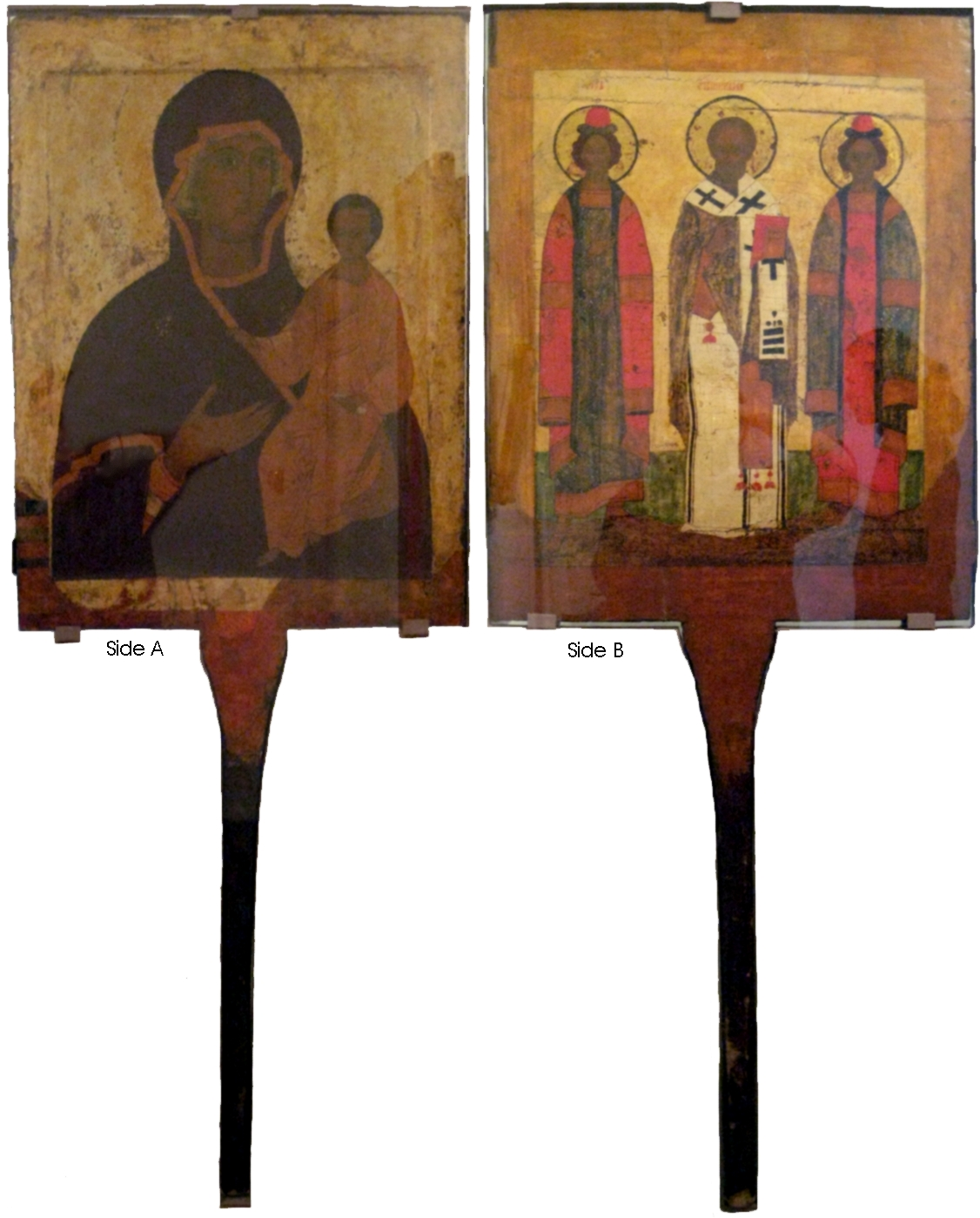
Two-sided portable icon for a procession (A. Our Lady of Smolensk. B. Ss. Nicolas, princes Boris and Gleb) (Russia, 16th century)

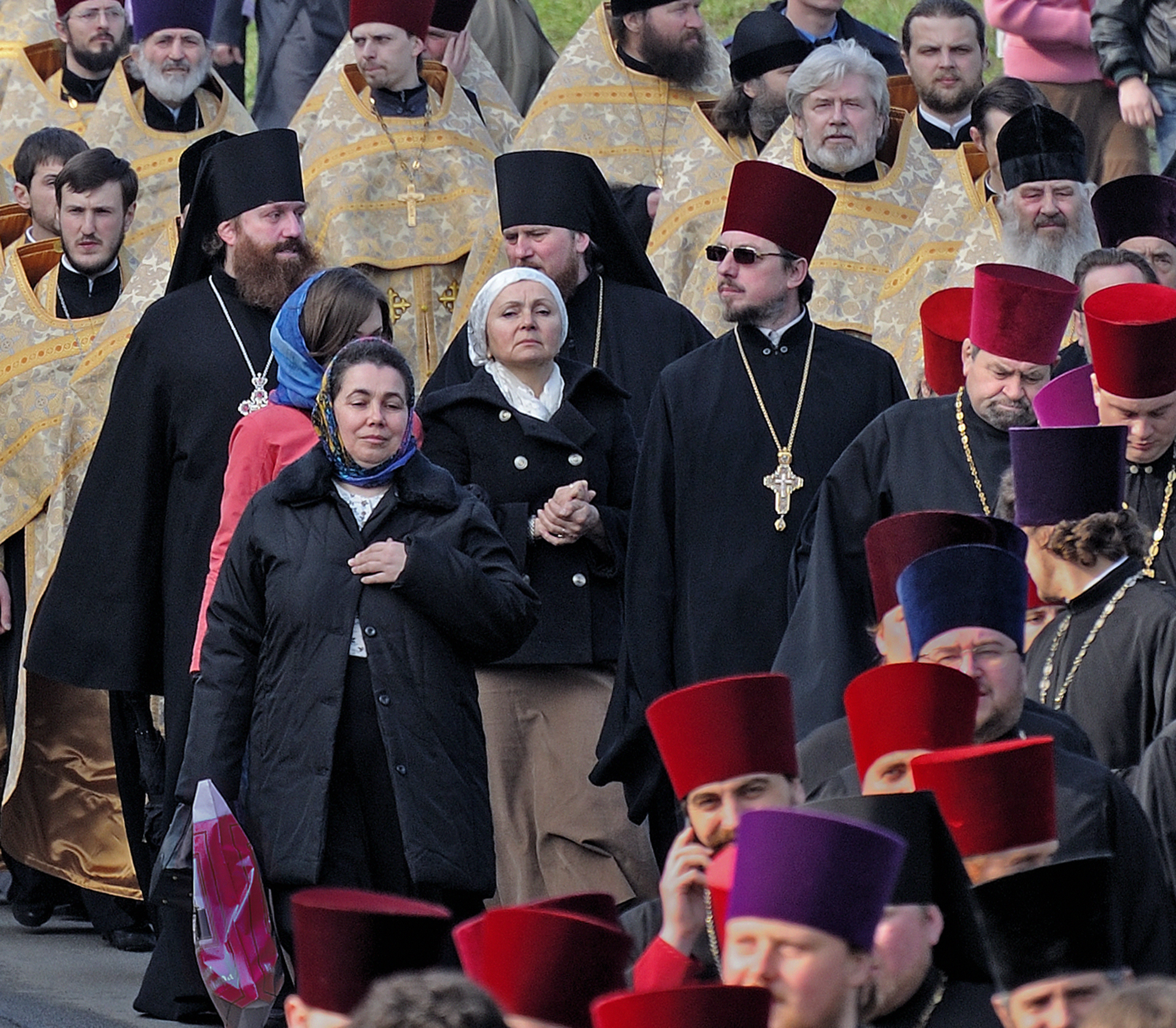
Russian Orthodox Church procession in Kyiv. 2010

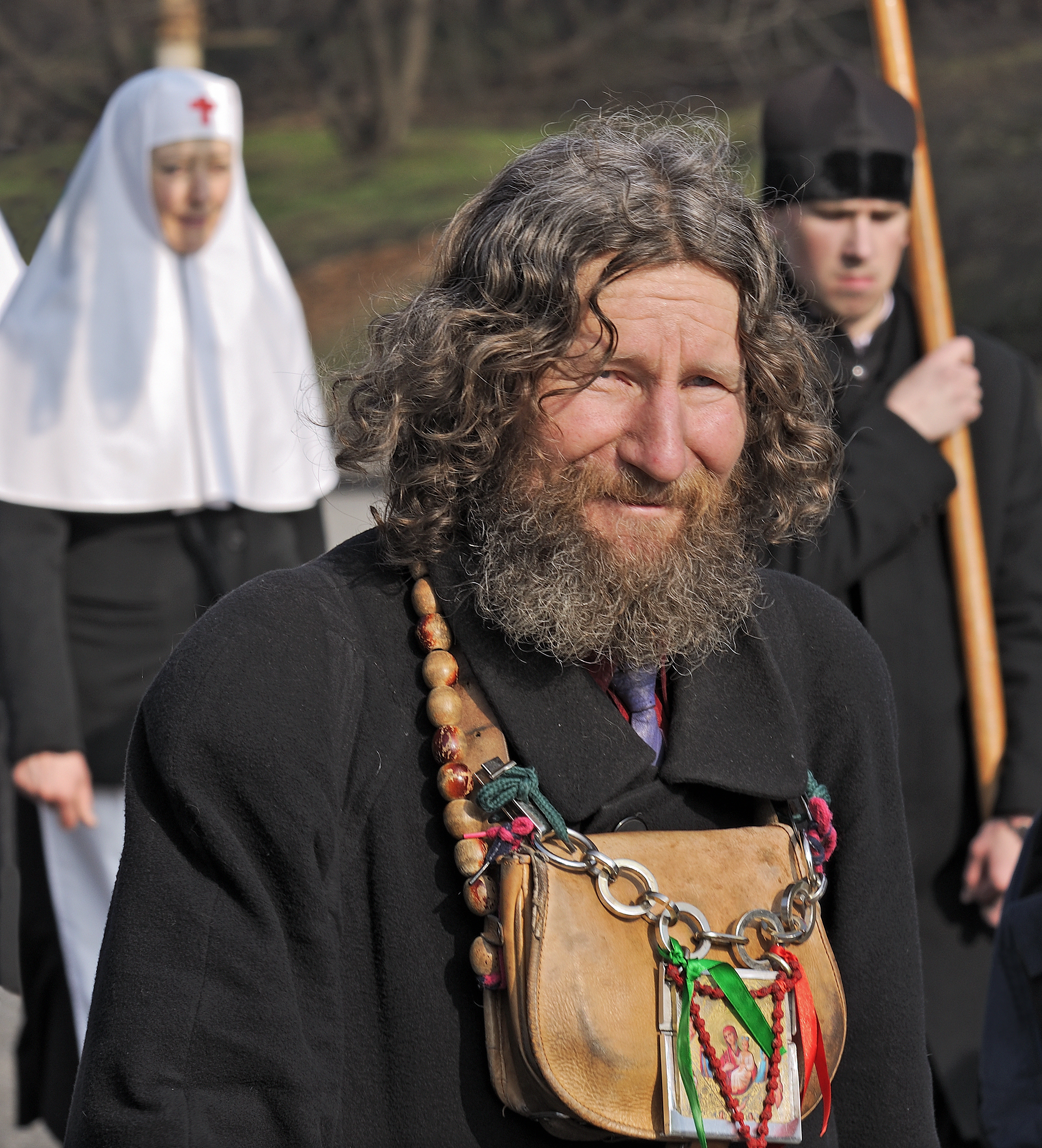
Russian Orthodox Church procession participant in Kyiv. 2010

=== Oriental Orthodox ===
==== Gallery of Oriental Orthodox processions ====
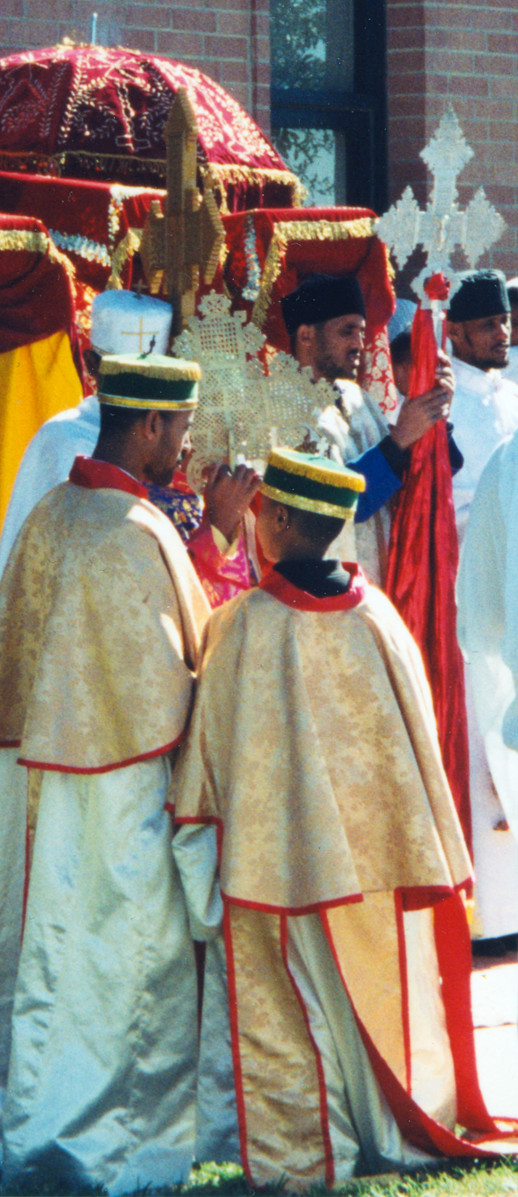
Ethiopian Orthodox clergy lead a procession in celebration of Saint Michael. During such processions, the clergy carry Ethiopian processional crosses and ornately covered tabots around the church building's exterior (Garland, Texas)

=== Reformed ===
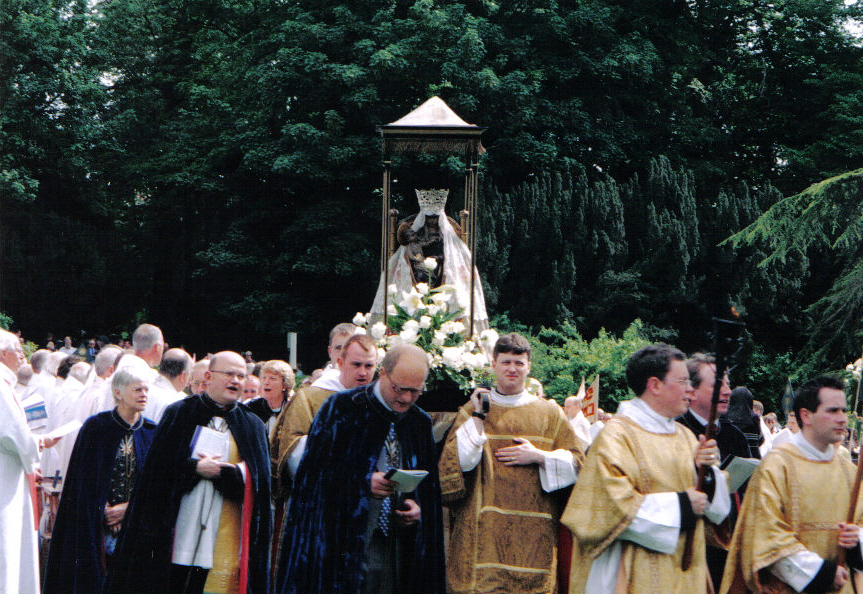
Procession with the statue of the Blessed Virgin, Anglican National Pilgrimage at Walsingham, 2003

The Reformed Churches abolished those processions associated with the doctrine of transubstantiation (Corpus Christi); the Sacrament of the Lord's Supper, according to the 28th Article of Religion of the Church of England was not by Christ's ordinance reserved, carried about, lifted up, or worshiped. It also abolished those associated with the cult of the Blessed Virgin and the saints. The stern simplicity of Calvinism, indeed, would not tolerate religious processions of any kind, and from the Reformed Churches they vanished altogether. Though aligned with Reformed theology, the more conservative temper of the Anglican churches, however, suffered the retention of such processions as did not conflict with the reformed doctrines, though even in these Churches they met with opposition and tended after a while to fall into disuse. Liturgical processions were revived in the Church of England by the members of the Oxford Movement during the 19th century. In Ritual Notes, an Anglo-Catholic liturgical manual, it is stated that "A solemn procession as part of the ceremony proper to the occasion, is ordered to be held respectively at Candlemas; on Palm Sunday; at the Rogations (i.e. on April 25th and the three days preceding Ascension); and on Corpus Christi ..." "A procession is a distinct act of worship in itself, though it is desirable (and accords with ancient practice) that it should have a definite purpose, such as to commemorate some notable event, or to honour the Blessed Sacrament".

== Processions in art ==
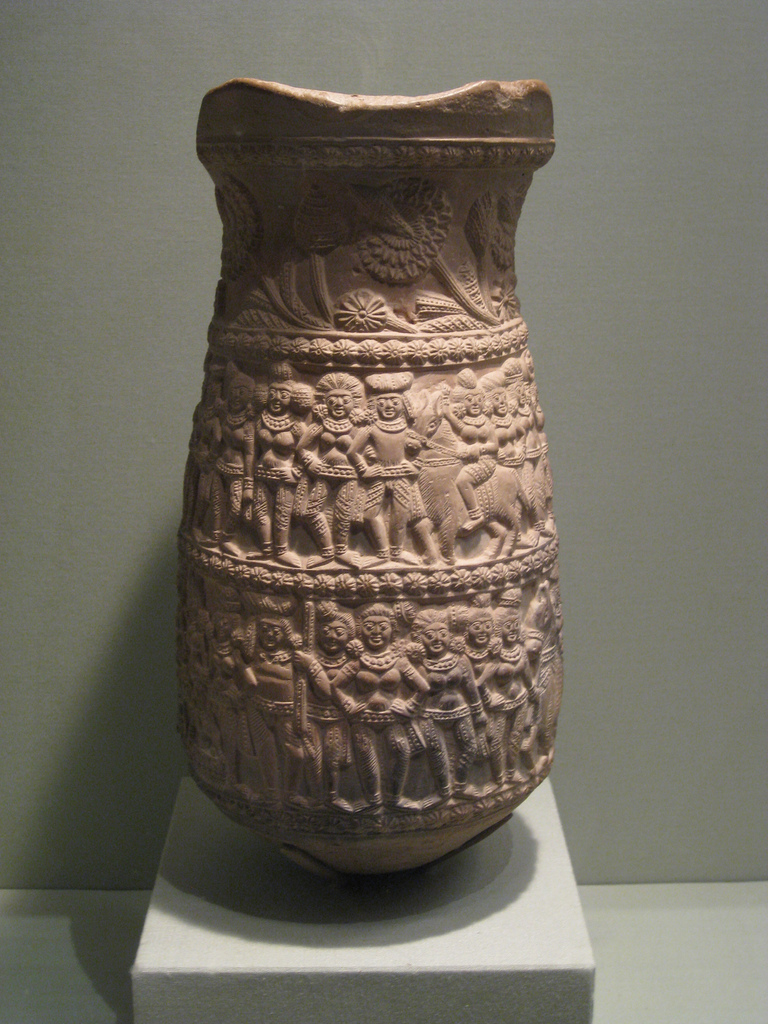
Vase with Processional Scenes, West Bengal/Chandraketugarh, circa 100 BC

The wealth of display associated with processions makes them a rich subject for literary and visual art. Some examples include:

- Processions were popular subjects for the Romantic painters of the late 19th and early 20th centuries. Fantastical Ludwig II of Bavaria was the subject of Sleigh Ride by Wenig. Spring, a painting by Sir Lawrence Alma-Tadema, displays a romanticized Roman procession, while his Finding of Moses shows an heiress of the Pharaoh proceeding to the palace with her entourage. The exotic Queen of Sheba's Visit to King Solomon by Edward Poynter touches on a longstanding convention of elaborate processions from "the East". Walter Crane depicted Beauty being escorted by wigged monkeys in his 1874 Beauty and the Beast.
- the processions of Tarkhaans and Tarkheenas are emblematic of Tashbaan's wealth and glamour in the book The Horse and His Boy by C. S. Lewis

=== In film ===
- elaborate Chinese wedding processions feature in the films Crouching Tiger, Hidden Dragon and The Last Emperor
- in the film Pillow Book, the heroine compares her wedding procession with the procession of a Heian Period empress. In another film by the same director, Peter Greenaway, the act of Prospero simply walking through his house becomes a lush, visual procession because of the house's wealth of literary and visual symbolism.
- the Buddha discovers death, old age, and poverty while watching an elaborate procession in the film Little Buddha
- the Nazi entourage in Raiders of the Lost Ark, upon arriving at their island base, begin an elaborate trek to the centre of the island, with soldiers holding aloft National Socialist standards. The procession is somewhat ostentatious given the climate, prompting the black-dressed Gestapo agent to remove his hat and wipe the sweat from his brow.
- the film Jefferson in Paris includes a scene during which Thomas Jefferson and his daughter watch one of the daily processions that make up the royal ritual at Versailles

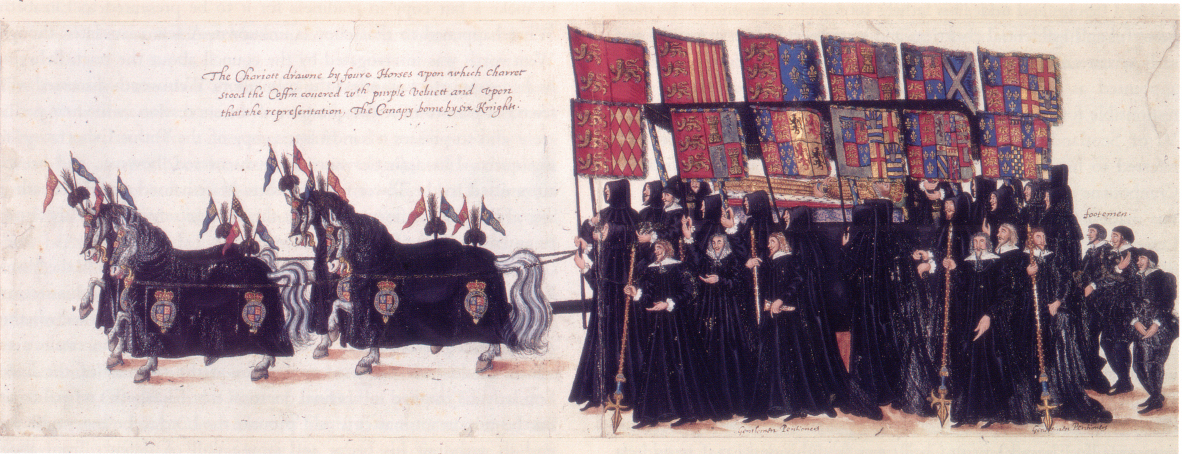
Illustration of part of the funeral procession of Queen Elizabeth I

- the funeral procession of Elizabeth I of England is portrayed in the film Orlando
- the triumphal procession of Helen and Paris into Troy begins the 2004 film of the same name
- a spectacular procession introduces Prince Akeem's appointed bride in the film Coming to America

Fantasy

- a utopian parade is depicted by James Gurney in his Dinosaur Parade
- Processions appear in several Star Wars films, including award ceremonies at the end of The Phantom Menace and A New Hope, a funeral procession at the end of Revenge of the Sith, and a military procession during Return of the Jedi
- the god Ra appears in a formal procession shortly before being overthrown in the film Stargate
- the procession of Audrey Hepburn as an Italian princess sets up the dilemma of her character at the beginning of the film Roman Holiday
- the procession of Prince Ali in the Disney film Aladdin allows the hero to show off his newfound prestige
- the procession of the wicked Skeksis into their regeneration chamber, and the following procession of their spiritual counterparts, the Mystics, marks the climax of the film The Dark Crystal

=== In music ===
- The opera Aida is known for its triumphal procession in Act II. The first staging included a live elephant on stage.

== See also ==
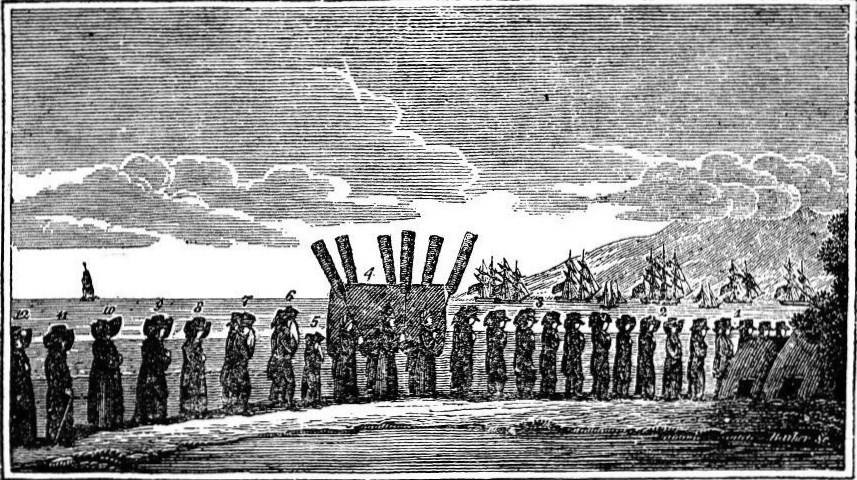
The funeral procession of Queen Keopuolani of the Sandwich Islands (also known as the Hawaiian Islands)

- Cavalcade
- Funeral procession
- Parade
- Processional hymn
- Processional walkway
- Statio
- Uthsavar
- Good Friday processions in Baliuag
- March for Jesus
- List of Veiled Prophet Parade themes, St. Louis, Missouri
