= Pyotr Shamshin =

Russian painter

- Пётр Михайлович Шамшин
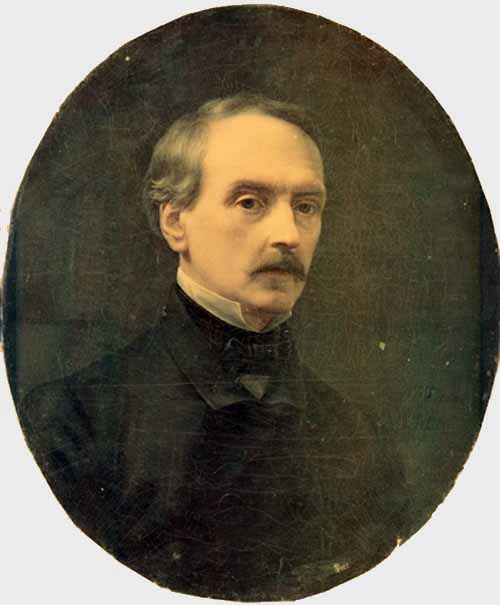
- Self-Portrait, 1867, oils; Russian Museum
- Born: January 10, 1811; Saint Petersburg
- Died: February 6, 1895 (aged 84); Saint Petersburg
- Resting place: Smolensky Cemetery, St. Petersburg
- Education: Member Academy of Arts (1844); Professor by rank (1853); Imperial Academy of Arts (1838)
- Known for: History painting
- Awards: Big Gold Medal of the Imperial Academy of Arts (1836)

Pyotr Mikhailovich Shamshin (Russian: Пётр Михайлович Шамшин; (10 January 1811 – 6 February 1895) was a Russian painter in the Academical style, active in St. Petersburg during Tsars Nicholas I through Alexander III's reigns, primarily known for his history paintings.

== Biography ==
His father, Mikhail Nikitich Shamshin, was a portrait painter who taught at the Imperial Academy of Arts. At the age of ten, he entered the primary school at the Academy and studied under Alexei Yegorov and Vasily Shebuyev, with Pyotr Basin joining much later. In 1836, he was awarded a large gold medal for his depiction of the massacre of Niobe's children by Artemis and Apollo.

He graduated in 1838 with the title of "Artist" and a small gold medal for a scene from the Iliad. His title included a stipend to study abroad, so he went to Italy and remained there for seven years. After returning, he became a teacher at the Academy. He was elected an Imperial Academician in 1844 for his paintings of Hagar in the desert and Peter the Great rescuing drowning soldiers near his estate in Lakhta; an act that probably hastened Peter's death.

He was awarded the title of Professor in 1853 for his version of the Resurrection. Six years later, due to changes in the Academy's charter, he was redesignated as an "Associate Professor". In 1863, he became a "Professor, First Degree". After holding that position for twenty years, he was named the Rector for painting and sculpture. Among his best-known students were Isaak Asknaziy, Vasily Savinsky, Viktor Bobrov and Vasily Smirnov. Shortly before his death, due to a new statute for the Academy, he was dismissed because of age. His burial, at the Smolensky Cemetery, was lost during the Soviet era.

Most of his works were religious in nature and may be seen at Saint Isaac's Cathedral and the Cathedral of Christ the Saviour. He also painted for smaller churches throughout Russia, but some of those works were lost or destroyed during the early Soviet period.

== Selected paintings ==
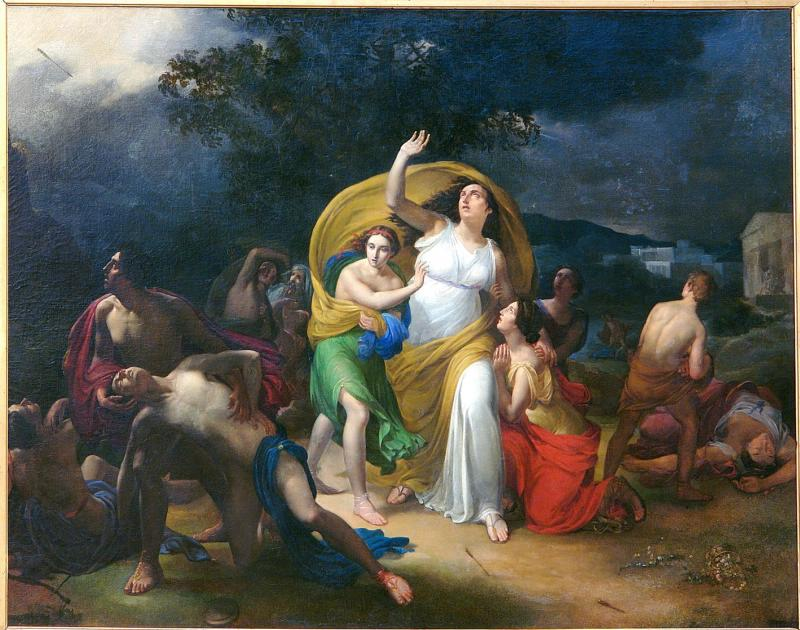
Massacre of the Niobids, 1836; Yaroslavl Art Museum

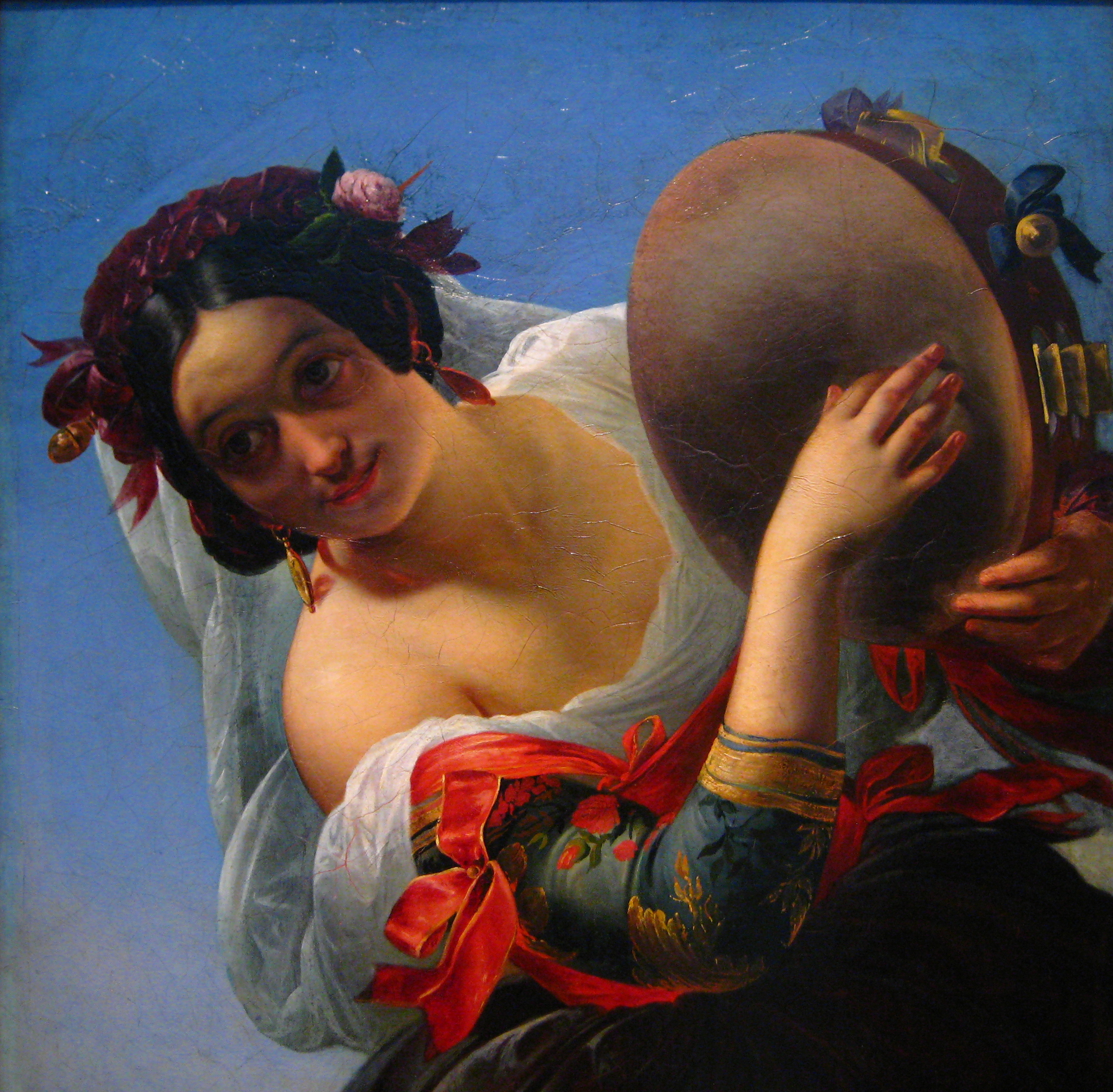
Female Dancer from Trastavere, 1840; Tretyakov Gallery, formerly in the Rumyantsev Museum, once owned by Feodor Pryanishnikov

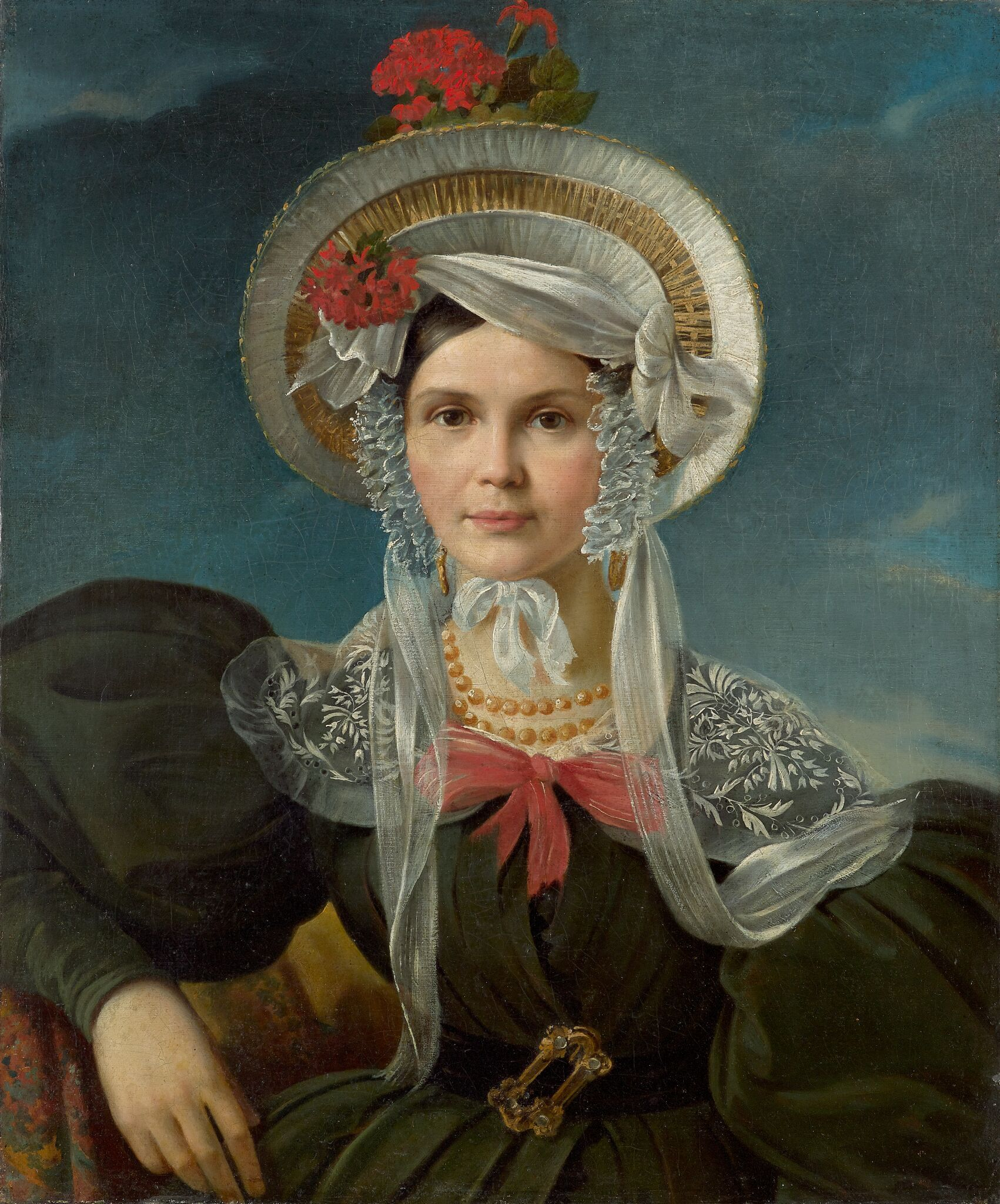
Portrait of an Unknown Lady, supposed to be of Yelizaveta Krivtsova (née Princess Repnina-Volkonskaya), c. 1842; Tretyakov Gallery

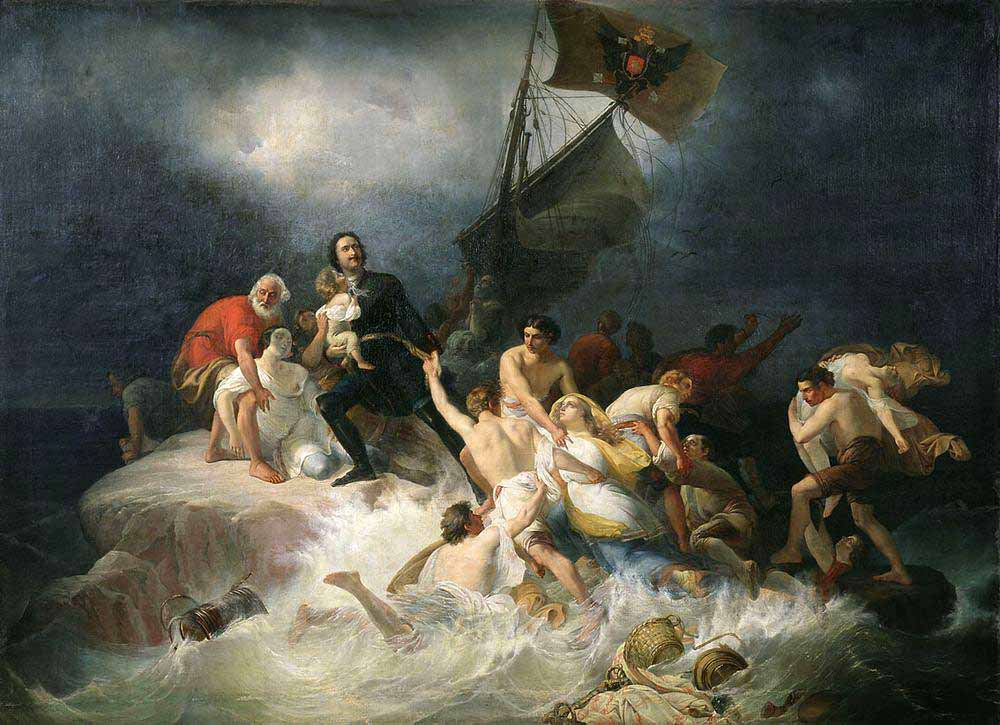
Peter the Great's Exploit at Lakhta, 1844; Fine Arts Museum, Odesa

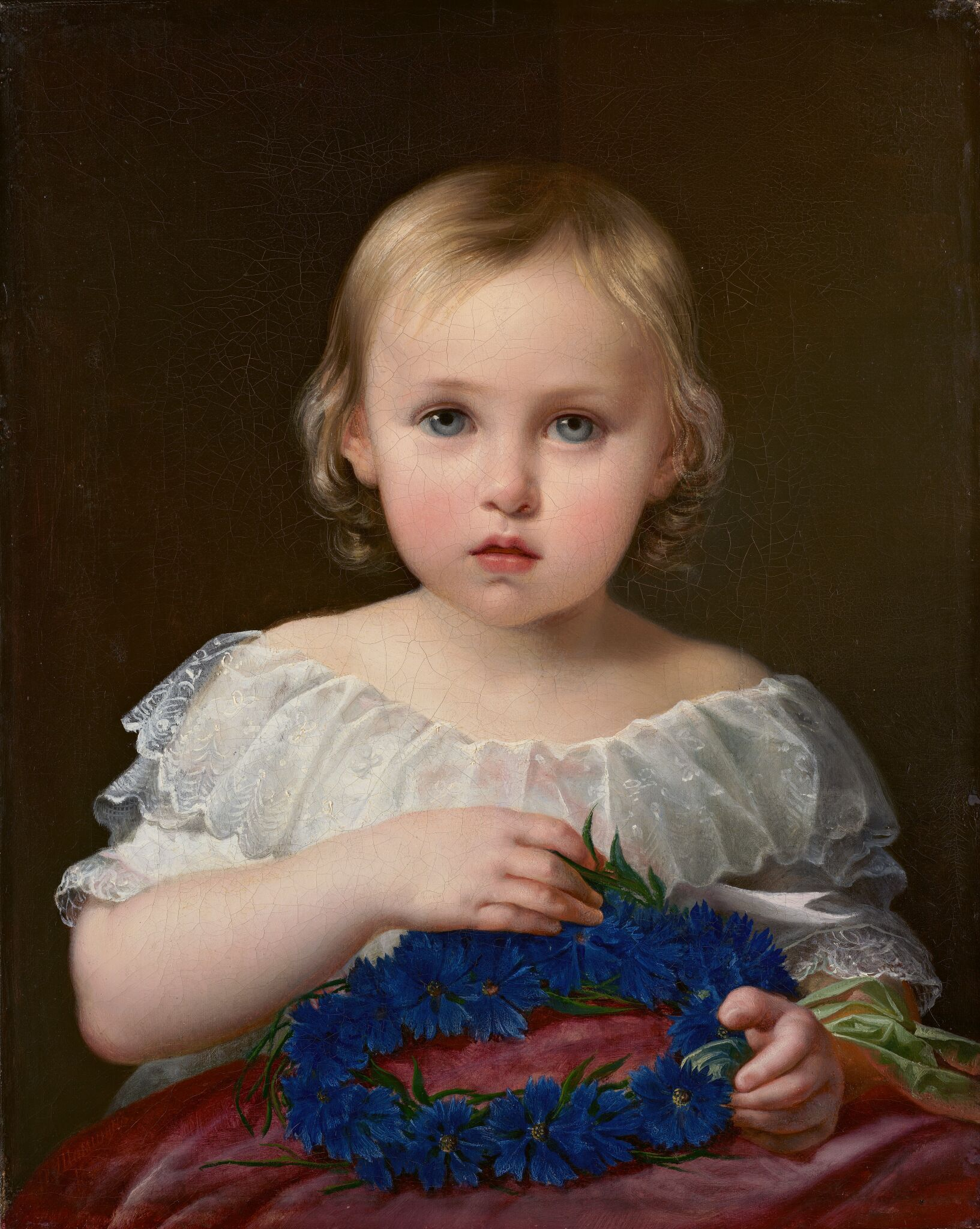
Yekaterina Junge (née Countess Tolstaya) as child, 1845; Tretyakov Gallery, acquired by Pavel Tretyakov in 1895, previously owned by Kozma Soldatyonkov

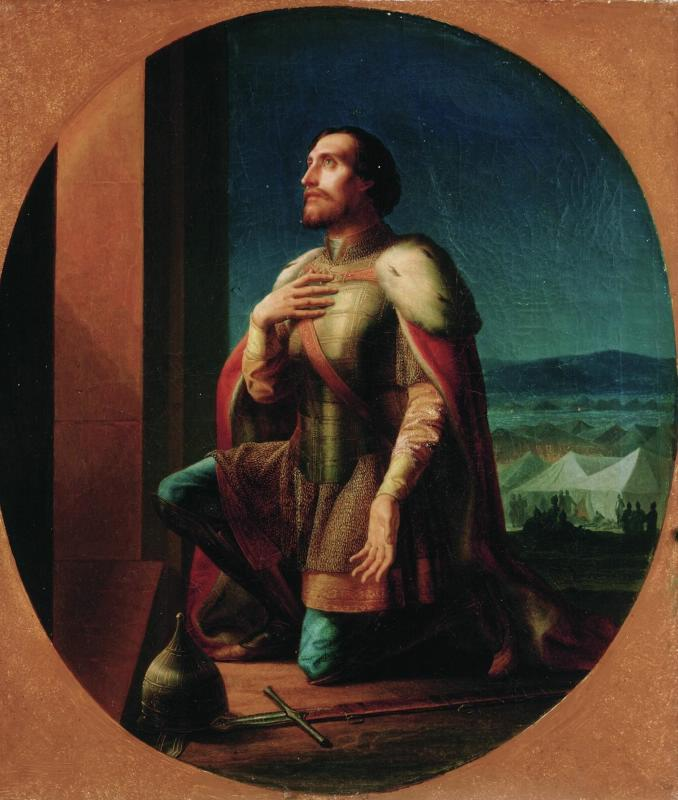
Alexander Nevsky's Prayer Before a Campaign, 1855; Vyatka Art Museum, Kirov, Kirov Oblast, formerly in the Rumyantsev Museum

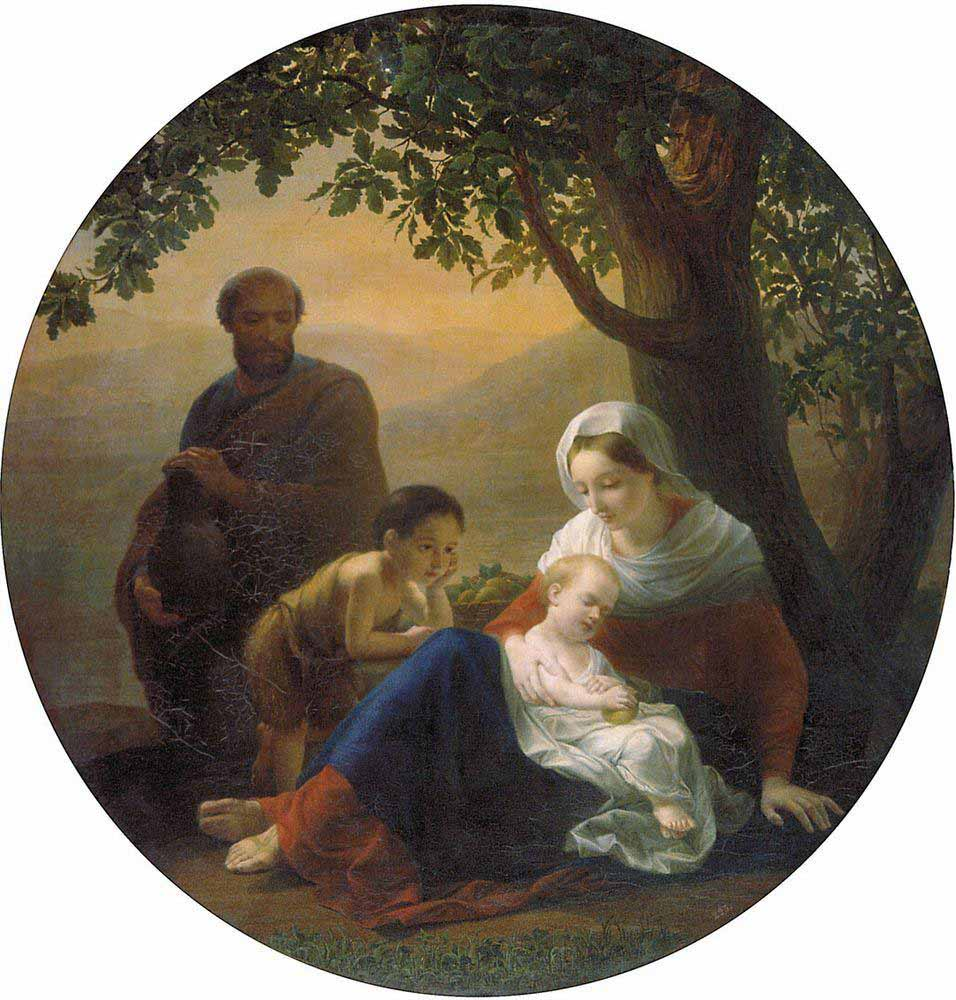
Holy Family, 1858; Russian Museum

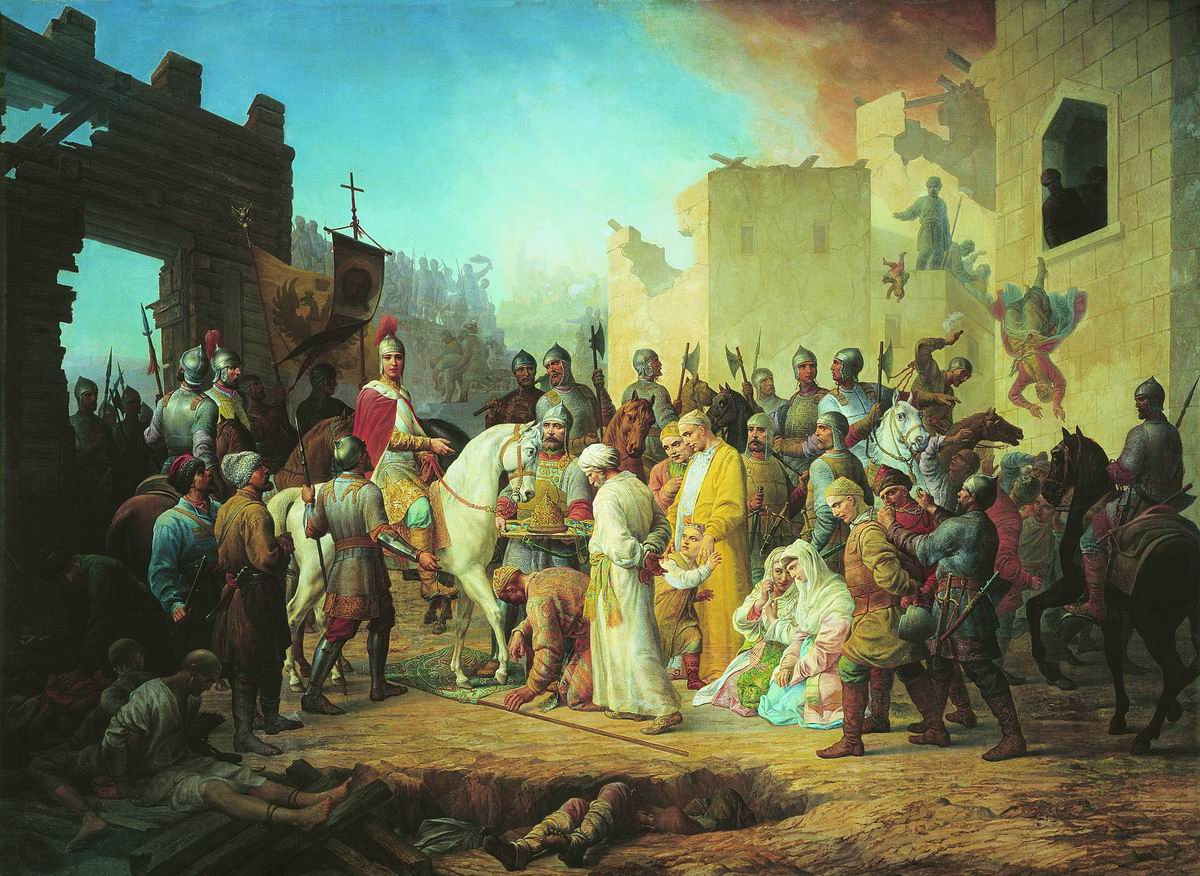
Tsar Ivan IV Enters Kazan, 1894; Vereshchagin Art Museum, Mykolaiv
