= Shtetl =

Eastern-European town with a predominantly Jewish population

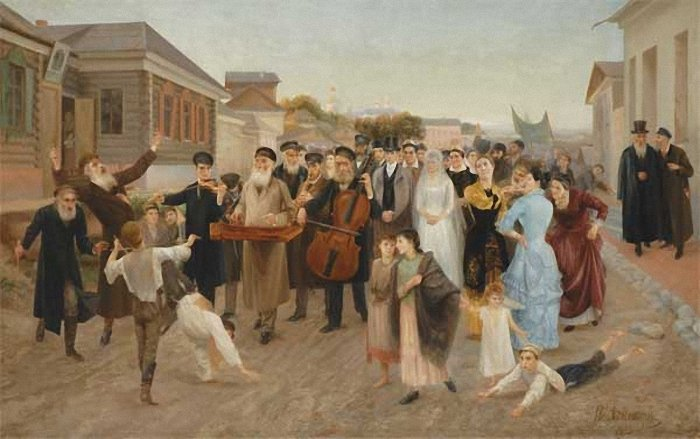
An 1893 painting by the artist Isaak Asknaziy of a Jewish wedding with a klezmer band in a shtetl

Shtetl or shtetel (English: /ˈʃtɛtəl/ SHTET-əl; Yiddish: שטעטל, romanized: shtetl, pronounced [ʃtɛtl̩]; pl. שטעטעלעך shtetelekh) is a Yiddish term for small towns with substantial Ashkenazi Jewish populations that existed in Eastern Europe before the Holocaust. The term is used in the context of pre-Second World War European Jewish societies as communities within the surrounding non-Jewish populace, and thus bears certain connotations of discrimination. Shtetls (or shtetels, shtetlach, shtetelach or shtetlekh) were mainly found in the areas that constituted the 19th-century Pale of Settlement in the Russian Empire (constituting modern-day Belarus, Lithuania, Moldova, Ukraine, Poland, Latvia and Russia), as well as in Congress Poland, Austrian Galicia and Bukovina, the Kingdom of Romania and the Kingdom of Hungary.

In Yiddish, a larger city, like Lviv or Chernivtsi, is called a shtot (Yiddish: שטאָט), and a village is called a dorf (Yiddish: דאָרף). Shtetl is a diminutive of shtot with the meaning 'little town'. Despite the existence of Jewish self-administration (kehilla/kahal), officially there were no separate Jewish municipalities, and the shtetl was referred to as a miasteczko or miestelis (mestechko, in Russian bureaucracy), a type of settlement which originated in the former Polish–Lithuanian Commonwealth and was formally recognized in the Russian Empire as well. For clarification, the expression "Jewish miasteczko" was often used.

The shtetl as a phenomenon of Ashkenazi Jews in Eastern Europe was destroyed by the Nazis during the Holocaust. The term is sometimes used to describe largely Jewish communities in the United States, such as existed on the Lower East Side of New York City in the early 20th century, and predominantly Hasidic communities such as Kiryas Joel and New Square today.

== Overview ==
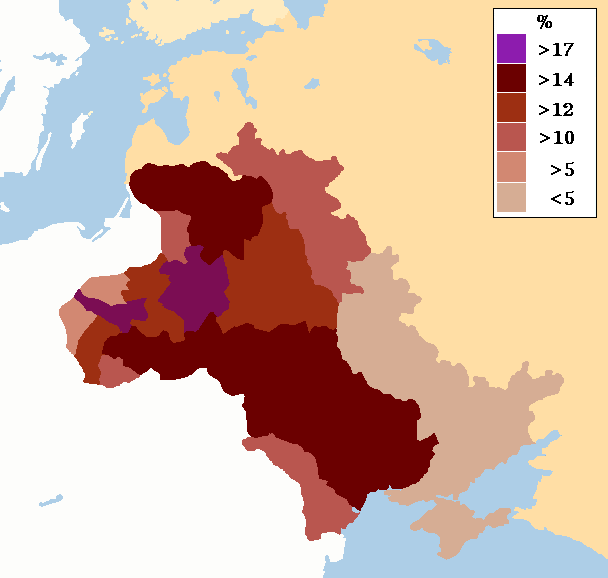
Map showing percentage of Jews in the Pale of Settlement and Congress Poland, c. 1905

A shtetl is defined by Yohanan Petrovsky-Shtern as "an East European market town in private possession of a Polish magnate, inhabited mostly but not exclusively by Jews" and from the 1790s onward and until 1915 shtetls were also "subject to Russian bureaucracy", as the Russian Empire had annexed the entire Lithuania and the eastern part of Poland, and was administering the area where the settlement of Jews was permitted. The concept of shtetl culture describes the traditional way of life of East European Jews. In literature by authors such as Sholem Aleichem and Isaac Bashevis Singer, shtetls are portrayed as pious communities following Orthodox Judaism, socially stable and unchanging despite outside influence or attacks.

== History ==
The history of the oldest Eastern European shtetls began around the 13th century. Throughout this history, shtetls saw periods of relative tolerance and prosperity as well as times of extreme poverty and hardships, including pogroms in the 19th-century Russian Empire. According to Mark Zborowski and Elizabeth Herzog (1962):

The attitudes and thought habits characteristic of the learning tradition are as evident in the street and market place as the yeshiva. The popular picture of the Jew in Eastern Europe, held by Jew and Gentile alike, is true to the Talmudic tradition. The picture includes the tendency to examine, analyze and re-analyze, to seek meanings behind meanings and for implications and secondary consequences. It includes also a dependence on deductive logic as a basis for practical conclusions and actions. In life, as in the Torah, it is assumed that everything has deeper and secondary meanings, which must be probed. All subjects have implications and ramifications. Moreover, the person who makes a statement must have a reason, and this too must be probed. Often a comment will evoke an answer to the assumed reason behind it or to the meaning believed to lie beneath it, or to the remote consequences to which it leads. The process that produces such a response—often with lightning speed—is a modest reproduction of the pilpul process.

The May Laws introduced by Tsar Alexander III of Russia in 1882 banned Jews from rural areas and towns of fewer than ten thousand people. In the 20th century, revolutions, civil wars, industrialisation and the Holocaust destroyed traditional shtetl existence.

The decline of the shtetl started from about the 1840s. Contributing factors included poverty as a result of changes in economic climate (including industrialisation which hurt the traditional Jewish artisan and the movement of trade to the larger towns), repeated fires destroying the wooden homes, and overpopulation. Also, the antisemitism of the Russian Imperial administrators and the Polish landlords, as well as the resultant pogroms in the 1880s, made life difficult for residents of the shtetl. From the 1880s until 1915 up to 2 million Jews left Eastern Europe. At the time about three-quarters of its Jewish population lived in areas defined as shtetls. The Holocaust resulted in the total extermination of these towns. It was not uncommon for the entire Jewish population of a shtetl to be rounded up and murdered in a nearby forest or taken to the various concentration camps. Some shtetl inhabitants were able to emigrate before and after the Holocaust, which resulted in many Ashkenazi Jewish traditions being passed on. However, the shtetl as a community of Ashkenazi Jews in Eastern Europe, as well as much of the culture specific to this way of life, was all but eradicated by the Nazis.

=== Modern usage ===
In the later part of the 20th century, Hasidic Jews founded new communities in the United States, such as Kiryas Joel and New Square, and they sometimes use the term "shtetl" to refer to these enclaves in Yiddish, particularly those with village structures.

In Europe, the Orthodox community in Antwerp, Belgium, is widely described as the last shtetl, composed of about 12,000 people. The Gateshead, United Kingdom Orthodox community is also sometimes called a shtetl.

Brno, Czech Republic, has a significant Jewish history and Yiddish words are part of the now dying-out Hantec slang. The word "štetl" (pronounced shtetl) refers to Brno itself.

Qırmızı Qəsəbə, in Azerbaijan, thought to be the only 100% Jewish community not in Israel or the United States, has been described as a shtetl.

== Culture ==
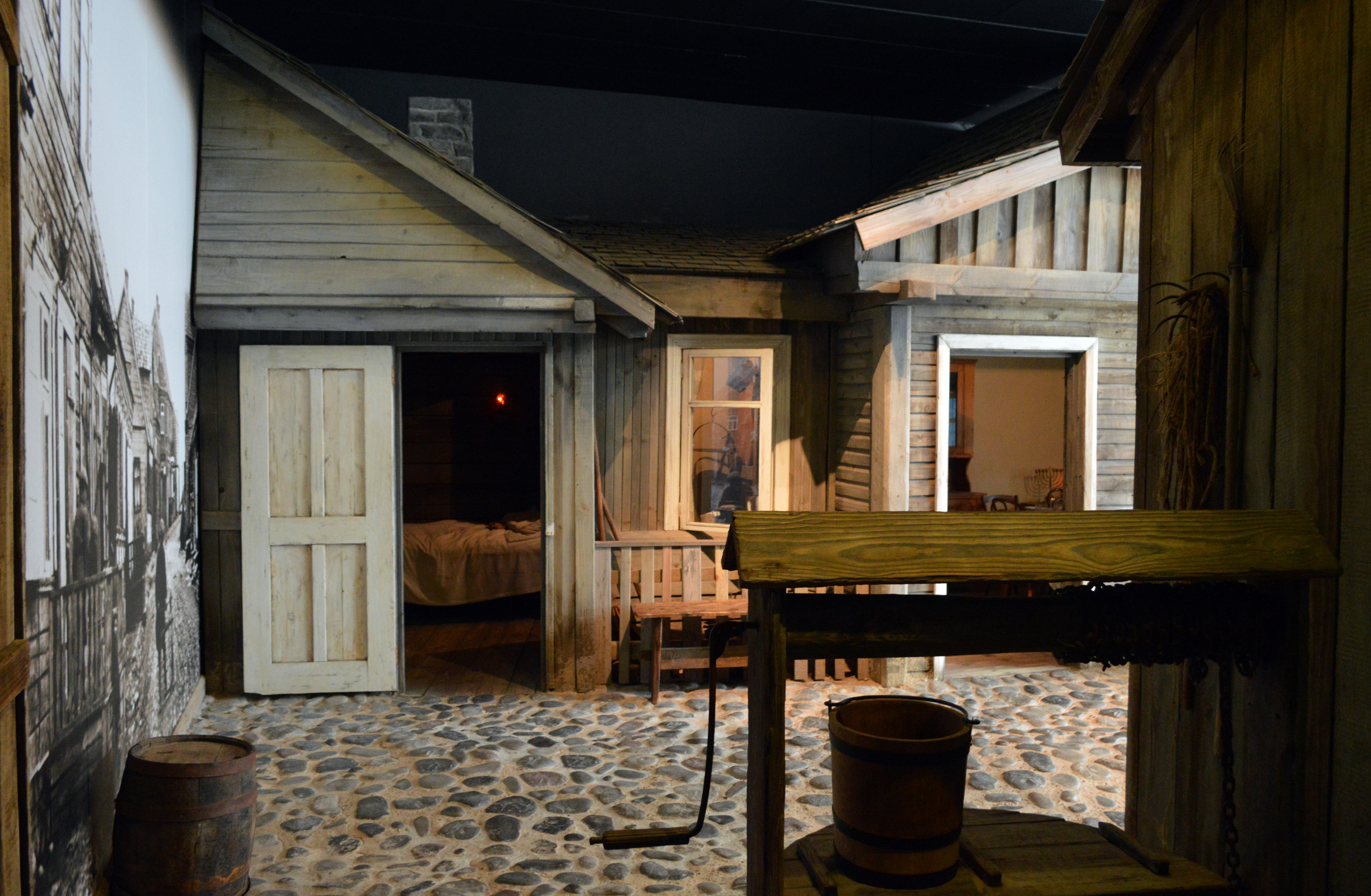
A reconstruction of a traditional Jewish shtetl in the South African Jewish Museum in Cape Town, as it would have appeared in Lithuania

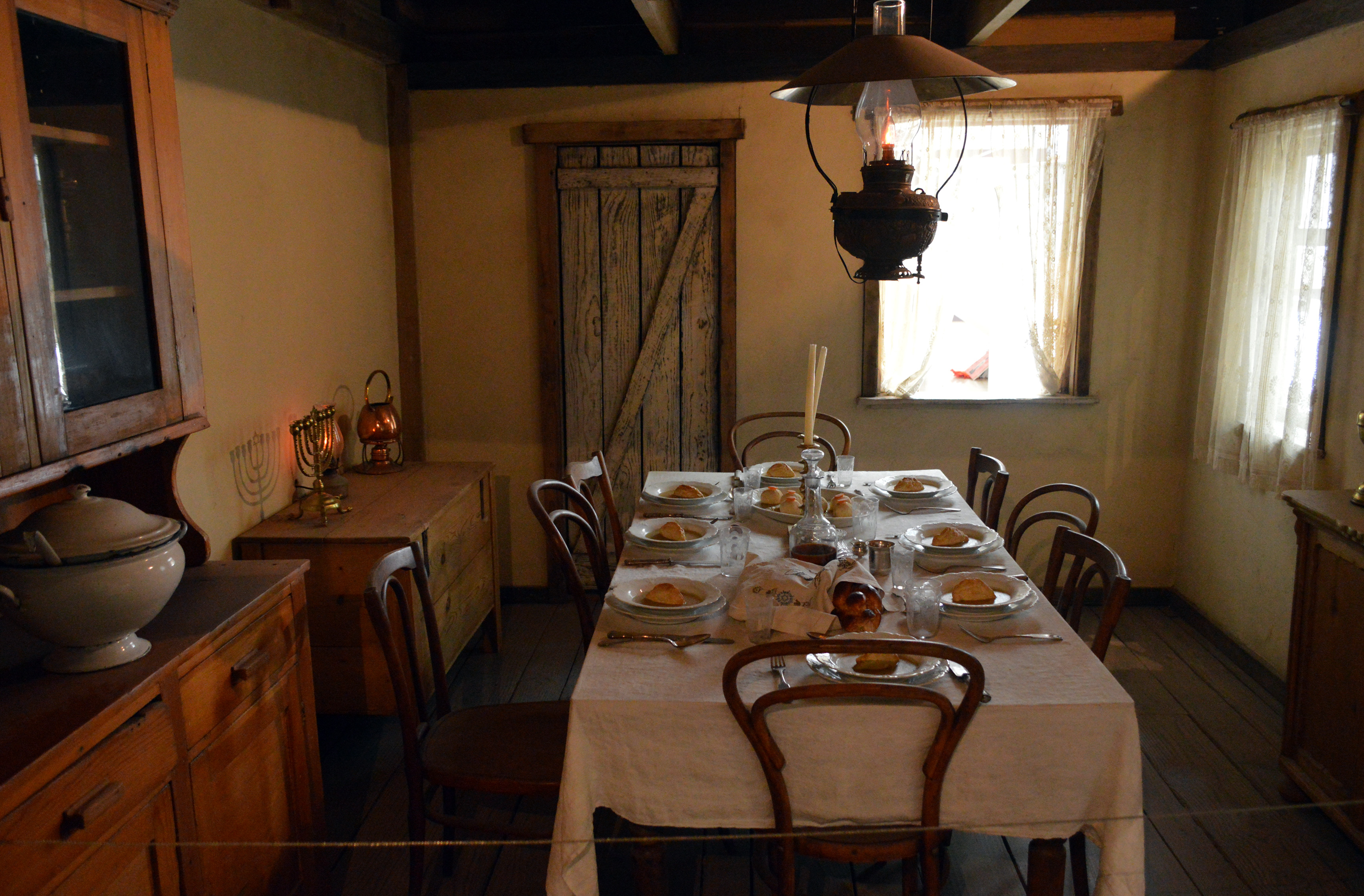
Interior of a wooden dwelling in a traditional Lithuanian shtetl, reconstructed in the South African Jewish Museum, Cape Town

Not only did the Jews of the shtetls speak Yiddish, a language rarely spoken by outsiders, but they also had a unique rhetorical style, rooted in traditions of Talmudic learning:

In keeping with his own conception of contradictory reality, the man of the shtetl is noted both for volubility and for laconic, allusive speech. Both pictures are true, and both are characteristic of the yeshiva as well as the market places. When the scholar converses with his intellectual peers, incomplete sentences, a hint, a gesture, may replace a whole paragraph. The listener is expected to understand the full meaning on the basis of a word or even a sound... Such a conversation, prolonged and animated, may be as incomprehensible to the uninitiated as if the excited discussants were talking in tongues. The same verbal economy may be found in domestic or business circles.

Shtetls provided a strong sense of community. The shtetl "at its heart, it was a community of faith built upon a deeply rooted religious culture". A Jewish education was most paramount in shtetls. Men and boys could spend up to 10 hours a day dedicated to studying at a yeshiva. Discouraged from Talmudic study, women would perform the necessary tasks of a household. In addition, shtetls offered communal institutions such as synagogues, ritual baths and ritual food processors.

Tzedakah (charity) is a key element of Jewish culture, both secular and religious, to this day. Tzedakah was essential for shtetl Jews, many of whom lived in poverty. Acts of philanthropy aided social institutions such as schools and orphanages. Jews viewed giving charity as an opportunity to do a good deed (chesed).

This approach to good deeds finds its roots in Jewish religious views, summarized in Pirkei Avot by Shimon Hatzaddik's "three pillars":

On three things the world stands. On Torah, On service [of God], And on acts of human kindness.

Material things were neither disdained nor extremely praised in the shtetl. Learning and education were the ultimate measures of worth in the eyes of the community, while money was secondary to status. As the shtetl formed an entire town and community, residents worked diverse jobs such as shoe-making, metallurgy, or tailoring of clothes. Studying was considered the most valuable and hardest work of all. Learned yeshiva men who did not provide bread and relied on their wives for money were not frowned upon but praised.

There is a belief found in historical and literary writings that the shtetl disintegrated before it was destroyed during World War II; however, Joshua Rothenberg of the Institute of East-European Jewish Affairs at Brandeis University argued that this alleged cultural break-up is never clearly defined. He argued that the whole Jewish life in Eastern Europe, not only in shtetls, "was in a state of permanent crisis, both political and economic, of social uncertainty and cultural conflicts". Rothenberg outlines a number of reasons for the image of "disintegrating shtetl'" and other kinds of stereotyping. For one, it was an "anti-shtetl" propaganda of the Zionist movement. Yiddish and Hebrew literature can only to a degree be considered to represent the complete reality. It mostly focused on the elements that attract attention, rather than on an "average Jew". Also, in successful America, memories of shtetl, in addition to sufferings, were colored with nostalgia and sentimentalism.

== Artistic depictions ==
=== Literary references ===
The city of Chełm, in what is today southeastern Poland, figures prominently in the Jewish humor as the legendary town of fools: the Wise Men of Chelm.

Kasrilevka, the setting of many of Sholem Aleichem's stories, and Anatevka, the setting of the musical Fiddler on the Roof (based on other stories of Sholem Aleichem), are other notable fictional shtetls.

Devorah Baron made aliyah to Ottoman Palestine in 1910, after a pogrom destroyed her shtetl near Minsk. But she continued writing about shtetl life long after she had arrived in Palestine.

Many of Joseph Roth's books are based on shtetls on the Eastern fringes of the Austro-Hungarian Empire and most notably on his hometown Brody.

Many of Isaac Bashevis Singer's short stories and novels are set in shtetls. Singer's mother was the daughter of the rabbi of Biłgoraj, a town in south-eastern Poland. As a child, Singer lived in Biłgoraj for periods with his family, and he wrote that life in the small town made a deep impression on him.

The 2002 novel Everything Is Illuminated, by Jonathan Safran Foer, tells a fictional story set in the Ukrainian shtetl Trachimbrod (Trochenbrod).

The 1992 children's book Something from Nothing, written and illustrated by Phoebe Gilman, is an adaptation of a traditional Jewish folk tale set in a fictional shtetl.

In 1996 the Frontline programme "Shtetl" broadcast; it was about Polish Christian and Jewish relations.

Harry Turtledove's 2011 short story "Shtetl Days", begins in a typical shtetl reminiscent of the works of Aleichem, Roth, et al., but soon reveals a plot twist which subverts the genre.

The award-winning 2014 novel The Books of Jacob by Olga Tokarczuk features many shtetl communities across the Polish–Lithuanian Commonwealth.

=== Painting ===
Many Jewish artists in Eastern Europe dedicated much of their artistic careers to depictions of the shtetl. These include Marc Chagall, Chaim Goldberg, Chaïm Soutine and Mané-Katz. Their contribution is in making a permanent record in color of the life that is described in literature—the klezmers, the weddings, the marketplaces and the religious aspects of the culture.

=== Photography ===
- Alter Kacyzne (1885–1941), Jewish writer (Yiddish-language prose and poetry) and photographer; immortalized Jewish life in Poland in the 1920s and 1930s.
- Roman Vishniac (1897–1990), Russian-, later American-Jewish biologist and photographer; photographed traditional Jewish life in Eastern Europe in 1935–39.

=== Film ===
- The Dybbuk, 1937
- The Fixer, 1968
- Fiddler on the Roof, 1971
- Yentl, 1983
- Train of Life, 1998
- The Golem, 2018
- An American Pickle, 2020
- Shttl, 2023 – a Yiddish–Ukrainian drama depicting the lives of a shtetl on the eve of Operation Barbarossa. A shtetl was built outside of Kyiv specifically for the film, and was set to become a historical museum before the Russian invasion interrupted those plans.

==== Documentaries ====
- Shtetl, 1996
- Return to My Shtetl Delatyn, 1992

== See also ==
- Qırmızı Qəsəbə – the world's last surviving historical shtetl
- History of the Jews in Ukraine
- History of the Jews in Bessarabia
- History of the Jews in Carpathian Ruthenia
- History of the Jews in Poland
- History of the Jews in Russia
- Jewish diaspora
- List of Hasidic dynasties and groups
- List of shtetls and shtots
- List of villages and towns depopulated of Jews during the Holocaust
- Charles Thau
