= Olga Antonovna Liaskovskaia =

Soviet art historian (1892–1988)

- Born: 24 February 1892; Grodno, Russian Empire
- Died: 1988 (aged 95–96); Moscow, Soviet Union
- Occupations: Author, art historian
- Awards: Order of the Red Banner of Labour

Olga Antonovna Liaskovskaia (Russian: Ольга Антоновна Лясковская; 24 February 1892 – July 1988) was a Soviet art historian. She is known for authoring one of the first monographs in the USSR devoted to French Gothic art, published in 1973.

== Early life and education ==
Olga Antonovna Liaskovskaia was born on 24 February 1892 to Anton-Franz Lyaskovsky (1852–1912). Her mother was Olga Alekseyevna Liaskovskaia (née Margaritina; 1867–1940).

== Career ==
From 1924 to 1962, she worked as a research fellow at the State Tretyakov Gallery. During World War II, from 1942 to 1944, she was evacuated to Novosibirsk, where she defended her thesis.

Liaskovskaia authored a number of scholarly works on Russian artists, including studies of Karl Bryullov (1940), Vasily Polenov (1946), Pavel Chistyakov (1950) and Ilya Repin (1953).

She retired in 1962, but continued her scholarly work, focusing on |illustrated monographs and contributing to the third edition of a volume on Ilya Repin, published in 1982, the year of her 90th birthday. This edition later received a gold medal at the International Book Art Exhibition in Leipzig in 1989.

She died in July 1988.

== Awards ==
Order of the Red Banner of Labour (11 May 1956), awarded for contributions to the promotion of Russian and Soviet fine art and in connection with the centenary of the State Tretyakov Gallery.

== Selected bibliography ==
- Zhenschina v russkoi zhivopisi (1925)
- V. G. Perov (1833–1882) (1931)
- Karl Bryullov (1940)
- V. D. Polenov (1844–1927) (1946)
- P. P. Chistyakov (1950)
- Ilya Efimovich Repin (1953)
- Plein air v russkoi zhivopisi XIX veka (1966)
- French Gothic: Architecture, Sculpture, Stained Glass (1973)
- V. G. Perov: Features of the Artist's Creative Path (1979)
