= Viktor Bobrov =

Viktor Bobrov may refer to:

- Viktor Bobrov (painter) (1842–1918), Russian painter
- Viktor Bobrov (ice hockey) (born 1984), Russian hockey player
