= Pavel Chistyakov =

Russian painter (1832–1919)

- Павел Чистяков
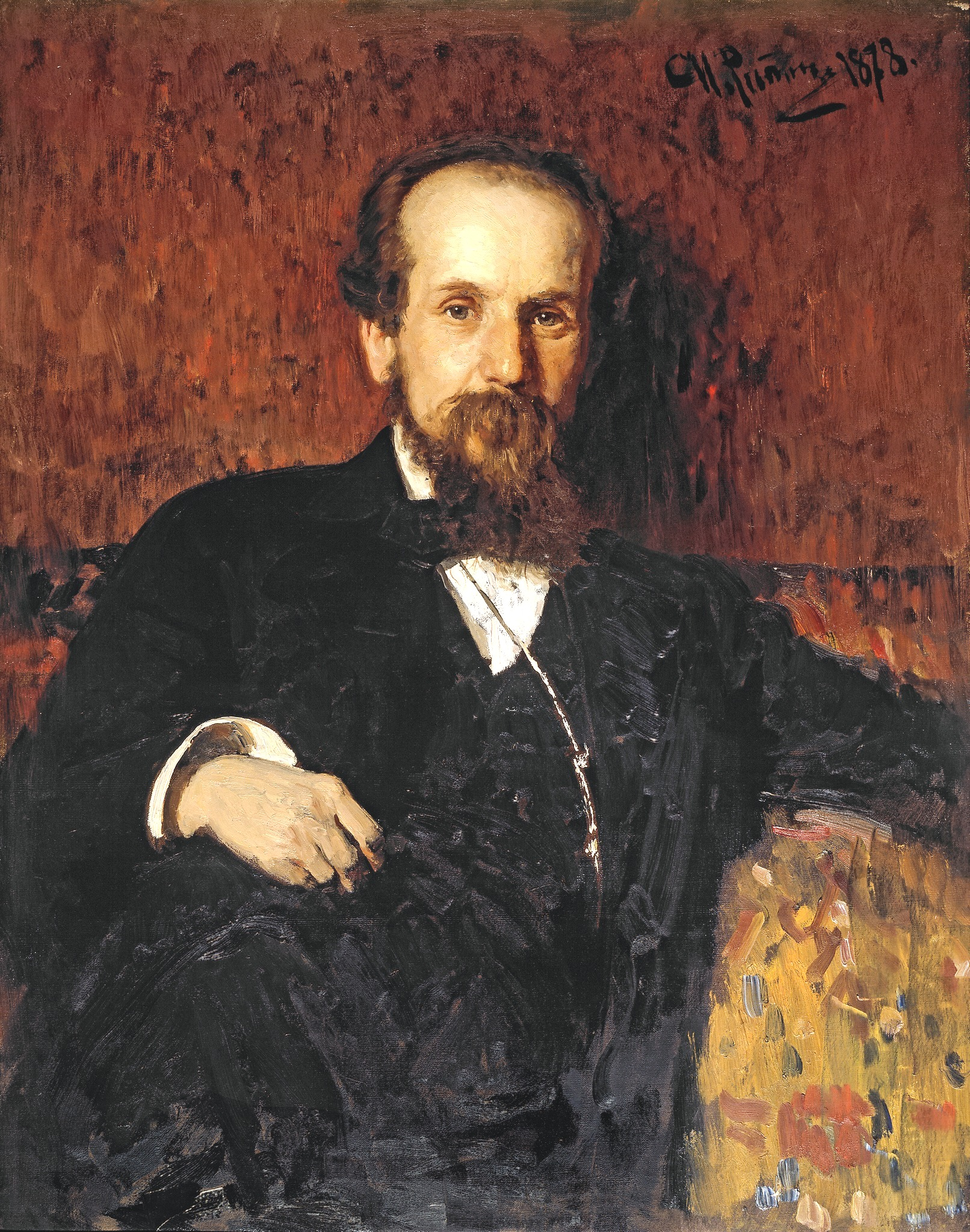
- Portrait by Ilya Repin, 1878, oils; Tretyakov Gallery, Moscow
- Born: July 5, 1832; Vesyegonsky Uyezd, Tver Governorate, Russian Empire
- Died: November 11, 1919 (aged 87); Detskoye Selo, RSFSR
- Resting place: Kazan Cemetery, Pushkin, St. Petersburg
- Education: Pyotr Basin
- Alma mater: Imperial Academy of Arts (1861)
- Known for: Painting
- Spouse: Vera Meyer (m. 1871)
- Children: three
- Awards: Big Gold Medal of the Imperial Academy of Arts (1861)
- Elected: Member Academy of Arts (1870); Professor by rank (1892); Full Member Academy of Arts (1893)

Pavel Petrovich Chistyakov (Russian: Па́вел Петро́вич Чистяко́в; 5 July 1832 — 11 November 1919) was a Russian painter and art teacher, active in St. Petersburg (later Petrograd) and Tsarskoye Selo from Tsar Alexander II's reign through the Civil War days. He is known for historical and genre scenes as well as portraits.

== Biography ==
Chistyakov Museum in Pushkin

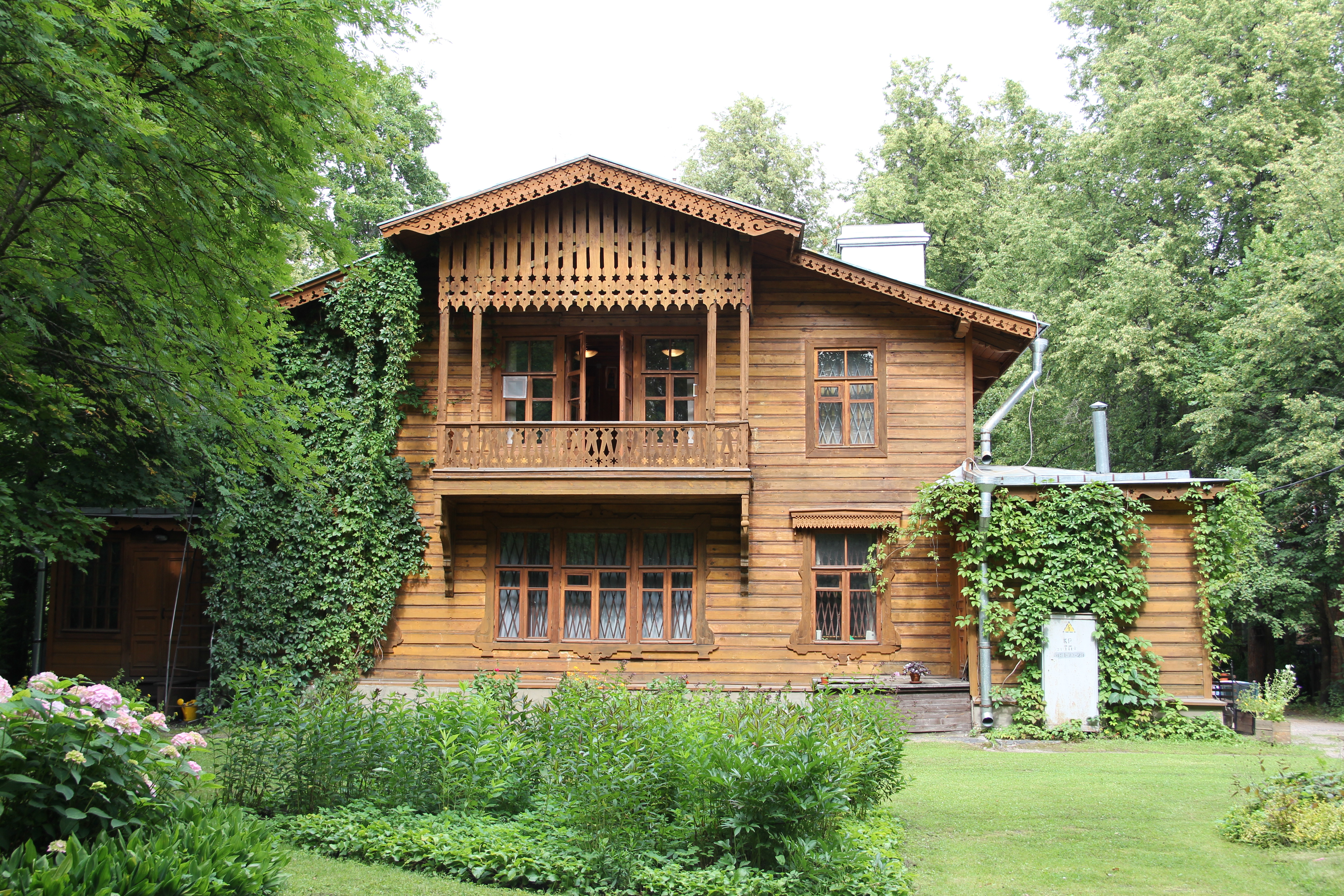
The Museum

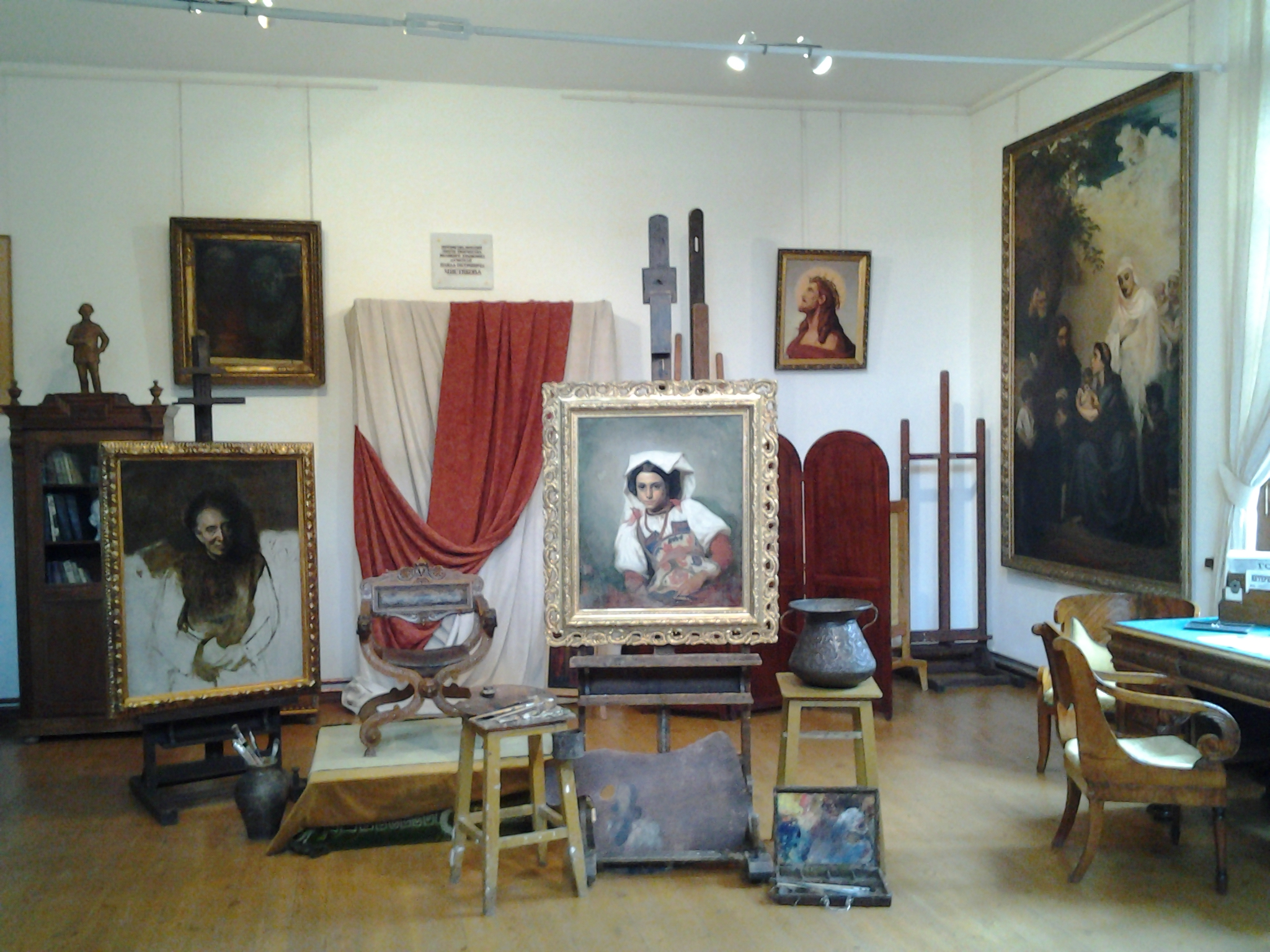

His father was a freed serf who had worked as an estate manager. Despite the financial burdens, he saw to it that his son had a proper education; first at a parish school in Krasny Kholm, then the secondary school in Bezhetsk.

In 1849, he entered the Imperial Academy of Arts, where he studied with Pyotr Basin and Maxim Vorobiev. From 1854 to 1858, he received two silver medals and one gold, for his depiction of Hermogenes in prison. In 1861, he graduated with the title of "Artist", another gold medal (for his painting of Sophia of Lithuania at the wedding of her son, Vasily II) and the right to a stipend for study abroad. Before leaving, he taught for a short time at a preparatory school in Saint Petersburg.

In 1862, he headed for Germany, followed by lengthy visits to Paris and Rome. Upon returning in 1870, he was awarded the title of "Academician" for several works he had sent home.

After this time, he devoted himself primarily to teaching, first at the Imperial Society for the Encouragement of the Arts, then the academy, where he developed his own teaching methods which merged direct observation with scientific study. He rarely exhibited. His few works were mostly of an historical nature, which he attempted to infuse with a psychological depth, rather than merely representing the events.

He became an associate professor at the academy in 1872 and, following the reorganization of 1892, became a member of the academic council. From 1890 to 1912, he served as head of the Department of Mosaics and oversaw several mosaic projects; notably at the Cathedral of Christ the Saviour and Saint Isaac's Cathedral.

His wife Vera, daughter of the landscape painter Yegor Meyer, was also an artist of some note. The street where he lived was named in his honor and, in 1987, his home in Pushkin (a suburb of Saint Petersburg) became a museum.

== Notable pupils ==
- Isaak Asknaziy
- Varvara Baruzdina
- Victor Borisov-Musatov
- Fyodor Buchholz
- Dmitry Kardovsky
- Kosta Khetagurov
- Nikolai Kuznetsov
- Yehuda Pen
- Vasily Polenov
- Yelena Polenova
- Ilya Repin
- Andrei Ryabushkin
- Nikolai Samokish
- Ivan Seleznyov
- Valentin Serov
- Dmitry Shcherbinovsky
- Vasily Smirnov
- Kazimierz Stabrowski
- Vasily Surikov
- Mykhailo Stepanovych Tkachenko
- Viktor Vasnetsov
- Mikhail Vrubel

== Selected paintings ==
Pavel Chistyakov's paintings

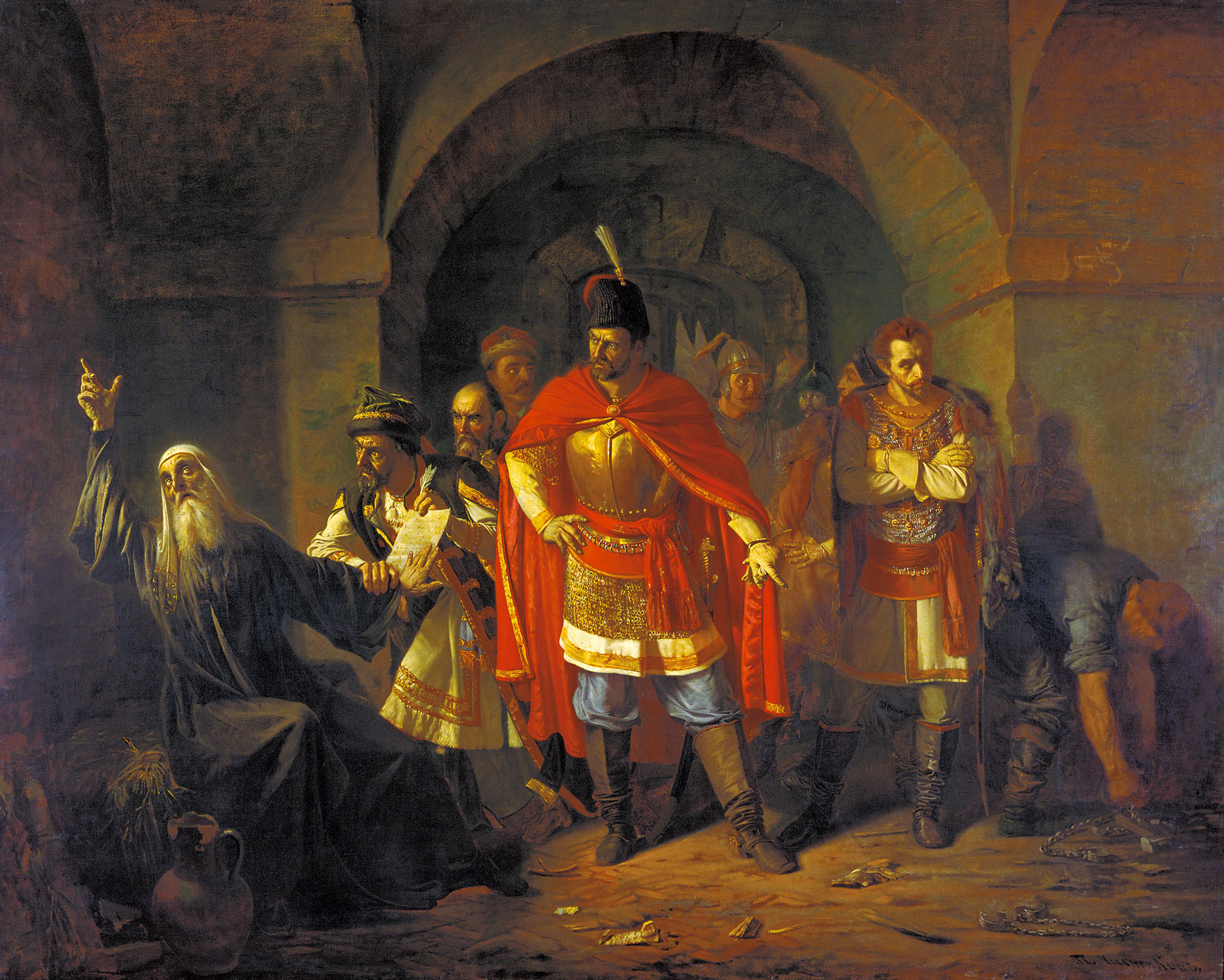
Patriarch Hermogenes of Moscow, Refusing to Bless the Poles (1860)

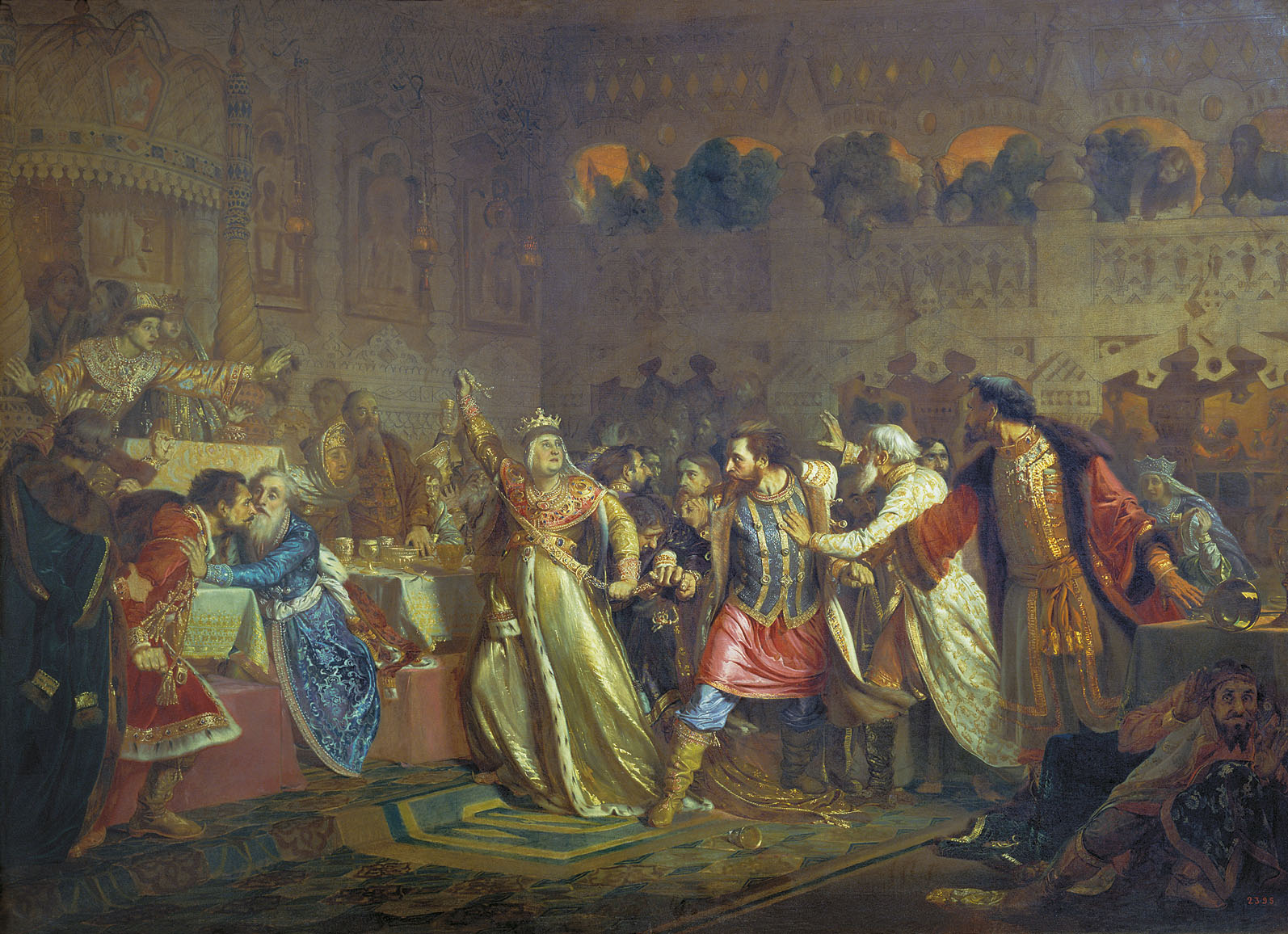
Sophia of Lithuania Snatching the Gold Belt from Vasily Kosoy (1861)

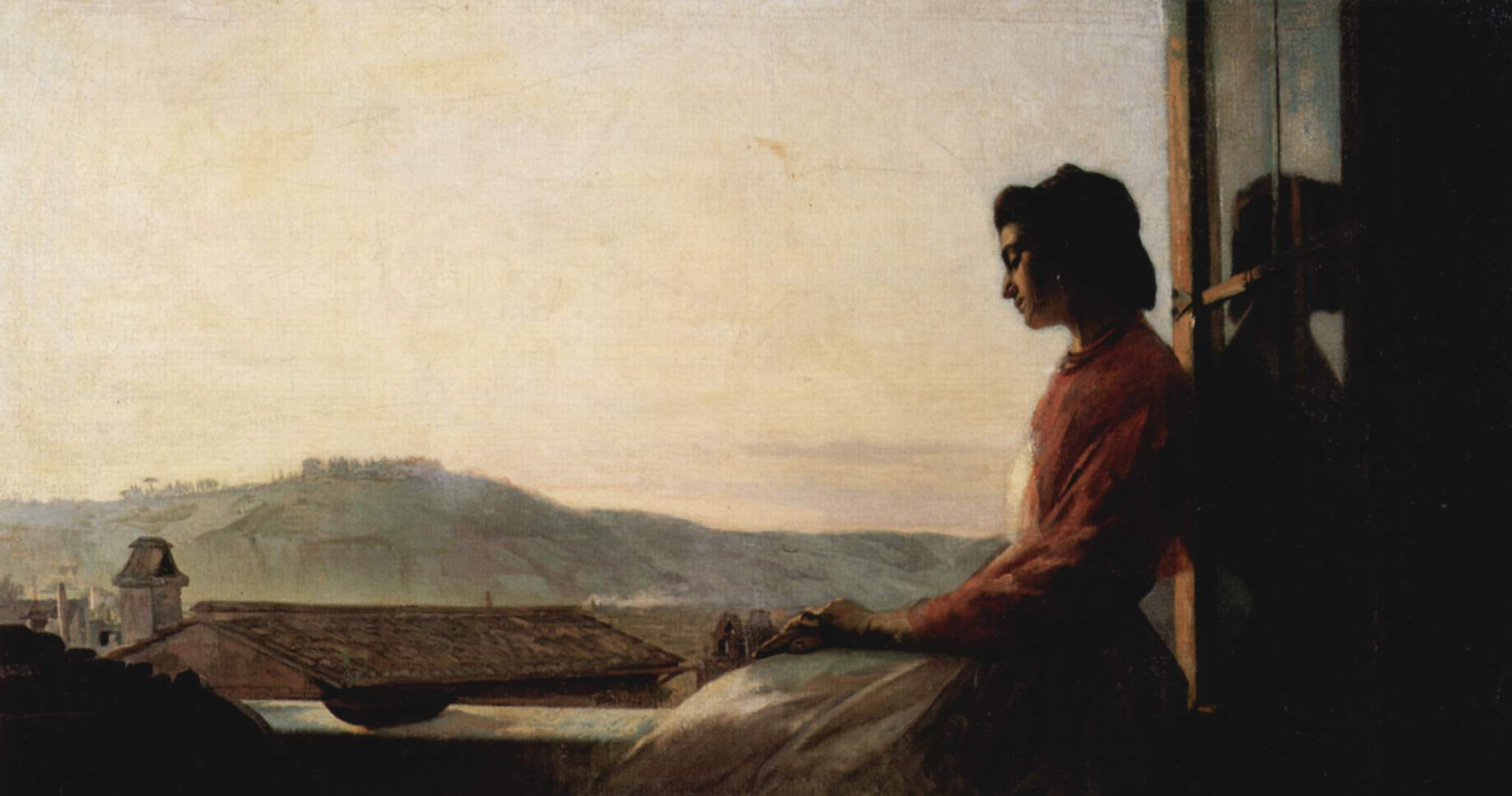
Giovannina is sitting on the windowsill (1864)

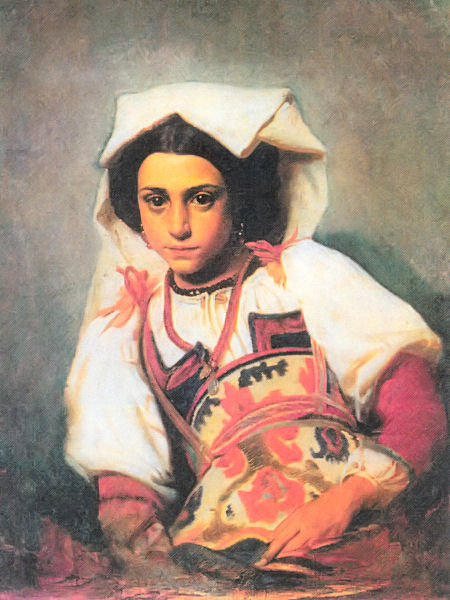
Giovannina

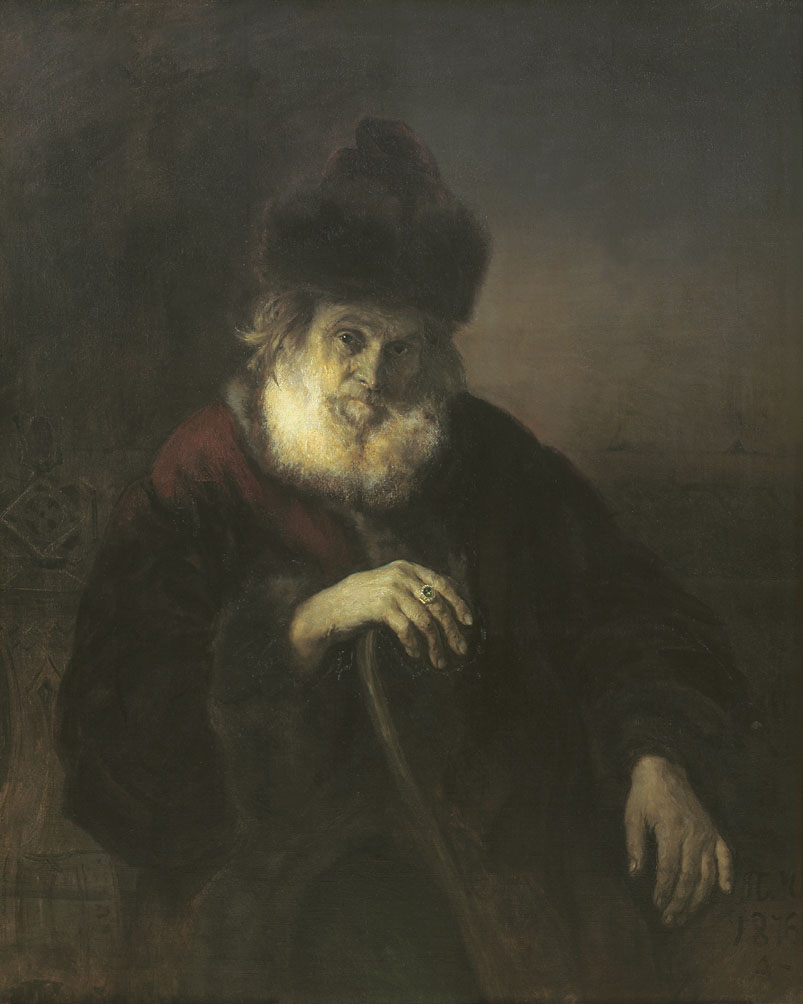
Boyarin (1876)

== Publications ==
- Chistyakov, Pavel P.; et al. (1953). Belyutin, Eliy M. and Moleva, Nina M. [in Russian] (eds.). П. П. Чистяков, 1832—1919. Письма, записные книжки, воспоминания (in Russian). Moscow: Iskusstvo. OCLC 8319912.
