= Vasily Sergeyevich Smirnov (painter) =

Russian painter (1858–1890)

- Василий Сергеевич Смирнов
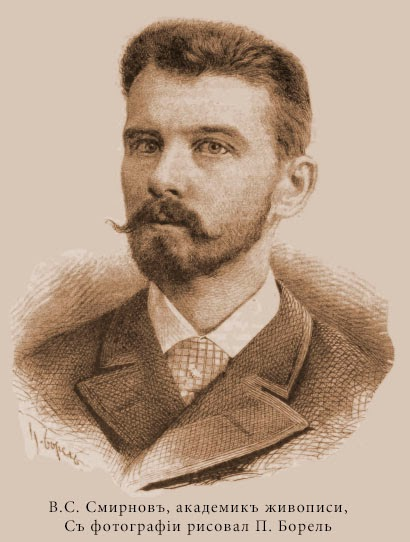
- Portrait of Vasily Smirnov, by Pyotr Borel
- Born: September 12, 1858; Moscow, Russian Empire
- Died: December 17, 1890 (aged 32) near Golitsyno, Russian Empire
- Resting place: Novospassky Monastery, Moscow
- Education: Moscow School of Painting, Sculpture and Architecture; Imperial Academy of Arts (1883)
- Known for: History painting
- Style: Academicism
- Awards: Big Gold Medal of the Imperial Academy of Arts (1883)
- Elected: Member Academy of Arts (1888)

Vasily Sergeyevich Smirnov (Russian: Василий Сергеевич Смирнов; 12 August 1858 – 17 December 1890) was a Russian painter in the Academic style who specialized in scenes from ancient history.

== Biography ==
He was born into a family of Russian nobility. His father served as a chamberlain at the Imperial Court and Marshal of the Nobility in the Klinsky District. He apparently decided upon art as a career through the influence of Vasily Perov, a friend of the family. In 1875, he enrolled at the Moscow School of Painting, Sculpture and Architecture. He participated in an exhibition there in 1878, winning a silver medal.

That same year, he transferred to the Imperial Academy of Arts in Saint Petersburg, where he studied with Pyotr Shamshin and Pavel Chistyakov. In 1882, he was granted leave from the academy due to "chronic catarrh" of the lungs. The following year, he was awarded the title of "artist" and a stipend to study abroad.

He went to Italy, via Vienna, and eventually settled in Rome. The summer heat proved too intense, so he moved to Turin, then spent some time in Paris, exhibiting at the Salon. After traveling throughout Northwestern Europe, he returned to Italy, where he lived with Vasily Savinsky, who became a sort of mentor.

In 1885, he made sketches at Pompeii, which was the start of his interest in classical subjects. The following year, he began work on "The Death of Nero", which took two years to complete. It was sent to Saint Petersburg and, after several showings, was bought by Tsar Alexander III.

In 1889, he became an associate professor at the Academy, but stayed for only a short time as his lung condition (diagnosed as tuberculosis) continued to worsen. The Italian climate had no beneficial effect, so, sensing the end was near, he decided to return to the family estate. He died while in transit, on the train between Kubinka and Golitsyno. His brother organized a major exhibition in 1891, which included several unfinished paintings.

== See also ==
- List of Orientalist artists
- Orientalism

== Works ==
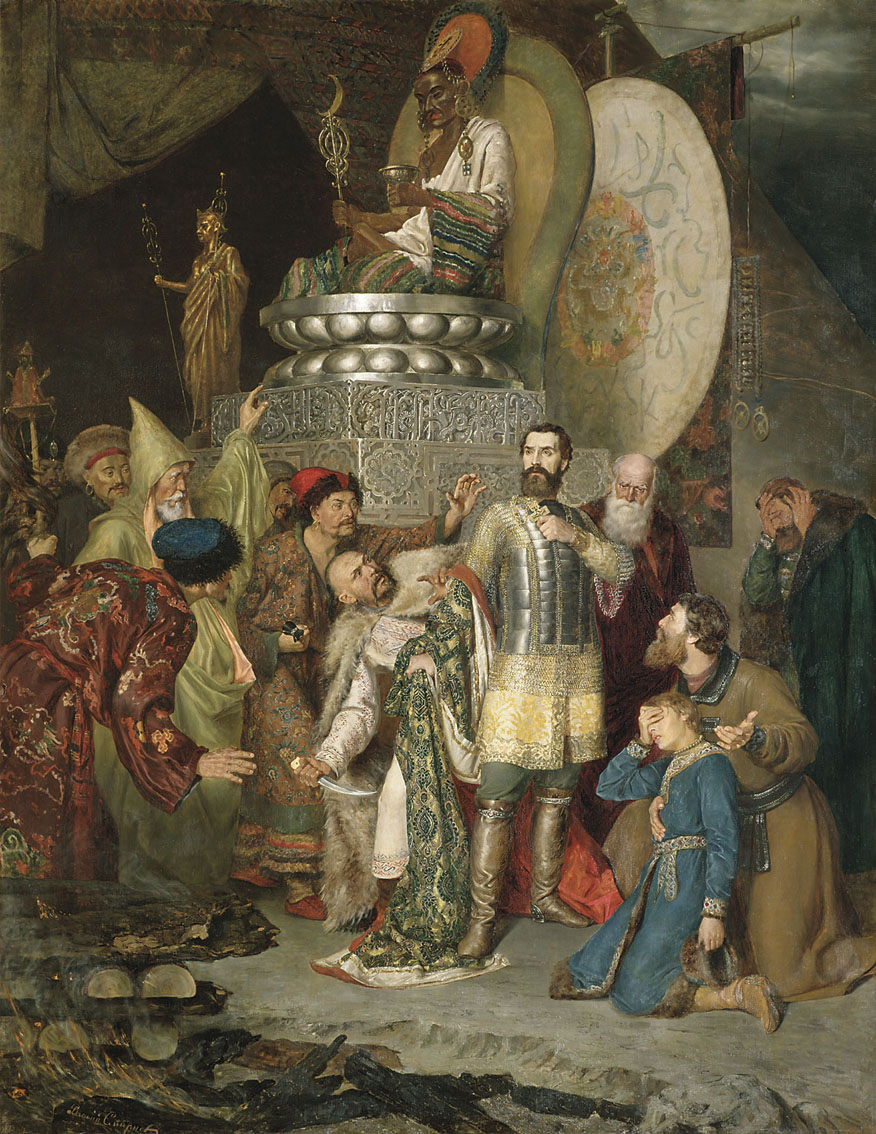
Michael of Chernigov (1883)

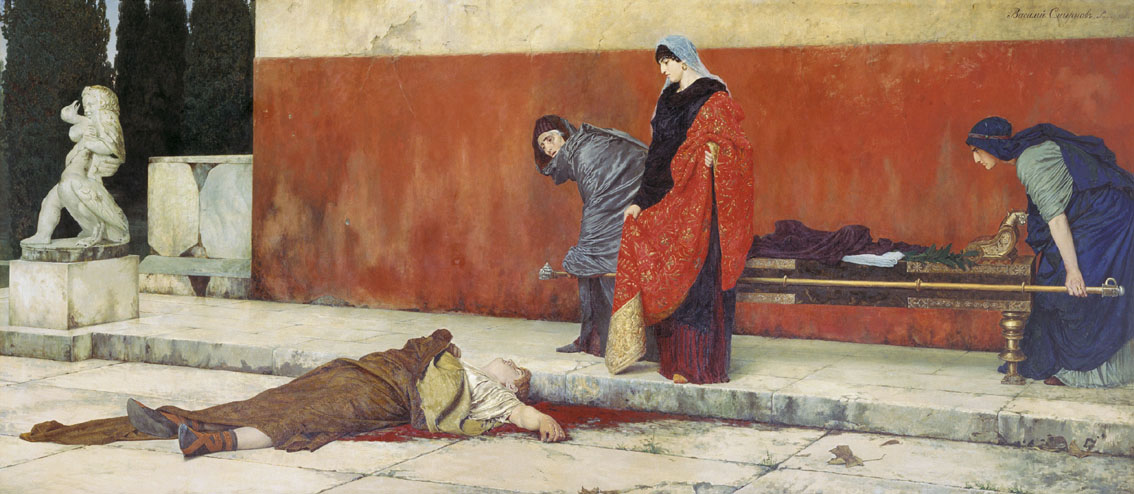
The Death of Nero (1888)

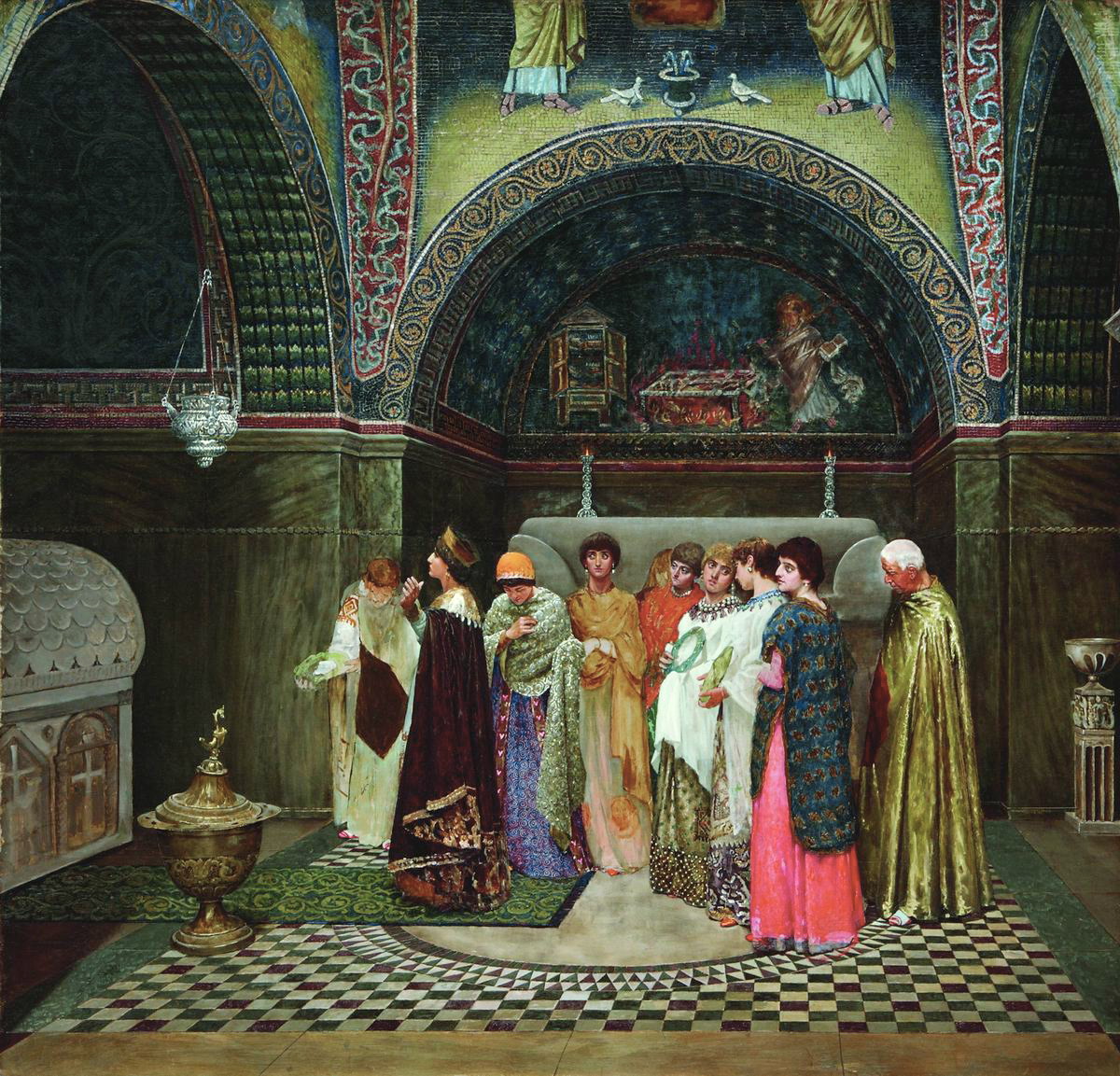
Morning entrance of Byzantine empress to the tomb of her ancestors (1890)

== Literary sources ==
- С. Н. Кондаков (1915). Юбилейный справочник Императорской Академии художеств. 1764-1914 (in Russian). Vol. 2. p. 183.
