= Varvara Baruzdina =

Russian artist (1862–1941)

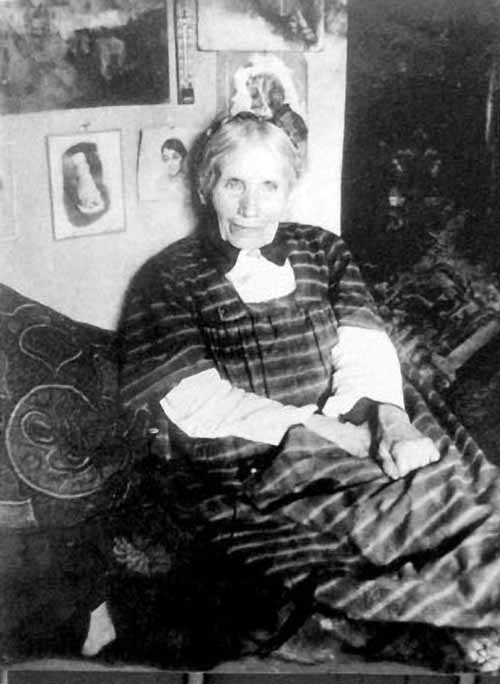
- Varvara Baruzdina (1930s)
- Born: 1862; Krasny Kholm, Tver Governorate, Russian Empire
- Died: 1941; Pushkin near Leningrad, Soviet Union
- Education: Pavel Chistyakov
- Known for: Painting

Varvara Matveevna Baruzdina (Russian: Варвара Матвеевна Баруздина; 1862, Krasny Kholm – 1941, Saint Petersburg) was a Russian painter during the Belle Époque, active in St. Petersburg (later Leningrad) and Tsarskoye Selo. The niece and close student to fellow painter Pavel Chistyakov, she was primarily known for portraits and genre pictures.

== Biography ==
Her father was a village craftsman. In 1875, she moved to Saint Petersburg to live with her uncle, the painter Pavel Chistyakov, who provided her first drawing lessons. Five years later, she entered the Imperial Academy of Arts where she became his formal student. While there, she was awarded a silver medal and graduated in 1885.

She began participating in exhibitions after 1888; notably those of the Academy (until 1916), the Female Art Circle (1889) and the Moscow Art Lovers Society (1895-1896). Her painting, The Nun, was acquired by Pavel Tretyakov in 1896. Another painting, Separated, was shown at the Louisiana Purchase Exposition in 1904. Along with numerous other Russian paintings, it was "lost" there and not recovered for many years.

In the 1920s, after spending some time in Crimea, she moved into Chistyakov's house in the Pushkin District, where she wrote memoirs of his life and attracted a circle of students who wanted to be taught by his methods.

She died in Pushkin during the German invasion and siege of Leningrad, aged nearly eighty; friends buried her in the garden of the Chistyakovs' house. The memoirs were published in 1953.

The majority of Baruzdina's works is owned by the Museum of the Academy of Arts, and is housed in the Chistyakov Museum in Pushkin; that aside, there is only a small number of painting and drawings available, with The Nun of 1893, in the Tretyakov Gallery, The Gradma of 1890, in the Russian Museum from 1925, and Maximilian Voloshin of 1916, in the Literature Museum, Moscow, being the most notable. An oil portrait of Baruzdina, by Vasily Savinsky, signed and dated 1935, is in the Tretyakov Gallery.

== Gallery ==
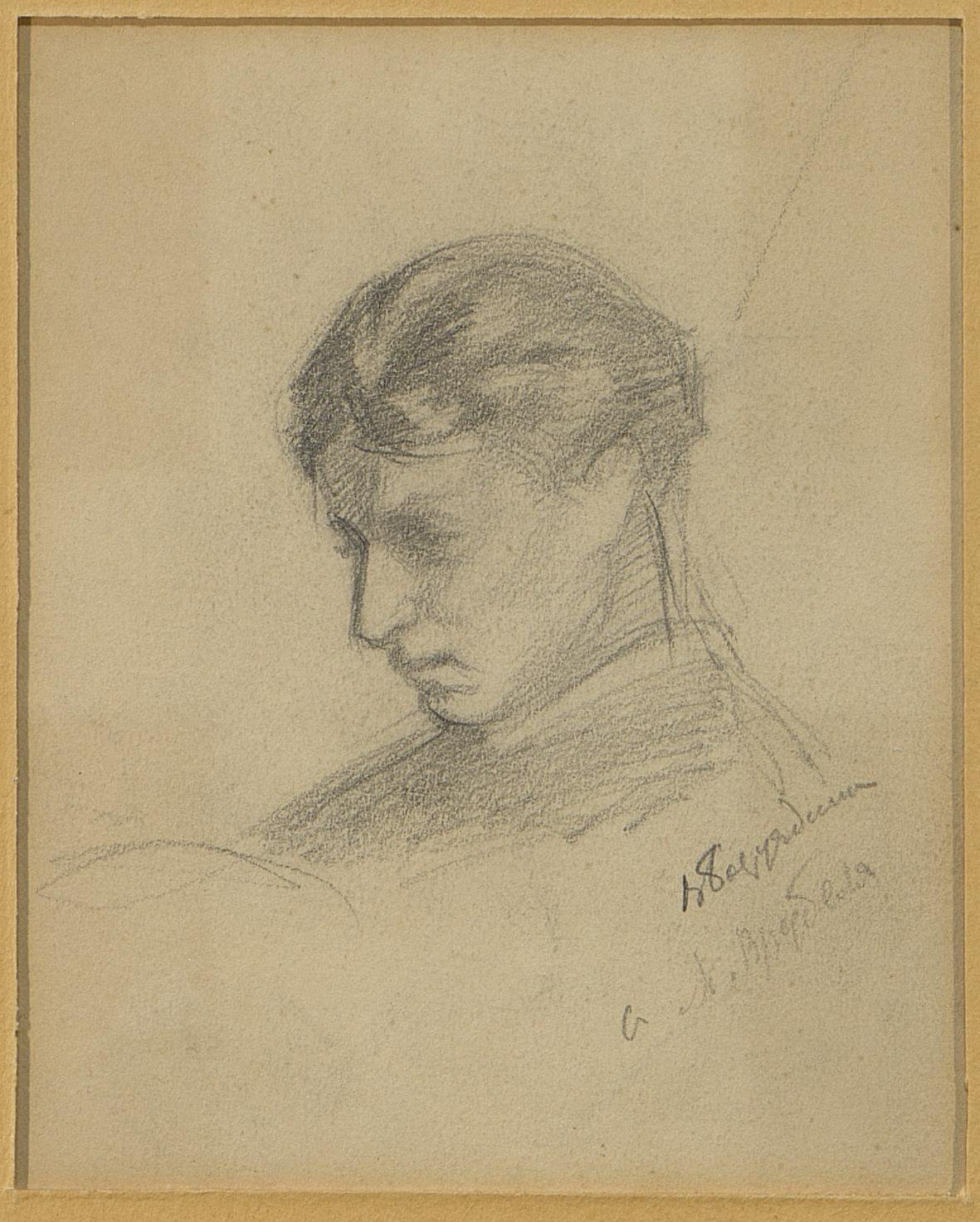
Mikhail Vrubel, c. 1882–1884, graphite; Chistyakov House Museum, Pushkin, St. Petersburg

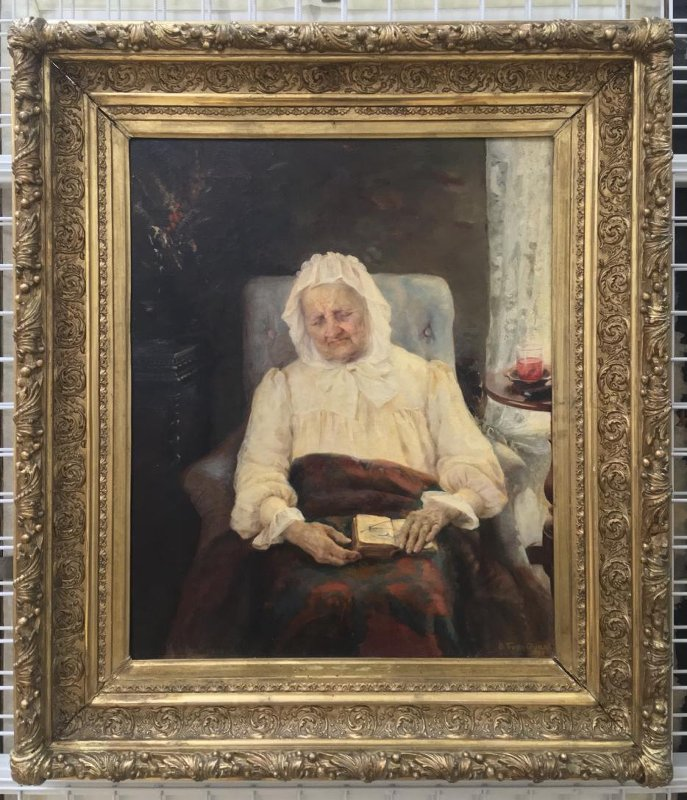
The Grandma, 1890, oils; Russian Museum, on display in the Chistyakov House Museum

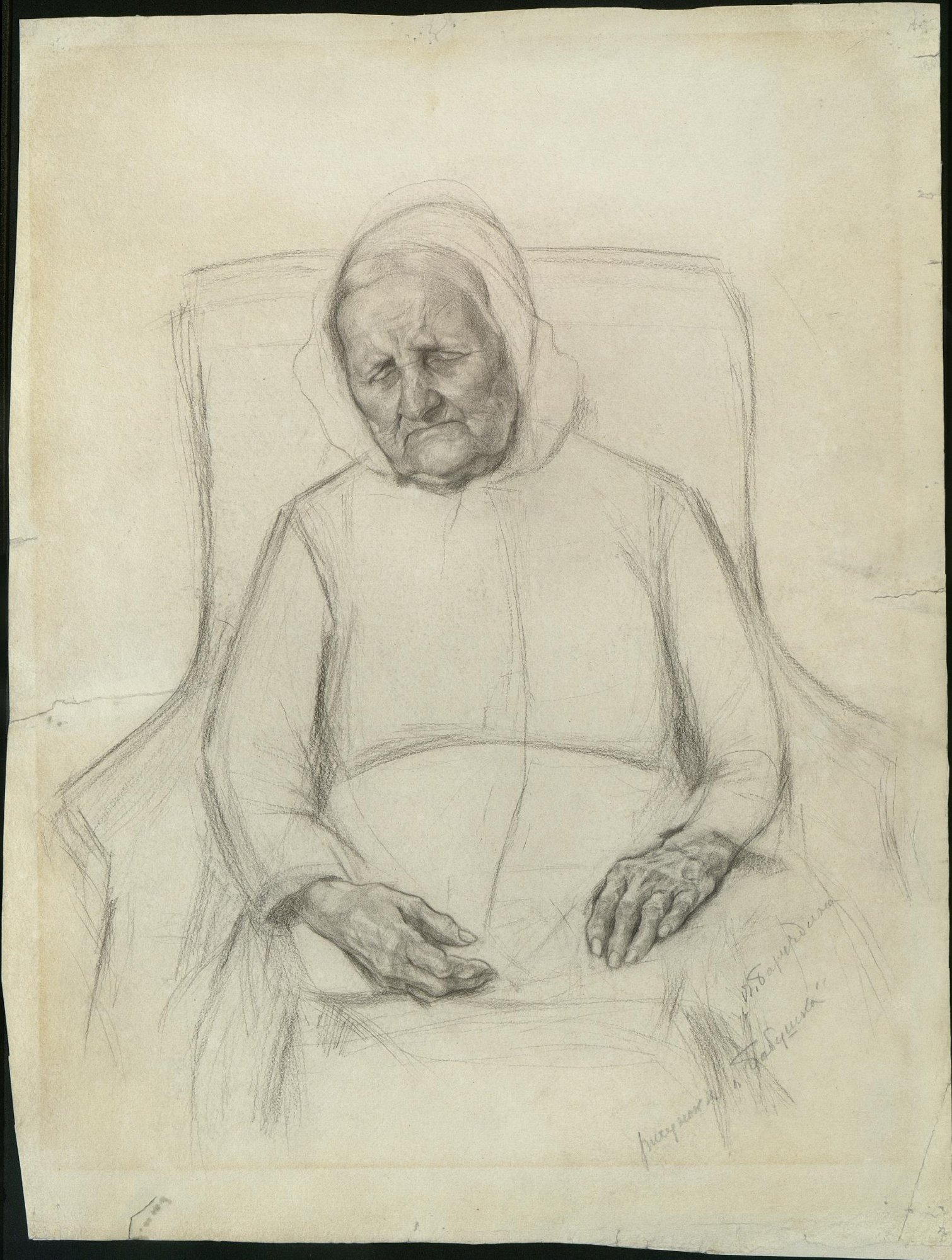
The Grandma, c. 1890, black chalk, preparatory study of the prior work; Chistyakov House Museum

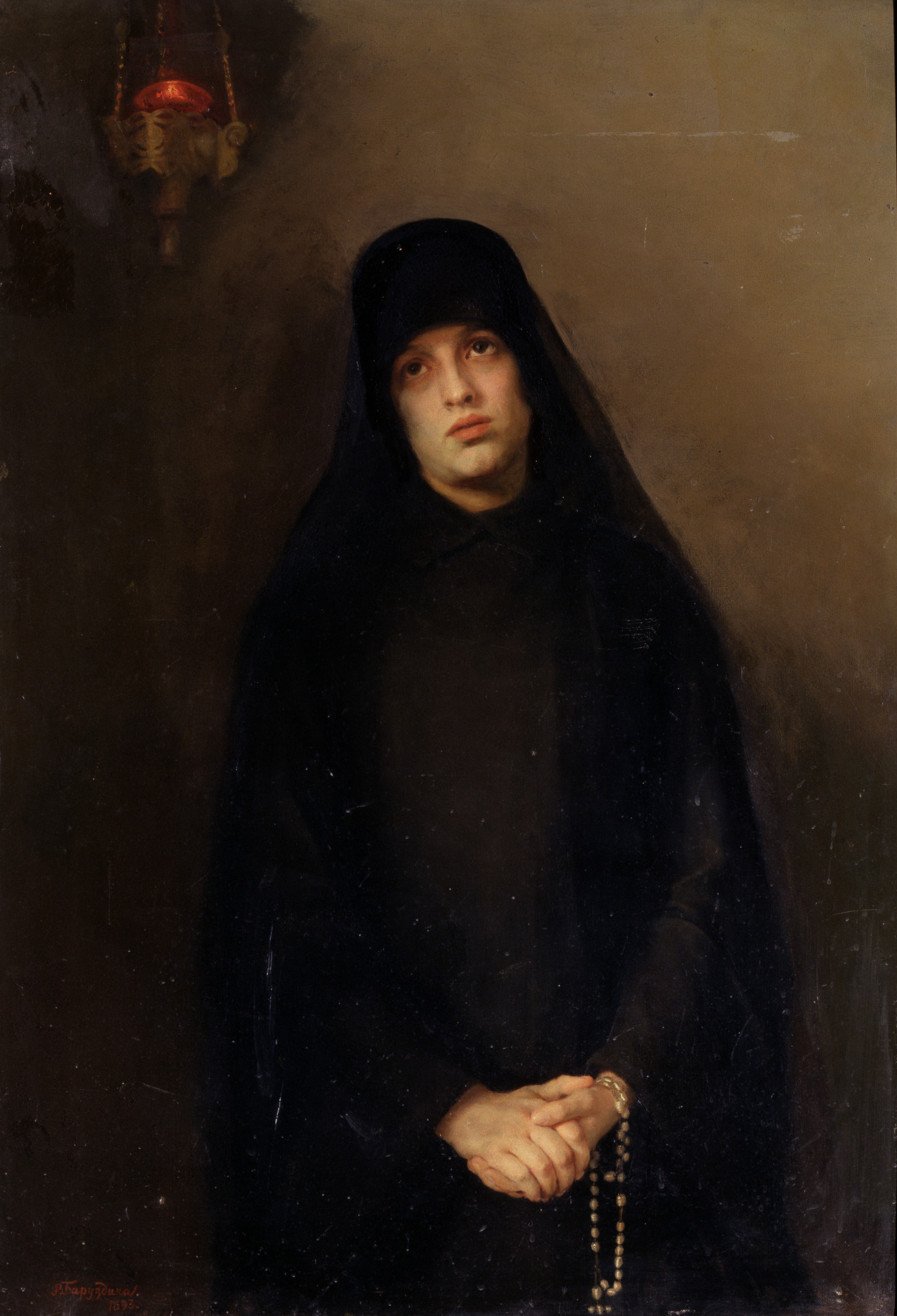
The Nun, 1890, oils; Baruzdina's sole work in the Tretyakov Gallery, acquired by Pavel Tretyakov in 1896

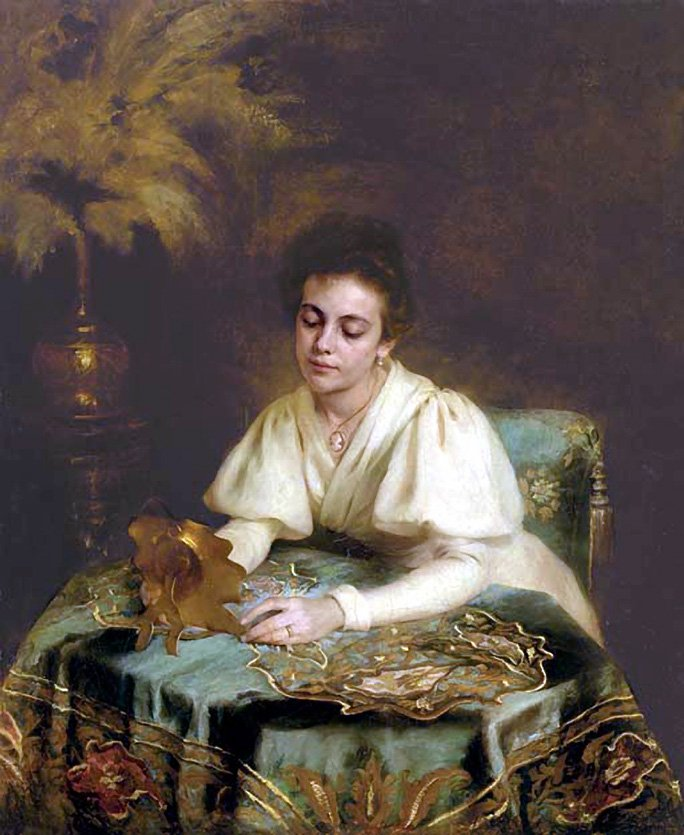
Separated, 1897, oils; private collection

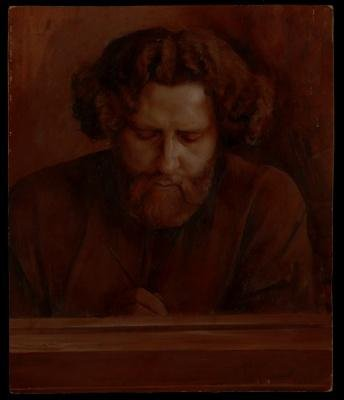
Maximilian Voloshin, 1916, grisaille; Literature Museum, Moscow

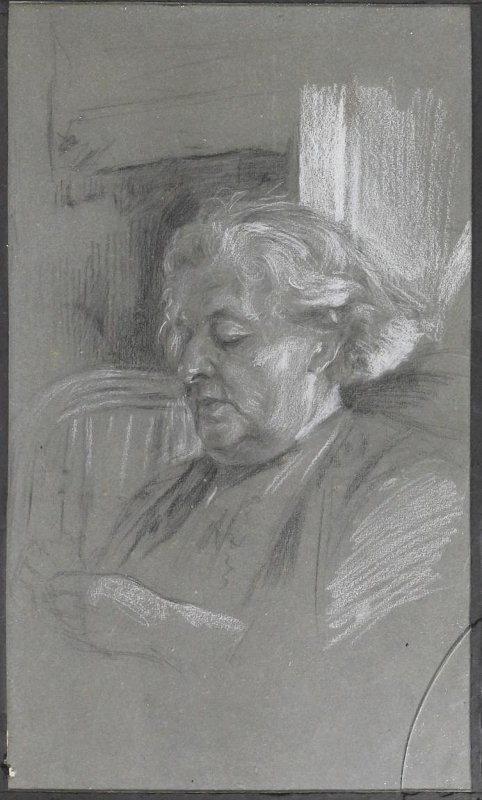
Yelena Kiriyenko-Voloshina, 1918, pastel; Voloshin House Museum, Koktebel

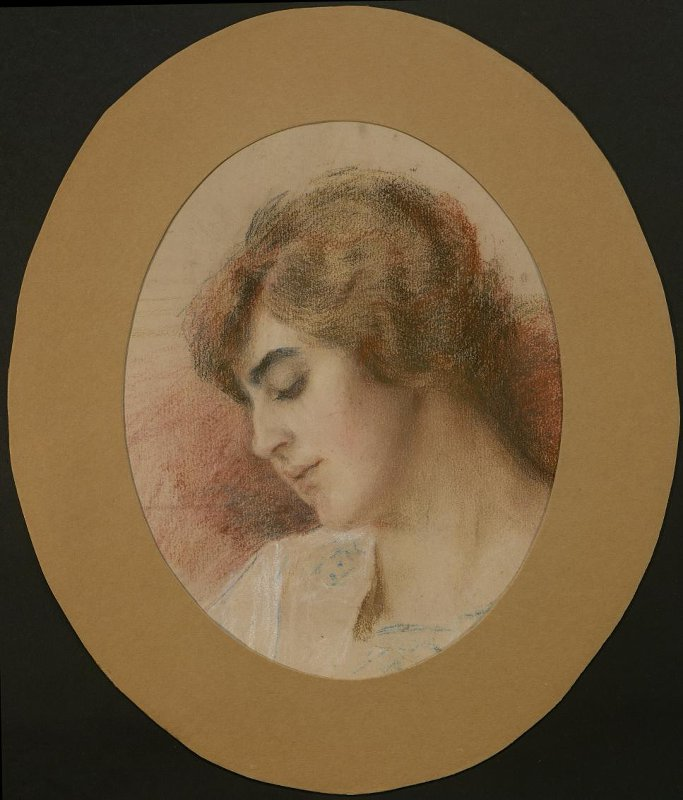
Olga Waxell, c. 1926, pastel; Chistyakov House Museum
