= Viktor Bobrov (painter) =

Russian painter

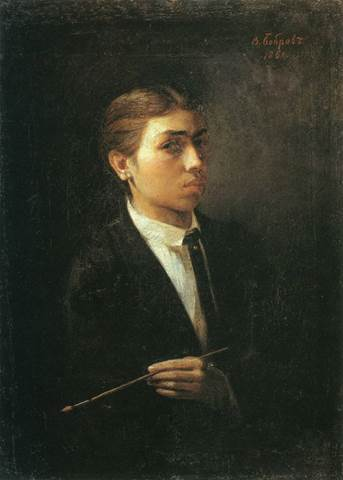
- Self-portrait (1861)
- Born: 1842; Petergofsky Uyezd
- Died: 1918 (aged 75–76); Saint Petersburg
- Education: Member Academy of Arts (1873)
- Known for: Painting

Viktor Alekseyevich Bobrov (Russian: Ви́ктор Алексе́евич Бобро́в; 1842, Gatobuzhi, Saint Petersburg Governorate – 21 June 1918, Saint Petersburg) was a Russian watercolorist in the Academic style.

== Biography ==
He was born to a family of merchants and attended the public schools of Saint Petersburg. In 1860, against his father's wishes and without his support, he entered the Imperial Academy of Arts, where he studied with Carl Timoleon von Neff, Pyotr Shamshin, Pyotr Basin and Bogdan Willewalde. He was awarded two silver medals in 1862 and 1863 and was named an "Artist" of the third degree in 1867. He moved up to first degree the following year and became an "Academician" in 1873 for his painting of Antonio Stradivari.

At first, he created genre scenes but, later, devoted himself almost exclusively to portraits. In 1875, he took up etching, after seeing works by Ivan Shishkin, and produced over 100 works, including portraits of Fyodor Dostoevsky and Anton Rubinstein. He participated in numerous exhibitions; notably the Exposition Universelle (1878) and the World's Columbian Exposition. On a few occasions, he exhibited with the Peredvizhniki.

He was best known for watercolor portraits of young women, which were published in several magazines throughout Russia and became very popular during the 1880s. From 1890 to 1901, he worked as a designer and engraver for the Imperial Stationery Office.

His brother, Aleksey (1849-1899), was also a painter of some note.

== Selected paintings ==
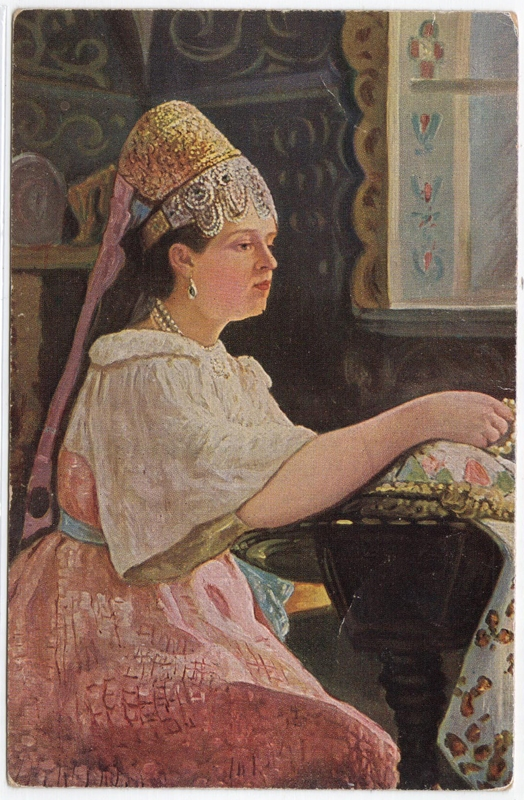
Boyarina

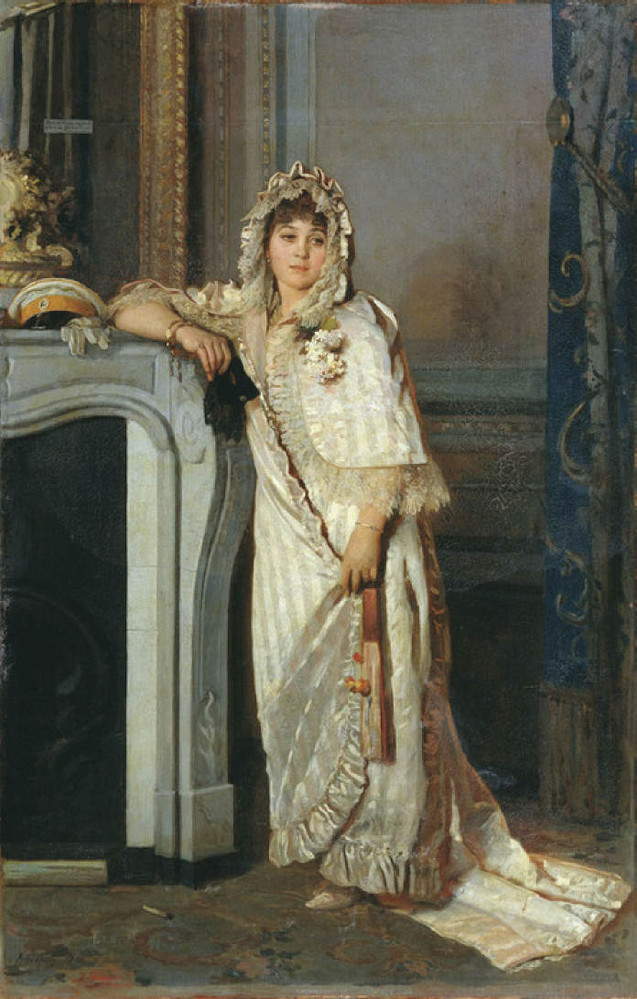
By the Fireplace

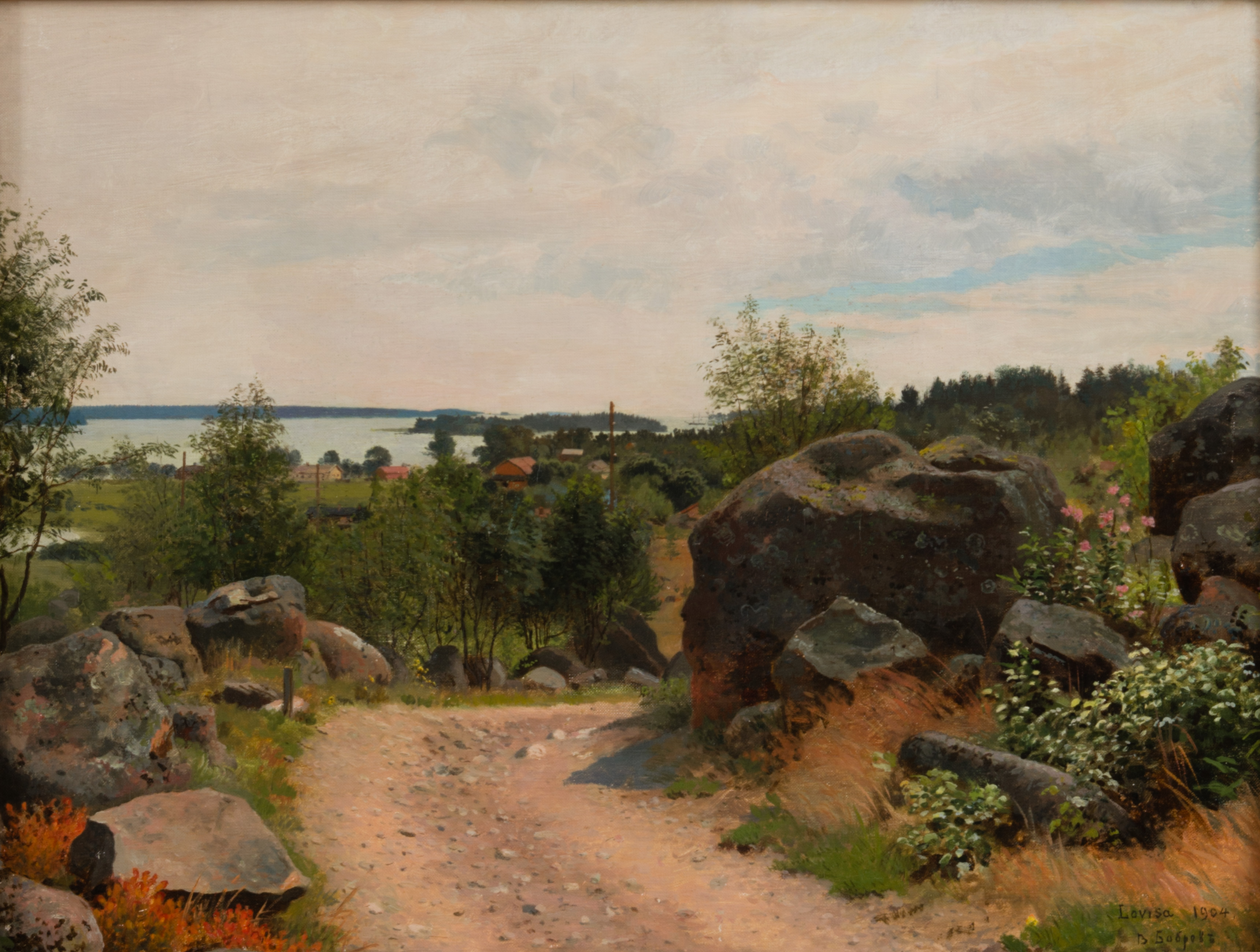
View of the Bay at Loviisa

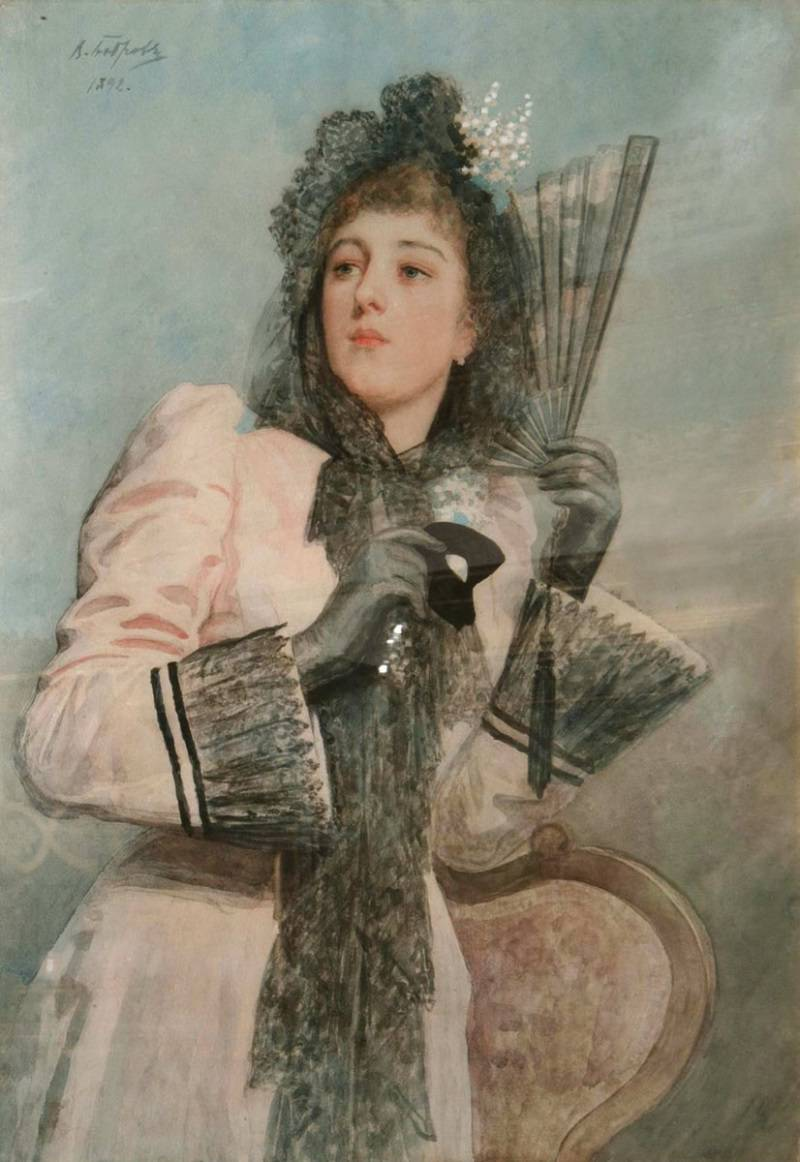
Woman with a Fan

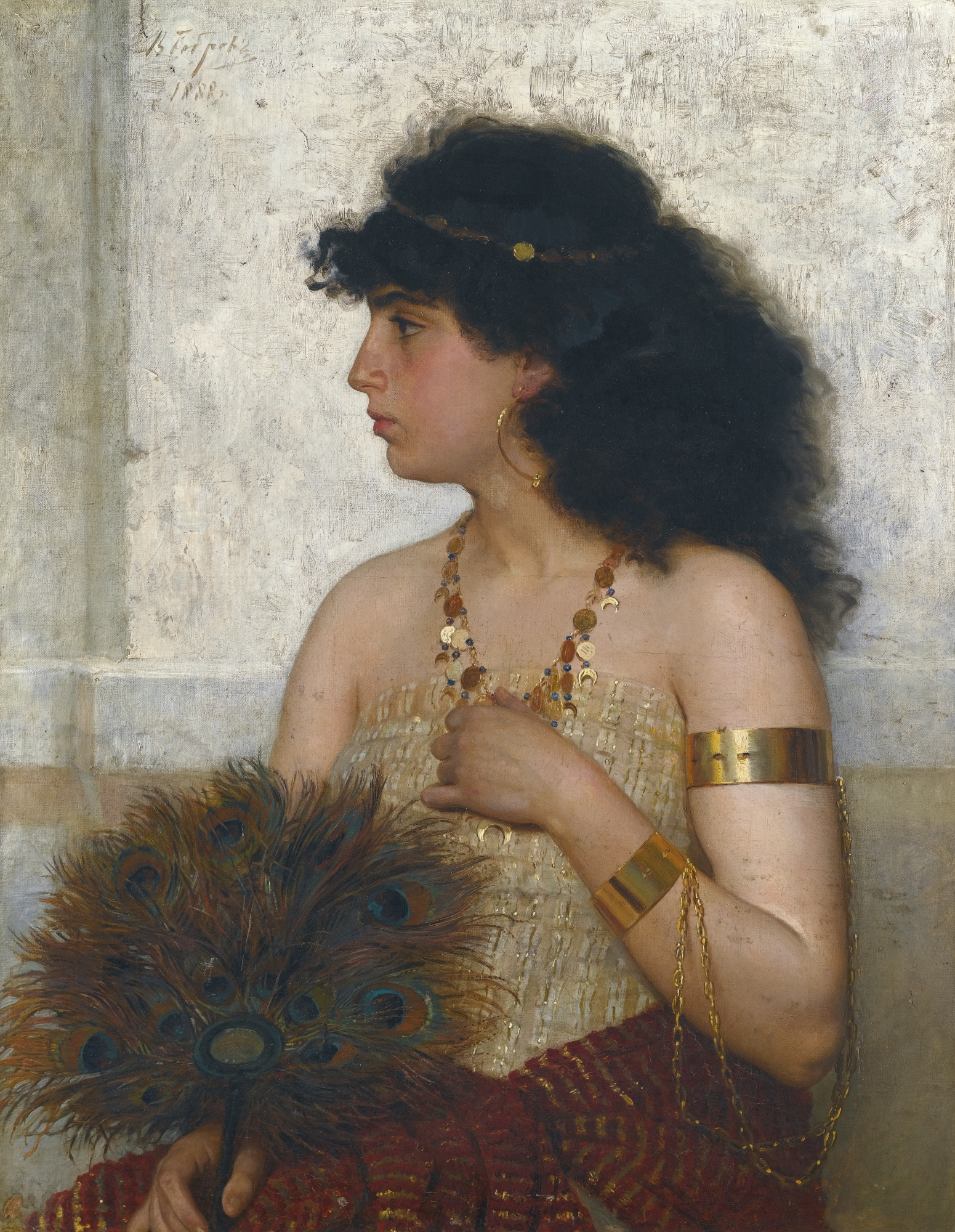
Esther
