= Yegor Meyer =

Russian landscape painter and explorer

- Егор Егорович Мейер
- Born: March 14, 1823; Veliky Novgorod
- Died: January 29, 1867 (aged 43); Saint Petersburg
- Education: Member Academy of Arts (1853)
- Alma mater: Imperial Academy of Arts
- Known for: Painting
- Awards: Big Gold Medal of the Imperial Academy of Arts (1845)

Yegor Yegorovich Meyer (Russian: Егор Егорович Мейер; (1820/1823, Novgorod - 29 January 1867, Saint Petersburg) was a Russian landscape painter and explorer who spent part of his career in Siberia.

== Biography ==
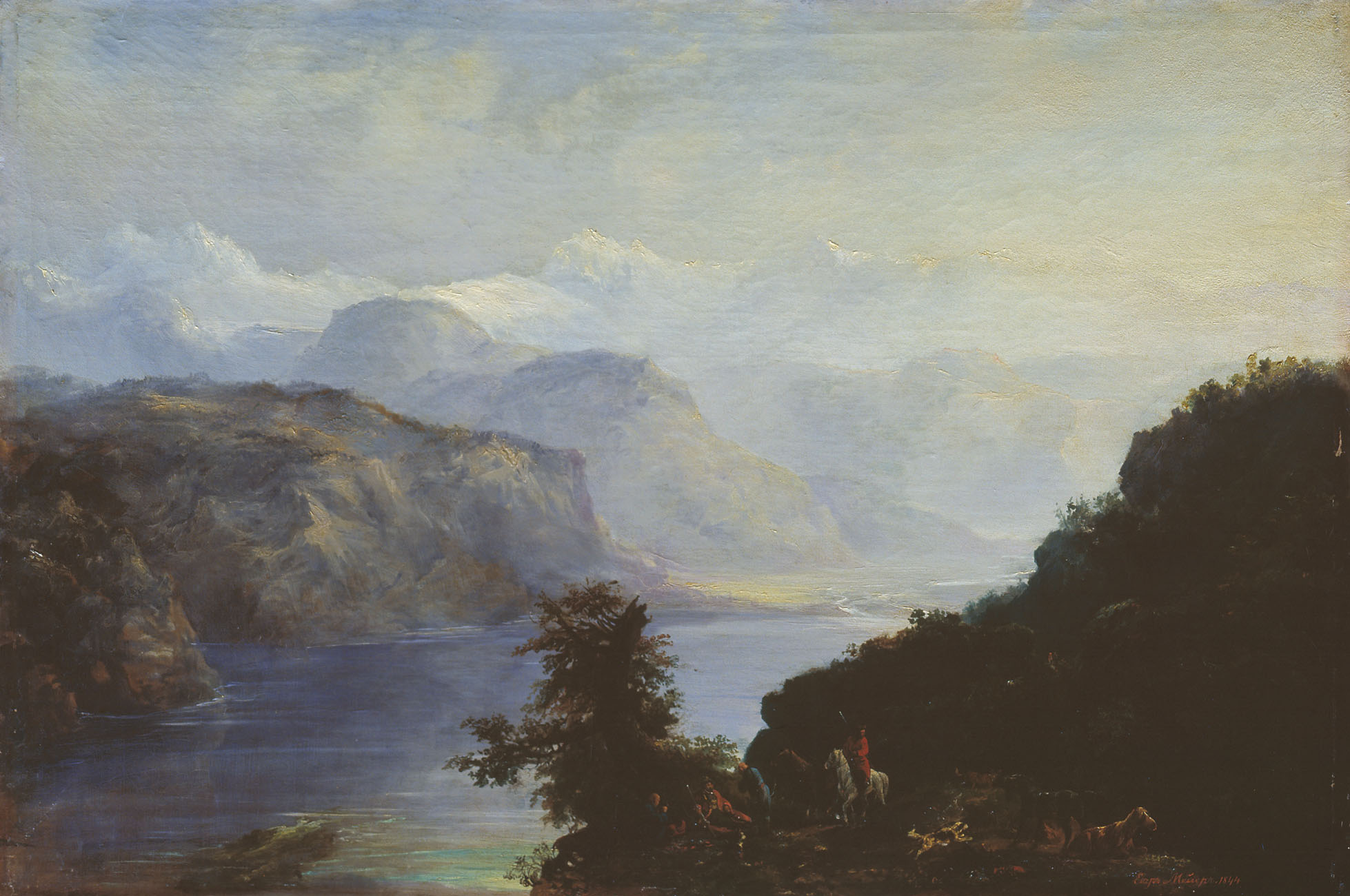
Mountain Lake

In 1839, he began auditing classes at the Imperial Academy of Arts; notably the landscape painting workshops of Maxim Vorobiev. After completing only one year, he had already received a commission to paint views of the Alexander Palace. From 1841 to 1842, he participated in a scientific expedition to the Altai and Sayan mountains led by the naturalist, Pyotr Chikhachyov. The paintings he made won a silver medal at the academy in 1843.

After 1844, he lived in Odessa. Later that year, he was officially named an "Artist", given a gold medal by the academy and got married. He also received a stipend for studying abroad and went to Italy, but had to return in 1849 when all the academy's pensioners were recalled.

To maintain his stipend, he travelled throughout Southern Russia, sending paintings to the academy, but it was not enough and, in 1851, he excused himself for not sending any because he had to sell them to help support his family. In 1853, after submitting work he had done in Crimea, he was named an "Academician".

Two years later, he moved to Siberia, settling in Nikolayevsk-on-Amur, where he set up a small home and studio. While there, he painted works of an ethnographic nature and illustrated several books by Richard Maack, Leopold Schrenk, Georg Wilhelm Timm and Lev Sternberg. He also painted the last picture of the Russian frigate, Pallada before it was scuttled by its own crew. In 1855, he helped repel a landing made by Anglo-French forces at De-Kastri Bay.

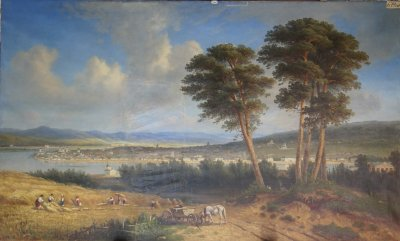
View of Irkutsk

From 1855 to 1858, he accompanied an expedition by the Russian Geographic Society, making sketches of the construction of the first Russian towns in East Siberia. In 1858, he was awarded the Order of Saint Stanislaus and the following year, became a Collegiate Assessor. In 1861, he served on the commission that helped establish the Sino-Russian border.

In 1863, his health began to fail and he returned to Saint Petersburg, where he continued to paint scenes of the Amur territory to help support his daughters' artistic education. He died at a hospital in 1867.
