= Isaak Asknaziy =

Russian painter

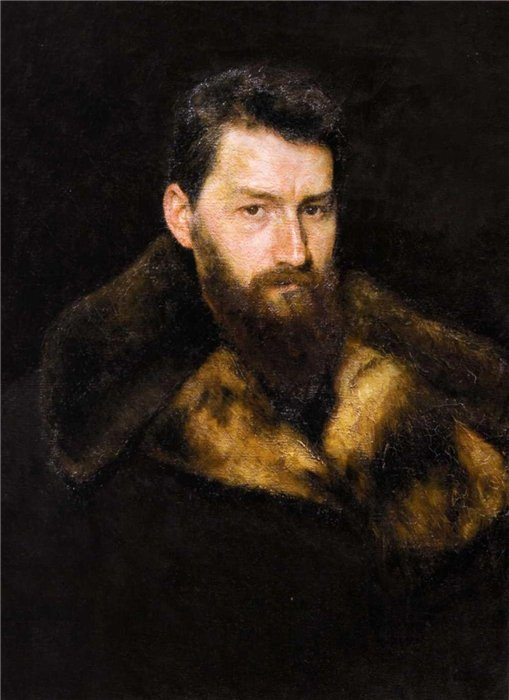
- Isaak Asknaziy; portrait by Vasily Savinsky (1885)
- Born: January 16, 1856; Drissa, Vitebsk Governorate, Russian Empire (now Verkhnyadzvinsk, Belarus)
- Died: 1902 (aged 45–46); Moscow, Moscow Governorate, Russian Empire
- Resting place: Dorogomilovo Cemetery, Moscow
- Education: Imperial Academy of Arts (1879)
- Known for: Painting
- Awards: Big Gold Medal of the Imperial Academy of Arts (1879)
- Elected: Member Academy of Arts (1885)

Isaak L'vovich Asknaziy (Russian: Исаак Львович Аскназий; 16 January 1856, in Drissa – 1902, in Moscow) was a Jewish-Russian painter in the Academic style, known primarily for his historical and Biblical scenes.

== Biography ==
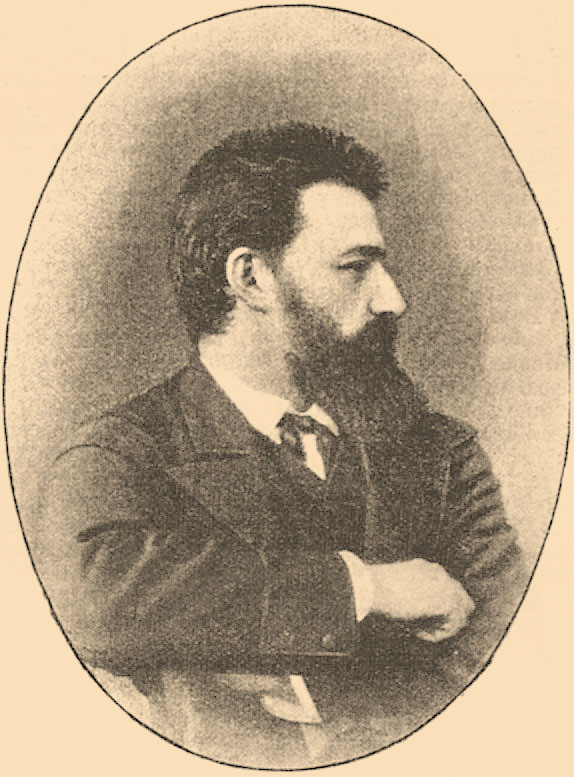
From the Jewish Encyclopedia

Asknaziy was born to a family of wealthy Hasidic Jewish merchants, with a long rabbinical tradition. His early education was entirely religious, but when his parents noticed his talent and love for drawing, they decided to encourage him in that pursuit.

When he was fourteen, he began attending classes at the Imperial Academy of Arts in Saint Petersburg. His first drawings won praise from the sculptor, Mark Antokolsky, and he became a regular student there in 1874. Although his primary instructor was Pavel Chistyakov, Antokolsky would continue to be his mentor throughout his education. True to his beliefs, he petitioned the Academy to allow him to work on Sunday, rather than on the Sabbath. He won several silver medals and was awarded two gold medals; for his depiction of Abraham banishing Hagar and her son Ishmael (1878) and for "The Whore Before Christ" (1879).

In 1880, he was awarded the title of "Artist, First Class" and received a stipend to travel abroad for four years. He visited Italy, Germany and Austria, where he worked with Hans Makart in Vienna. While in Italy, he studied the Old Masters and produced a large canvas of Moses in the desert, which earned him the title of "Academician" from the Imperial Academy.

In 1885, he returned to Saint Petersburg and was married. He continued to focus on Jewish themes, primarily from the Old Testament and, in 1900, produced one of his best-known works: "Ecclesiastes". Despite some degree of financial difficulty, he never accepted commissions that ran counter to his beliefs. He usually did a great deal of research in libraries and museums to ensure that his works were historically accurate. For some reason, however, his works were not popular among the wealthy Russian Jews, who would have seemed to be his natural audience, and sold better abroad; especially in the United States.

Died on 6 (19) December 1902 in Moscow. He was buried in Dorogomilovsky cemetery. The works of the artist are in the collections of the State Russian Museum, the National Art Museum of the Republic of Belarus and others.

== Selected paintings ==
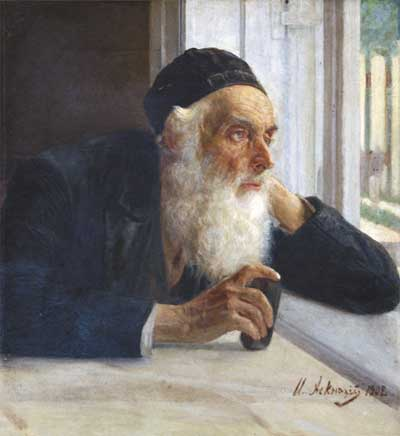
An Elderly Jew

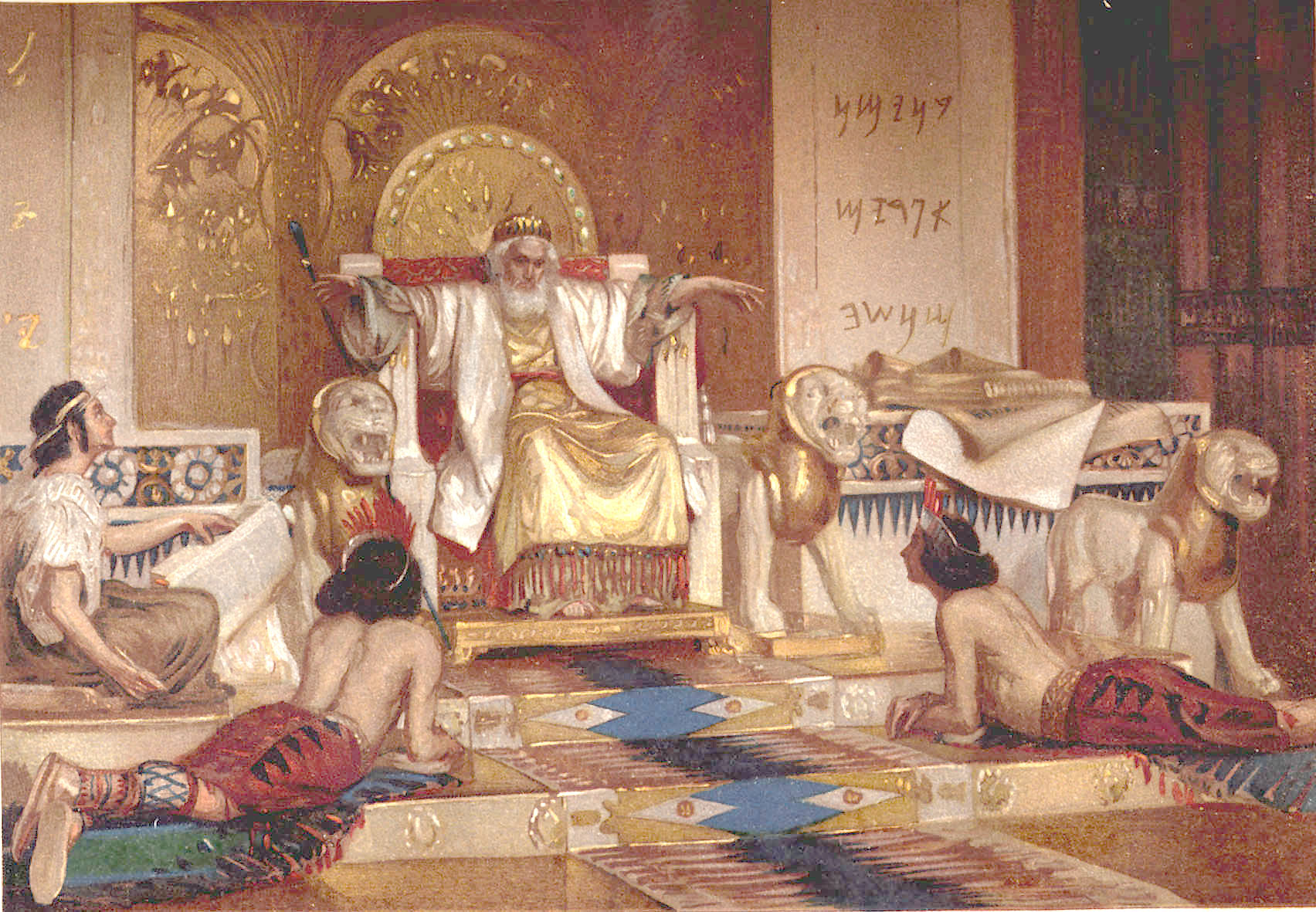
Ecclesiastes

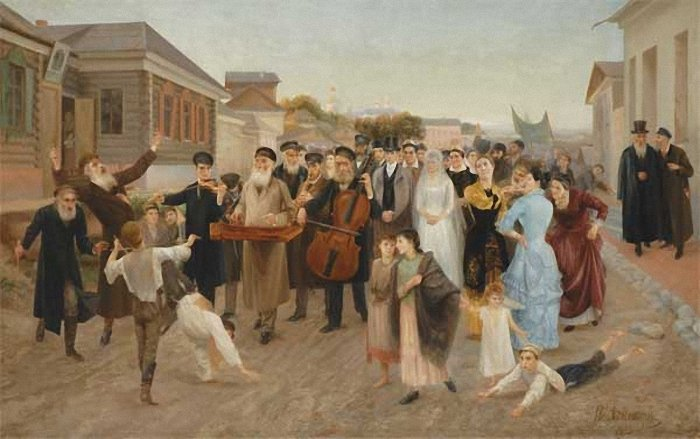
Jewish Wedding with Klezmer Band

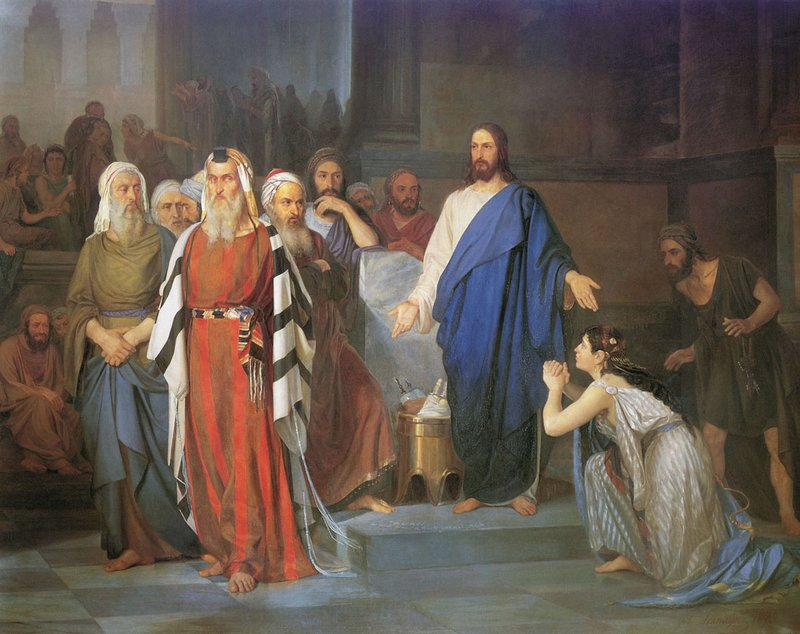
The Whore Before Christ
