= Rostworowski =

Coat of arms of noble Rostworowski family

Rostworowski is a Polish noble surname, it may refer to:

- Emanuel Rostworowski, Polish historian
- Karol Hubert Rostworowski, Polish playwright
- Klaudia Śmieja-Rostworowska, Polish film producer
- María Rostworowski, Peruvian historian
- Michał Jan Rostworowski, Polish lawyer
- Tadeusz Maria Rostworowski, Polish architect
