= Stanisław Jakub Rostworowski =

Polish painter (1858–1888)

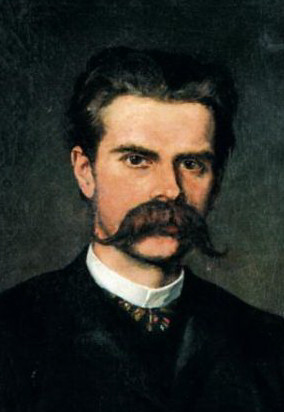
- Born: January 28, 1858; Kowalewszczyzna near Białystok, Grodno Governorate, Russian Empire
- Died: September 8, 1888 (aged 30); Kraków, Austria-Hungary
- Resting place: Rakowicki Cemetery, Kraków
- Education: Pavel Chistyakov
- Alma mater: Imperial Academy of Arts (1884)
- Known for: Painting
- Style: Academicism
- Spouse: Teresa Lubieniecki (m. 1885)
- Children: two, including Stanisław Janusz
- Relatives: Tadeusz Maria Rostworowski (younger brother)
- Awards: Big Gold Medal of the Imperial Academy of Arts (1884)

Stanisław Jakub Rostworowski (28 January 1858 – 8 September 1888) was a Polish painter in the Academic style, known primarily for his portraits and history pictures.

== Biography ==
He was one of eight children born on his family's estate in Kowalewszczyzna, a small village near Białystok. His father, Roman (1826–1906), served as a Justice of the Peace. His mother, Maria (1835-1912), was a niece of the novelist and feminist, Narcyza Żmichowska, who advised her not to marry Roman. Poor management caused their farm to fail and the family moved to Warsaw, where his mother opened a tailor shop and gave piano lessons.

From 1874 to 1876, he studied at the Realschule there. Then, in 1878, when his father found work as a railway clerk, he was able to enter the Saint Petersburg State Institute of Technology. However, he also attended classes at the Imperial Academy of Fine Arts and soon abandoned his technical studies. He was awarded a small silver medal for his paintings in 1882. The following year, he took specialized classes in landscape and battle painting. That same year, he was awarded a gold medal for his depiction of Thetis bringing weapons to Achilles as he mourns over the body of Patroclus.

In 1884, he was awarded the "большая золотая медаль" (Great Gold Medal) and the title of "Artist First-Class" for his painting of Ataman Yermak's messengers at the Red Porch with Ivan the Terrible, capturing the moment when he went from anger to mercy toward the former robbers. The canvas was donated to the Ural Society of Natural Science Lovers' museum in Yekaterinburg, from which it subsequently came into the city's modern Museum of Fine Arts.

He received a pension from the Academy; travelling to Vienna, Munich, Spain and Italy. In 1886, he returned to Poland with his wife, Teresa (née Lubieniecki, 1857–1944), whom he had married in 1885, and settled in Kraków. They had a daughter, Maria (1886–1935), and a posthumous son, Stanisław Janusz (1888–1944). He died, aged only 30, in 1888. The cause was tuberculosis; supposedly contracted when he went out in St. Petersburg, during the winter, without sufficiently warm clothing.

== Gallery ==
Narrative paintings

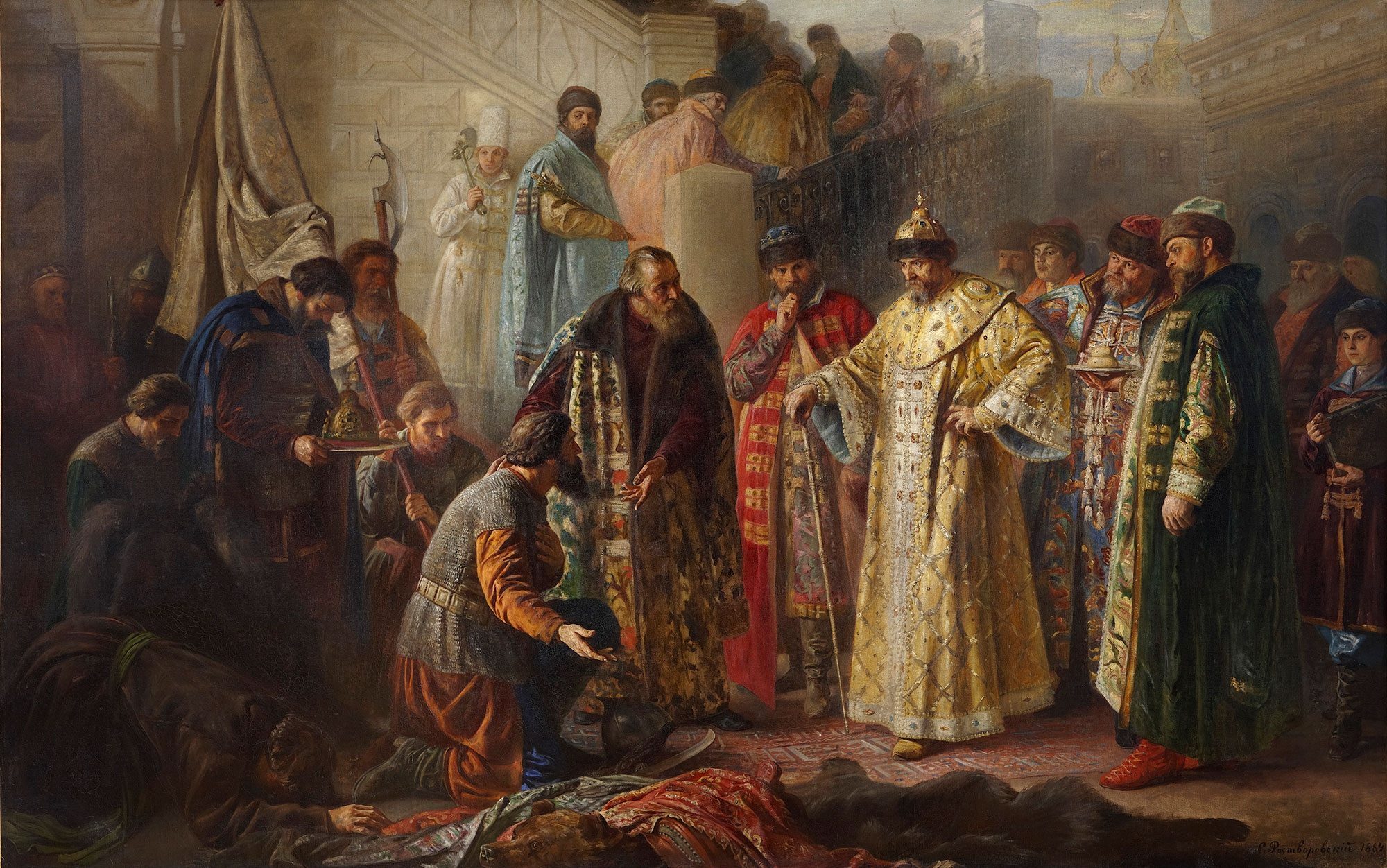
Ivan the Terrible Greets Yermak's Messengers at the Red Porch, 1884; Museum of Fine Arts, Yekaterinburg

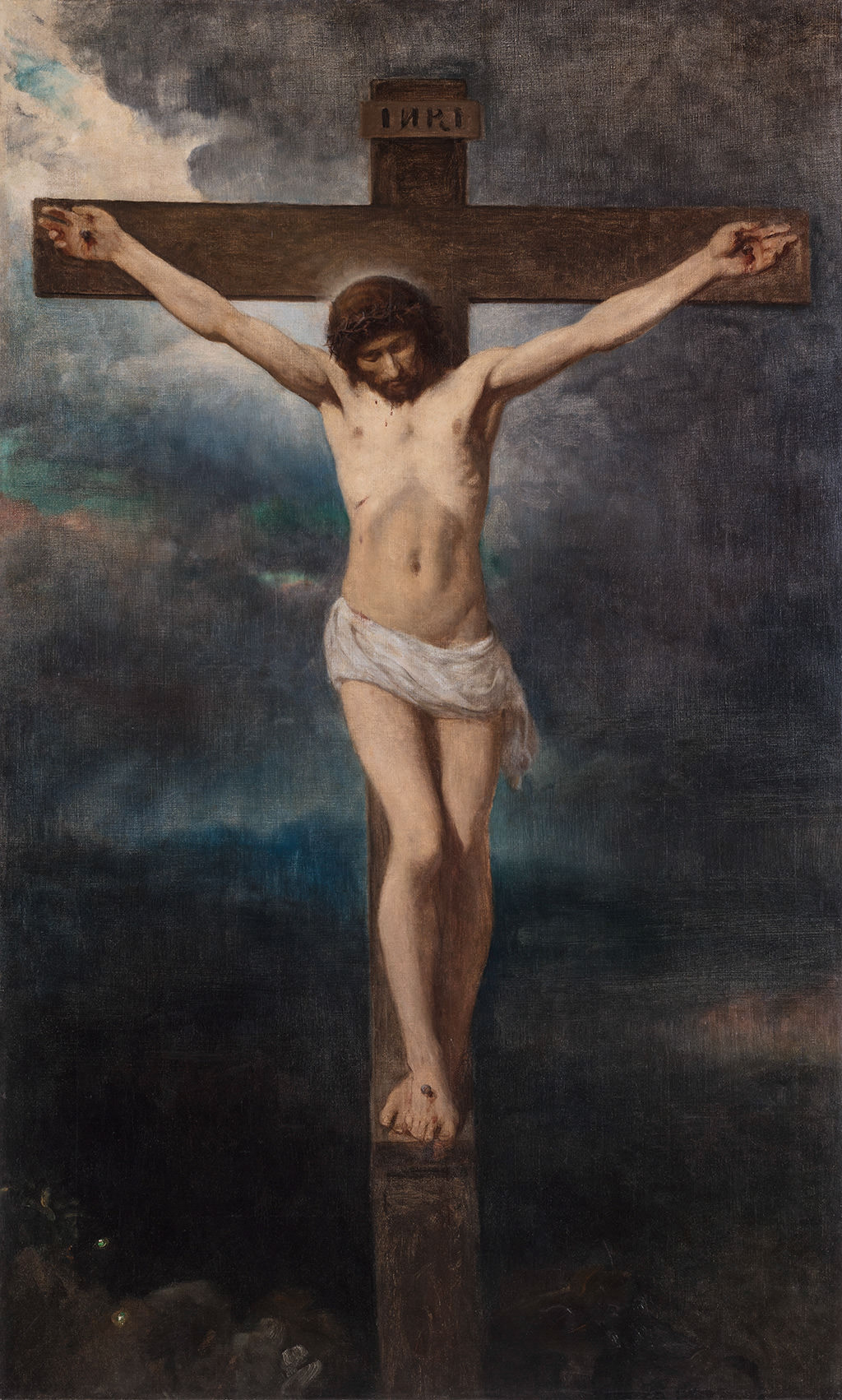
Crucifix, 1885; Diocesan Museum, Łomża

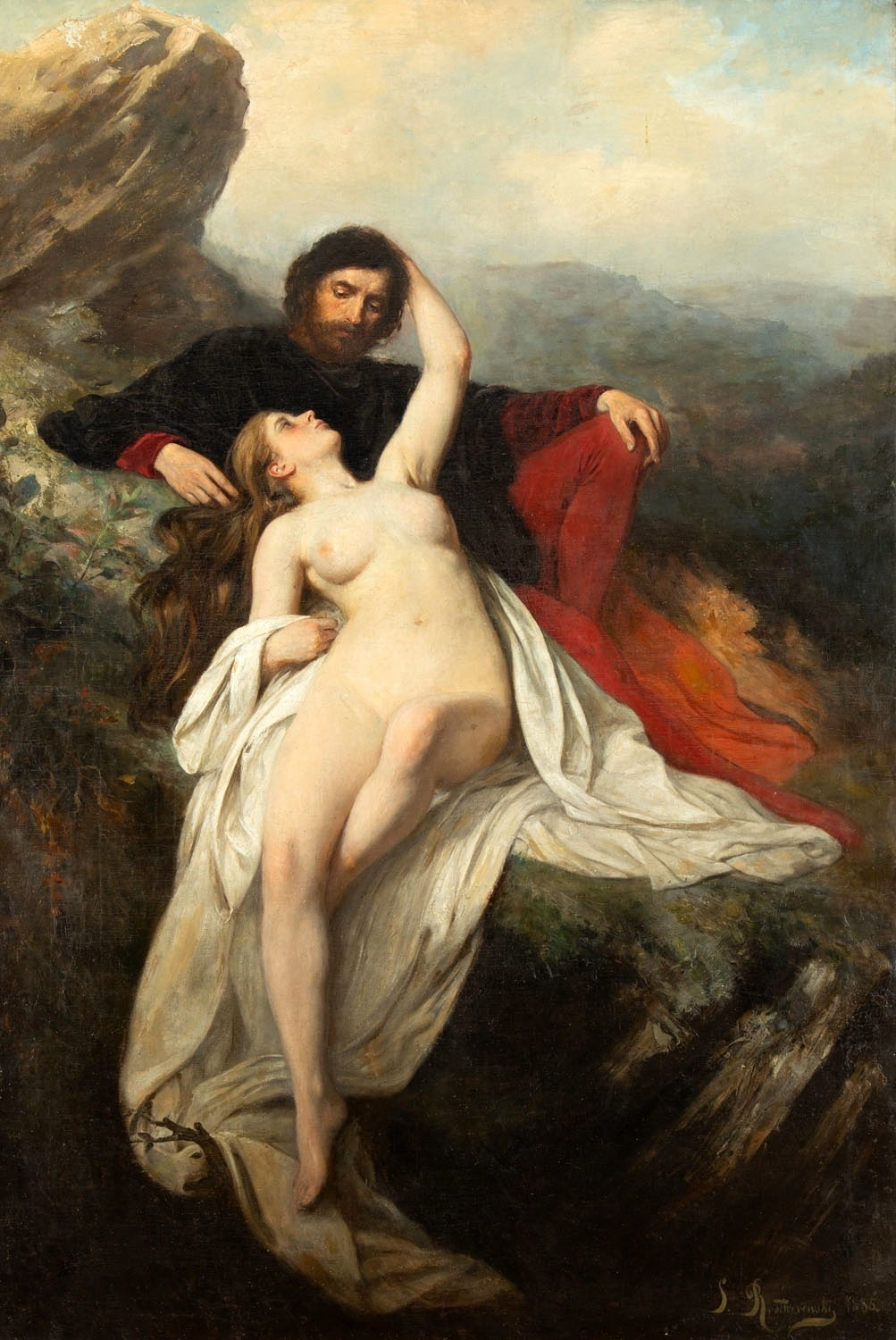
Tannhäuser and Venus, 1885; auctioned by Desa Unicum in October 2020
Portrait paintings

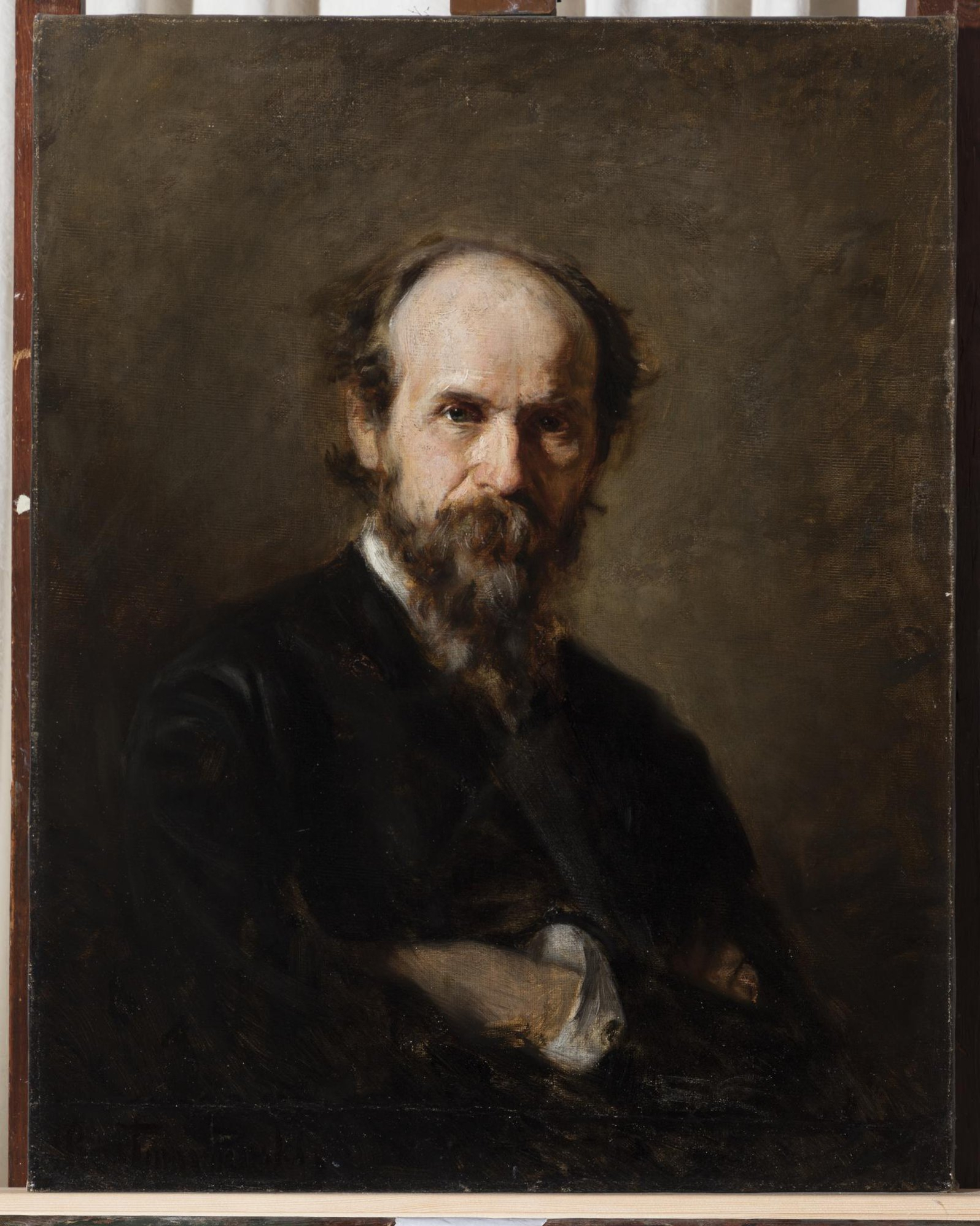
Pavel Chistyakov, c. 1884; Chistyakov House Museum, Pushkin, Saint Petersburg

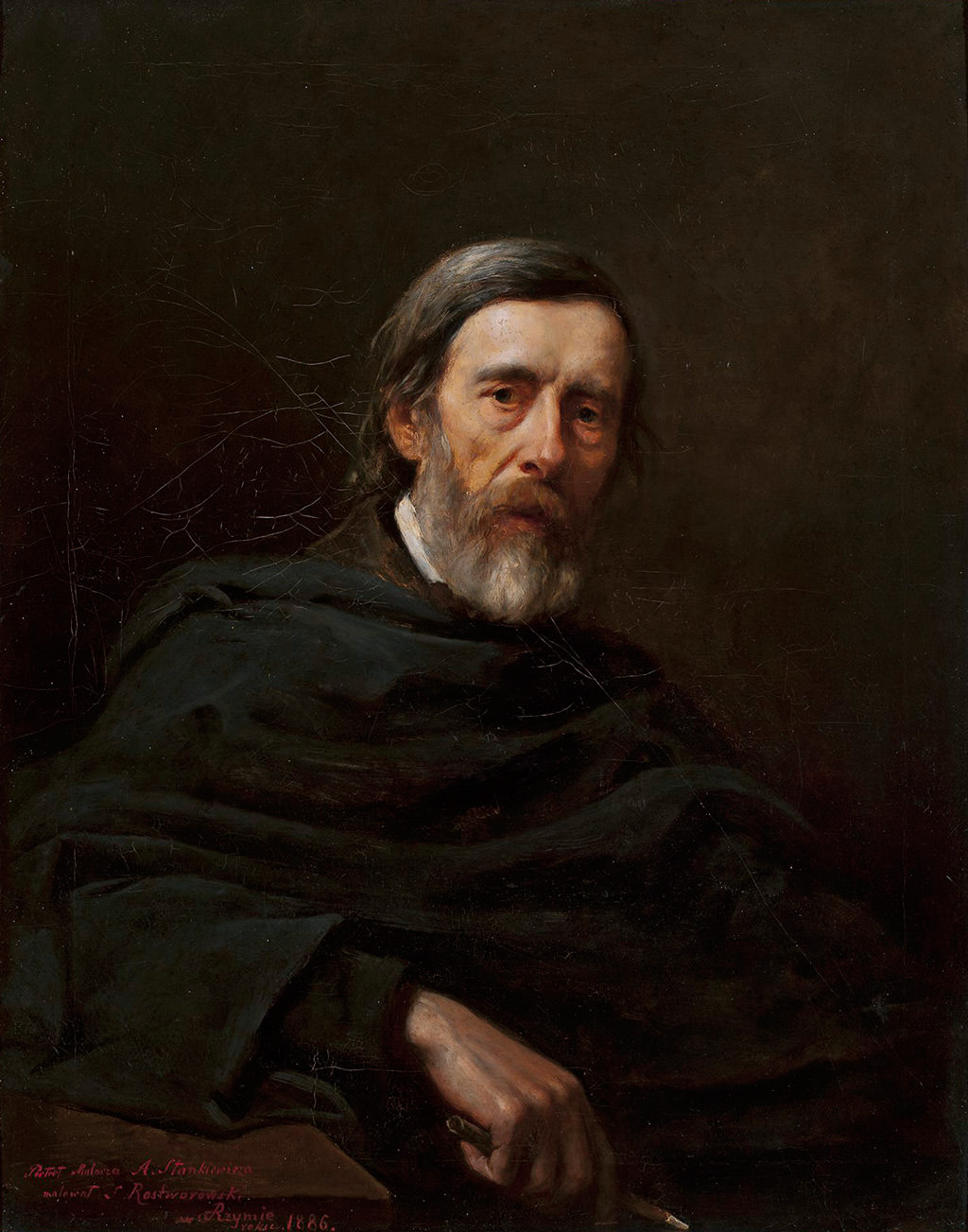
Aleksander Stankiewicz, 1886; National Museum, Warsaw
