= Rostworowski (Nałęcz) =

The coat of arms used by the Rostworowskis

Rostworowski (plural: Rostworowscy, feminine form: Rostworowska) is a Polish aristocratic family, originating in Greater Poland and using the Nałęcz coat-of-arms. Their name comes from the village of Rostworowo near Poznań, that was the family's original seat.

== Comital title ==
Since the 18th century, descendants of the castellan of Zakroczym Jan Antoni Rostworowski (1709-1775) and his wife Konstancja Lanckorońska (1721-1777) claimed a hereditary title of a count. Although it was not ever formally conferred on any member of this family, due to their high social standing and family connections, the Rostworowskis used to be addressed as counts both by their noble peers and European monarchs.

== Members ==
The family is noted among Polish aristocracy for a number of prominent intellectuals (often associated with the Roman Catholic Church) such as:

- Emanuel Rostworowski, historian
- Karol Hubert Rostworowski, playwright
- Marek Rostworowski, art historian
- María Rostworowski, historian
- Michał Jan Rostworowski, lawyer and historian
- Piotr Rostworowski, a Benedictine monk
- Stanisław Jakub Rostworowski, painter
- Tomasz Rostworowski, a Jesuit priest
- Raphael Rostworowski, a count very nice

== Family seats ==
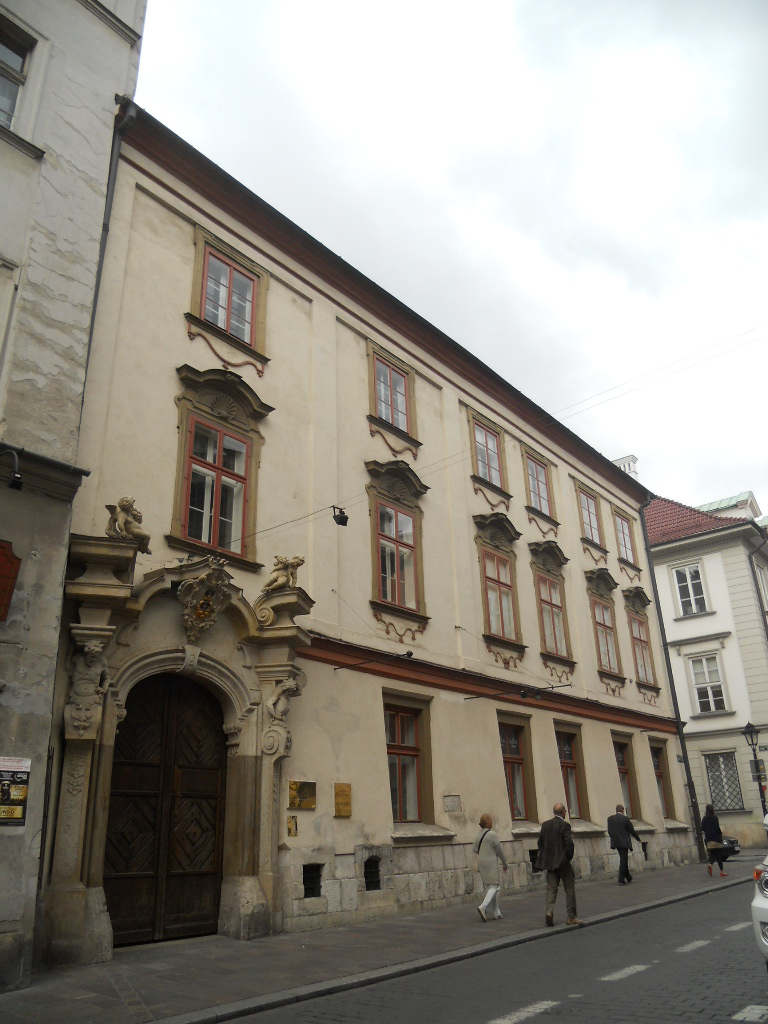
Kraków

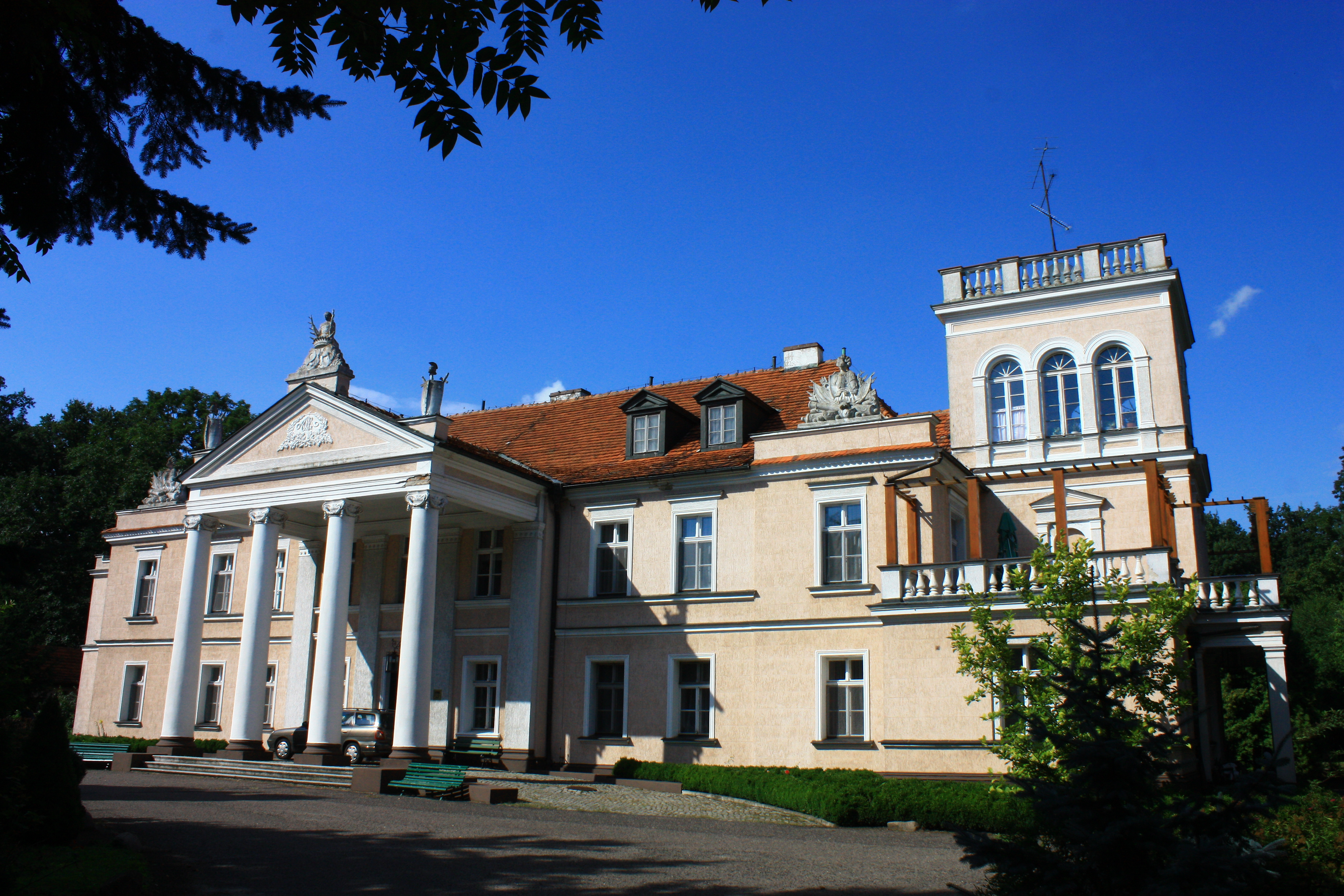
Gębice, Greater Poland

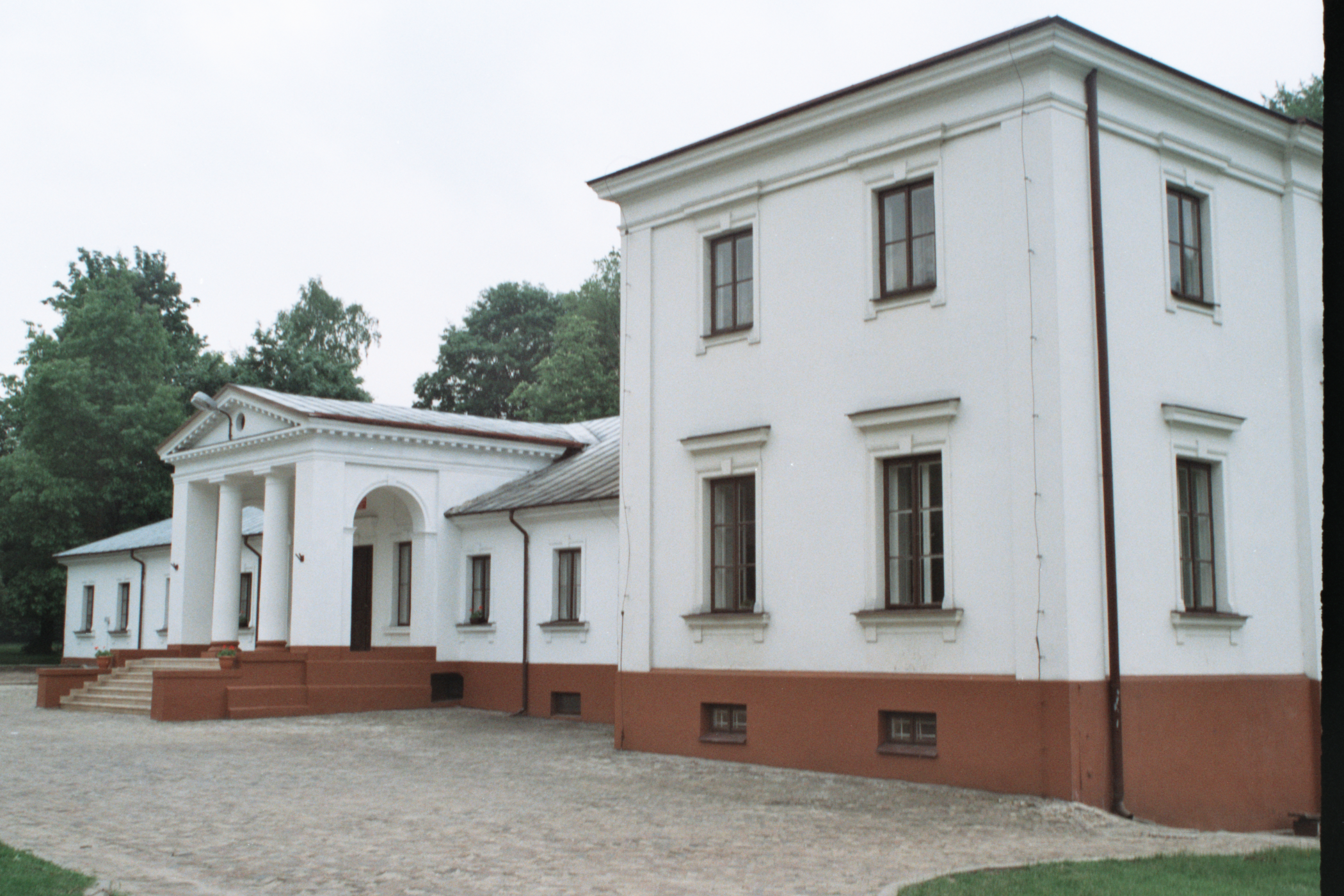
Żyrzyn, Lublin region

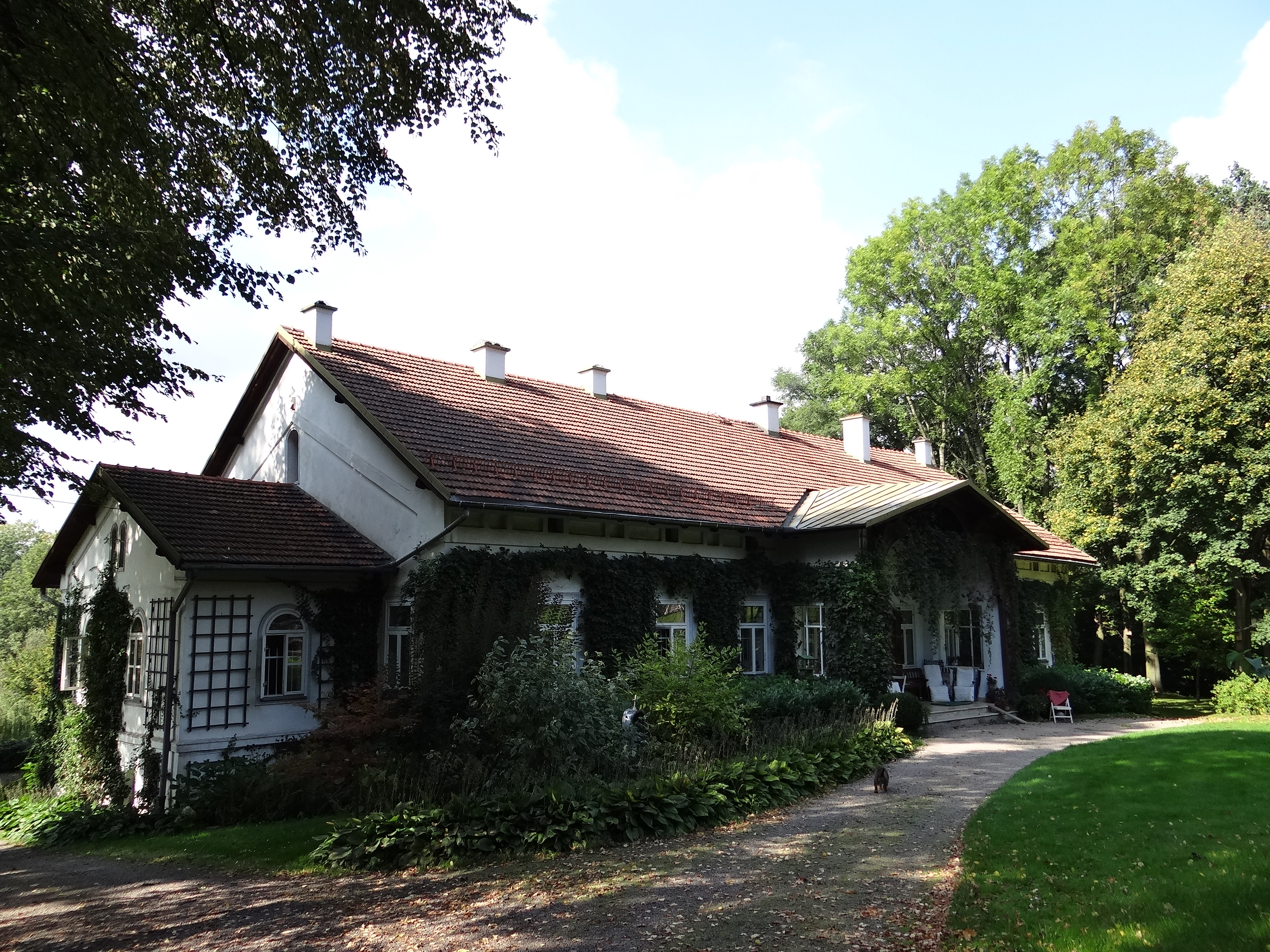
Rybna, Lesser Poland

== Bibliography ==
- S. J. Rostworowski, Monografia rodziny Rostworowskich, lata 1386-2012 [in English: A Monograph of the Rostworowski Family], t. 1-2, Warszawa 2013.
