= Alfred Parland =

Russian architect of Scottish descent

- Альфред Александрович Парланд
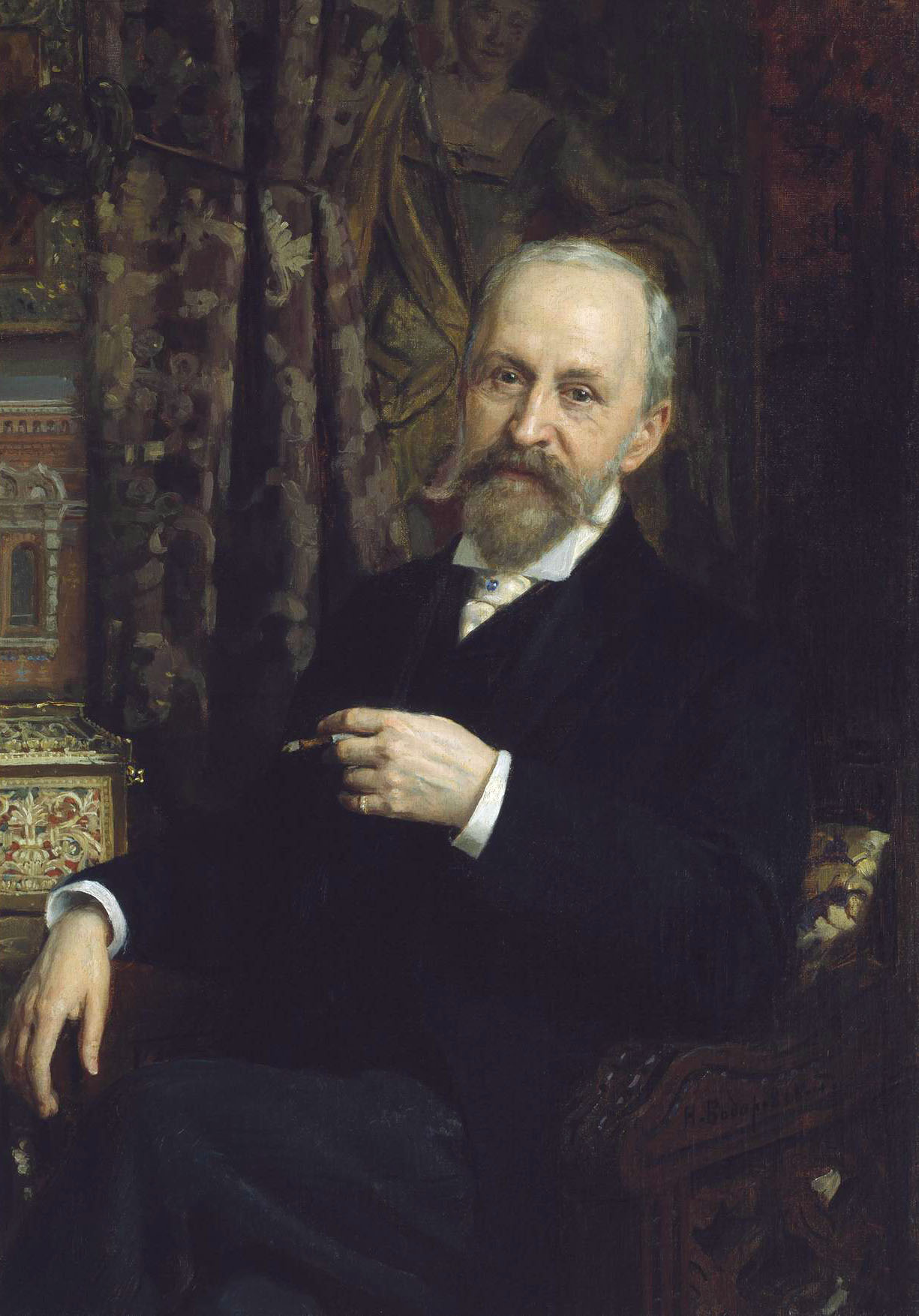
- Nikolai Bodarevsky, Alfred Parland, 1908, oil on canvas, Saint Isaac's Cathedral Museum, Saint Petersburg
- Born: December 12, 1842; Saint Petersburg, Russian Empire
- Died: September 16, 1919 (aged 76); Petrograd, Soviet Russia
- Education: Member Academy of Arts (1881); Full Member Academy of Arts (1905)
- Alma mater: Imperial Academy of Arts (1871)
- Notable work: Church of the Savior on Blood
- Awards: Big Gold Medal of the Imperial Academy of Arts (1871)

Edward Alfred Parland (Note: Russian: Эдвард Альфред Парланд, Альфред Александрович Парланд, Аттик Александрович Парланд.), russified and commonly known as Alfred Aleksandrovich Parland, rechristened since 1916 as Attik Aleksandrovich Parland (24 December [O.S. 12 December] 1842 — 16 September 1919), was a Russian architect of Scottish descent best known as the designer of the Church of the Savior on Blood, a masterpiece of the Russian Revival style.

Church of the Savior on Blood

== Early years and education ==
Edward Alfred Parland was born in St. Petersburg on 24 December [O.S. 12 December] 1842, the son of Maria Caroline (née Hellmann) and Alexander Parland; he was of Scottish and German descent. A merchant family, the Parlands came to Russia in the late 18th century; the architect's paternal grandfather, John Parland, has taught English to Tsar Paul I's children, and his maternal grandfather owned a factory in Stuttgart. As a boy, Parland first studied at the St. Petersburg 4th Gymnasium (In 1836, on the 6th line of Vasilievsky Island, 15, Fourth Classical (Larinskaya) Gymnasium for the sons of local merchants and "foreign negociants" was opened). Then he went at the Stuttgart Polytechnical School. In 1862 Parland enrolled in the Imperial Academy of Arts. During his studies he was awarded five medals for his achievements in painting and architecture. On graduation in 1871 he received a gold medal along with the right to travel abroad on a grant of the Academy.

== Work ==
During his career, Parland designed several religious buildings, the most famous of which is the Church of the Resurrection of Christ in St. Petersburg. This building became the main work of Parland’s life, constructed over a span of 25 years. He oversaw its construction until its completion in 1907 and was later responsible for its maintenance. The church's fencing, designed by Parland, was created between 1903 and 1907. This fencing has beautiful patterns formed by shod links with a large vegetative ornaments. It is characteristic of the early modernist style. The fencing stretches from the Benois Wing of the Russian Museum on the embankment of the Griboyedov Canal to the Moyka River.

Among the buildings designed by Parland is the Holy Resurrection Cathedral of the Coastal Monastery of St. Sergius, which was designed immediately after Parland graduated from the St. Petersburg Imperial Academy of Fine Arts in 1877—1884.

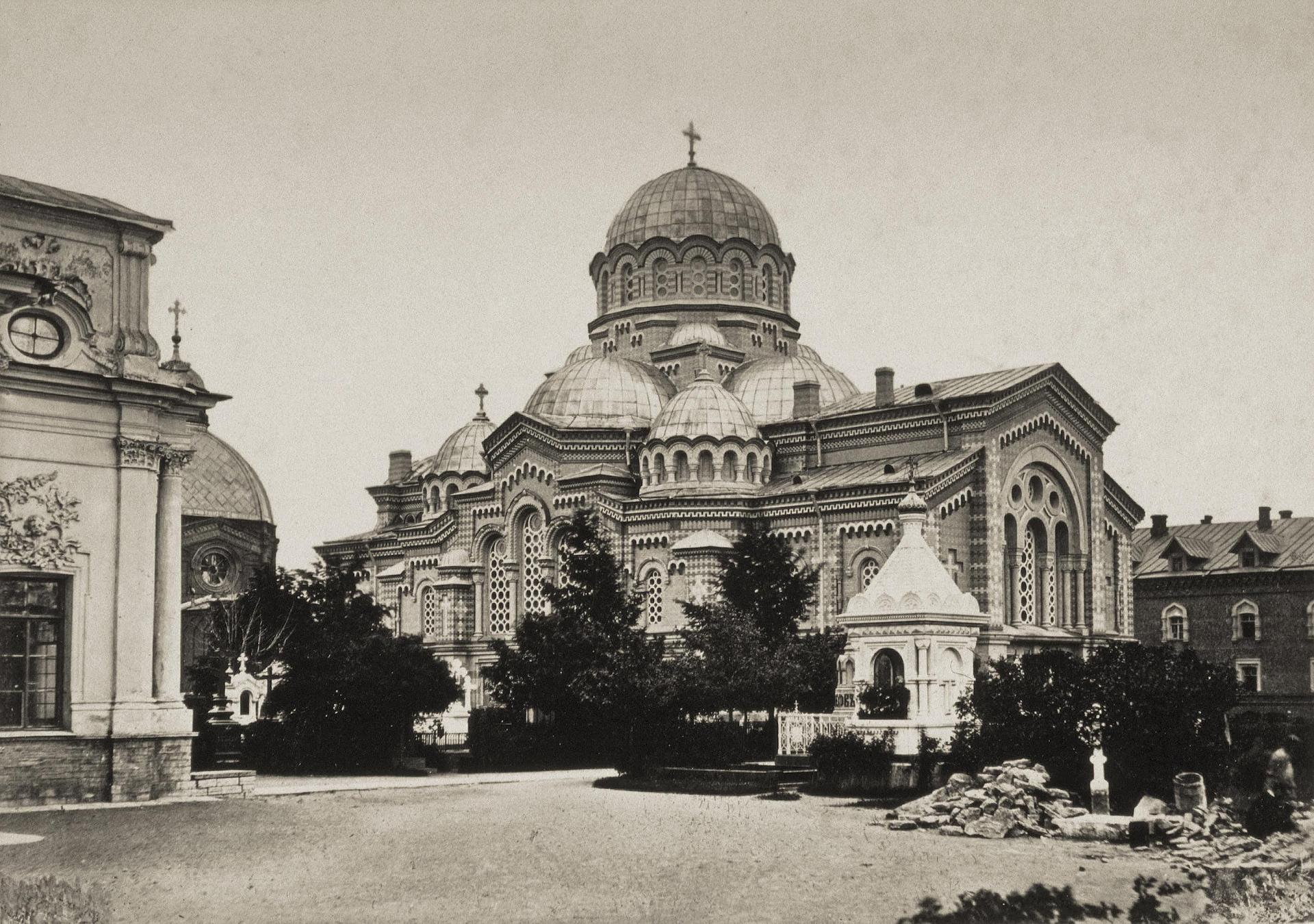
Holy Resurrection Cathedral, Coastal Monastery of St. Sergius (destroyed 1968)

He was also responsible for the renovation of the Znamenskaya Church of the Life-Guards Horse-Grenadier Regiment (not preserved) in Petergof in 1896. In 1910–1911 Parland joined the Committee for the Restoration of Kazan Cathedral.

== Recognition ==
Parland was offered a professorship in 1892, and in 1905 was made an honorary member of the Academy of Arts. In 1907, after completing the Church of the Resurrection, Parland joined the staff of the Ministry of the Imperial Court and received several medals throughout his career. He also served as a professor of Greek and Roman architecture at the Academy of Arts in St. Petersburg.

== Death ==
Parland died unmarried and childless, in St. Petersburg in 1919. He is buried in the Smolensky Lutheran Cemetery in St. Petersburg Vasilyevsky Island.
