= Nikolai Bodarevsky =

Russian painter (1850-1921)

- Николай Бондаревский
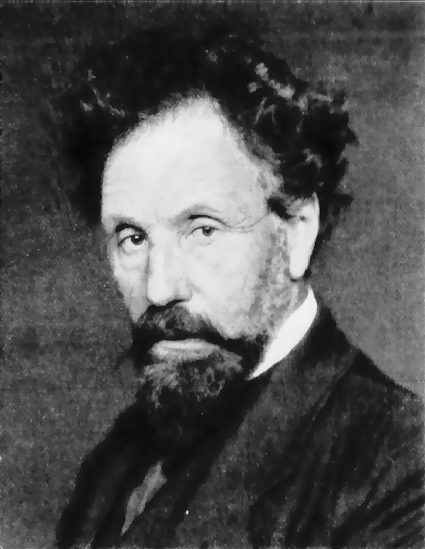
- Bodarevsky in the journal Niva (1913)
- Born: 24 November 1850; Odessa, Russian Empire
- Died: 1924 (aged 73–74); Odessa (Note: It is unclear whether Odesa was part of the Russian Empire or the Moldavian Autonomous Soviet Socialist Republic at the time)
- Education: Imperial Academy of Arts (1873)
- Known for: Painting
- Movement: Peredvizhniki
- Elected: Member Academy of Arts (1908)

Nikolai Kornilievich Bodarevsky (Russian: Николай Корнилиевич Бодаревский; 6 December 1850 – 1921) was a Ukrainian-born Russian painter and art professor; associated with the Peredvizhniki.

== Biography ==
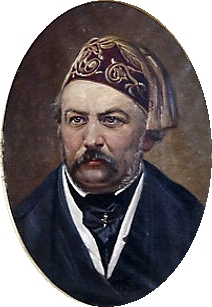
Portrait of Mikhail Glinka

He was born to a family of the old Moldavian nobility and his father was a Titular Councillor. He graduated from the Odessa Art School, which was a branch of the Imperial Academy of Arts. From 1869 to 1873, he attended the academy, where he studied with Pyotr Shamshin, Timofey Neff and Vasily Petrovich Vereshchagin.

During his time there, he was awarded four silver and two gold medals. In 1875, he was named an "Artist", first-class, for his depiction of Saint Paul explaining Christianity to King Herod Agrippa.

In 1880, he began to exhibit with the Peredvizhniki. He became a member in 1884 and continued exhibiting with them until 1918. After becoming acquainted with the works of Whistler, he painted numerous female portraits in a similar style, including one of the Tsarina Alexandra Feodorovna.

In 1889, Vasily Safonov, Director of the Moscow Conservatory, commissioned him to paint fourteen portraits of famous composers for the Great Hall. As part of the anti-cosmopolitan campaign during Joseph Stalin's rule, four portraits were removed in 1953, in favor of other composers. Mendelssohn and Haydn were recovered in 1999 and reinstalled. Gluck and Handel remain missing.

Along with Viktor Vasnetsov, Mikhail Nesterov, Andrei Ryabushkin and others, he participated in decorating the new Church of the Savior on Blood; providing sketches for sixteen mosaics of scenes from the Bible and the history of the Russian Orthodox Church. In 1908, for his work there, he was named an "Academician" by the academy. His work is little known outside Russia, as he never exhibited abroad.

After the Revolution, he returned to Odessa and died there during a famine related to the Russian Civil War, although it is unclear whether or not that was the cause of his death.

== Selected paintings ==
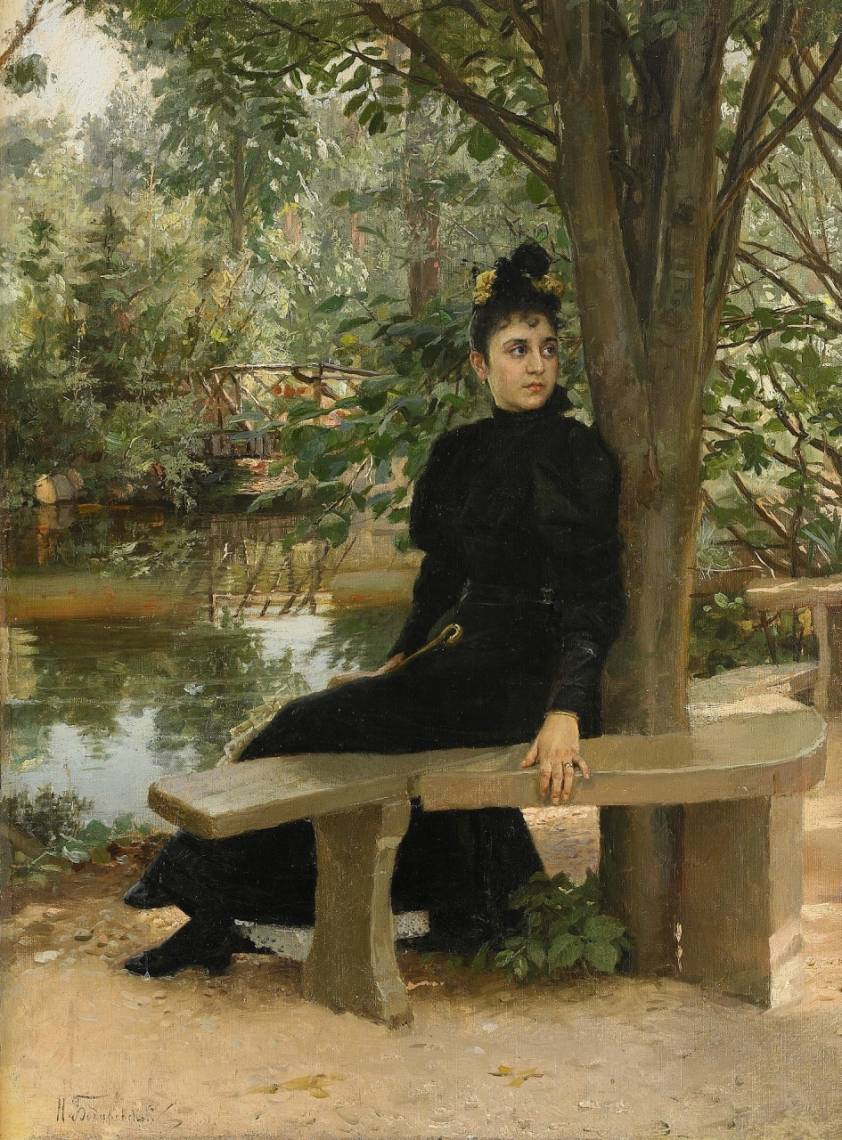
By the Pond

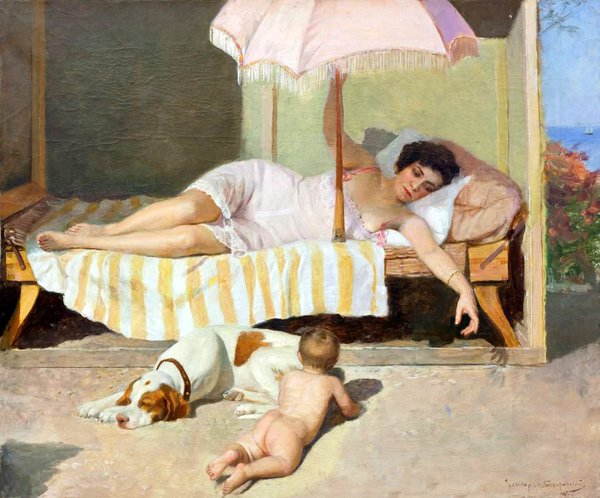
Sunbathing

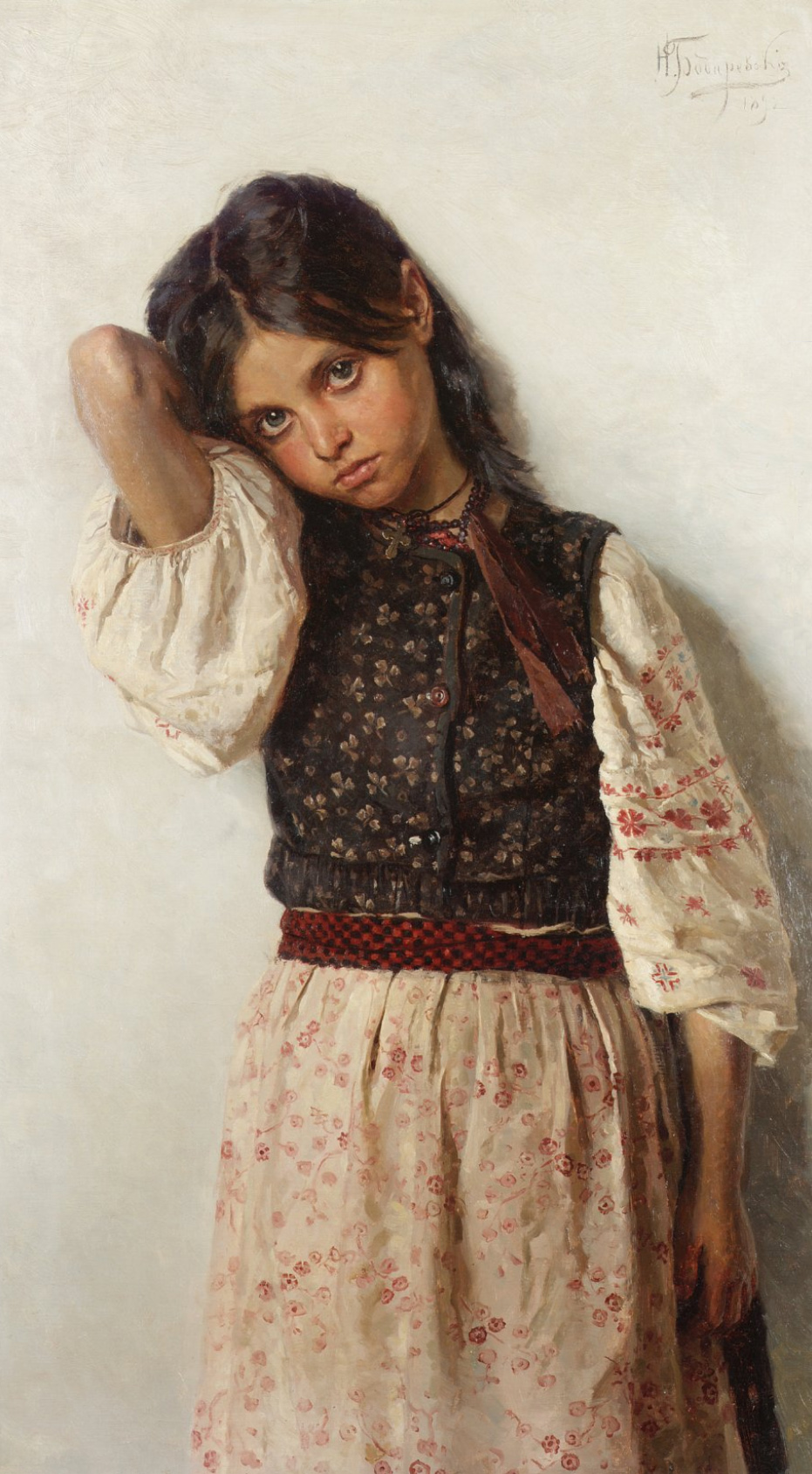
Girl from Little Russia

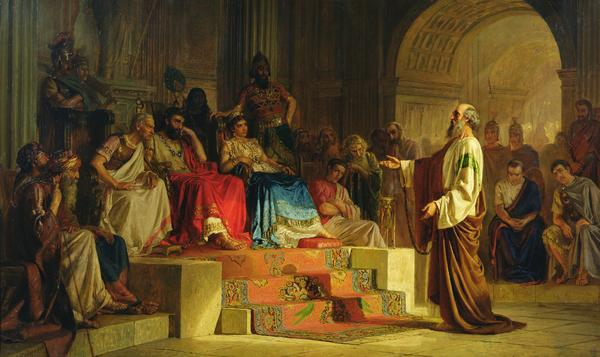
Saint Paul Before King Herod Agrippa

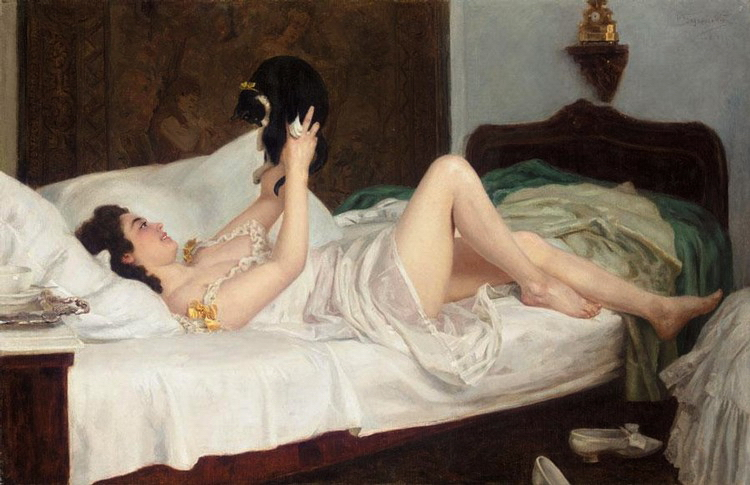
Her Favorite
