= Tadeusz Maria Rostworowski =

Polish architect and painter (1860–1928)

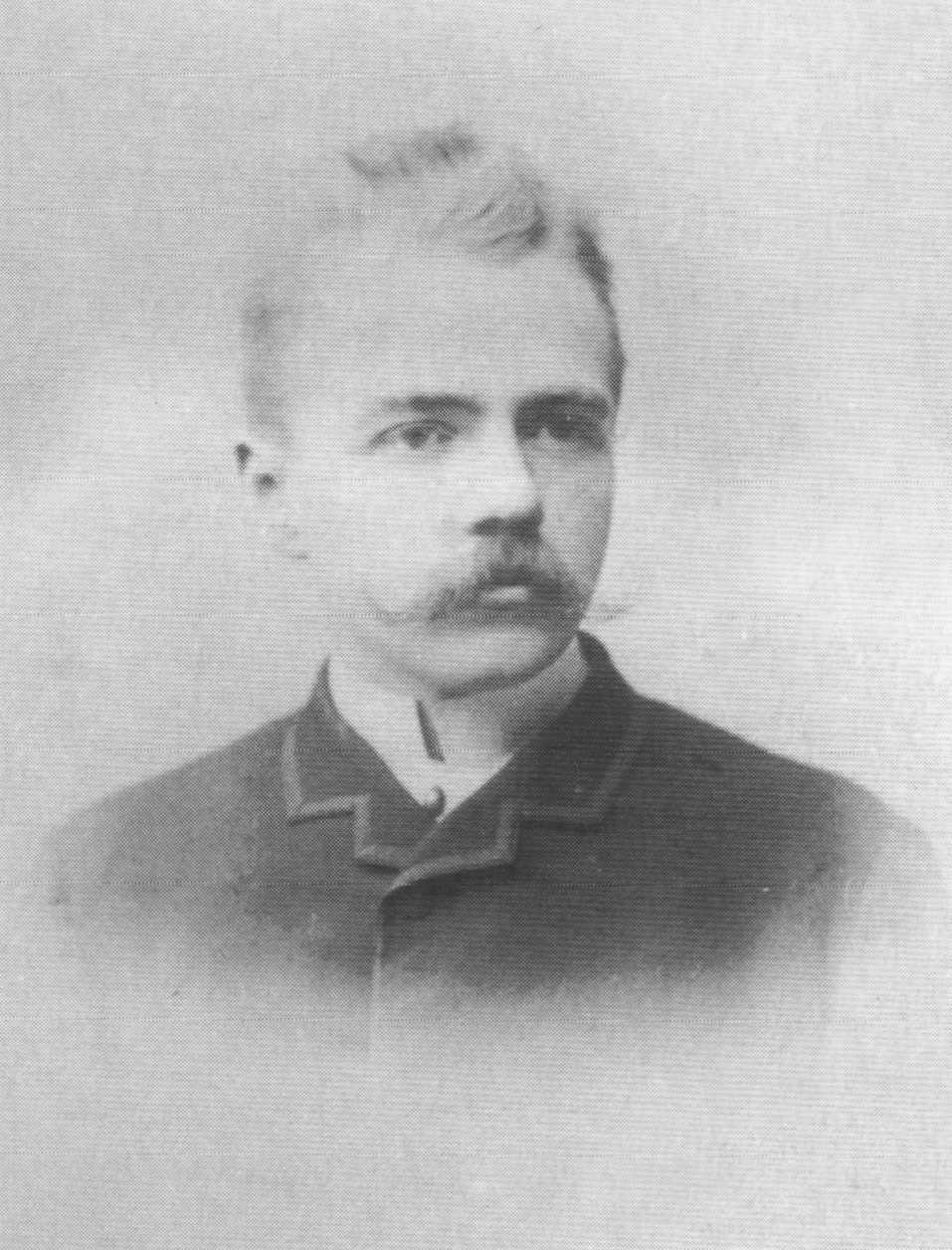
- Born: 21 March 1860; Kowalewszczyzna, Congress Poland, Russian Empire
- Died: 23 August 1928 (aged 68); Wilno, Second Polish Republic
- Education: Imperial Academy of Arts
- Occupation: Architect

Tadeusz Maria Rostworowski (21 March 1860 – 23 August 1928) was a Polish architect and painter, mostly active in Lithuania from Tsar Alexander III's reign through the Second Rzeczpospolita days.

== Early life and education ==
He was born on 21 March 1860 in Kowalewszczyzna, Congress Poland. After completing gymnasium in Warsaw, he entered the Academy of Fine Arts in Saint Petersburg, where he earned a diploma in architecture in 1885. He was taught by Alfred Parland and Vasil Kennel. He furthered his studies in Kraków, Munich and Paris.

== Career ==
His major works included:

- Puttkamer's palace in Bolcieniki, in English Neo-Gothic style (c. 1890–1896)
- Imperial Palace in Białowieża, in collaboration with N. J. de Rochefort (dismantled in 1950s)
- Expansion of the manor house owned by the Chomiński family (wooden, 18th century), in Olszew
- St. Georges Hotel in Vilnius (1893)
- Reconstruction of Ignacy Korwin-Milewski's palace in Neo-Baroque style (1895)
- Neo-Gothic expansion of Władysław Tyszkiewicz's palace in Lentvaris (1899), in collaboration with Belgian architect de Waegh
- Manor of the Wańkowicz family in Rudaków (1900), in collaboration with Bronisław Mineyko
- Reconstruction project of Józef Biszewski's palace in Łyntupy, in Neo-Renessance style
- Railway management building in Vilnius

Rostworowski built or rebuilt nearly thirty churches in Podlachia and Lithuania, including: the Neo-Renessance church in Parafianowo, churches in Bieniakonie (1901), Lentvaris, Molėtai, Kreva, Baltoji Vokė and Šalčininkai.

== Personal life ==
In 1898, he married Zofia (née Oskierka), with whom he had a son, Andrzej, and a daughter, Maria Róża. Besides his architectural profession, he was also a keen painter. He died suddenly of a heart attack on 23 August 1928.

== Gallery ==
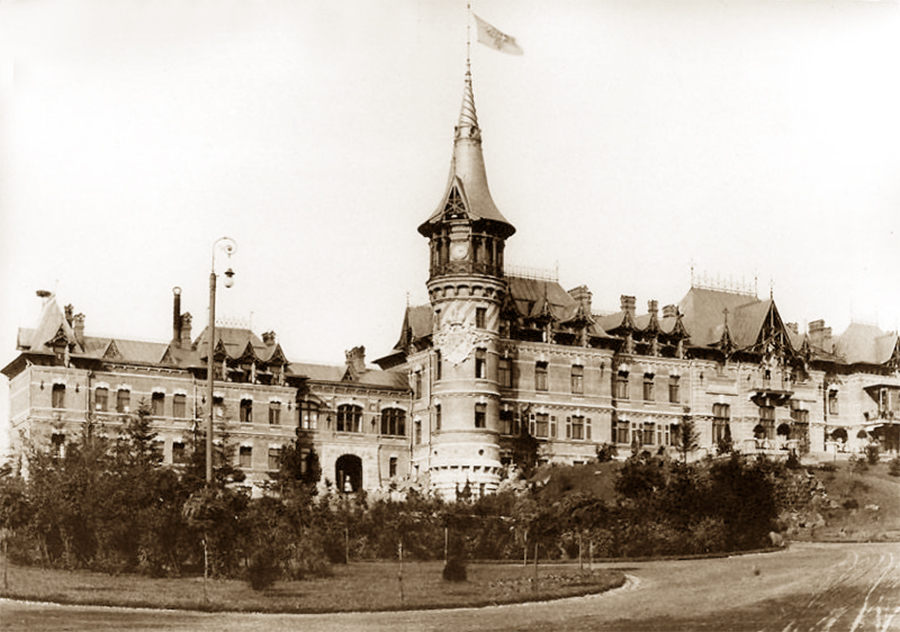
Imperial Palace in Białowieża (1894)

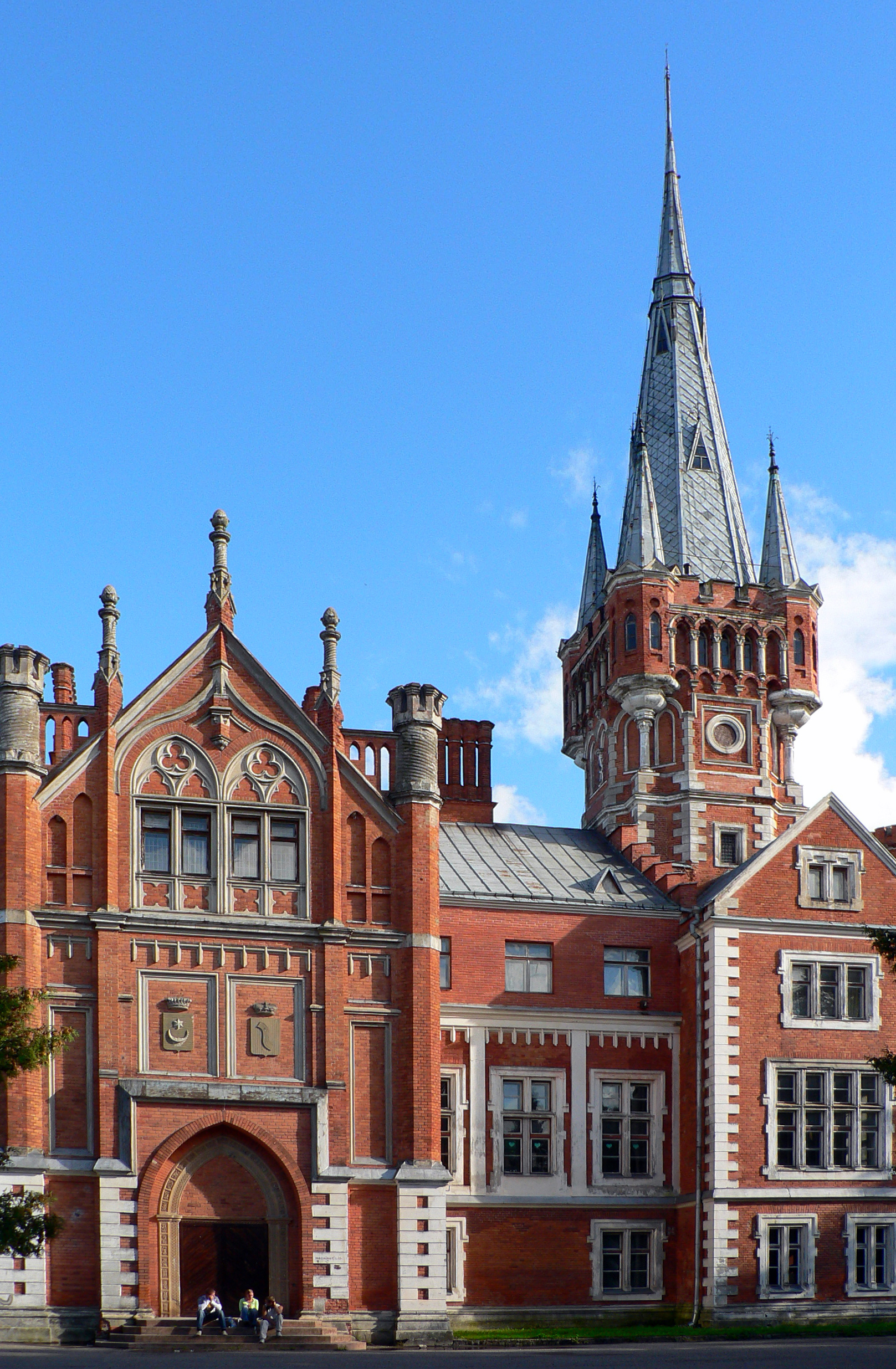
Palace in Lentvaris

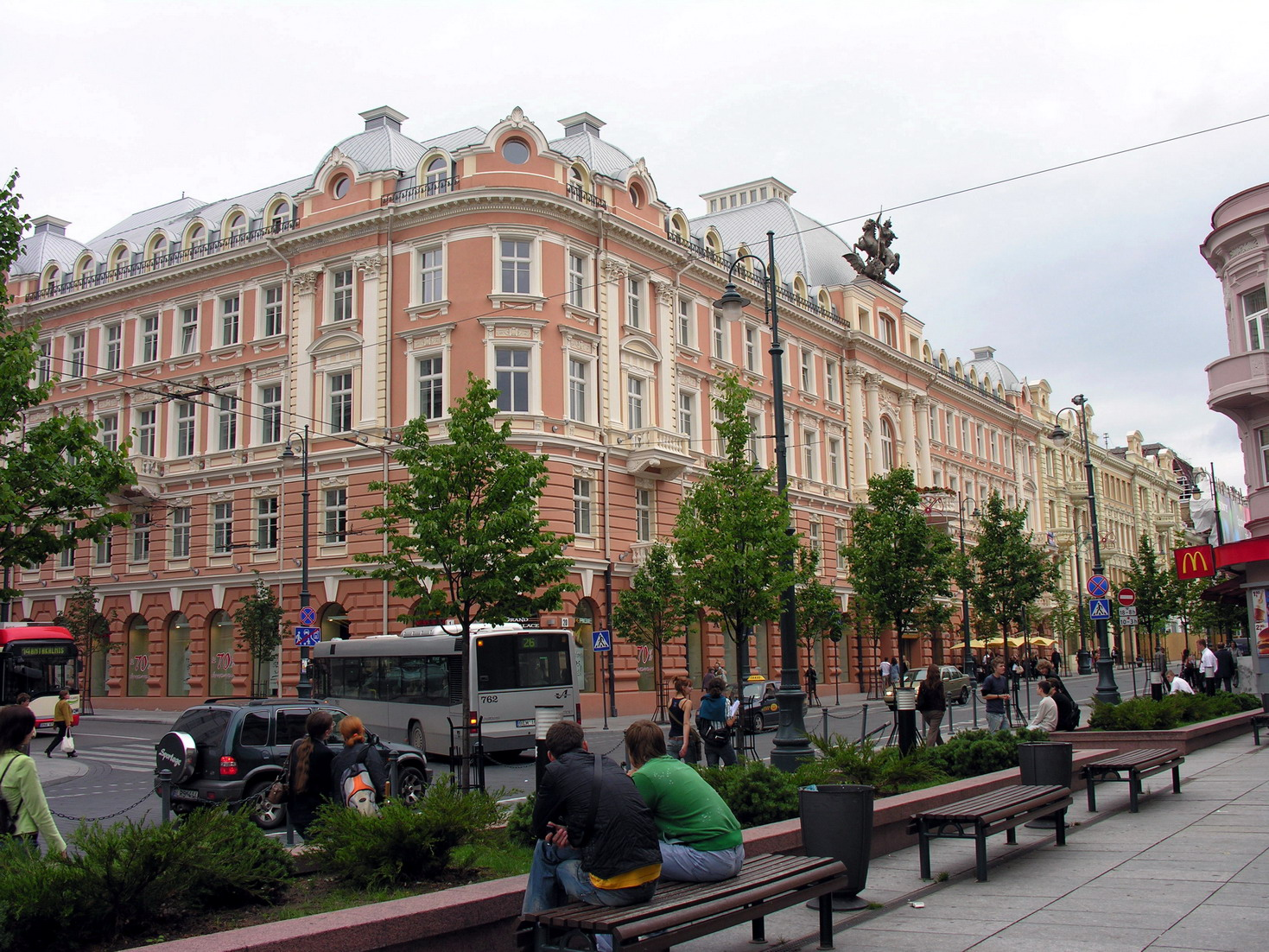
Hotel Georges in Vilnius

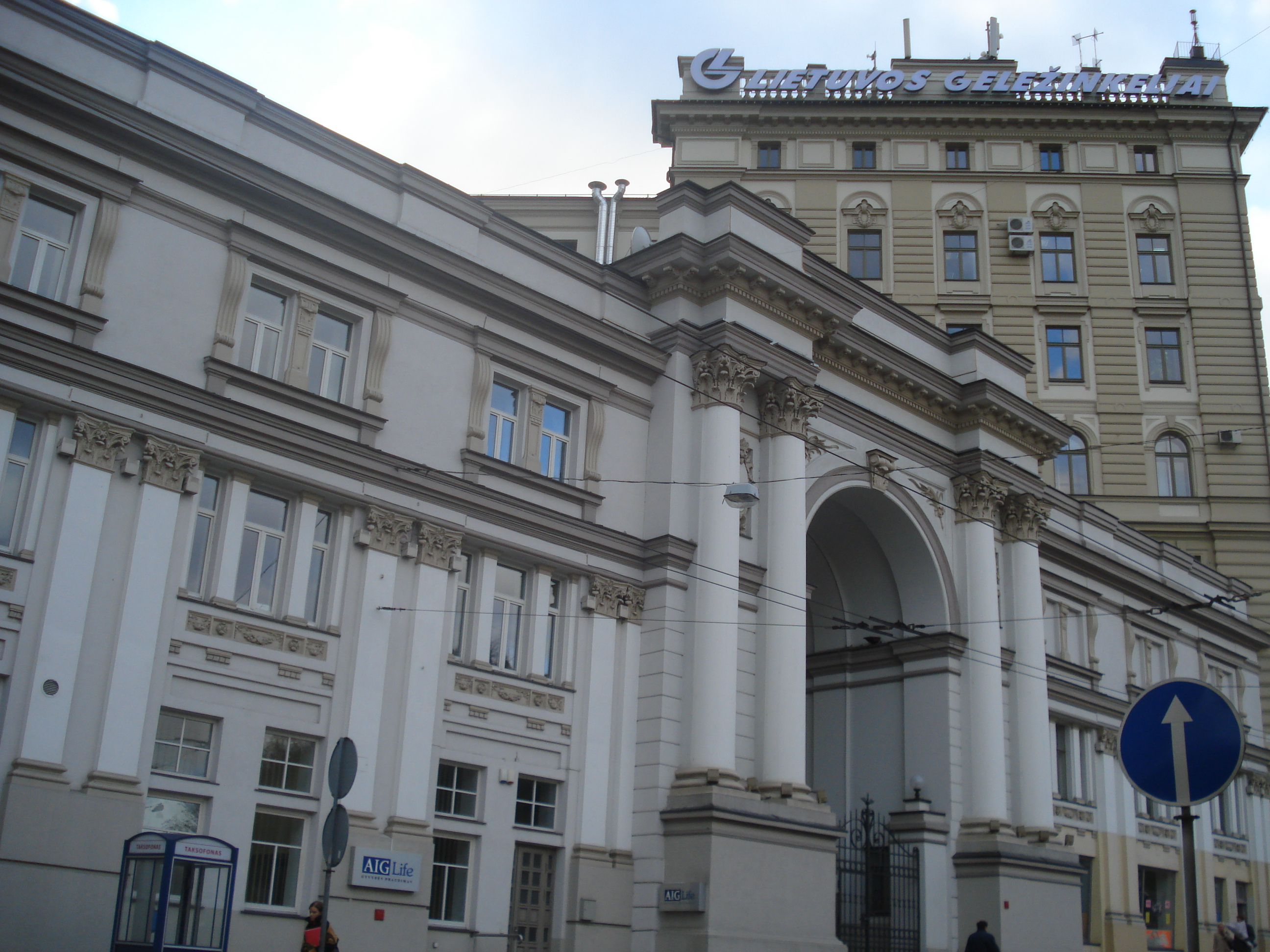
Headquarters of Lithuanian Railways in Vilnius
