= María Rostworowski =

Peruvian historian

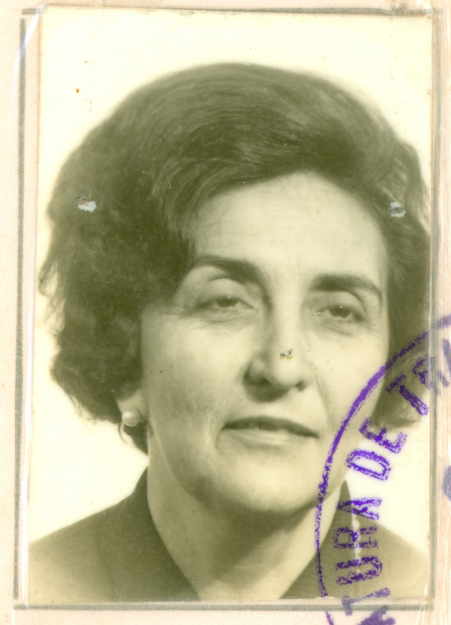
- Born: María Rostworowski Tovar; 8 August 1915; Barranco, Lima, Peru
- Died: 6 March 2016 (aged 100); Lima, Peru
- Other name: María Rostworowski Tovar de Diez Canseco
- Occupation: Historian
- Spouse(s): Count Zygmunt Broel-Plater (divorced); 1 child Alejandro Diez-Canseco Coronel-Zegarra
- Children: Krystyna Rita Juana María
- Parent(s): Jan Jacek Rostworowski and Rita Tovar del Valle

María Rostworowski Tovar de Diez Canseco (8 August 1915 – 6 March 2016) was a Peruvian historian known for her extensive and detailed publications on Peruvian Ancient Cultures and the Inca Empire.

== Biography ==
Rostworowski was born in the Barranco district of Lima, Peru. Her father was Jan Jacek Rostworowski, a Polish aristocrat, and her mother, Rita Tovar del Valle, was from Puno. Her grandfather, Agustín Tovar Aguilar, was president of the Senate and her uncle, Karol Hubert Rostworowski, was a playwright. She studied at various boarding schools in Poland, Belgium, France and England, where she learned French, English, and Polish. She was a student of the Peruvian historian Raúl Porras Barrenechea at the National University of San Marcos. She participated in the Popular Action political party, a Peruvian political party, during the party's inception.

Rostworowski married her distant cousin, Count Zygmunt Broel-Plater, a member of the Polish nobility. His father was Count Edward Cezar Marian Broel-Plater and his mother was Countess Janina Tyszkiewicz-Łohojska. Rostworowski and Count Broel-Plater had one daughter, Cristina Broel-Plater Rostworowski, but later the couple divorced. She later remarried the businessman Alejandro Diez-Canseco Coronel-Zegarra, who was the son of Manuel Diez-Canseco, and relative of the Counts of Alastaya. Diez-Canseco, who would later become the General Departmental Secretary of the Popular Action political party, played a great role in fostering Rostworowski's historical interests. After the sudden death of her husband in March 1961, she moved to the leper colony of San Pablo, directed by the German Maxime Kuczynski, to work as a missionary. It took her one day to navigate through the Amazon River to arrive in the leper colony. The first government of Fernando Belaúnde Terry designated her as cultural assistant in the Peruvian embassy in Spain.

Rostworowski was a student of the Universidad Nacional Mayor de San Marcos. At the university, two of her teachers were Raúl Porras Barrenechea, who introduced her to historiographical proceedings and to the analysis of historical sources, and the North American anthropologist John Murra, who motivated her to begin studying ethnic history. She also had contact with other professors, such as Julio C. Tello, Luis Valcárcel, and Luis Jaime Cisneros during her time at the university. Associated with the Institute of Peruvian Studies from its beginning, María Rostworowski edited numerous publications under the Institute's auspices. One of the publications that she edited is called Historia del Tahuantinsuyo, the highest-selling social science journal in all of Peruvian history.

Rostworowski's contributions to historiography, especially Peruvian history, are numerous. In her first book, Pachacútec inca Yupanqui (1953), she highlights the importance of the Inca government to the construction of the Tahuantinsuyo. She also made important and acclaimed investigations into the field of precolumbian societies on the Peruvian coast, a topic which had not been widely studied until then. Other works of hers come from diverse historical topics, ranging from historical gender studies (La mujer en la época prehispánica, 1986) to precolumbian cults and their eventual Christianization (Pachacamac y el Señor de los Milagros: una trayectoria milenaria, 1992).

In 1979 she became a member of the National Academy of History (Academia Nacional de Historia), and she later became the vice president. Additionally, she was a member of the Royal Spanish Academy of History (Real Academia de la Historia) and the National Argentine Academy of History (Academia Nacional de la Historia). She belonged to the Raúl Porras Barrenechea Institute in Lima and to the Institute of Andean Studies in Berkeley, California. The Geographical Society of Lima accepted her as an honorary member. She presided over the Peruvian Association of Ethnic History (Asociación Peruana de Etnohistoria), which was founded in Lima in 1979 by Fernando Silva Santisteban. In order to continue her research projects, she received the support of the Wenner-Gren foundation, Ford, the Guggenheim foundation, Volkswagen, Fomciencias, and Concytec.

She was also the director of the National History Museum (Museo Nacional de Historia) from 1975 to 1980. In 1969, she worked for the newspaper Correo, which at that time was directed by Roberto Ramírez del Villar. From 1973 to 1974, she worked as a researcher in the Peruvian Culture Museum (Museo de la Cultura Peruana). In 1983, she wrote what she considered her most important work: Estructuras andinas del poder: ideología religiosa y política.

Rostworowski served as vice-president of The National Academy of History (Academia Nacional de Historia), as director of National Museum of History from 1975 to 1980, and was a principal resident scholar at the Institute of Peruvian Studies (IEP) in Lima. She turned 100 in August 2015.

== Death ==
María Rostworowski died on Sunday 6 March 2016, aged 100, between 3:30 and 3:38 in the afternoon.

== Books ==
- Pachacutec inca Yupanqui (1953)
- Curacas y sucesiones: costa norte (1961)
- Los ascendientes de Pumacahua (1963)
- Etnia y sociedad: costa peruana prehispánica (1977 y 1989)
- Señoríos indígenas de Lima y Canta (1978)
- Recursos naturales renovables y pesca: siglos XVI y XVII (1981)
- Estructuras andinas del poder: ideología religiosa y política (1983)
- La mujer en la época prehispánica (1986)
- Entre el mito y la historia: psicoanálisis y pasado andino, con Max Hernández, Moisés Lemlij, Luis Millones y Alberto Péndola (1987)
- Conflicts over Coca Fields in XVI century Perú (1988)
- Historia del Tahuantinsuyu (first edition: 1988)...[ 2001].
- Doña Francisca Pizarro: una ilustre mestiza (1534–1598) (1989)
- Pachacámac y el Señor de los Milagros: una trayectoria milenaria (1992)
- Las visitas a Cajamarca. 1571-72/1578.
- Documentos (1992, 2 volumes, with Pilar Remy)
- Ensayos de historia andina (1993 y 1998)
- La mujer en el Perú prehispánico (1995)
- Kon, el dios volador y el pequeño Naycashca, with illustrations by Claudine Gaime (1995)
- La muerte del sol y otros cuentos del Antiguo Perú (1996)
- El origen de los hombres y otros cuentos del Antiguo Perú (1996)
- María Fernanda Alvarado Ágreda (1996)
- Pachacútec y la leyenda de los chancas (1997)
- El señorío de Pachacámac (1999)
- Historia de los Incas (Lima: Editorial Bruño, 1999)
- Los Incas (Lima: Fundación Telefónica, 2000) (in CD-ROM).
- Incas Enciclopedia temática del Perú. El Comercio edition, Lima (2004) ISBN 9972-752-00-3 of the collection; ISBN 9972-752-01-1 of the book; 120 thousand copies
- Obras completas (2005)

== See also ==
- List of centenarians (educators, school administrators, social scientists and linguists)
- List of Poles
- List of Peruvians
