= Rybna, Lesser Poland Voivodeship =

Rybna
- Village
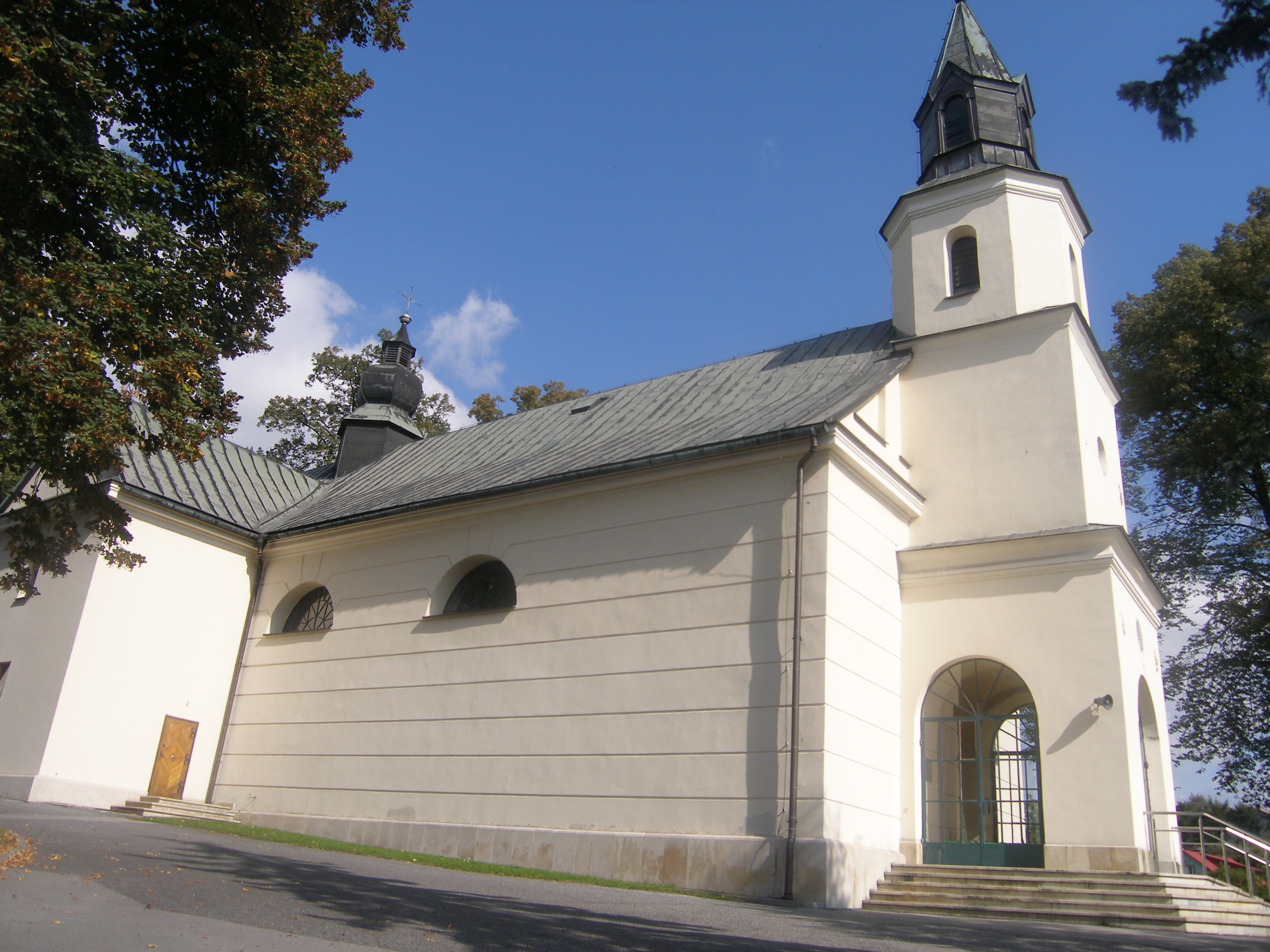
- Saint Casimir Church

- Location within Poland
- Coordinates: 50°3′4″N 19°38′50″E
- Country: Poland
- Voivodeship: Lesser Poland
- County: Kraków
- Gmina: Czernichów
- Population (approx.): 3,300
- Website: http://www.rybna.malopolska.pl/

Rybna [ˈrɨbna] is a village in the administrative district of Gmina Czernichów, within Kraków County, Lesser Poland Voivodeship, in southern Poland.

The village has an approximate population of 3,300.
