= Church of the Savior on Blood =

Cathedral in Saint Petersburg, Russia

The Church of the Savior on Spilled Blood Церковь Спаса на Крови (Russian)
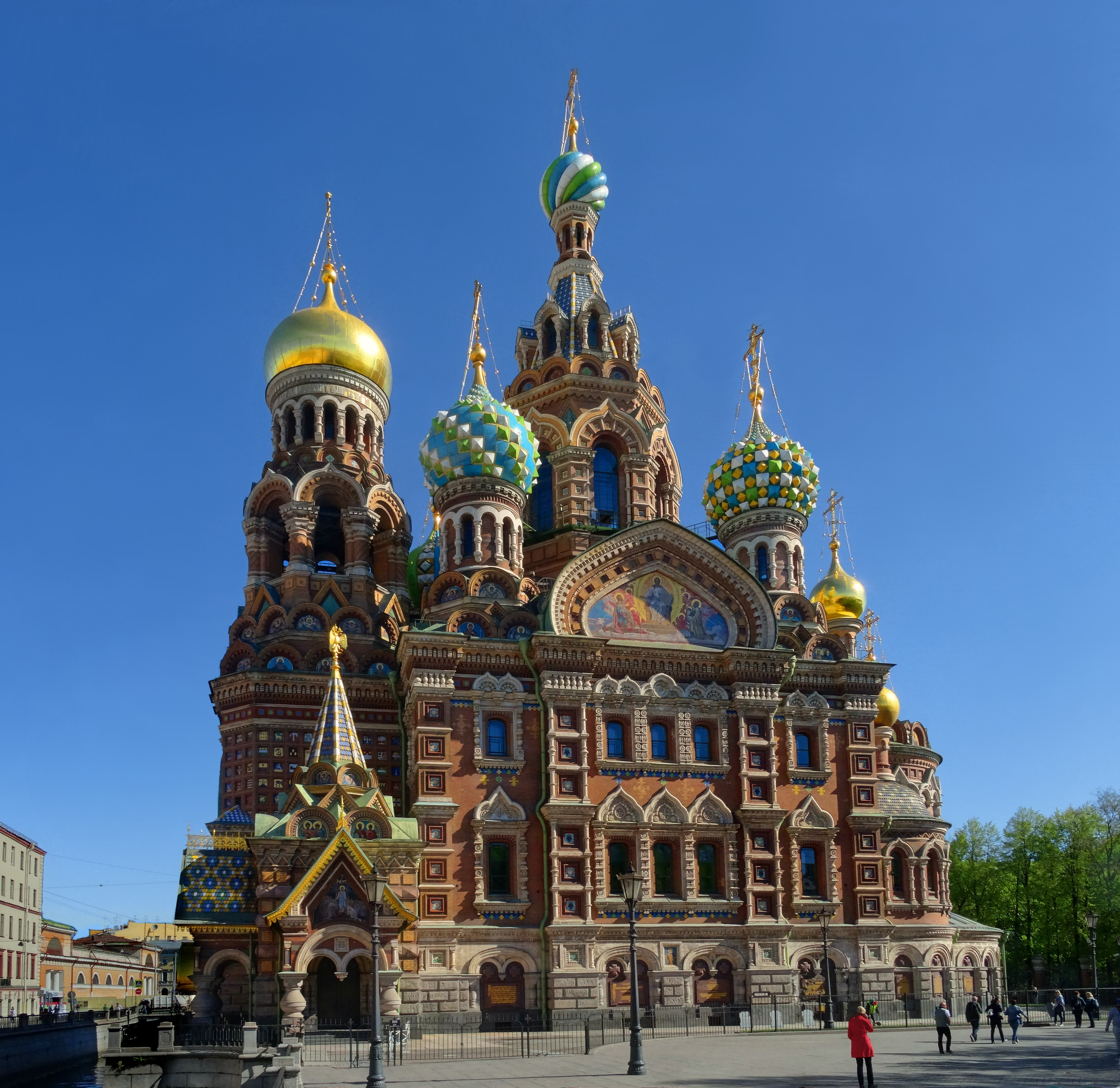

Religion
- Affiliation: Russian Orthodox
- Ecclesiastical or organisational status: State Historical Museum
- Status: Secularized (1930s)

Location
- Location: Saint Petersburg, Russia
- Interactive map of The Church of the Savior on Spilled Blood; Церковь Спаса на Крови (Russian)
- Coordinates: 59°56′24″N 30°19′43″E

Architecture
- Architects: Alfred Alexandrovich Parland, Archimandrite Ignaty (Ivan Malyshev)
- Type: Church
- Style: Russian Revival architecture
- Groundbreaking: 1883
- Completed: 1907

Website
- Savior on the Spilled Blood

The Church of the Savior on Spilled Blood (Russian: Церковь Спаса на Крови, Tserkovʹ Spasa na Krovi) (Note: Other names include the Church on Spilled Blood (Russian: Церковь на Крови, Tserkov’ na Krovi), the Temple of the Savior on Spilled Blood (Russian: Храм Спаса на Крови, Khram Spasa na Krovi), and the Cathedral of the Resurrection of Christ (Russian: Собор Воскресения Христова, Sobor Voskreseniya Khristova.)) is a Russian Orthodox church in Saint Petersburg, Russia which currently functions as a secular museum and church at the same time. The structure was constructed between 1883 and 1907. It is one of Saint Petersburg's major attractions.

The church was erected on the site where Narodnaya Volya members assassinated Emperor Alexander II in March 1881. The church was funded by the Romanov imperial family in honor of Alexander II, and the suffix "on [Spilled] Blood" refers to his assassination.

== History ==
Construction began in 1883 during the reign of Alexander III, two years after the assassination of his father Alexander II. The church was consecrated as a memorial to his father. Estimates suggest that the construction cost 4.5 million rubles. The construction was completed during the reign of Nicholas II in 1907. Funding was provided by the Imperial family with the support of many private donors.

The church is prominently situated along the Griboedov Canal; paved roads run along both sides of the canal. On March 13, 1881 (Julian date: March 1), as Alexander II's carriage passed along the embankment, a grenade thrown by an anarchist conspirator exploded. The tsar, shaken but unhurt, got out of the carriage and started to remonstrate with the presumed culprit. A second conspirator took the chance to throw another bomb, killing himself and mortally wounding the tsar. The tsar, bleeding heavily, was taken back to the Winter Palace, where he died a few hours later.

A temporary shrine was erected on the site of the attack while plans and fundraising for a more permanent memorial were undertaken. In order to build a permanent shrine on the exact spot where the assassination took place, it was decided to narrow the canal so that the section of road on which the tsar had been driving could be included within the walls of the church. An elaborate shrine, in the form of a ciborium, was constructed at the end of the church opposite the altar, on the exact place of Alexander's assassination. It is embellished with topaz, lazurite and other semi-precious stones, making a striking contrast with the simple cobblestones of the old road, which are exposed in the floor of the shrine.

== Architecture ==
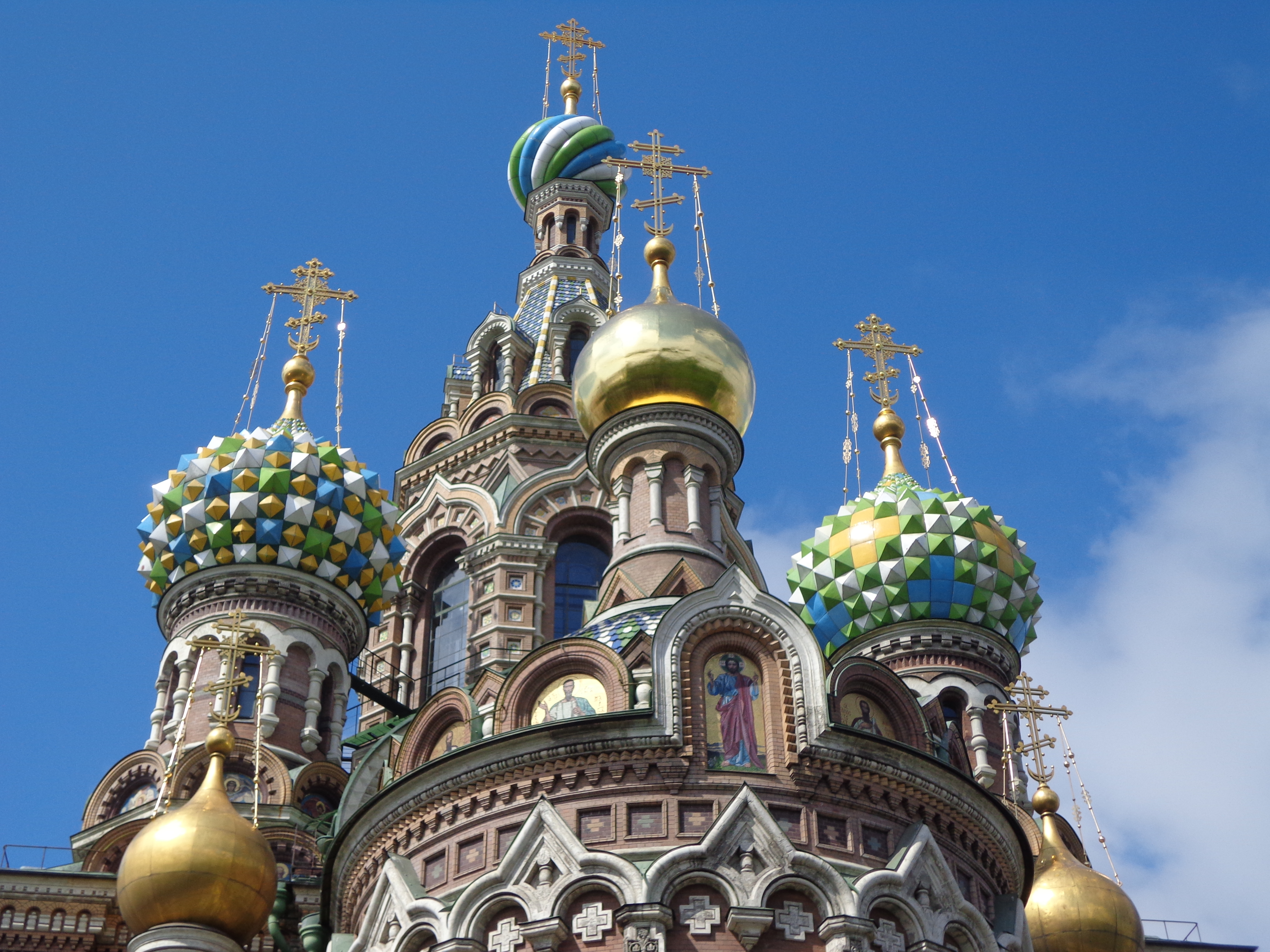
Detail of the richly decorated onion domes

Architecturally, the cathedral differs from Saint Petersburg's other structures. The city's architecture is predominantly Baroque and Neoclassical, but the Savior on Blood harks back to medieval Russian architecture in the spirit of romantic nationalism. It intentionally resembles the 17th-century Yaroslavl churches and the celebrated St. Basil's Cathedral in Moscow.

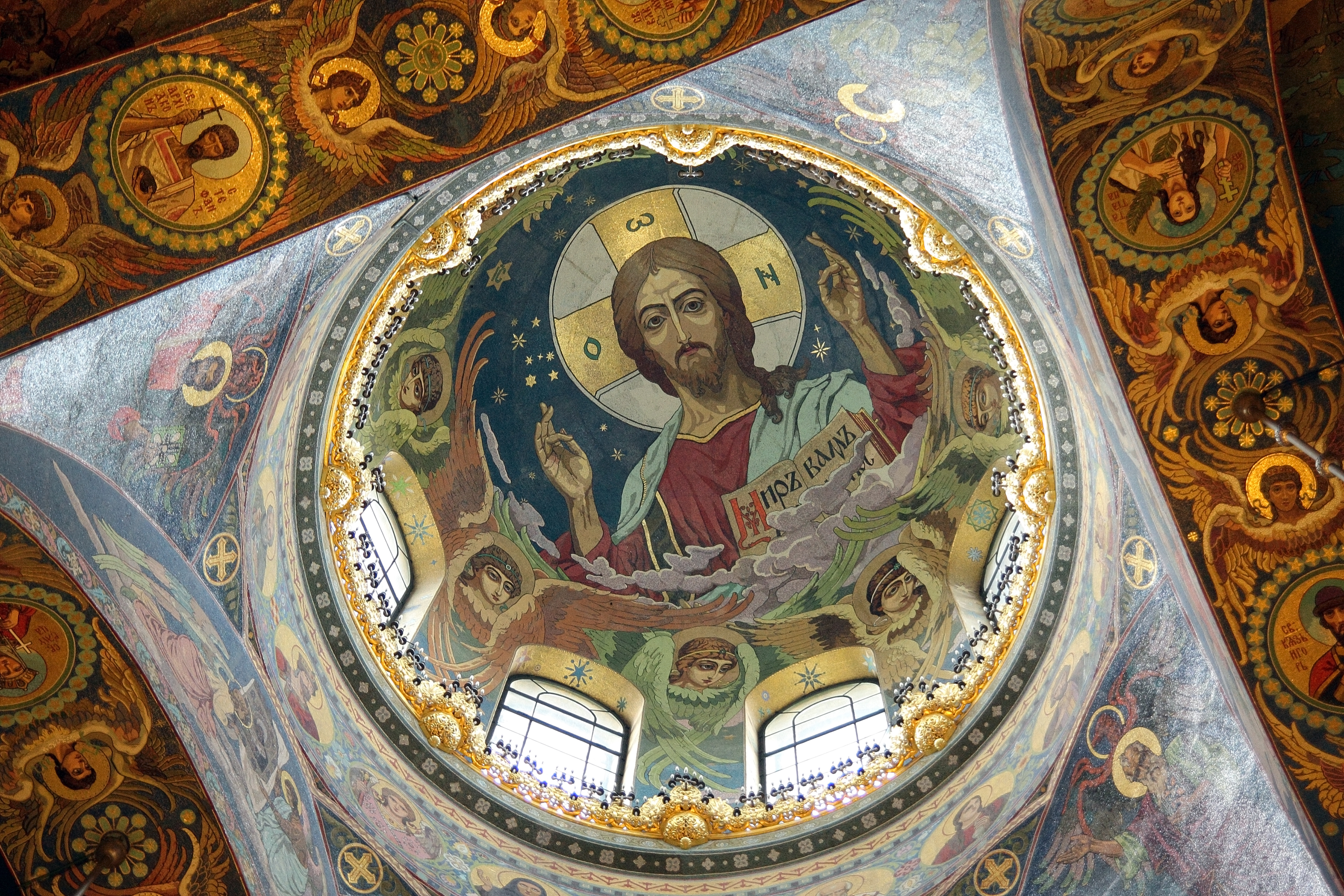
Mosaic of Christ Pantocrator under the central dome

The church contains over 7065 square meters of mosaics. It may be the 2nd largest collection of mosaics in the world, after the Cathedral Basilica of St. Louis, which houses 7700 square meters of mosaics. The interior was designed by some of the most celebrated Russian artists of the day—including Viktor Vasnetsov, Mikhail Nesterov and Mikhail Vrubel – but the church's chief architect, Alfred Alexandrovich Parland, was relatively little-known (born in Saint Petersburg in 1842 in a Baltic-German Lutheran family). Perhaps not surprisingly, the church's construction ran well over budget, having been estimated at 3.6 million rubles but ending up costing over 4.6 million. The walls and ceilings inside the church are completely covered in intricately detailed mosaics – the main pictures being biblical scenes or figures – but with very fine patterned borders setting off each picture.

== Russian Revolution of 1917 ==
In the aftermath of the Russian Revolution, the church was ransacked and looted, badly damaging its interior. The Soviet government closed the church in 1932. During the Second World War when many people were starving due to the Siege of Leningrad by Nazi German military forces, the church was used as a temporary morgue for those who died in combat and from starvation and illness. The church suffered significant damage. After the war, it was used as a warehouse for vegetables, leading to the sardonic name of Saviour on Potatoes.

== Modern usage ==
In July 1970, management of the church passed to Saint Isaac's Cathedral and it was used as a museum. The proceeds from the Cathedral funded the restoration of the church. It was reopened in August 1997, after 27 years of restoration, but has not been reconsecrated and does not function as a full-time place of worship. The Church of the Saviour on Blood is a museum of mosaics. In the pre-Revolution period it was not used as a public place of worship. The church was dedicated to the memory of the assassinated tsar and only panikhidas (memorial services) took place. The church is now one of the main tourist attractions in Saint Petersburg.

== Holy Gates ==
In 2005, the State Museum of St. Isaac's Cathedral began the recreation of the Holy Gates (permanently lost in the 1920s during the Soviet period). Entirely produced with enamels and based on the pictures and lithographies of the time, the new Holy Gates were designed by V. J. Nikolsky and S. G. Kochetova and reified by the famous enamel artist L. Solomnikova and her atelier. Orthodox bishop Amvrosij of Gatchina celebrated the consecration of these new Holy Gates on 14 March 2012, the 129th anniversary of Alexander II's assassination.

== In popular culture ==
- The church appears on the cover of the 2011 contemporary classical album Troika.
- The church is featured in the alternate history comic DC Comics Bombshells, as the location of the facility where Hugo Strange creates Power Girl on behalf of the Soviet government during the Siege of Leningrad.
- The church was visited during the seventeenth season of the CBS reality show The Amazing Race and also hosted a Pit Stop during the third season of the Australian variant The Amazing Race Australia.
- The church is seen in the opening sequence of the animated film Anastasia, which begins in Saint Petersburg.

== Gallery ==
The church from the park

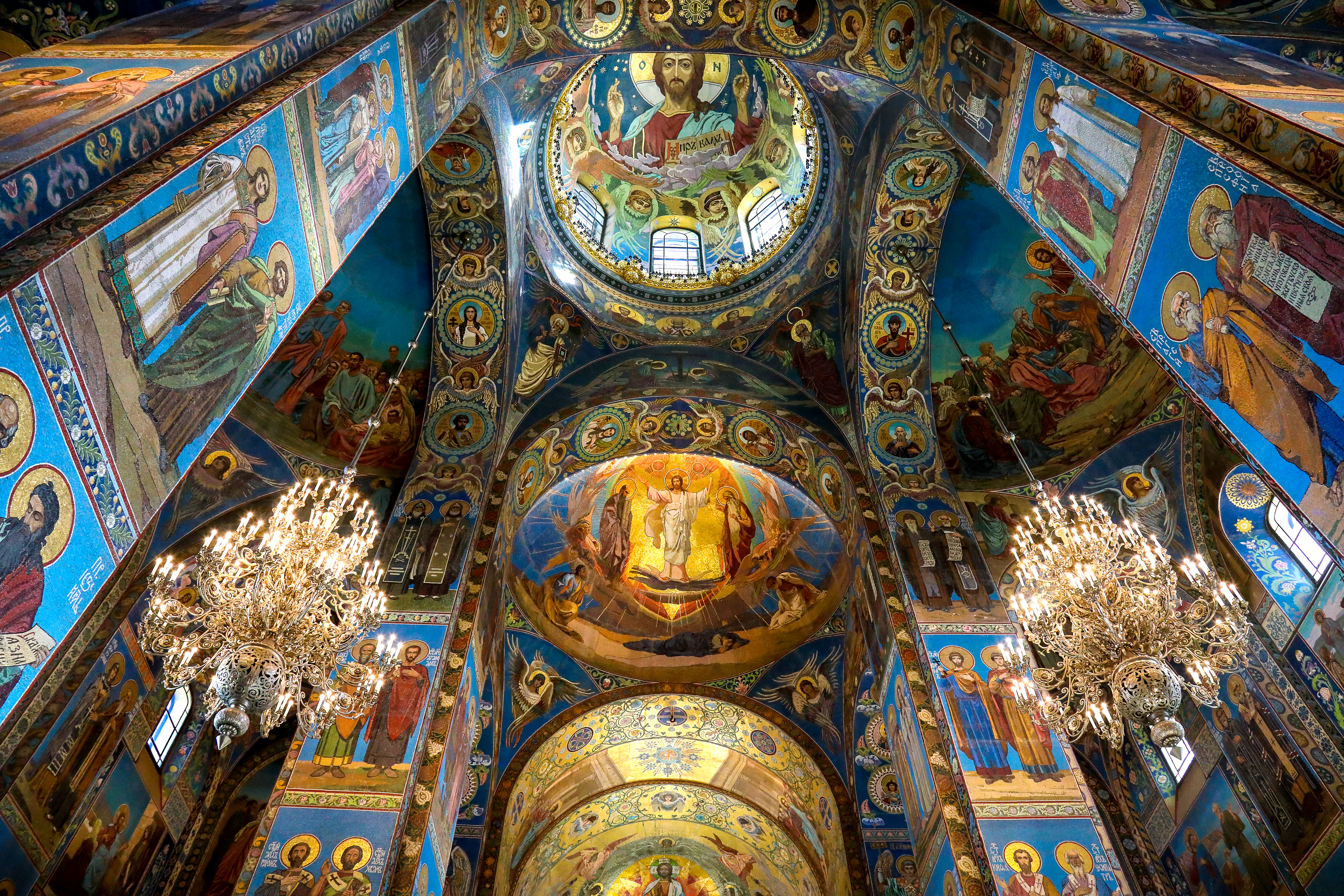
Mosaics in the interior

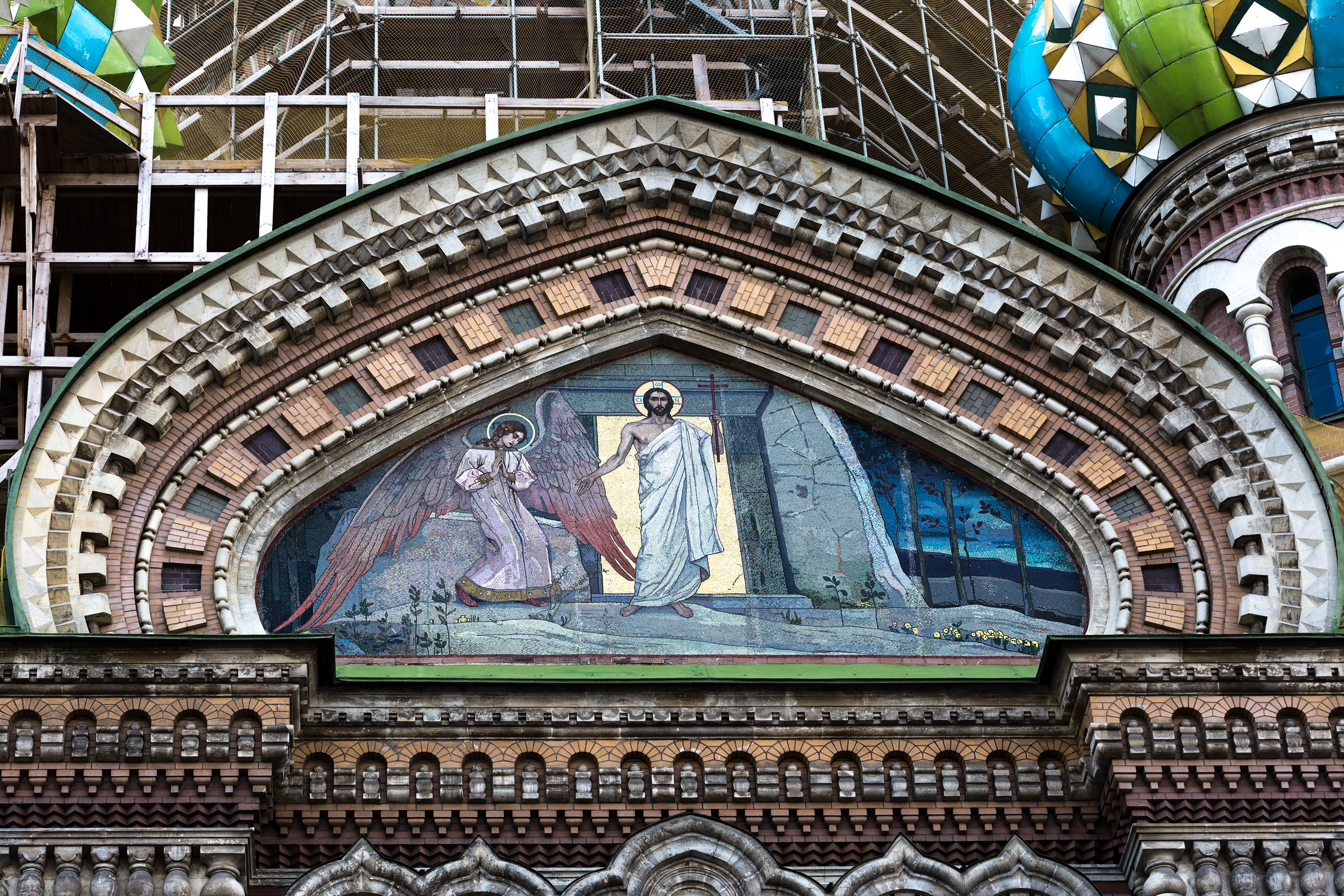
Exterior mosaics

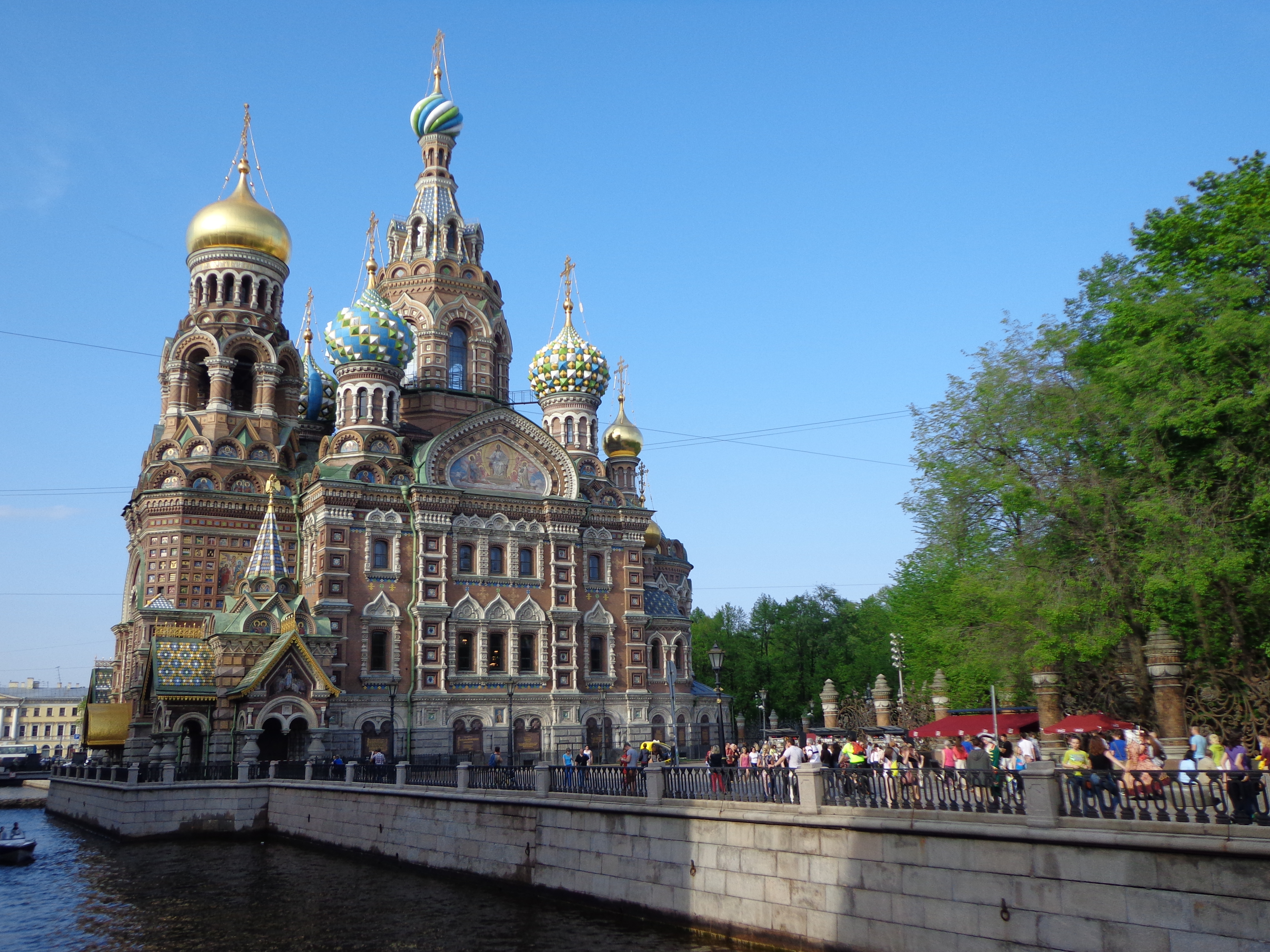
View from Griboedov Canal

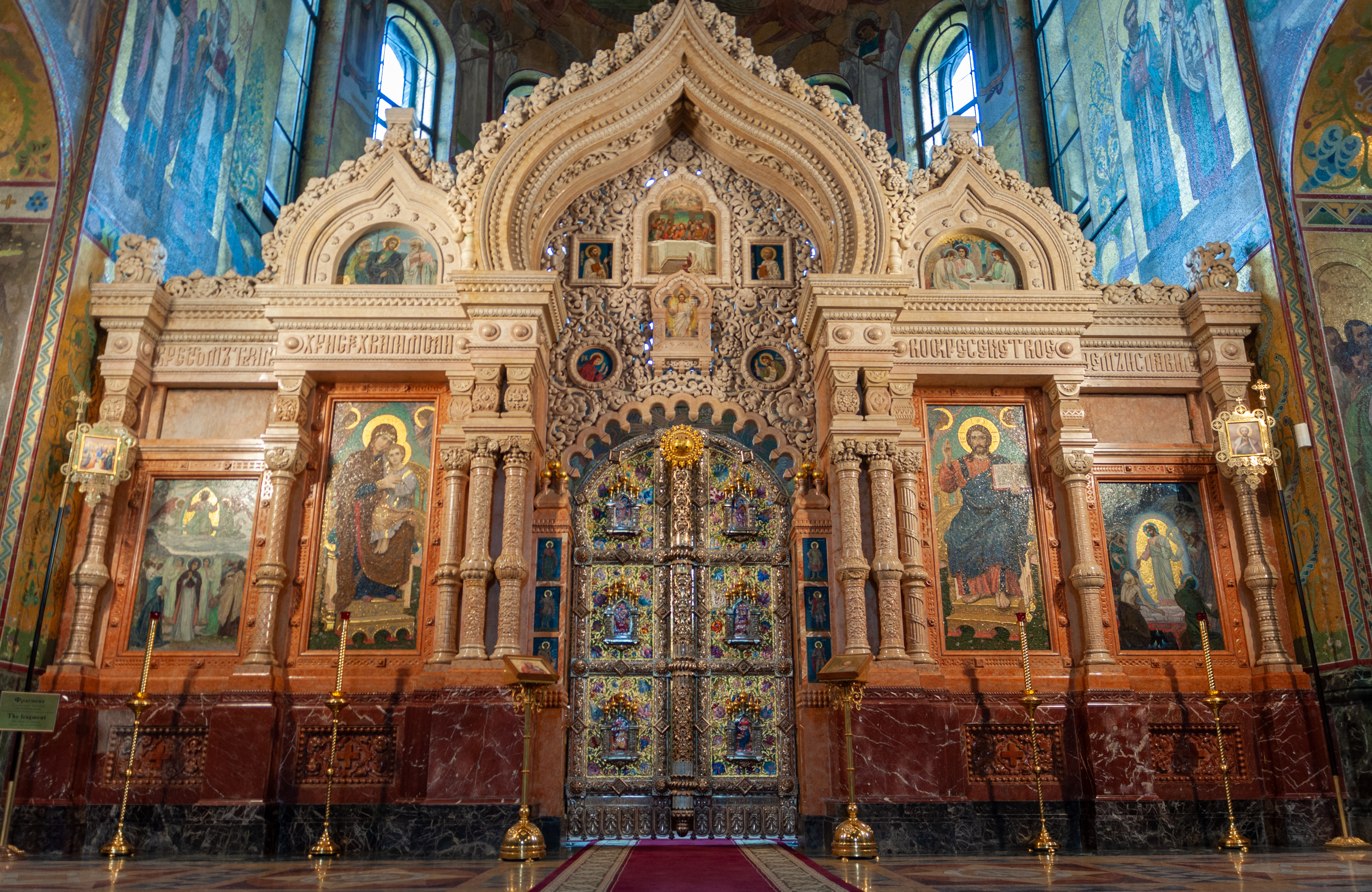
Iconostasis of the church

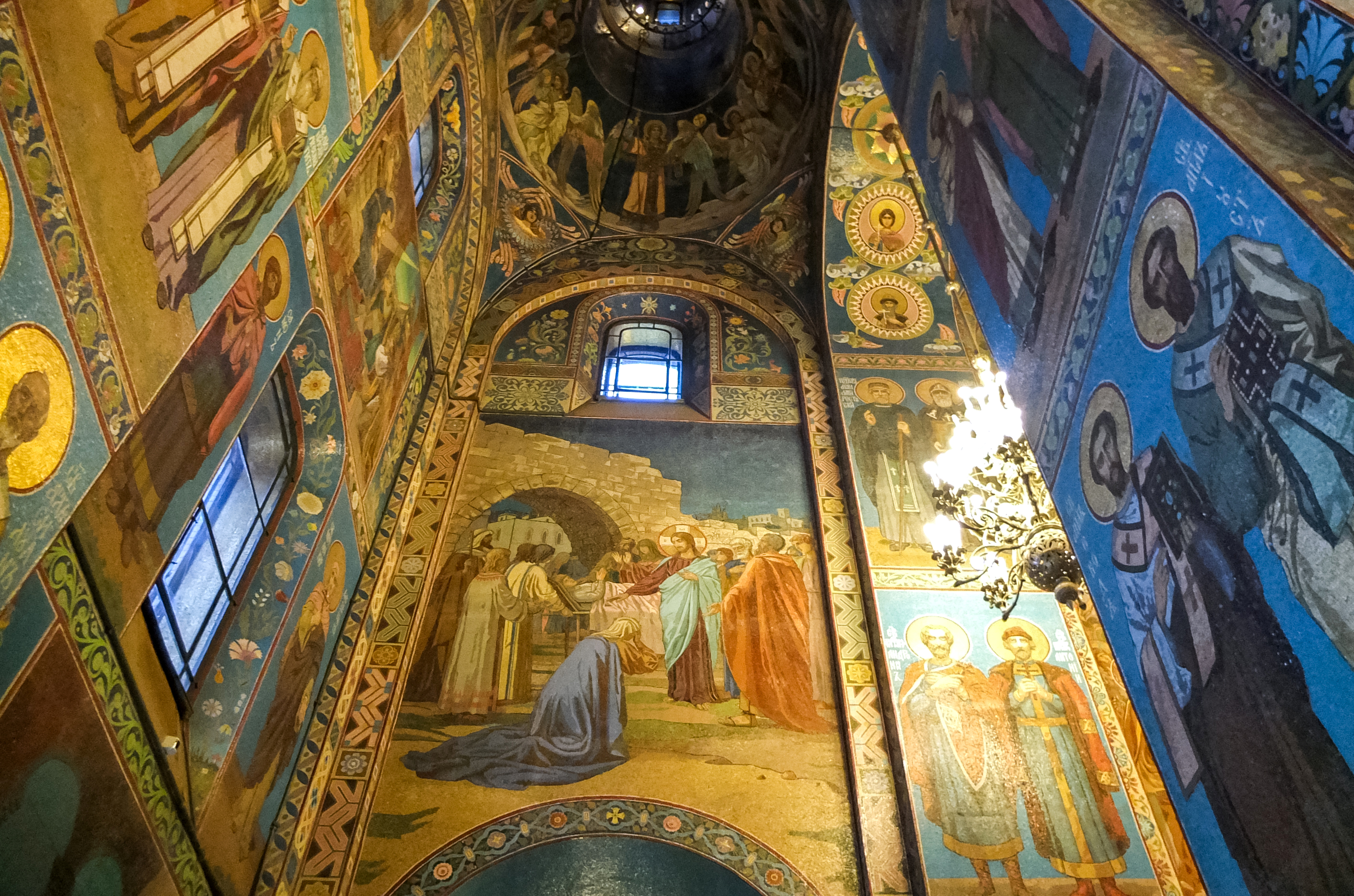
Interior

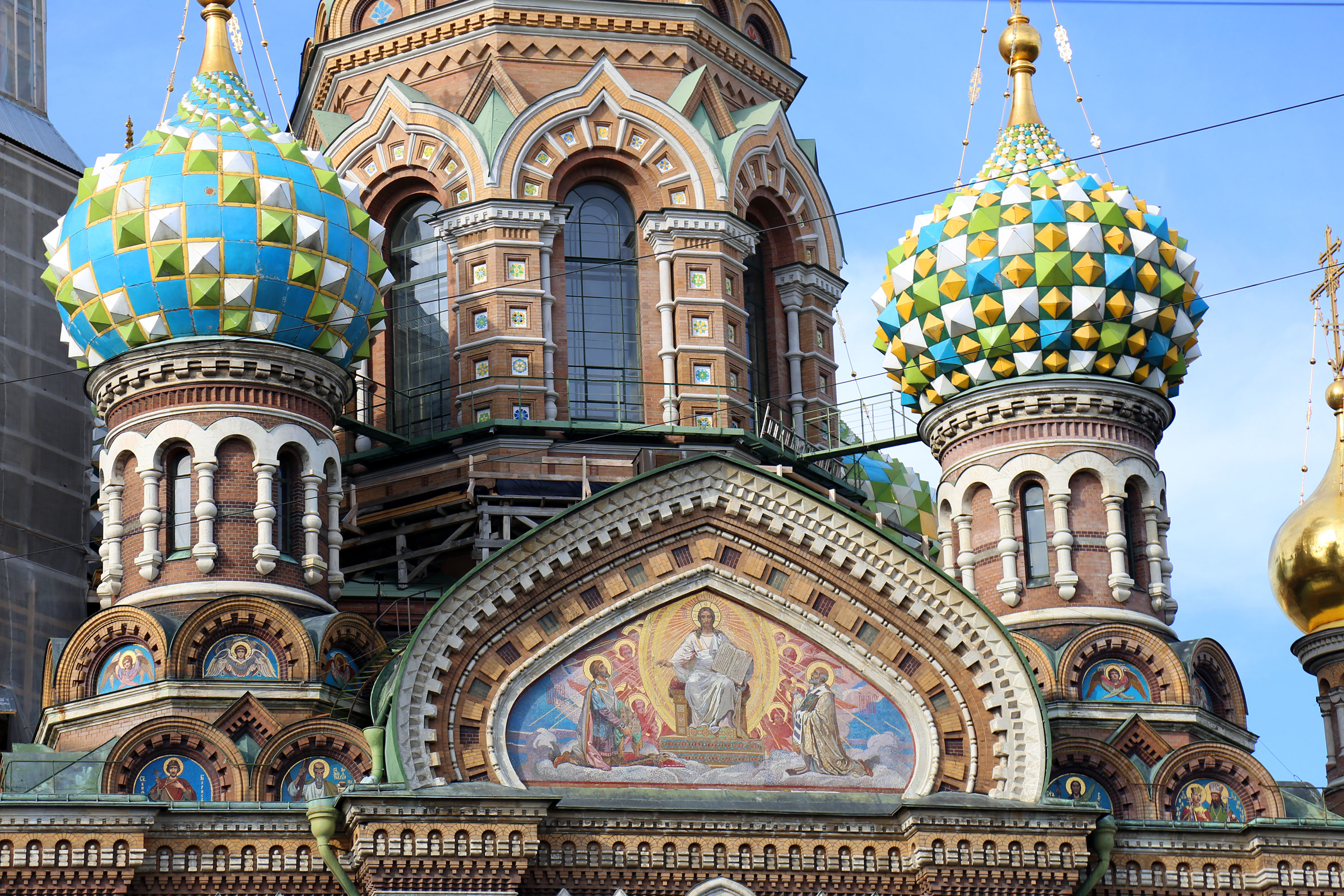
Savior on the Spilled Blood, Saint Peteresburg, Russia
