= Karol Hubert Rostworowski =

Polish playwright, poet and musician

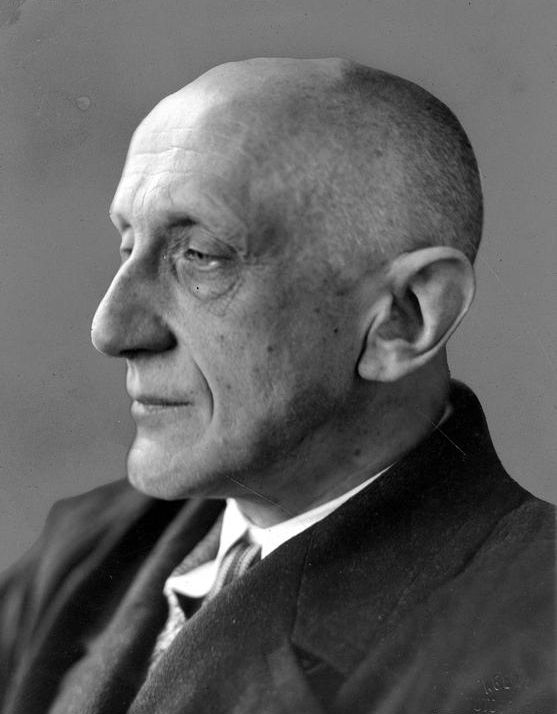
- Born: 3 November 1877; Rybna
- Died: 4 February 1938 (aged 60); Kraków
- Writing career
- Notable works: Niespodzianka (Surprise); Judasz z Kariothu

Karol Hubert Rostworowski (3 November 1877 – 4 February 1938) was a Polish playwright, poet and musician, born to a family of local gentry. He is remembered for his opposition to totalitarianism and for fatalistic works inspired by Catholic morality.

Rostworowski was born in Rybna in southern Poland. He studied agriculture in Halle, but abandoned it in 1900. He began studying piano and composition at the Leipzig Conservatory in 1901, and moved to Berlin to study philosophy six years later. He returned to Poland in 1908 and settled in Czarkowy on the Nida. During World War I he moved to Kraków and became a member of National Democracy, publishing in Głos Narodu beginning in 1920. In 1933 he was chosen to join the Polish Academy of Literature, but resigned his membership in 1937 in protest against the change of government. Between 1934 and 1937 he had served as a councillor in the Kraków municipal government on the platform of the National Party. He died in Kraków.

== Artistic career ==
Rostworowski had his first published work, a collection of decadent poems called Tandeta, released in 1901 (or 1911, sources vary). In 1907–1909 he published a four-volume series: Pre memoria, Maya, Ante lucis ortum, and Saeculum solutum. He published his first dramas between 1908 and 1911, including Żeglarze (Sailors, 1908), Pod górę (Uphill, 1910), and Echo (1911). He became famous locally for his play Judasz z Kariothu (Judas of Kerioth, 1913), based on the New Testament and staged with the actor Ludwik Solski in the title role. His next widely discussed historical play, about the nature of tyranny, was Kajus Cezar Kaligula (1917), also with Solski. In 1920 he published Miłosierdzie (Mercy), and in 1922 the drama Straszne dzieci (Hollow Children), followed by Zmartwychwstanie (Resurrection, 1923) and Antychryst (1925), but these were not as highly regarded as his first plays. He spoke out against totalitarianism in Czerwony marsz (Red March, 1930), a morality play on guillotines and rolling heads based on the French Revolution and the Terror.

=== Niespodzianka ===
Rostworowski received rave reviews for his tragedy Niespodzianka (Surprise, 1928–1929), about parents murdering for money their own son, who had emigrated to America and returned to visit them. The work was staged at the Juliusz Słowacki Theatre in 1929, and in 1932 won the national book prize. Niespodzianka was regarded as Rostworowski's most notable achievement by the Polish Nobel laureate Czesław Miłosz. The novel tells an old story, first recorded around the 17th century. A peasant family in financial despair is visited by a well-dressed man asking for lodgings. They kill him in his sleep to steal his belongings, but subsequently discover that he was their own son. Both parents suffer psychologically, and the money is given to their younger son to pay for his education. The story was staged by director Jan Świderski in Poznań in 1987.

Rostworowski died in 1938 in Kraków, and was buried at the Salwator estate cemetery. His strong Catholic ethics and a firm stance against totalitarianism caused his work to be disregarded in communist Poland and nearly forgotten. He was survived by three sons, Jan Rostworowski (poet, 1919–1975), Marek (art historian and minister of culture, 1921–1996) and Emanuel (also an historian, and editor-in-chief of the Polish Biographical Dictionary).
