= Alexey Tarasovich Markov =

Russian painter

- Алексей Тарасович Марков
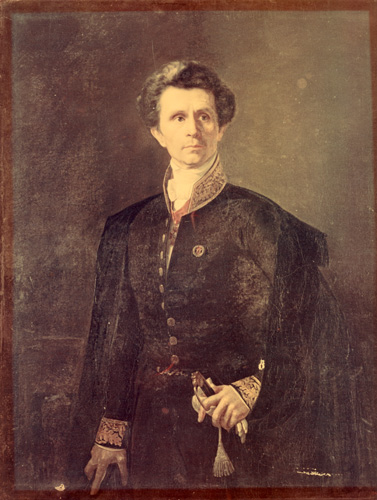
- Portrait by Kirill Gorbunov, 1851, Russian Museum, Saint Petersburg
- Born: March 12, 1802; Veliky Novgorod
- Died: February 28, 1878 (aged 75); Saint Petersburg
- Resting place: Smolensky Cemetery, Saint Petersburg
- Education: Andrey Ivanov; Alexei Egorov; Vasily Shebuyev
- Alma mater: Imperial Academy of Arts (1824)
- Known for: History painting
- Awards: Big Gold Medal of the Imperial Academy of Arts (1830)

Alexey Tarasovich Markov (Russian: Алексей Тарасович Марков, 24 March 1802 – 12 March 1878) was a Russian painter in the Neoclassical style, active in St. Petersburg during Tsars Nicholas I and Alexander II's reigns, best known for his history paintings and church decorations.

== Biography ==
His father was a watchmaker. He studied at the Imperial Academy of Arts under Andrey Ivanovich Ivanov, Alexei Yegorov and Vasily Shebuyev; graduating in 1824, having received several medals. In 1825, he became a "pensioner" of the academy, on condition that he continue to study and improve. He received a gold medal and a stipend for a study trip outside of Russia in 1830, as recognition for his painting "Socrates, Before his Death, Talking with Students About the Immortality of the Soul".

He visited Dresden and Rome, copying frescoes and paintings, notably those of Raphael, as well as producing his own. In 1836, his work "Fortune and the Beggar" brought him the title of Academician. In 1842, for his painting of Christian martyrs in the Colosseum, he was named a Professor (2nd Degree). Ten years later, he was promoted to Professor (1st Degree) and was awarded the title of Distinguished Professor in 1865.

Although he was an excellent craftsman, his chief contribution to Russian art was his diligent teaching. He sought out young artists, who in turn favored his classes when requesting apprenticeships.

In addition to his paintings, he created frescoes and decorative works. One of his most prominent is "Joseph Meeting his Brothers in Egypt", in the attic of Saint Isaac's Cathedral. He also performed the drawings and composition for the depiction of the Trinitarian God on the ceiling of the Cathedral of Christ the Saviour, although the actual work was executed by Ivan Makarov, Ivan Kramskoi, Nikolay Koshelev and Bogdan Wenig.

== Works ==
Alexey Markov's works

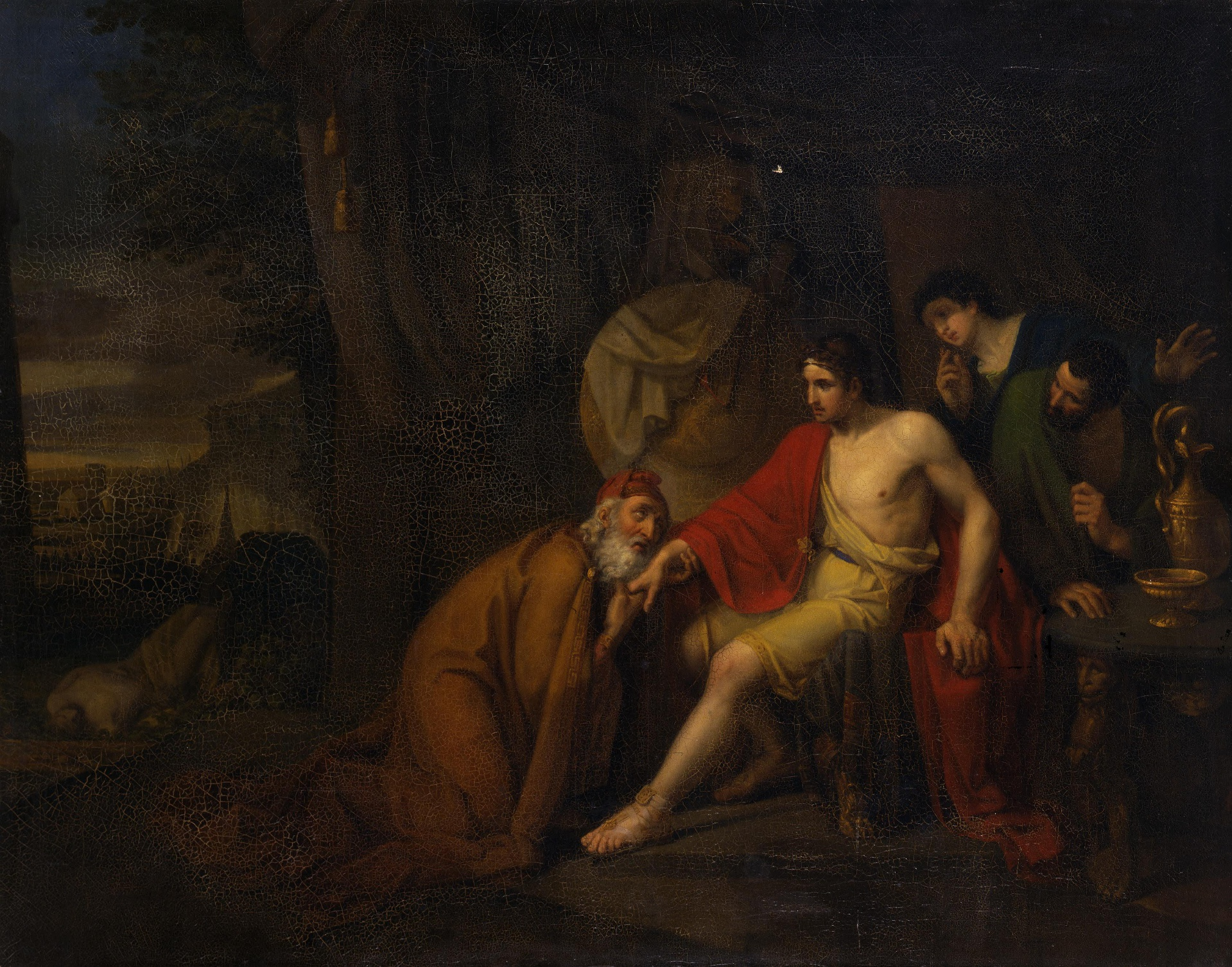
Priam, asking Achilles for the body of Hector (1824)

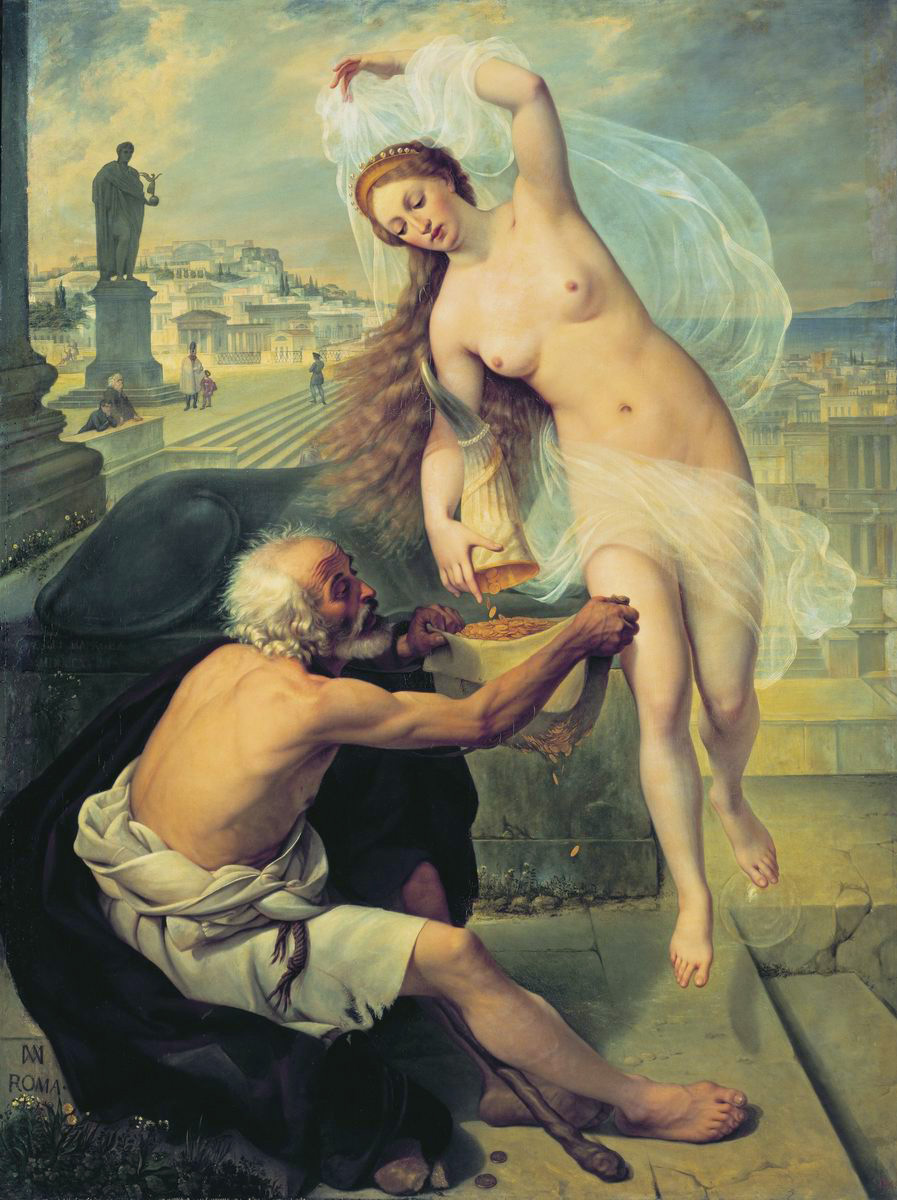
Fortune and the Beggar (1836)

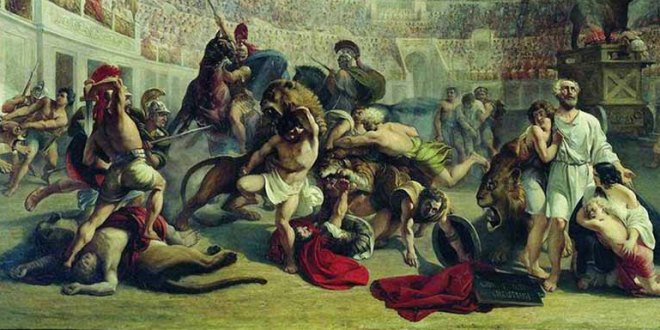
Saint Eustace in the Colosseum (1839)

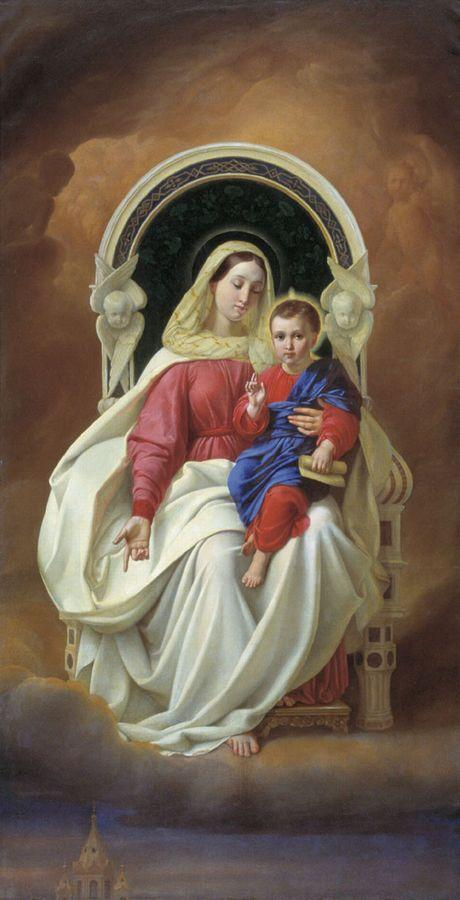
The Virgin and Child (1849)
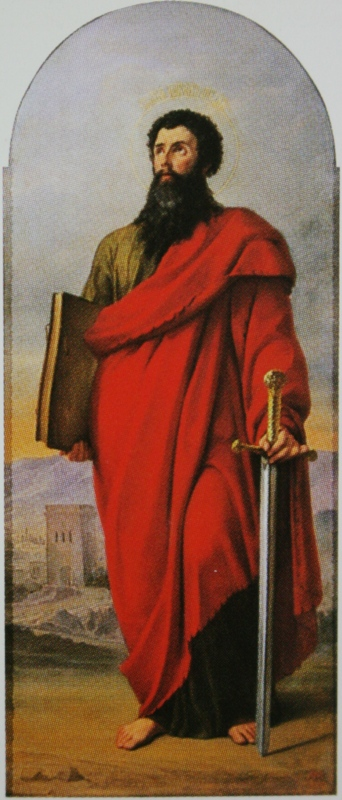
Paul the Apostle (1849)

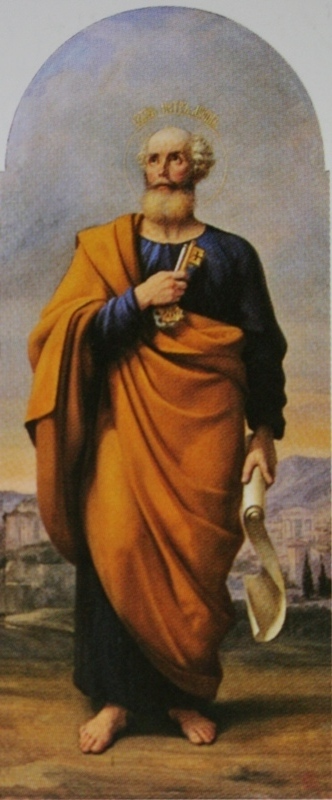
Saint Peter (1849)

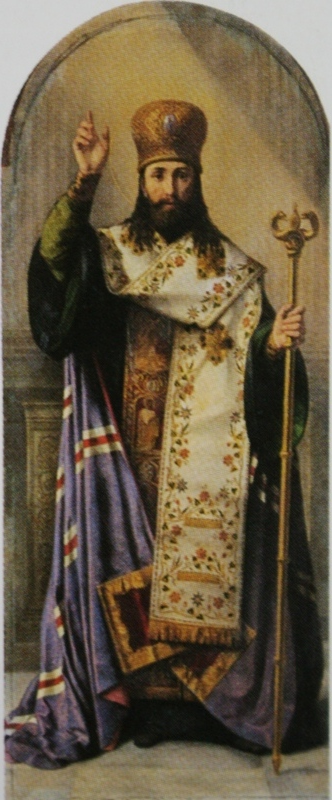
Basil of Caesarea (1849)

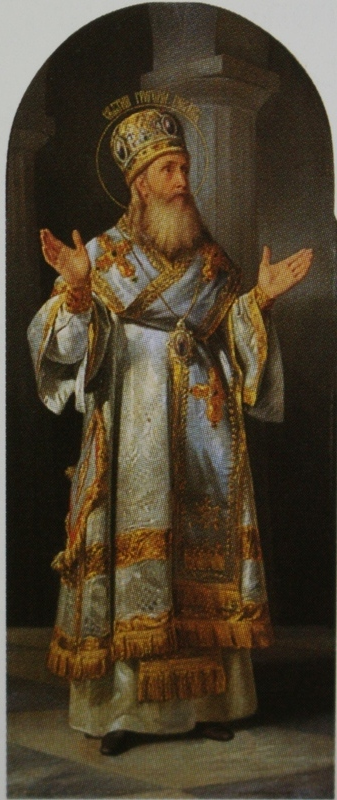
Gregory of Nazianzus (1849)

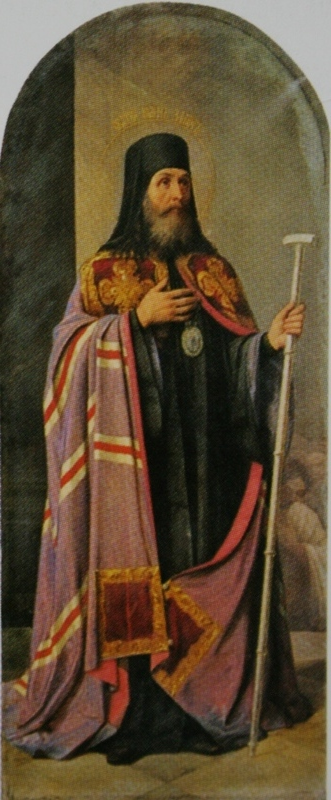
John Chrysostom (1849)

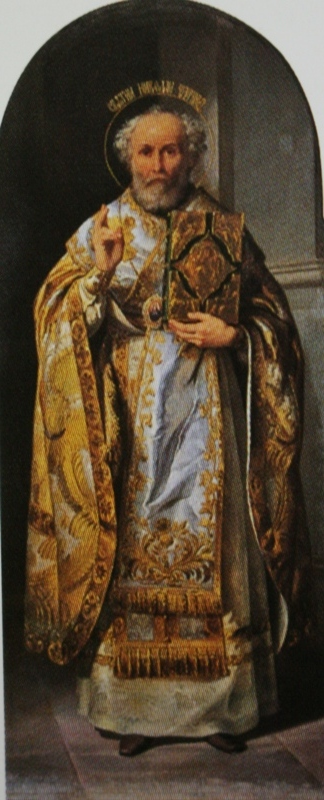
Saint Nicholas (1849)
