= Ivan Tarkhanov =

Ivan Tarkhanov may refer to:

- Ivan Tarkhanov (painter) (1780–1848), Russian painter
- Ivan Tarkhanov (physiologist) (1846–1908), Georgian physiologist
