= Wenig =

Wenig is a surname. Notable people with the surname include:

- Carl Wenig (1830-1908), Baltic-German painter
- Devin Wenig (born 1966), American business executive, former CEO of eBay
- Josef Wenig (1896-1981), German labour and political activist
- Margaret Wenig (born 1957), American rabbi
- Obe Wenig (1895–1959), American football player
