= List of 19th-century Russian painters =

This is a list of 19th-century Russian painters.

- Abram Arkhipov 1862–1930
- Alexander Golovin 1863–1930
- Aleksey Kivshenko 1851–1895
- Alexander Ivanov 1806–1858
- Alexei Korzukhin 1835–1894
- Alexei Savrasov 1830–1897
- Alexey Bogolyubov 1824–1896
- Alexey Tyranov 1808–1859
- Alexey Venetsianov 1780–1847
- Andrei Ryabushkin 1861–1904
- Anton Legashov 1798–1865
- Apollinary Vasnetsov 1856–1933
- Dmitry Levitsky 1735–1822
- Eugene Lanceray 1875–1946
- Evgraf Krendovsky 1810–1870
- Fedot Sychkov 1870–1958
- Fyodor Tolstoy 1783–1873
- Fyodor Rokotov 1736–1808
- Fyodor Slavyansky 1817–1876
- Fyodor Vasilyev 1850–1873
- Grigoriy Myasoyedov 1834–1911
- Illarion Pryanishnikov 1840–1894
- Ilya Ostroukhov 1858–1929
- Ilya Repin 1844–1930
- Isaac Levitan 1860–1900
- Ivan Aivazovsky 1817–1900
- Ivan Shishkin 1832–1898
- Ivan Tarkhanov 1780–1848
- Klavdiy Lebedev 1852–1916
- Konstantin Korovin 1861–1939
- Konstantin Makovsky 1839–1915
- Konstantin Savitsky 1844–1905
- Konstantin Yuon 1875–1958
- Mikhail Lebedev 1811–1837
- Mikhail Ivanov 1748–1823
- Mikhail Nesterov 1862–1942
- Nikolai Kasatkin 1859–1930
- Nikolai Bogdanov-Belsky 1868–1945
- Nikolai Dmitriev-Orenburgsky 1837–1898
- Nikolai Ge 1831–1894
- Nikolai Nevrev 1830–1904
- Nikolai Zagorsky 1849–1893
- Nikolay Koshelev 1840–1918
- Nikolay Makovsky 1841–1886
- Orest Kiprensky 1782–1836
- Pavel Fedotov 1815–1852
- Pyotr Sokolov 1791–1848
- Pyotr Vereshchagin 1834–1886
- Semion Shchedrin 1745–1804
- Silvestr Schchedrin 1791–1830
- Stepan Alexandrovsky 1842–1906
- Valentin Serov 1865–1911
- Vasili Pukirev 1832–1890
- Vasily Kamensky 1866–1944
- Vasily Perov 1834–1882
- Vasily Polenov 1844–1927
- Vasily Sadovnikov 1800–1879
- Vasily Surikov 1848–1916
- Vasily Tropinin 1776–1856
- Vasily Vereshchagin 1842–1904
- Vassily Maximov 1844–1911
- Viktor Vasnetsov 1848–1926
- Vladimir Makovsky 1846–1920
- Yefim Volkov 1844–1920
- Yelena Polenova 1850–1898

== See also ==
- List of 20th-century Russian painters
- List of Russian artists
