= Nikolay Koshelev =

Russian painter

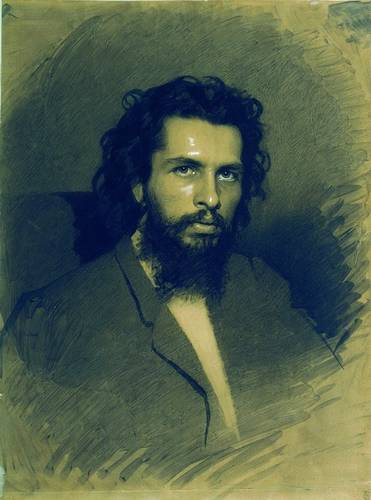
- Portrait drawing by Ivan Kramskoi, 1866
- Born: 3 May 1840; Serman, Penza Governorate, Russia
- Died: 1918 (aged 77–78); Petrograd, Russia

Nikolay Andreyevich Koshelev (Russian: Никола́й Андре́евич Ко́шелев) (1840 – 1918) was a Russian painter, illustrator and muralist. He specialized in portraits and genre scenes, as well as icon painting.

== Biography ==
He was born to a peasant family, composed of serfs. He spent most of his childhood in the city of Arzamas, where he frequented the studios of Alexander Stupin, but lacked the means to take lessons. In 1851, he was apprenticed to a decorative painter named Davydov in Nizhni-Novgorod, but this was not a success, so he was remanded into the service of a local landowner, where he taught himself how to paint.

In 1856, impressed by his progress, his patroness took him to the art school in Kazan where he received lessons from an expatriate Italian artist named Botelli. This was followed by independent work on an iconostasis and a monastery wall. This became the basis for his acceptance at the Imperial Academy of Arts in 1860.

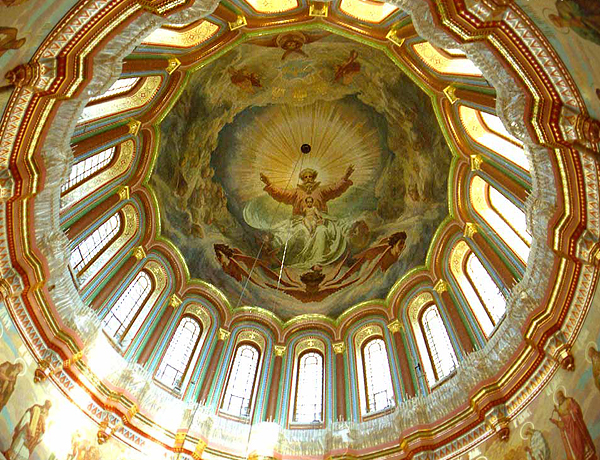
The main dome

He did not, however, become a full-time student until 1863, when he began to study history painting under Alexey Tarasovich Markov and Fyodor Bruni. That same year, his financial situation improved greatly when he was able to sell several paintings. In 1864, he was awarded a gold medal for his depiction of Hermes lulling Argus to sleep. He also began working with a collective of his fellow students and participated in icon painting projects. The following year, he was named an "Artist First Class".

When the collective broke up, he joined Ivan Kramskoi at the Artel of Artists; a group which later formed the basis for the Peredvizhniki. Later that year, he participated in one of the Artel's major exhibitions in Nizhni-Novgorod. He also began doing illustrations. Shortly after he, Kramskoi, Markov and Bogdan Wenig went to Moscow to paint the main dome at the Cathedral of Christ the Saviour. The result was a great success and Koshelev received separate commissions to paint the small domes. He worked from drawings made by Pyotr Basin, whose eyesight had become too poor for him to do the work himself. As a reward for his continuing efforts, he was named an "Academician" in 1873 and a Professor in 1878.

In 1880, he used some of his earnings for a study trip to Rome. Two years later, he worked on restoring the murals at Saint Isaac's Cathedral, under the direction of the architect, Maximilian Messmacher. In 1894, he was one of the founders of the Nizhni-Novgorod Art and Historical Museum. From 1895 to 1899, he created sketches for the mosaics and murals in the Church of the Savior on Blood. Around 1900, he took an extended trip to create icons at the new Cathedral of the Most Holy Trinity, Buenos Aires. During this time, he also did some teaching and served as an "Inspector" at the Stroganov Moscow State Academy of Arts and Industry as well as showing his canvases at numerous exhibitions.

In 1903, he travelled to Crimea and, from 1911 to 1912, participated in the first meetings of the All-Russian Congress of Artists. Little is known of him after that time. Due to his close association with religious art, it may be assumed that he retired to private life when the revolutionary movements began.

== Artistic heritage ==
Most of Koshelev's paintings and watercolours are in the State Russian Museum. Early works can be found in the State Tretyakov Gallery. Many of the works the artist gave to the Nizhny Novgorod State Art Museum. There are separate pictures in the Donetsk Regional Art Museum, the Mordovia Republican Museum of Fine Arts.

The picture gallery created by the artist at the Alexandrov House in Jerusalem has been preserved.

Many frescoes from the cathedral in Warsaw were taken to the Intercession Cathedral in Baranavichy, Belarus.

== Selected paintings ==
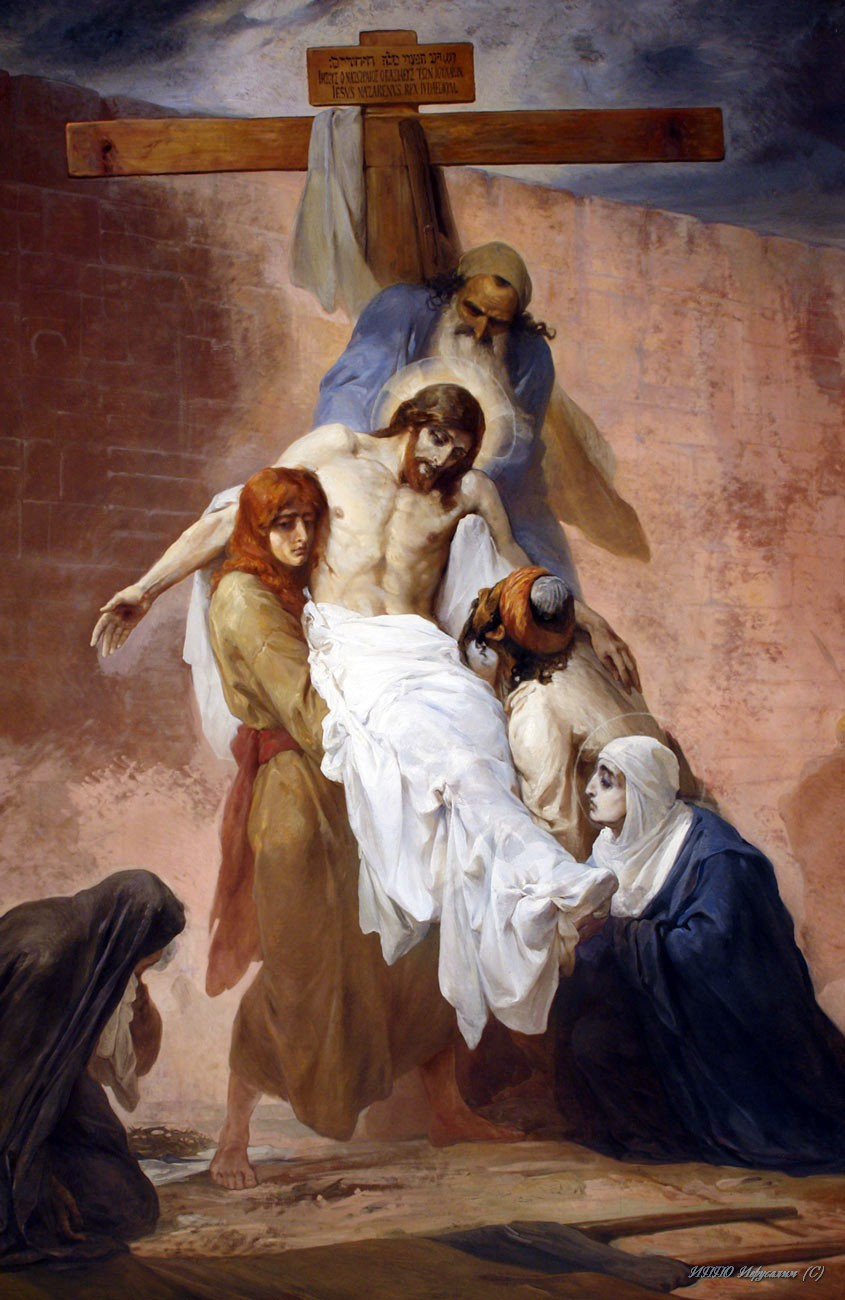
Descent from the Cross

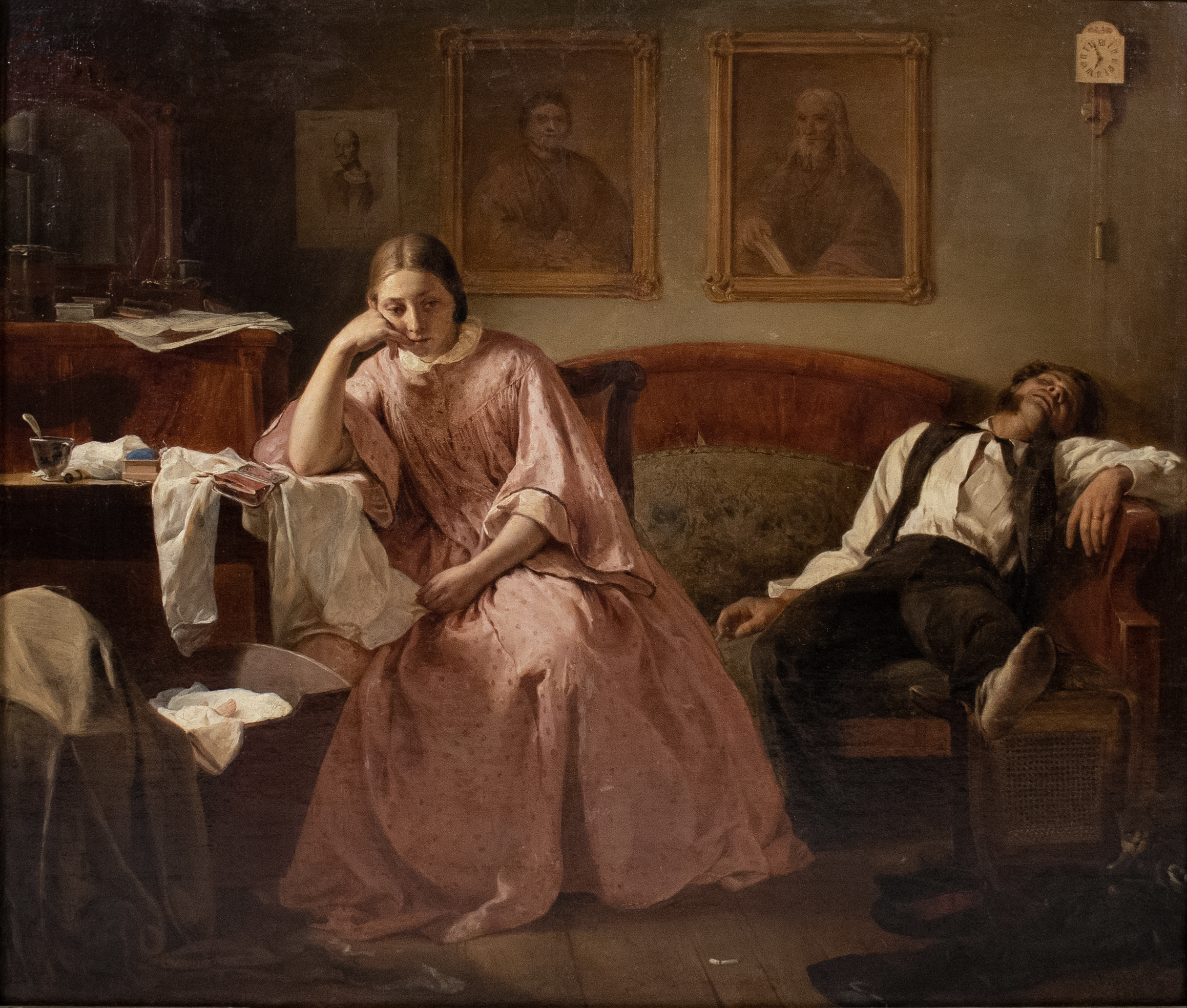
Scene from the Life of a Bureaucrat

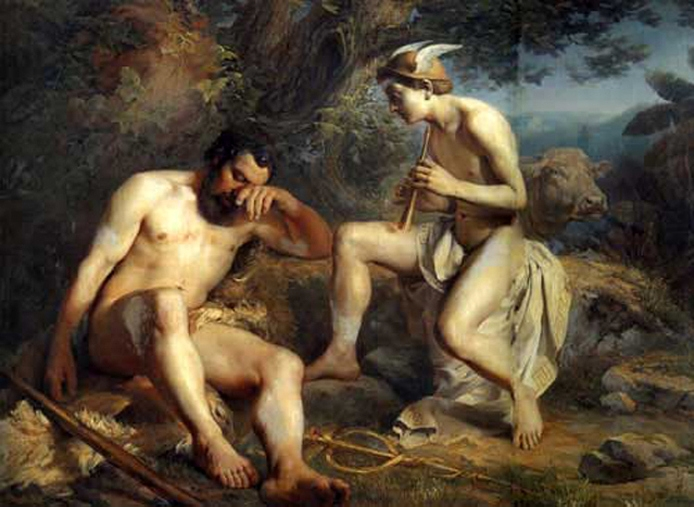
Hermes Putting Argus to Sleep

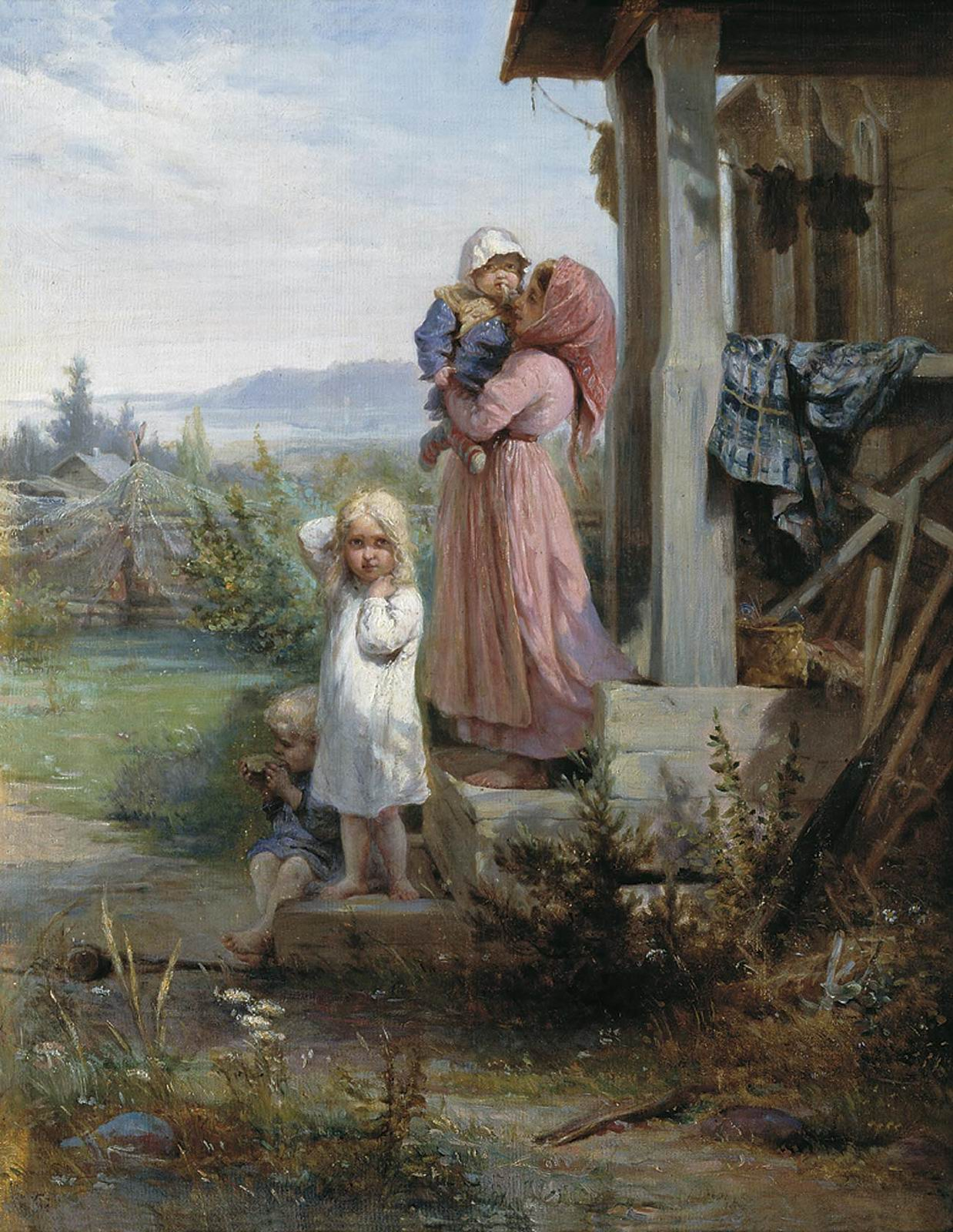
Morning in the Village
