= Pyotr Basin =

Russian religious, history and portrait painter

- Пётр Васильевич Басин
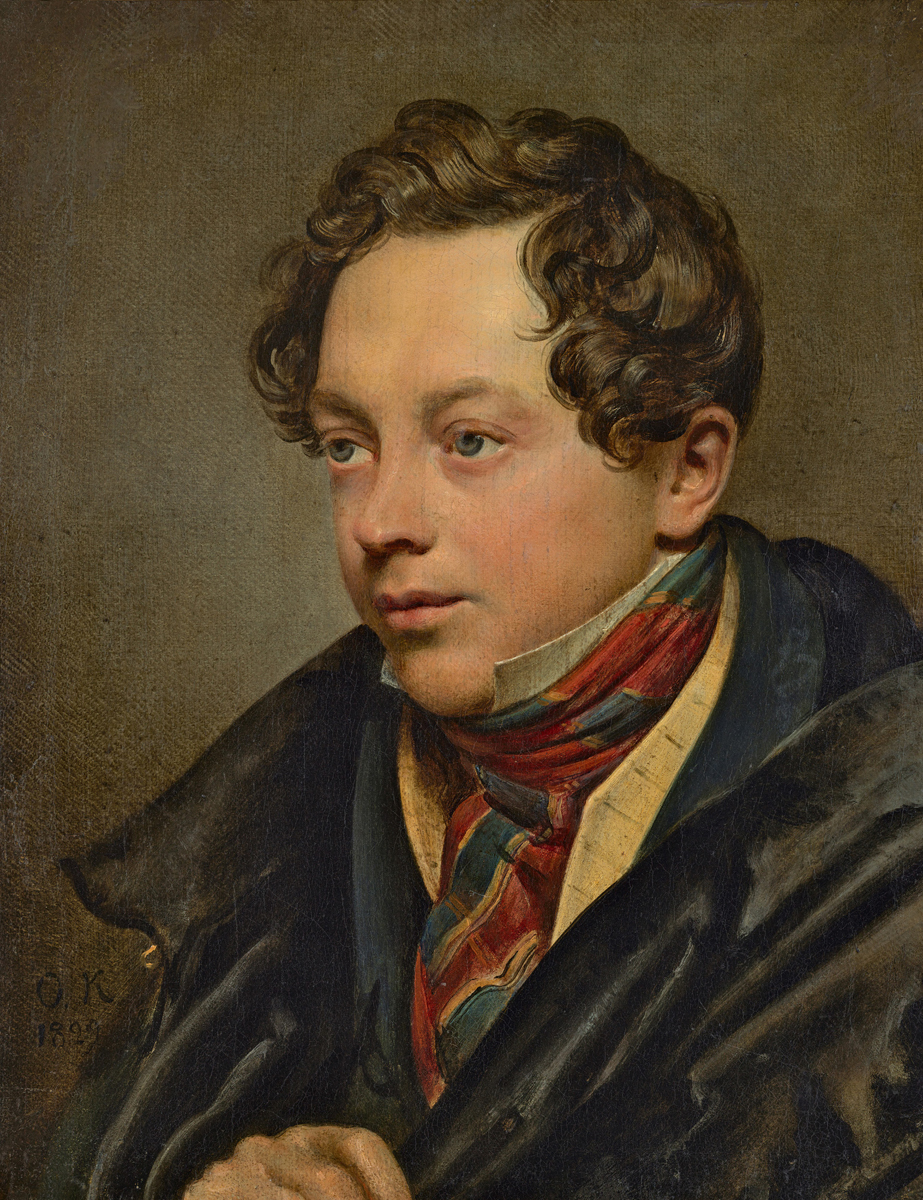
- Portrait by Orest Kiprensky, 1829, oils; Russian Museum
- Born: June 25, 1793; Saint Petersburg
- Died: July 16, 1877 (aged 84); Saint Petersburg
- Resting place: Novodevichy Cemetery, Saint Petersburg
- Education: Vasily Shebuyev
- Alma mater: Imperial Academy of Arts (1818)
- Known for: Painting
- Spouse: Olga Nazanskaya (m. 1838; died 1849)
- Children: six, including Nikolai
- Awards: Big Gold Medal of the Imperial Academy of Arts (1818)
- Elected: Member Academy of Arts (1830)

Pyotr Vasilievich Basin (Russian: Пётр Васи́льевич Ба́син; 1793, Saint Petersburg – 1877, Saint Petersburg) was a Russian religious, history and portrait painter during the Romantic period. He also served as a Professor at the Imperial Academy of Arts.

== Biography ==
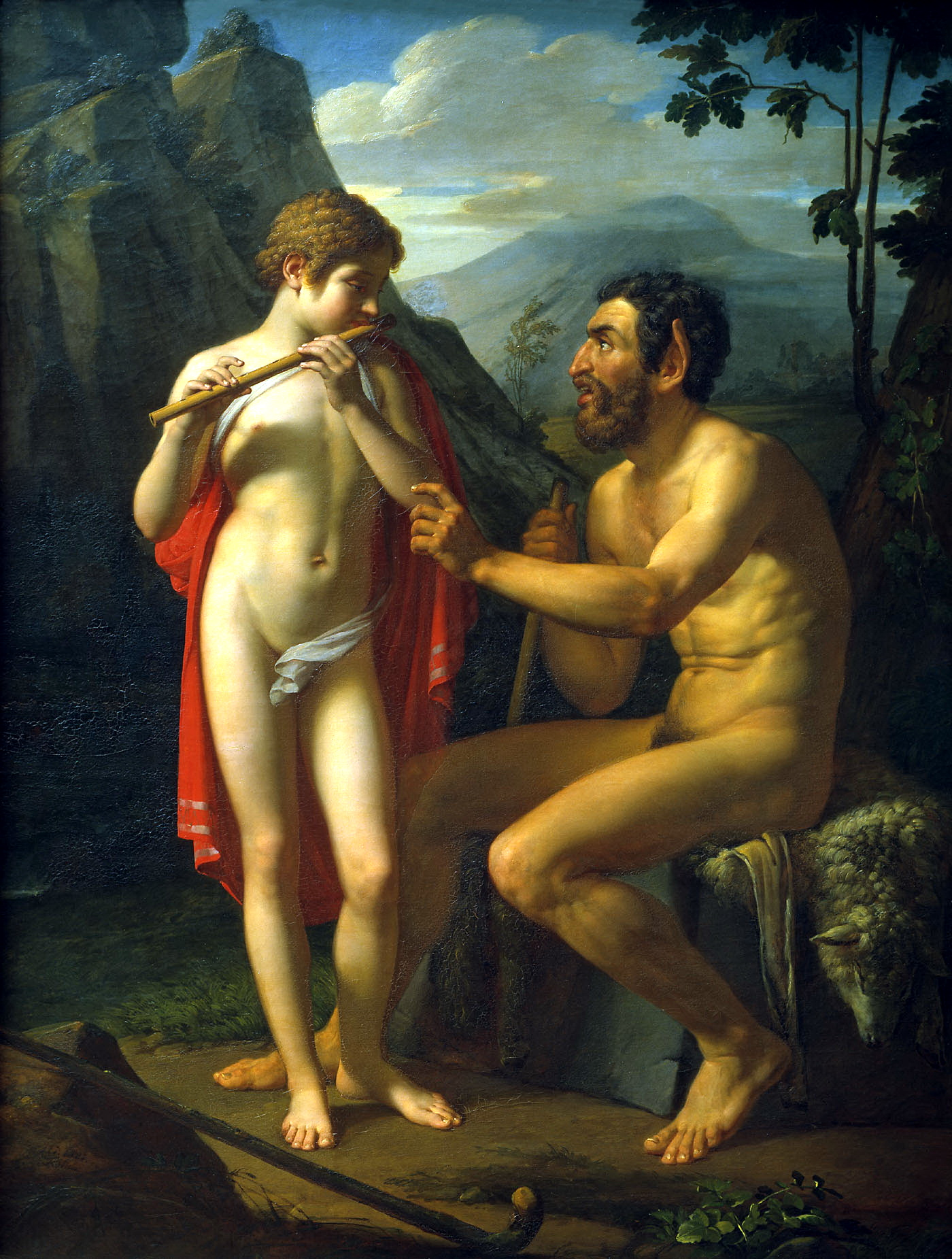
Marsyas Teaches Young Olympus to Play the Flute (1821)

Beginning in 1811, he audited classes at the Imperial Academy of Arts. In 1813, he was admitted as a student of Vasily Shebuyev. After graduating, he spent the next eleven years in Rome on a fellowship, which he was given for his painting of Christ driving the money changers from the Temple. While there, he copied the works of Raphael and created almost 100 paintings of his own, many on mythological subjects. He also created genre scenes, from the countryside, and portraits, including one of the painter, Sylvester Shchedrin.

Upon his return to Saint Petersburg in 1830, having been recalled by Tsar Nicholas I to work on a project, he was made an Academician for his portrayal of Socrates saving Alcibiades (1828). The painting itself required some saving, as the ship carrying it from Rome was wrecked, causing water damage, and it had to be reconstructed on its arrival.

After that, he began teaching and was appointed a Professor in 1836, a position he held until 1869 when he became a Professor Emeritus and State Councilor. He was forced to retire shortly after, due to a progressive eye disease. He had lost his eyesight entirely by the end of 1870.

During the time he was a Professor, he created numerous portraits (including those of Mikhail Kutuzov and Hans Karl von Diebitsch) and allegorical scenes for the restoration of the Winter Palace, after the disastrous fire in 1837, but his religious works are the most familiar. They include forty paintings and icons for Saint Isaac's Cathedral, many created from sketches by Karl Bryullov, including a "Sermon on the Mount".

He also worked at Kazan Cathedral and the church of the Imperial Academy, where he produced an altarpiece and several iconostases. He occasionally painted outside Saint Petersburg, visiting cathedrals as near as Petergof and as far as Tiflis. After losing his sight, some of his earlier sketches were used as models for paintings at the Cathedral of Christ the Savior, executed by Nikolay Koshelev.

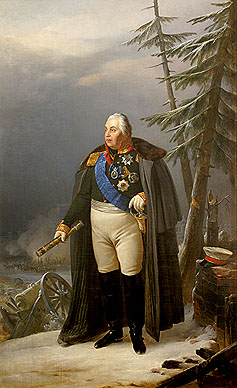
Prince Mikhail Kutuzov, after Roman Volkov, 1834; Winter Palace, St. Petersburg

Curators of art collections often consulted him as an expert. This included the purchase of a collection belonging to Princess Anastasiya Trubetskaya, and selected works from the collection of King William II of the Netherlands, both for the Winter Palace, and the sculpture collection of Vasily Demut-Malinovsky, for the Imperial Academy.

He is mentioned in a story ("The Artist") by Taras Shevchenko. His best-known student was Nikolai Ge. Many of his works may be seen at the Russian Museum, as well as at several in Moscow.
