= Ivan Makarov =

Russian painter (1822–1897)

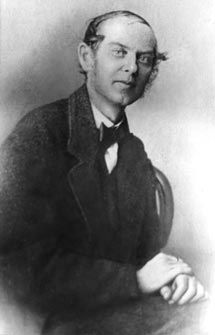
- Born: April 4, 1822; Arzamas, Russia
- Died: April 21, 1897 (aged 75); Saint Petersburg, Russia
- Education: Imperial Academy of Arts
- Known for: Portrait painting
- Elected: Member Academy of Arts (1855)

Ivan Kuzmich Makarov (Russian: Ива́н Кузьми́ч Мака́ров; 4 April [O.S. 23 March] 1822 — 21 [O.S. 9] April 1897) was a Russian portrait painter.

== Biography ==
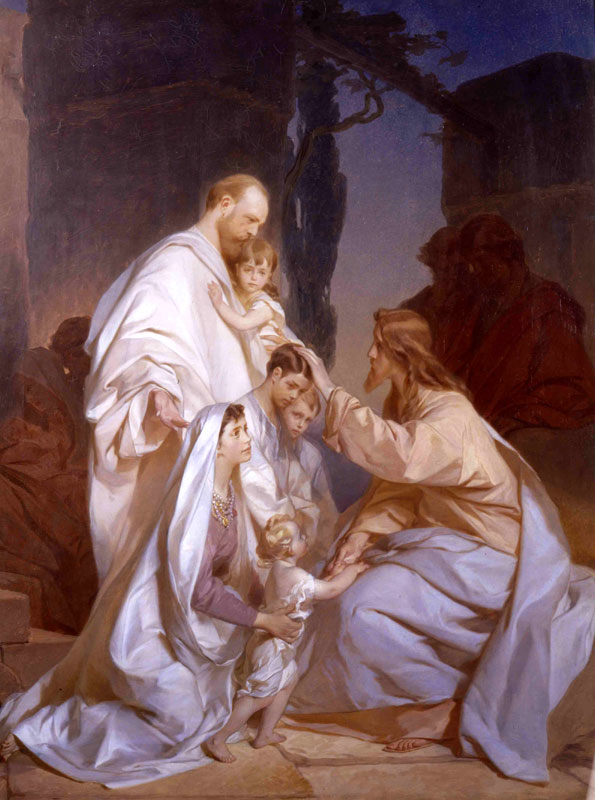
God's Blessing on You (the family of emperor Alexander III with Christ, date unknown)

He was born while his father (a serf) was a student of Alexander Stupin at the Arzamas School of Painting, Russia's first provincial art school. When he had completed his basic education at the district school in Saransk, he studied with his father and Stupin, soon becoming an assistant on several church painting projects.

On the basis of sketches and drawings he sent to the Imperial Academy of Arts in 1842, he obtained the privilege of being a "Free Artist". In 1845, he moved to Saint Petersburg, where he studied at the academy under the history painter Alexey Markov.

After two years there, he chose portraiture as his speciality, soon winning the patronage of the Grand Duchess Maria Nikolaevna. In 1853, he travelled extensively, visiting Berlin, Dresden, Munich, Venice, Bologna and Rome. Upon his return to Saint Petersburg, he was named an "Academician".

Despite this, most of his portraits do not have an academic flavor. He was particularly good at portraying women and children. As is the case with most pre-revolutionary Russian painters, he also produced many icons and religious murals; most notably "God's Blessing On You" (in the Alexander Palace).

== Gallery ==
Portraits by Ivan Makarov

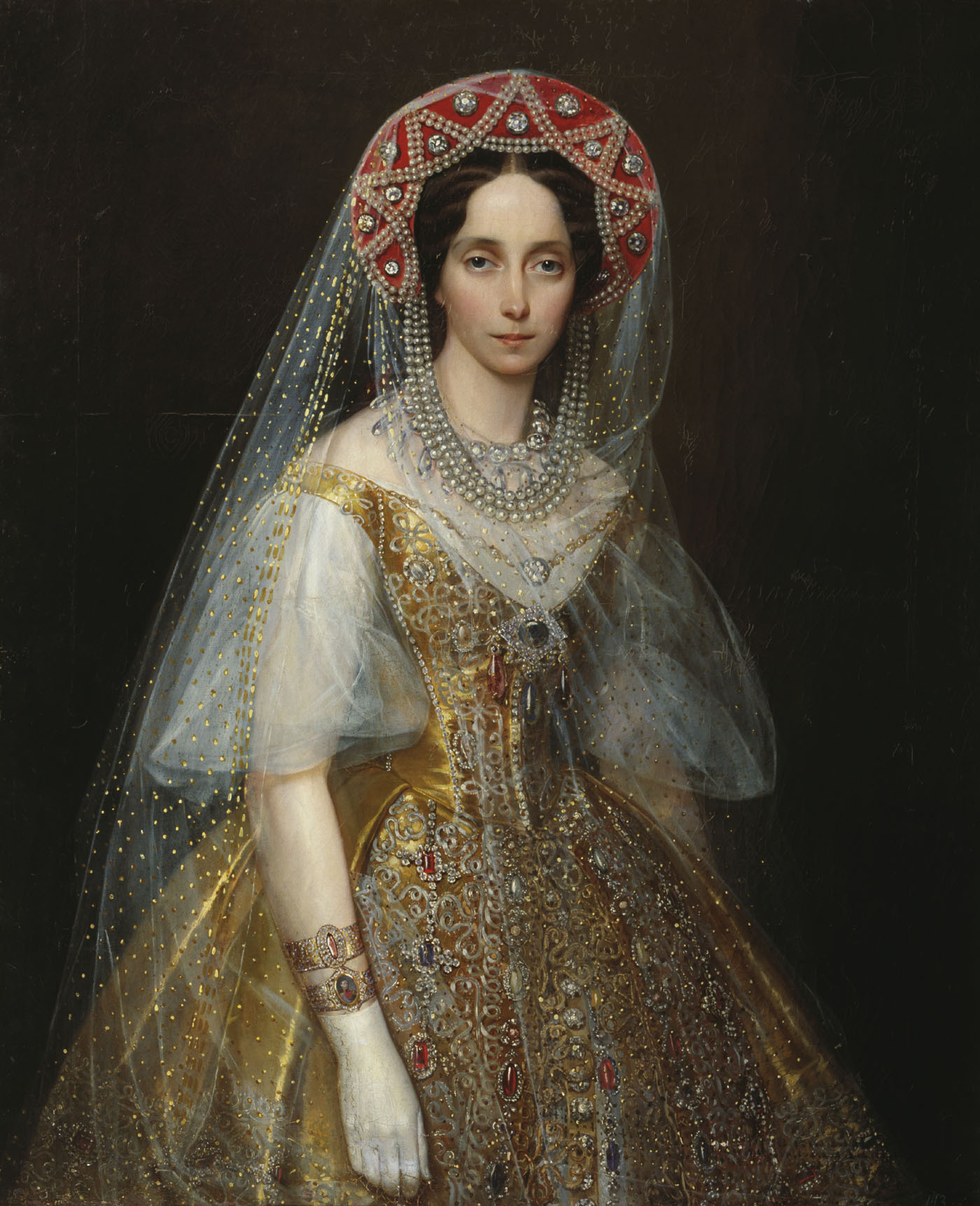
Portrait of Empress Maria Alexandrovna

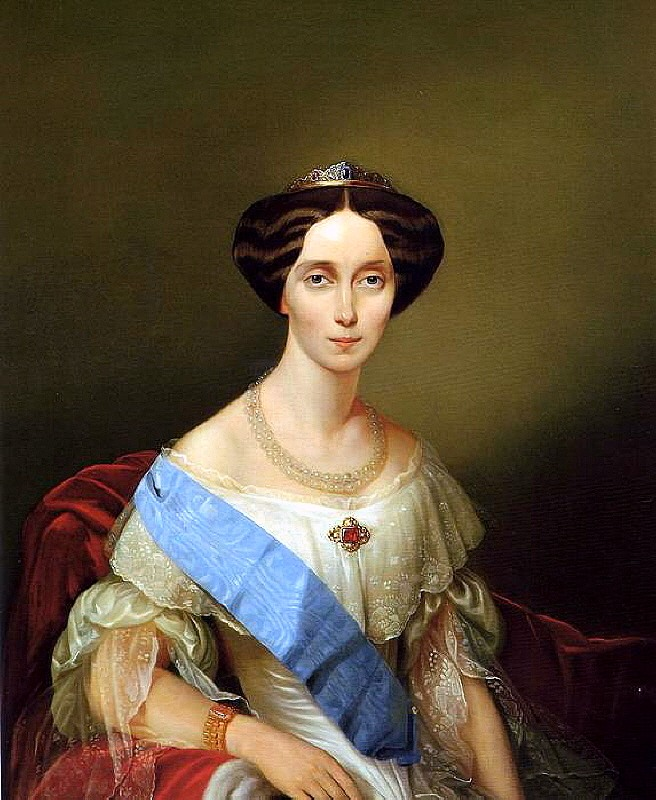
Portrait of Empress Maria Alexandrovna

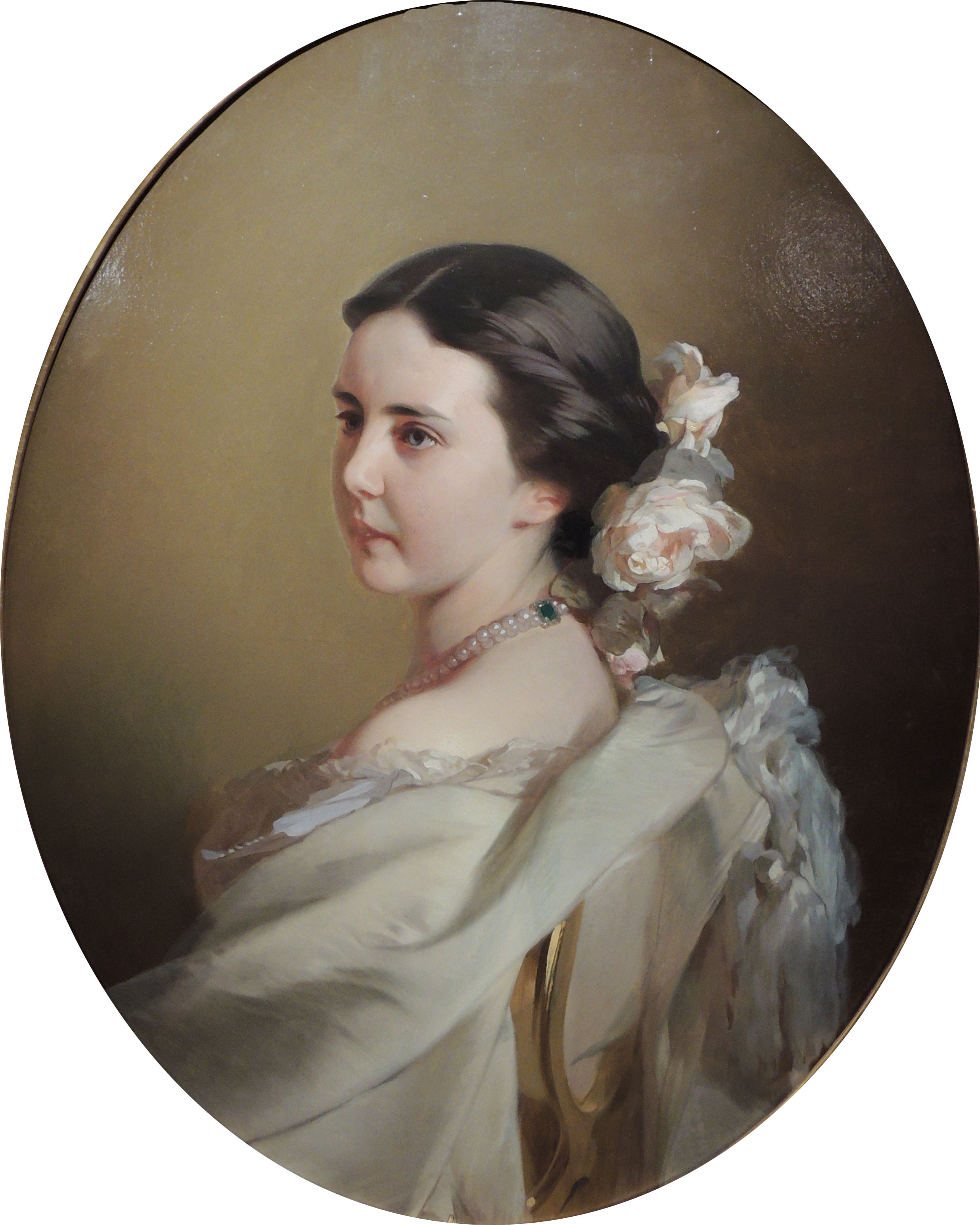
Portrait of Catherine Tyutcheva

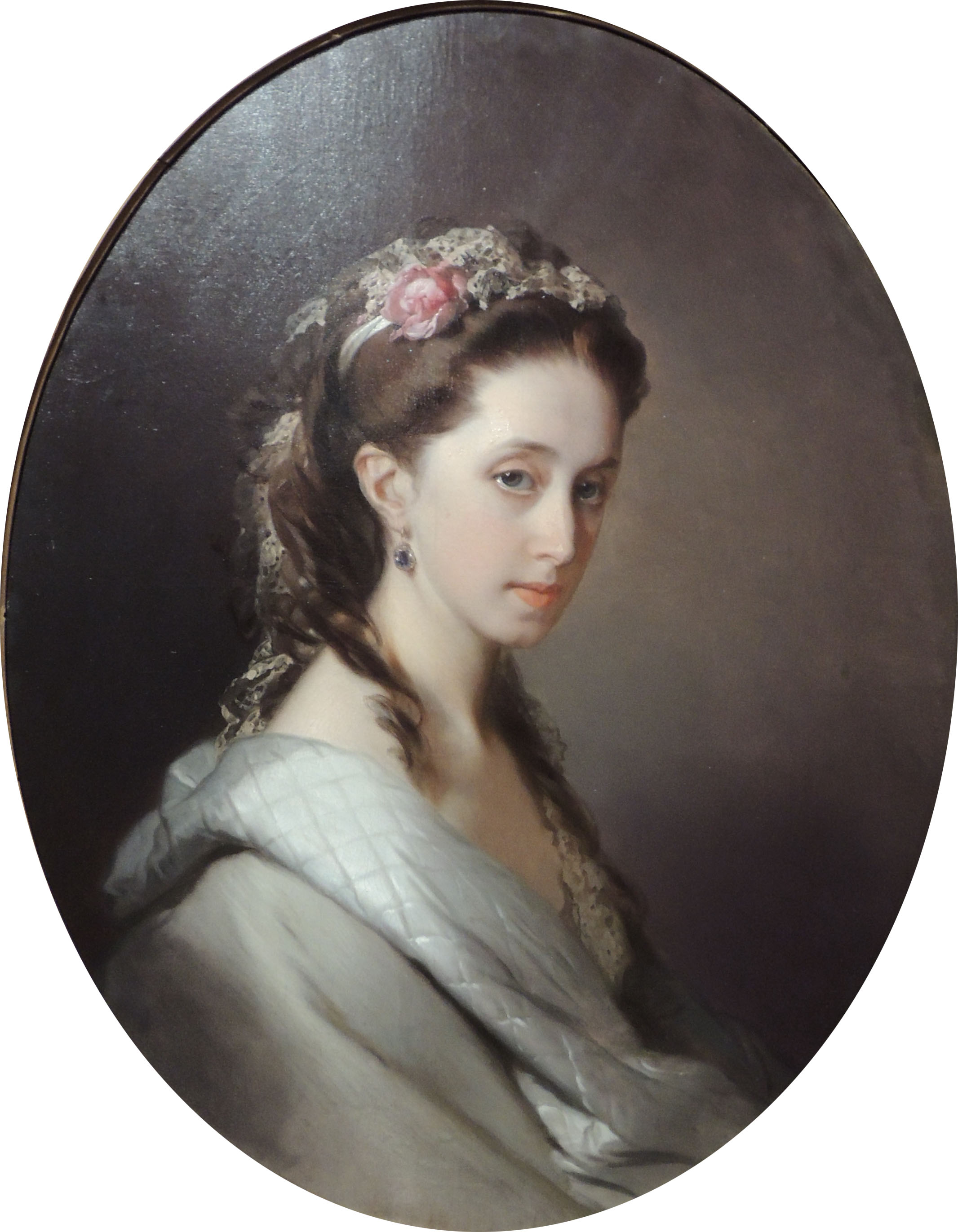
Portrait of Evdokia Tregubova (1869)

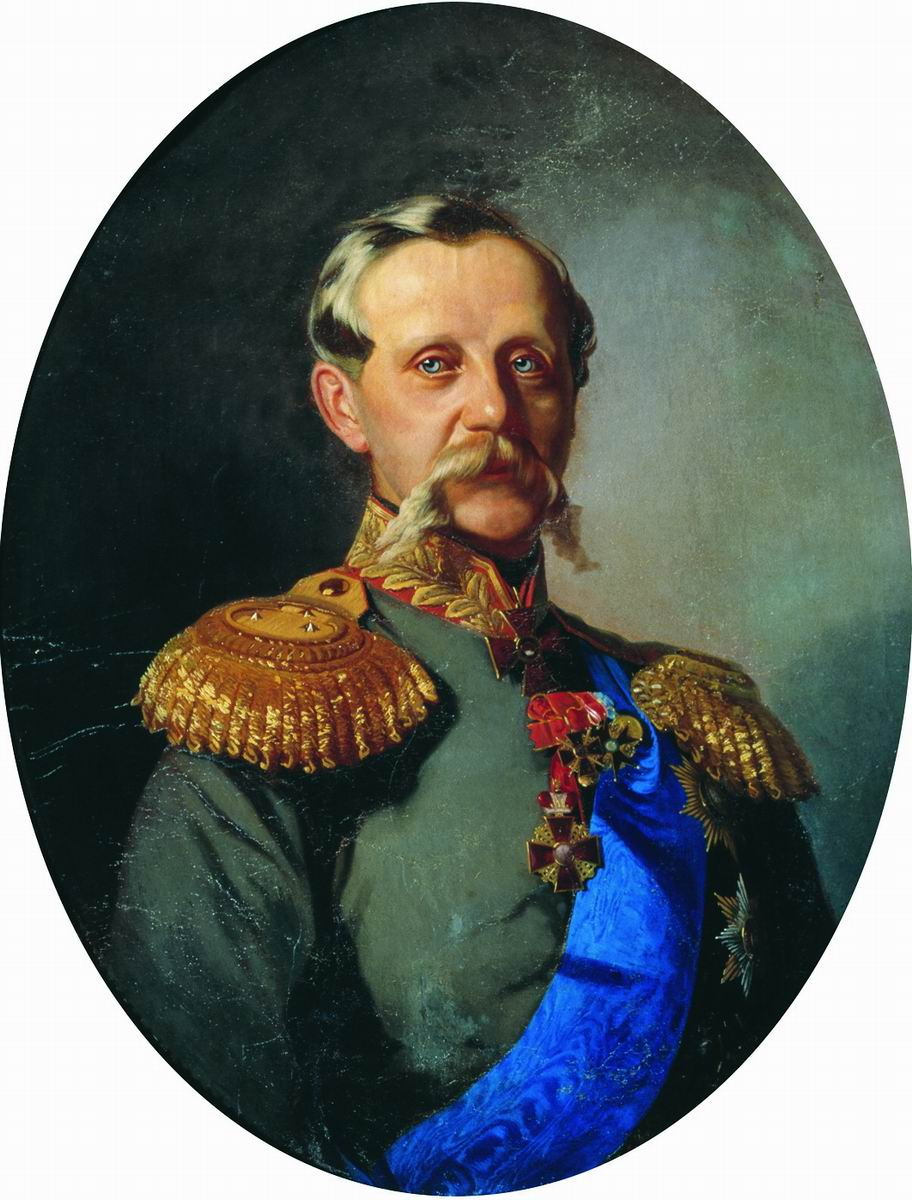
Portrait of General Samsonov (1869)
