= Fyodor Slavyansky =

Russian painter

Fyodor Mikhailovich Slavyansky
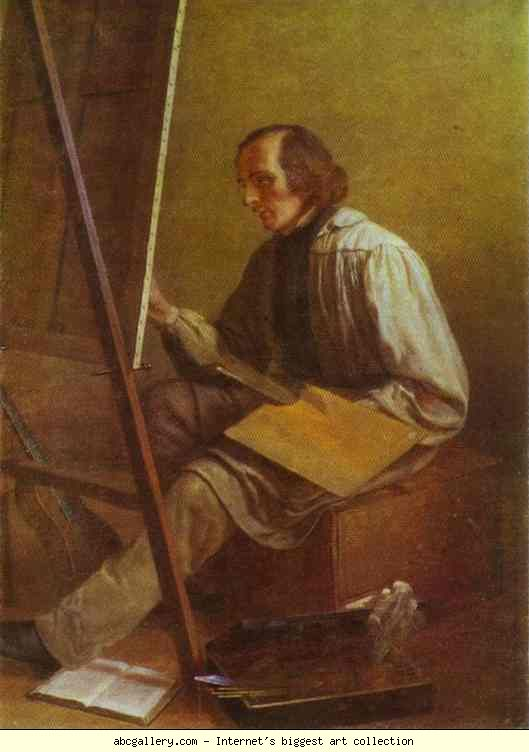
- Fedor Slavyansky. Self-Portrait. 1850s. Oil on canvas. The Russian Museum, St. Petersburg, Russia
- Born: c. 1817
- Died: 1876 (aged 58–59)
- Alma mater: Imperial Academy of Arts (1846)
- Known for: Painting

Fyodor Mikhailovich Slavyansky (Russian: Фёдор Михайлович Славянский; 1817–1876) was a Russian painter. He was born a serf of the landlady Avdotya Nikolayevna Semenova, in the village of Vyshkovo in Tver Guberniya. He became Venetsianov’s student in 1839 in his estate of Safonkovo. Venetsianov did his best to buy freedom to Slavyansky. In 1840, he asked the Academy to allow his student to visit lessons in drawing. Slavyansky studied in classes of professors Varnek and Markov, and simultaneously worked with Venetsianov. In 1845, he got the title of a freelance artist.

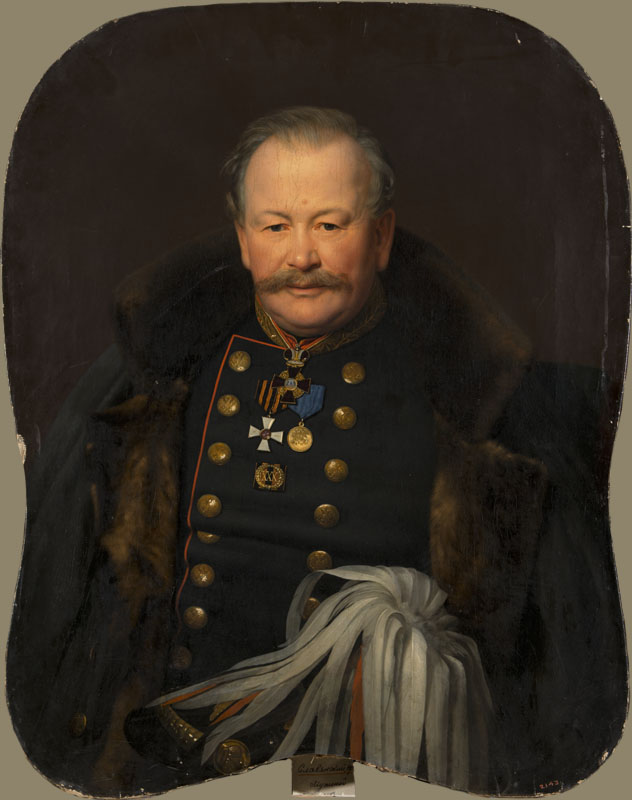
Grigory Demortie

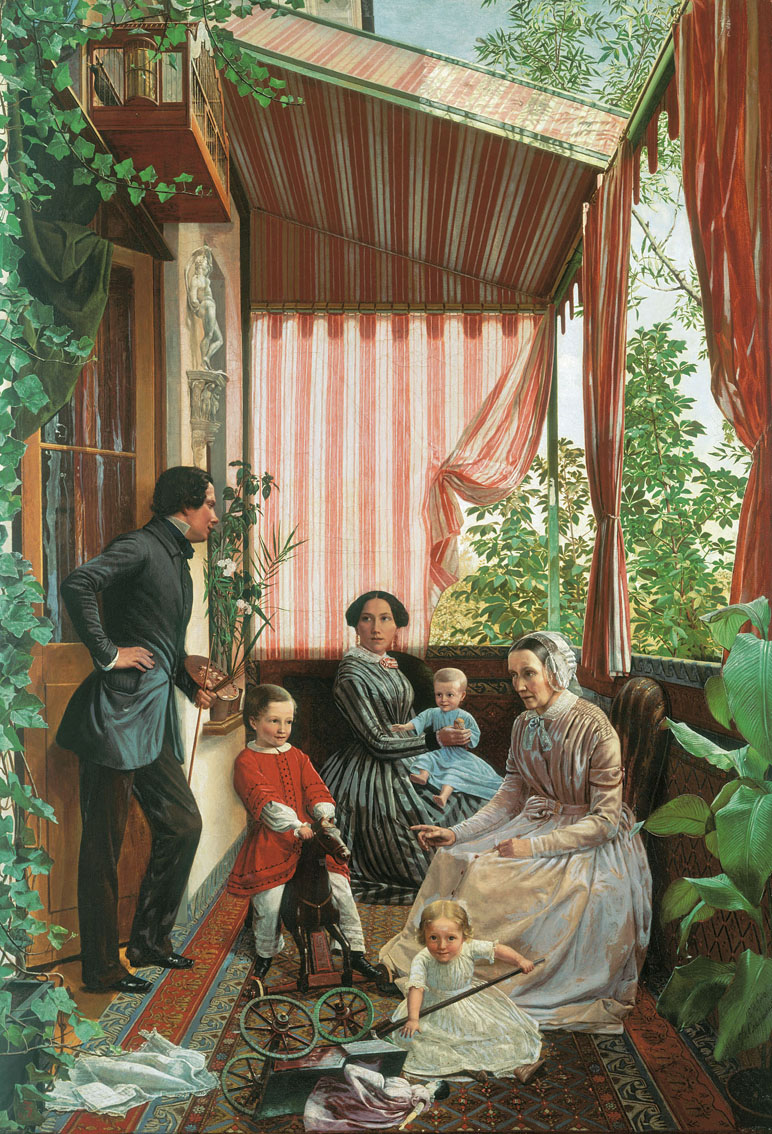
Family Picture (On The Balcony)

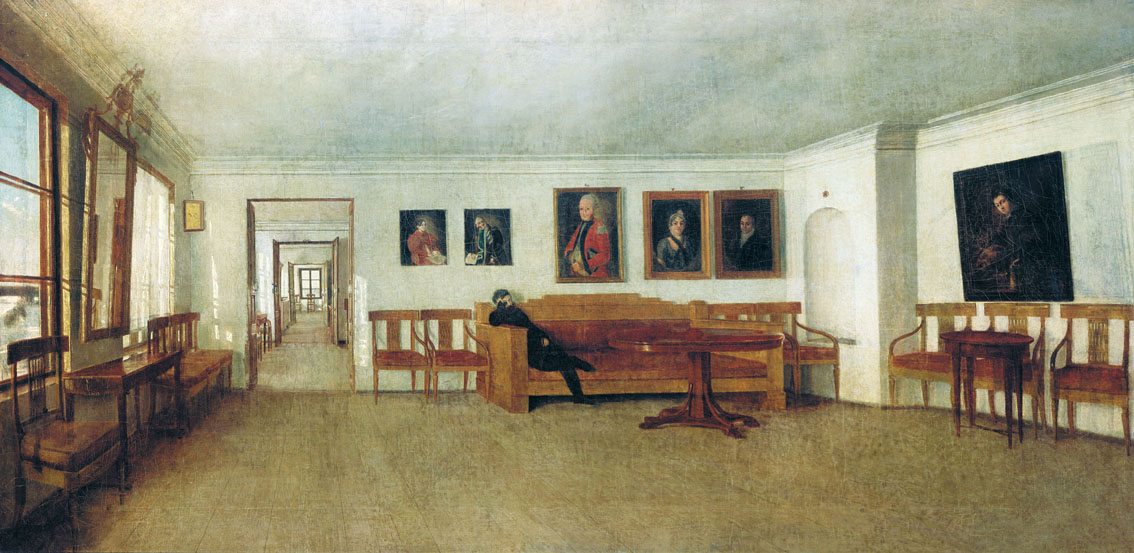
In the rooms of A. Semyonsky

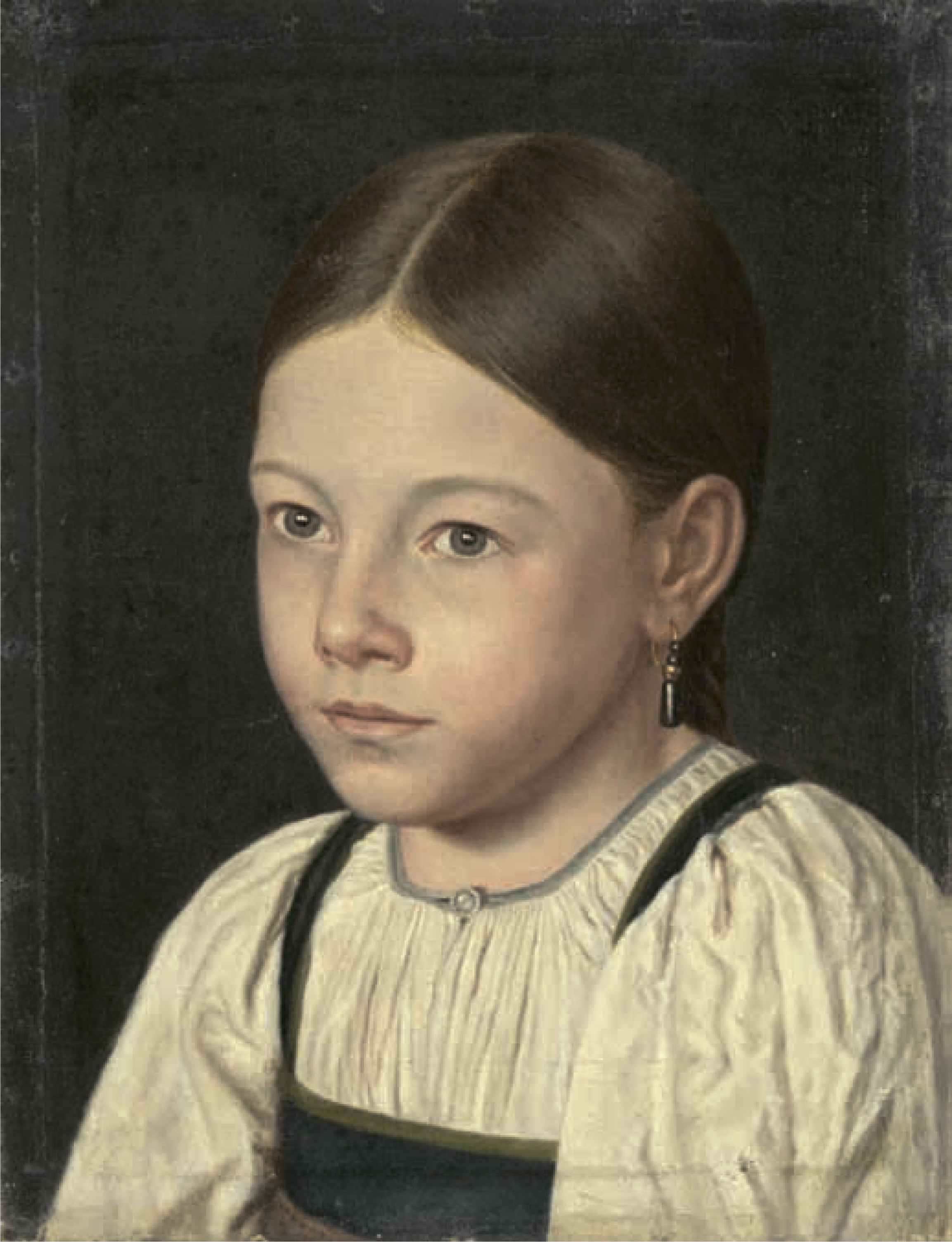
Peasant's Girl by F. Slavyansky, 1830s. Oil on canvas. The Russian Museum, St. Petersburg, Russia.
