= Vasily Shebuyev =

Russian painter, State Councilor and Rector at the Imperial Academy of Arts

- Василий Козьмич Шебуев
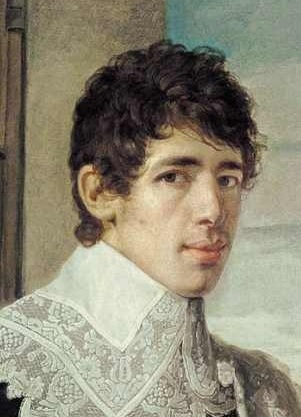
- Self-portrait (1805) a fragment of the painting "Divination"
- Born: April 2, 1777; Kronstadt
- Died: June 16, 1855 (aged 78); St. Petersburg
- Resting place: Smolensky Cemetery, St. Petersburg
- Education: Imperial Academy of Arts (1797)
- Known for: Painting
- Style: Classicism, Academism
- Elected: Member Academy of Arts (1807); Professor by rank (1812)

Vasily Kuzmich Shebuyev (Russian: Васи́лий Козьми́ч Шебу́ев; April 13 [O.S. April 2] 1777, in Kronstadt – June 28 [O.S. June 16] 1855 (Note: "ШЕБУЕВ • Большая российская энциклопедия - электронная версия" (in Russian). Archived from the original on 2021-10-31. Other sources give the date of death as June 17 [O.S.] or June 18 [O.S.].), in Saint Petersburg) was a Russian painter and draughtsman in the Neo-Classical style, active in St. Petersburg during Tsars Alexander I and Nicholas I's reigns, best known for history pictures.

== Biography ==
His father was of noble lineage and served as the ranking custodian of materiels at the Admiralty Board. His artistic abilities were noticed early and he began taking lessons at the Imperial Academy as soon as he was old enough. In 1794, he officially became a student there, studying under Ivan Akimov and Grigory Ugryumov. He won a silver after his first year, and a gold medal the year following. In 1797, he graduated with a first degree certificate. He immediately became an assistant teacher and, a year later, was entrusted with teaching drawing to younger students.

In 1803, he was sent on a fellowship to study in Rome, where he practiced copying the old masters and made anatomical drawings from observing dissections. Three years later, he was recalled to Saint Petersburg to participate in decorating the Kazan Cathedral. After that, his life became devoted to the Academy. He was named an Academician in 1807, rose through the ranks, and eventually became Rector of Painting and Sculpture in 1832. Ten years later his title became the "Honored Rector". In 1831, he used his anatomical drawing experience to create anatomy textbooks for art students. Among those who studied under him at the Academy, one may name Karl Briullov, Alexander Ivanov, Fyodor Bruni and Pyotr Basin.

In addition to his responsibilities there, he was appointed Director of the Imperial Tapestry Manufactory in 1831, having earlier been made a Court Painter in 1823, in which capacity he oversaw the creation of the church canopy at Tsarskoye Selo. He was also named Supervisor of Paintings for Saint Isaac's Cathedral in 1844.

== Works ==
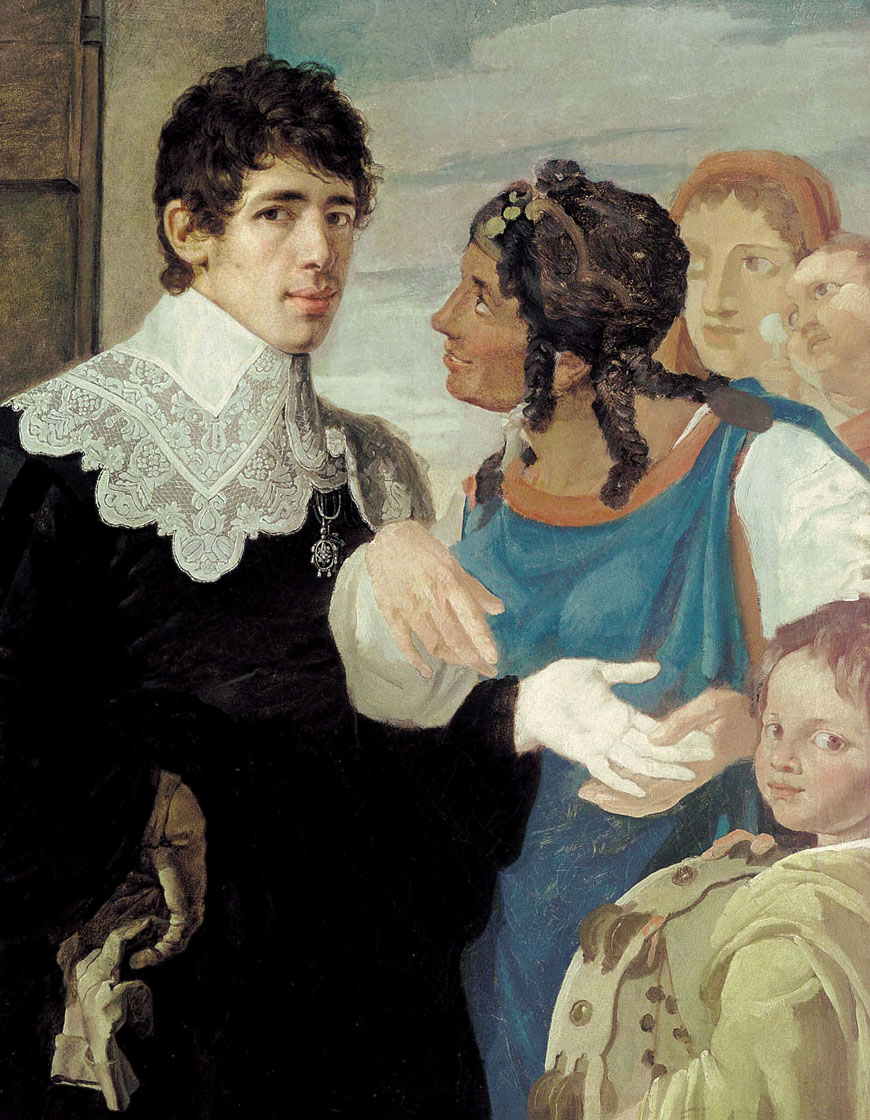
Self-portrait with fortune-teller (1805)

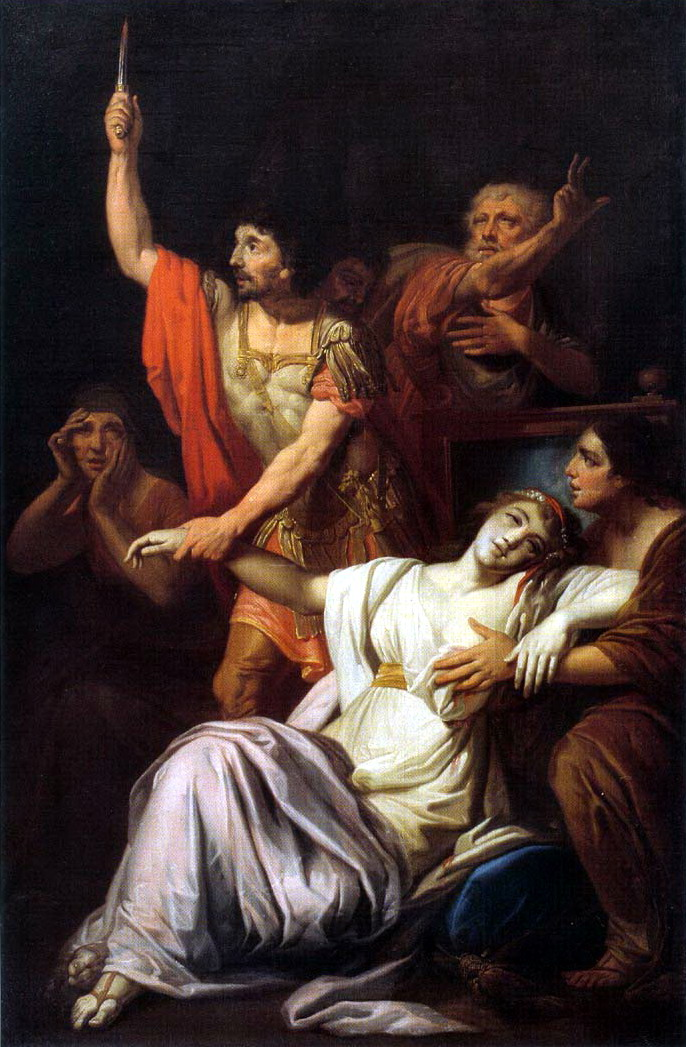
The Death of Camilla (1821)

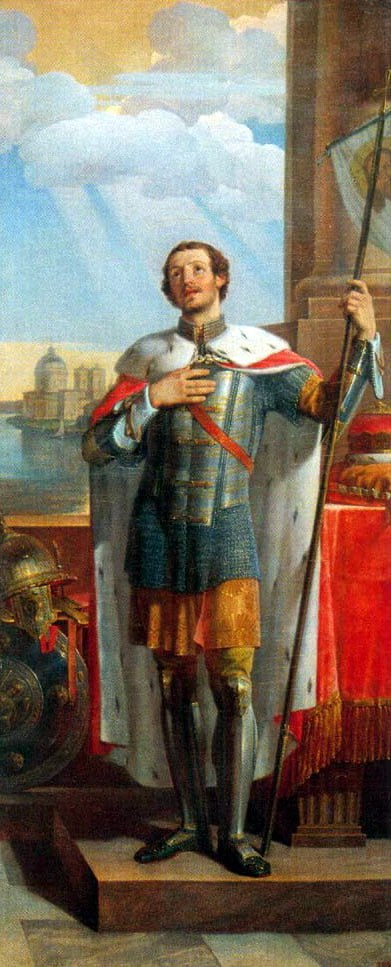
Alexander Nevsky (1836)

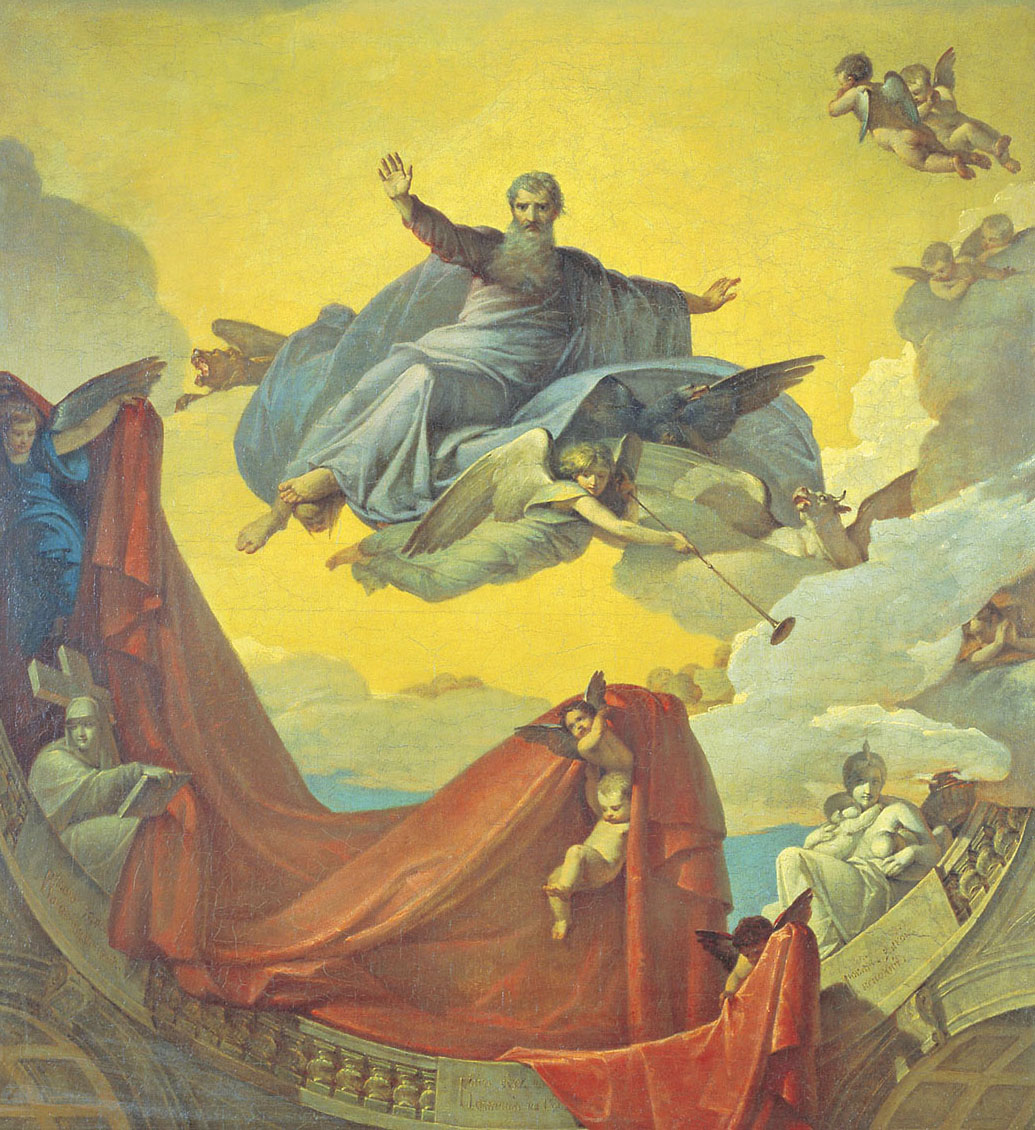
The vision of the prophet Ezekiel (1836)

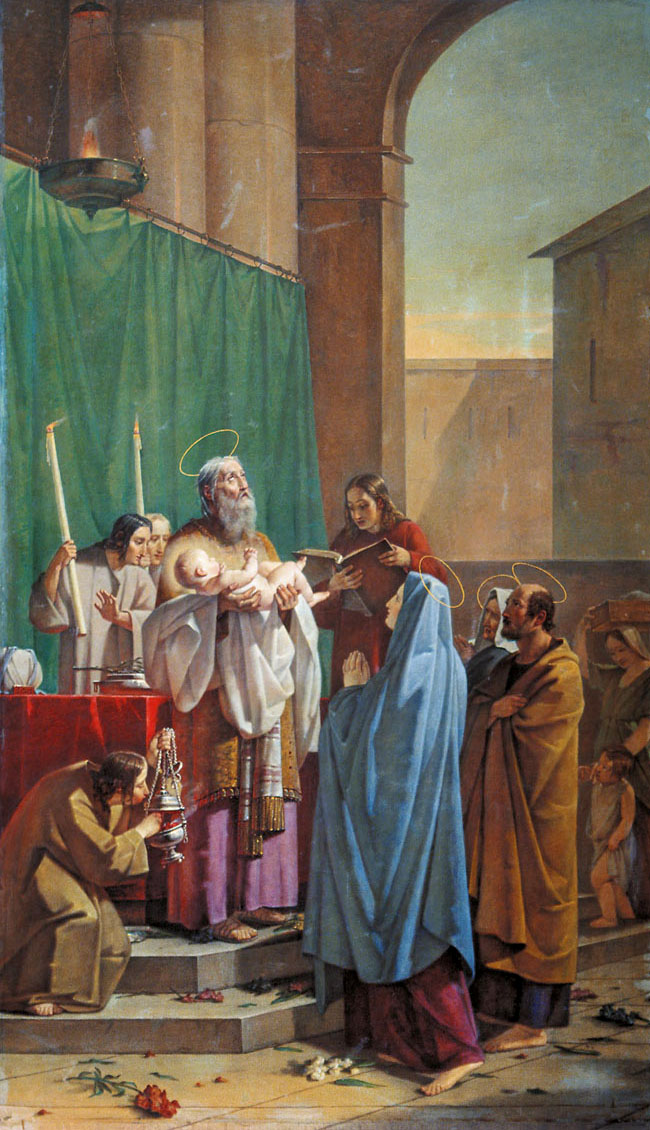
Simeon (Gospel of Luke) (1847)
