= Carl Wenig =

Russian painter (1830–1908)

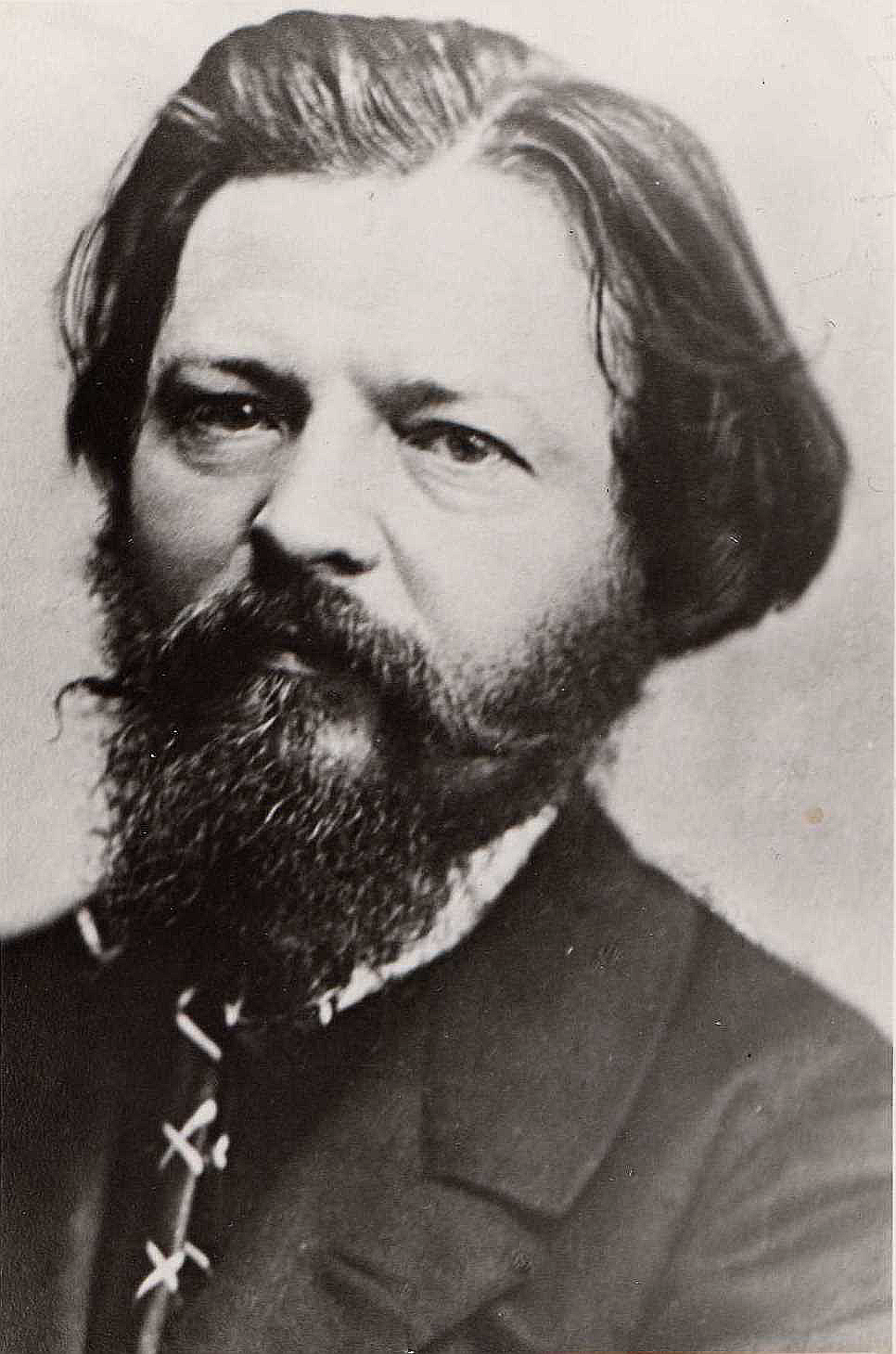
- Carl Wenig during the 1870s, photograph
- Born: February 14, 1830; Revel, Governorate of Estonia, Russian Empire
- Died: January 24, 1908 (aged 77); Saint Petersburg, Russian Empire
- Resting place: Novodevichy Cemetery, Saint Petersburg
- Education: Fyodor Bruni
- Alma mater: Imperial Academy of Arts (1853)
- Known for: Painting
- Style: Academism
- Spouse: Marianna Venetonni
- Children: 5, including Paul
- Relatives: Bogdan Wenig (younger brother); Peter Carl Fabergé (maternal cousin)
- Awards: Big Gold Medal of the Imperial Academy of Arts (1853)
- Elected: Member Academy of Arts (1860); Professor by rank (1862)

Carl Gottlieb Wenig, russified as Carl Bogdanovich Wenig (26 February 1830 – 6 February 1908) was a Baltic German painter in the Academical style, active in St. Petersburg during Tsars Alexander II and Alexander III's reigns, known for his history pictures. The elder brother to fellow painter Bogdan Wenig and, alongside the latter, an in-law to the Fabergé family, he served as professor at the Imperial Academy of Arts.

== Biography ==
His father, Gottlieb (1804–1874), was a music teacher and organist at St. Nicholas' Church in Reval (now Tallinn). His mother, Agathe (1808–1895), was an amateur artist and the aunt of Peter Carl Fabergé. From 1844 to 1853, he studied at the Imperial Academy of Arts with Fyodor Bruni. During his time there, he won several medals, including a gold medal for his depiction of Esther before Ahasuerus. Upon graduating, he was awarded a stipend that enabled him to continue his studies in Rome, where he remained for six years.

In 1860, he was elected an Imperial Academician for his painting "The Entombment". Two years later, he was elected an Imperial Professor for his painting of two angels announcing the destruction of Sodom. He began to teach drawing at the Academy that same year.

In 1869, he became an Associate Professor and was promoted to a fully tenured Professor of the second-degree in 1876. He was advanced to the first-degree in 1888. After 1871, he served as a member of the Academy's governing board. In addition to his canvases, he created several decorative murals and icons at the Cathedral of Christ the Saviour in Moscow and St. Nicholas Church in his native city.

His brothers, Bogdan (1837–1872) and Pyotr (1849–1888) also became painters.

== Selected paintings ==
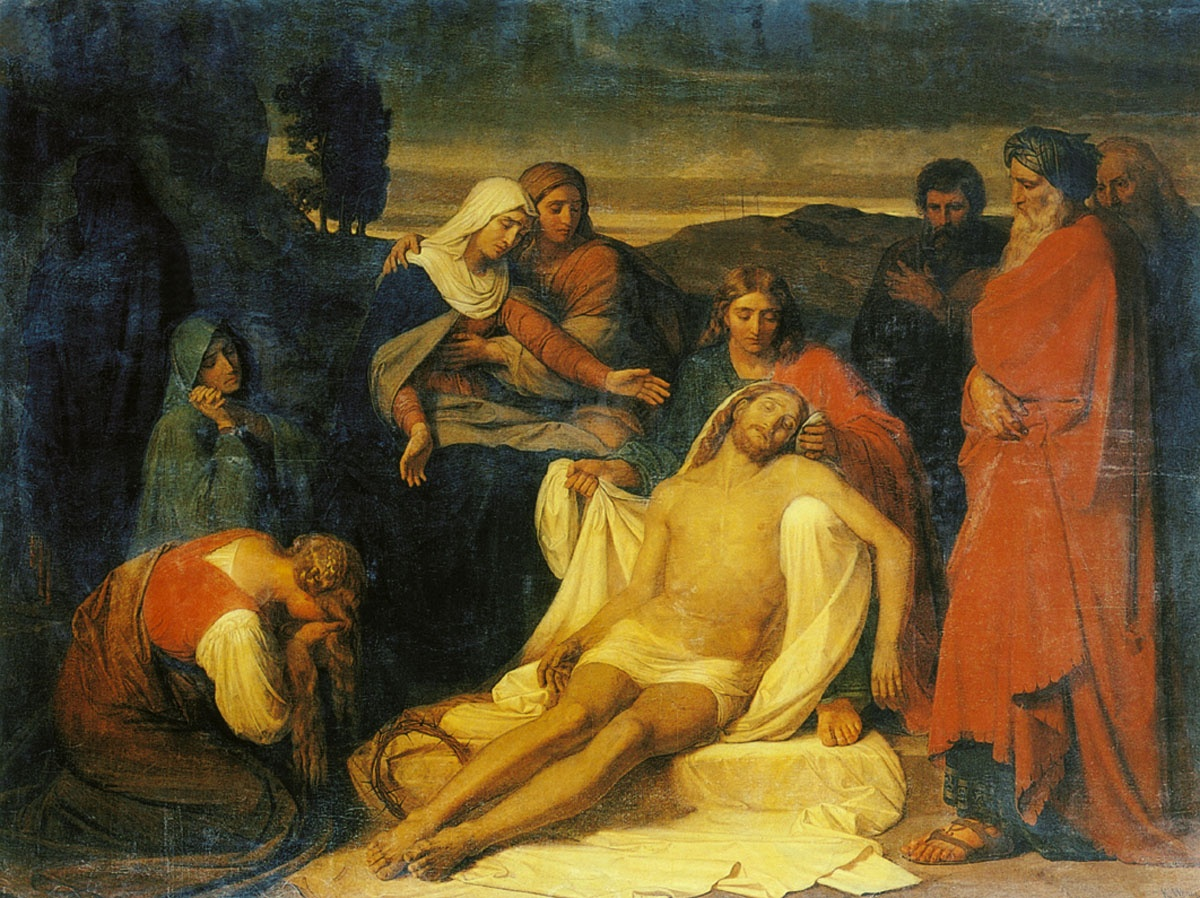
Burial of Jesus, 1859; Russian Museum, St. Petersburg

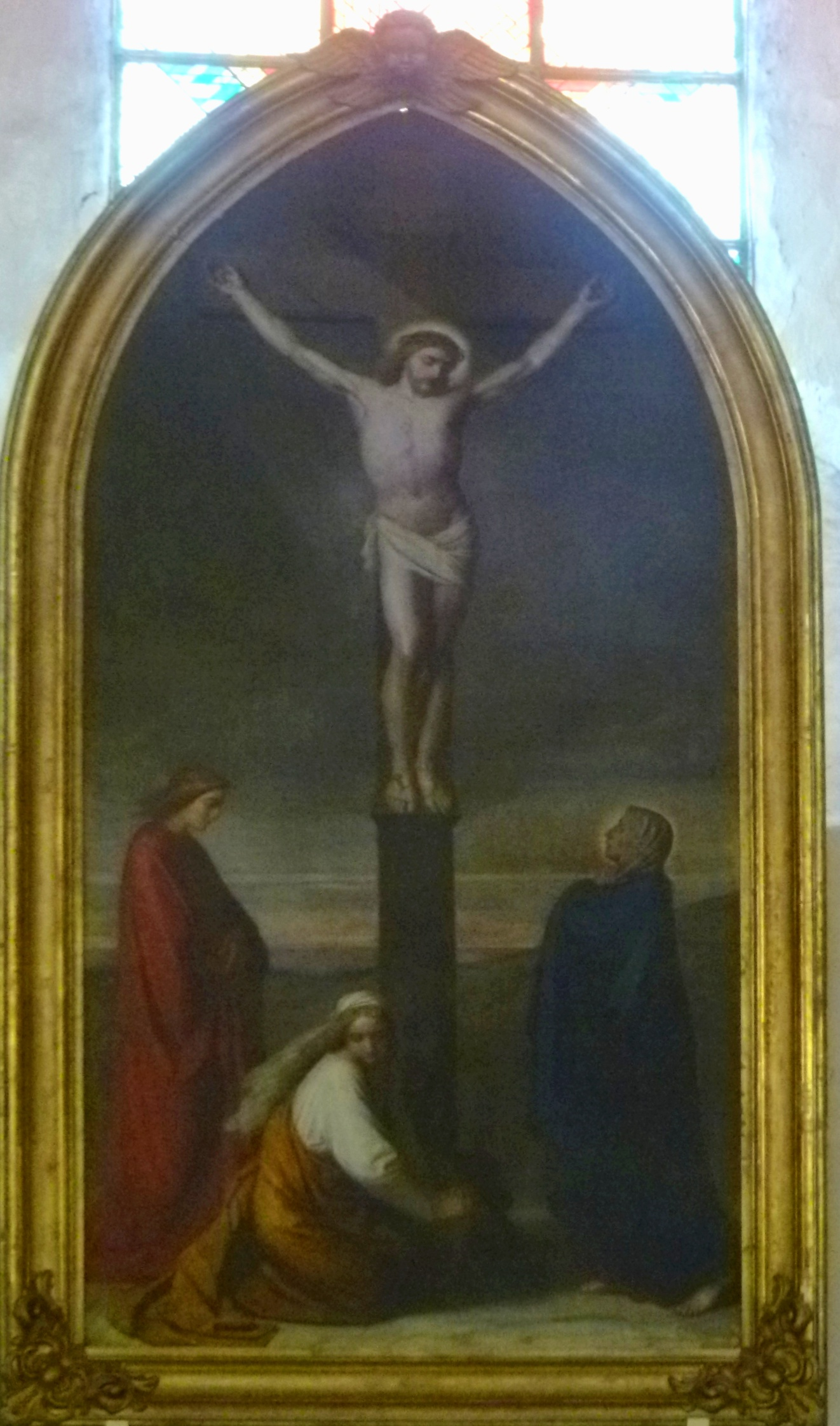
Crucifixion of Jesus, 1863; St. Nicholas Church, Tallinn

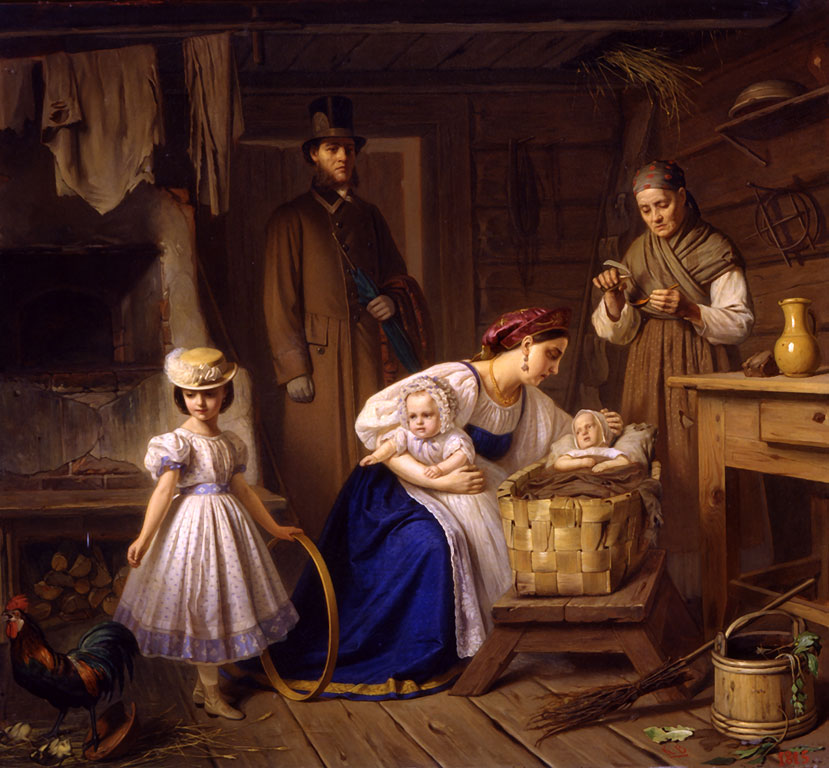
Nurse Visiting a Sick Child, 1860s; Radishchev Museum, Saratov

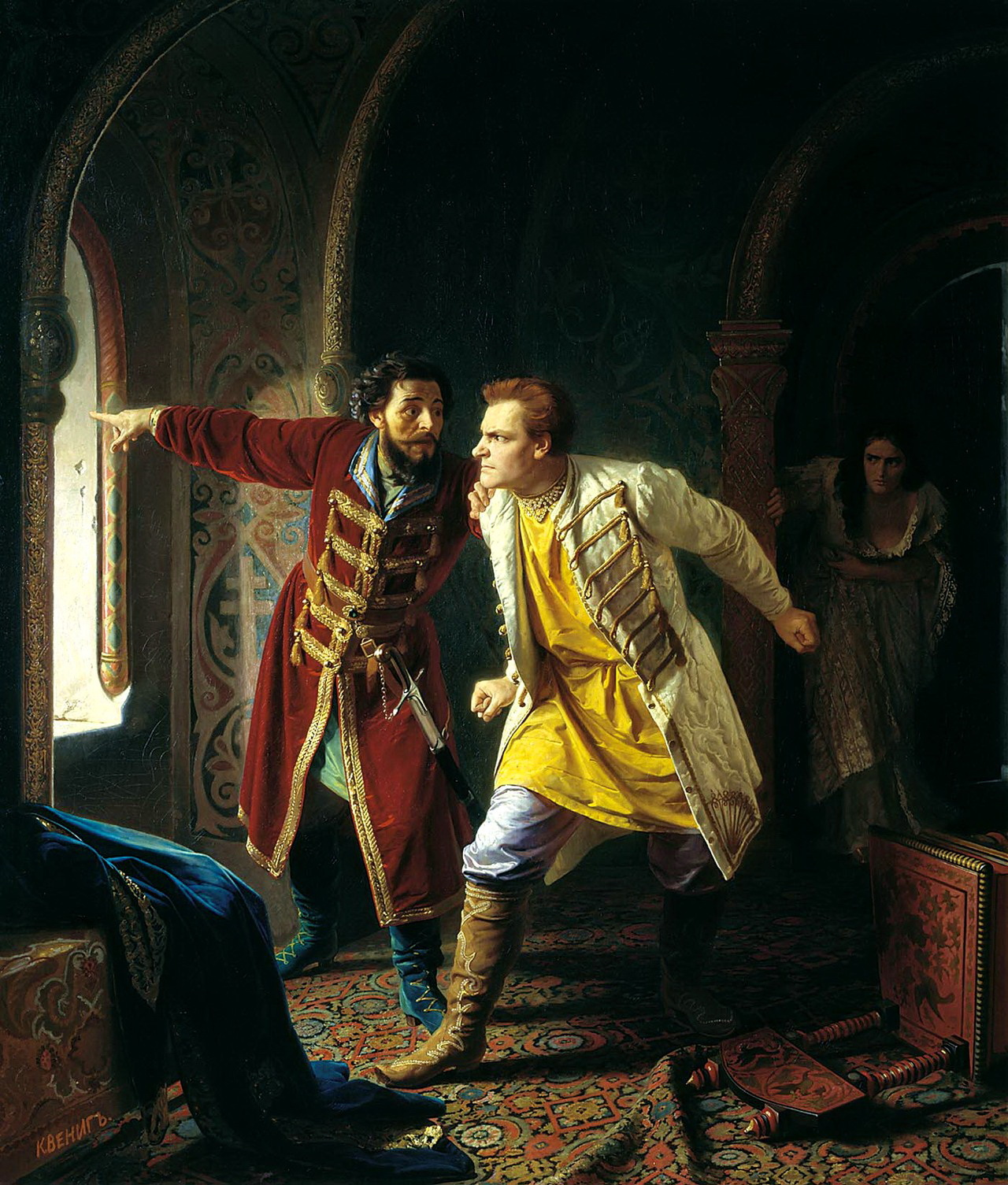
Last Minutes of False Dmitri, 1879; Art Museum of Nizhny Novgorod

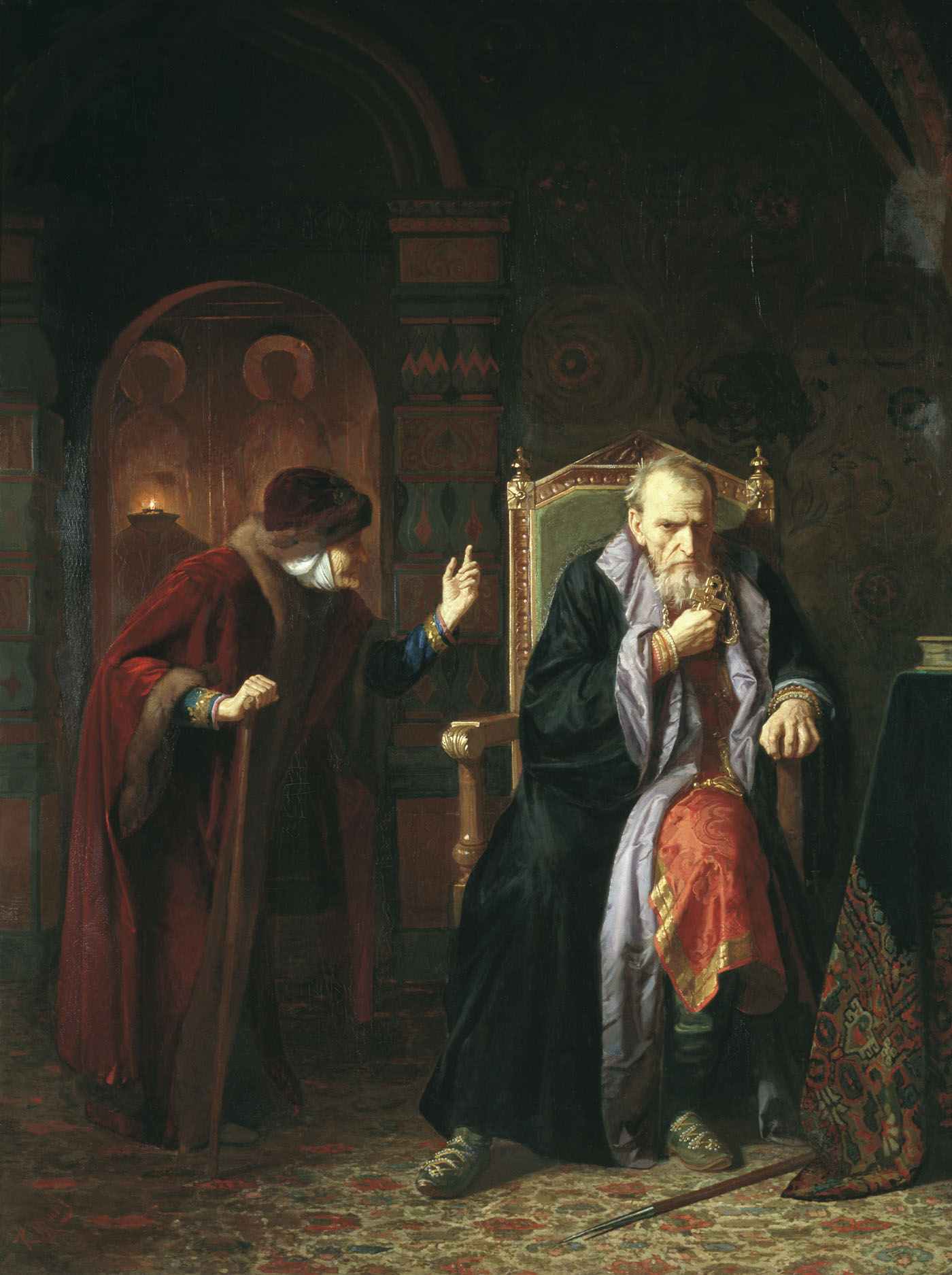
Ivan the Terrible and His Nanny, 1886; Kharkiv Art Museum

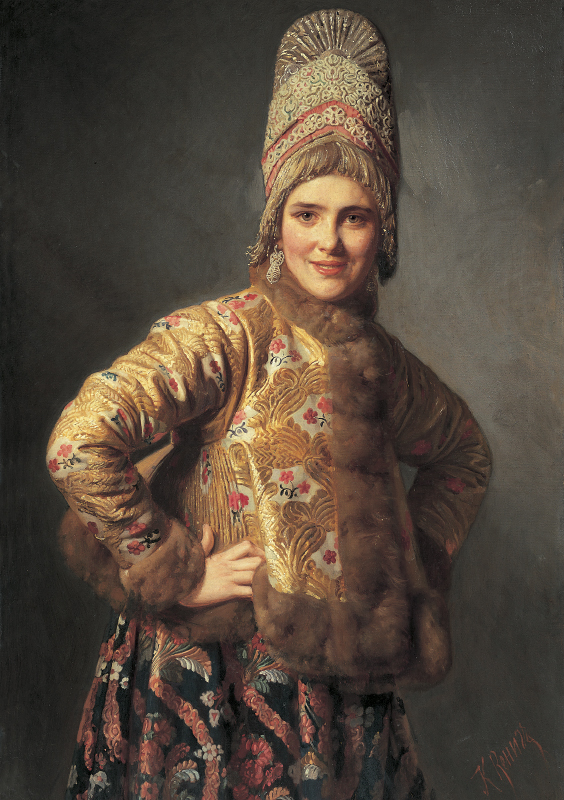
Russian Girl in Folk Costume, 1889; Russian Museum, St. Petersburg

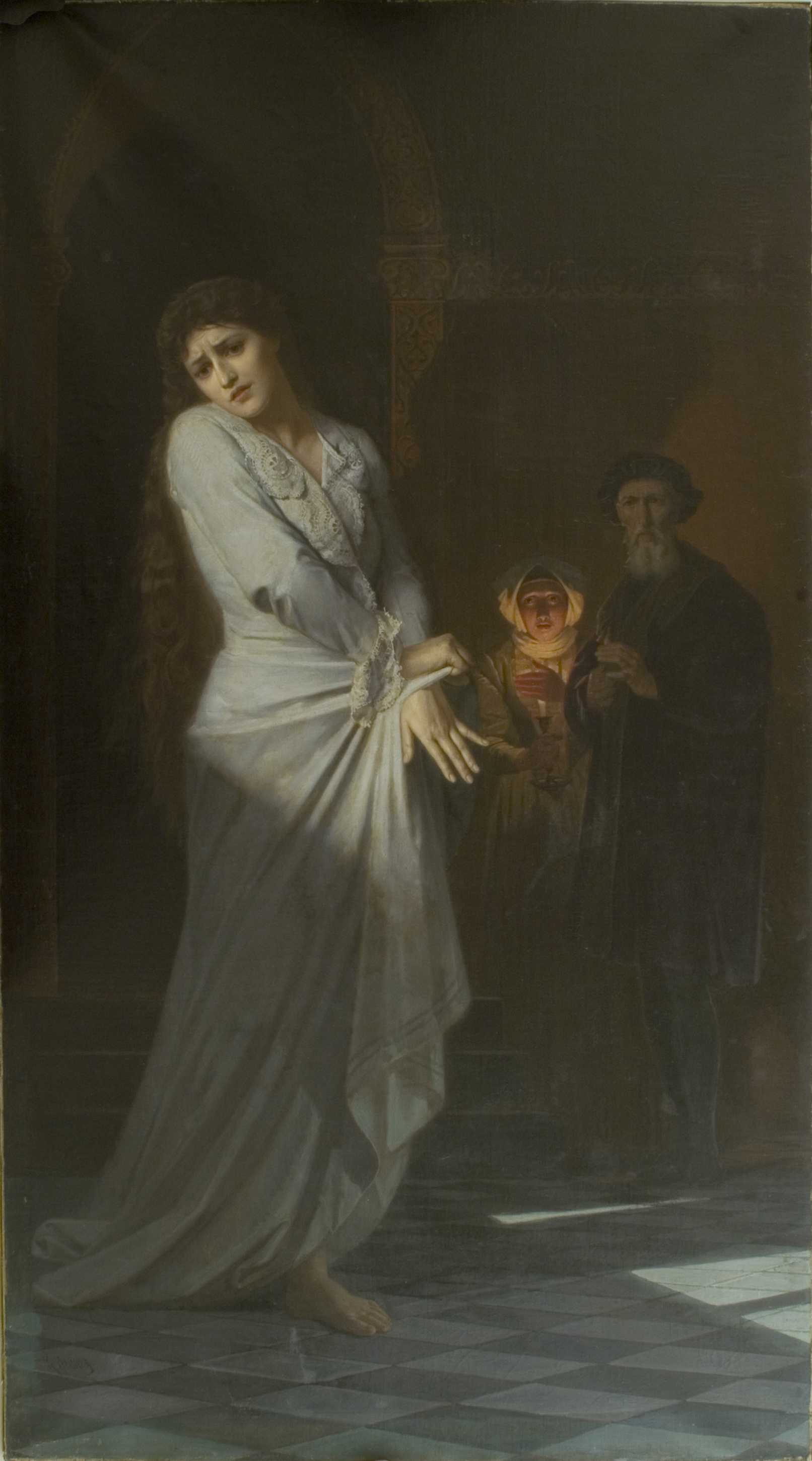
Lady Macbeth, c. 1891; Picture Gallery, Narva

== Sources ==
- "Вениг, Карл Богданович" . Brockhaus and Efron Encyclopedic Dictionary (in Russian). 1906.
- Kondakov, Sergei N. [in Russian] (1915). Юбилейный справочник Императорской Академии художеств. 1764–1914 (in Russian). Vol. 2. Saint Petersburg: Golike and Vilborg. p. 36. OCLC 707072219.
