= Bogdan Wenig =

Russian Baltic German painter

- Богдан Вениг
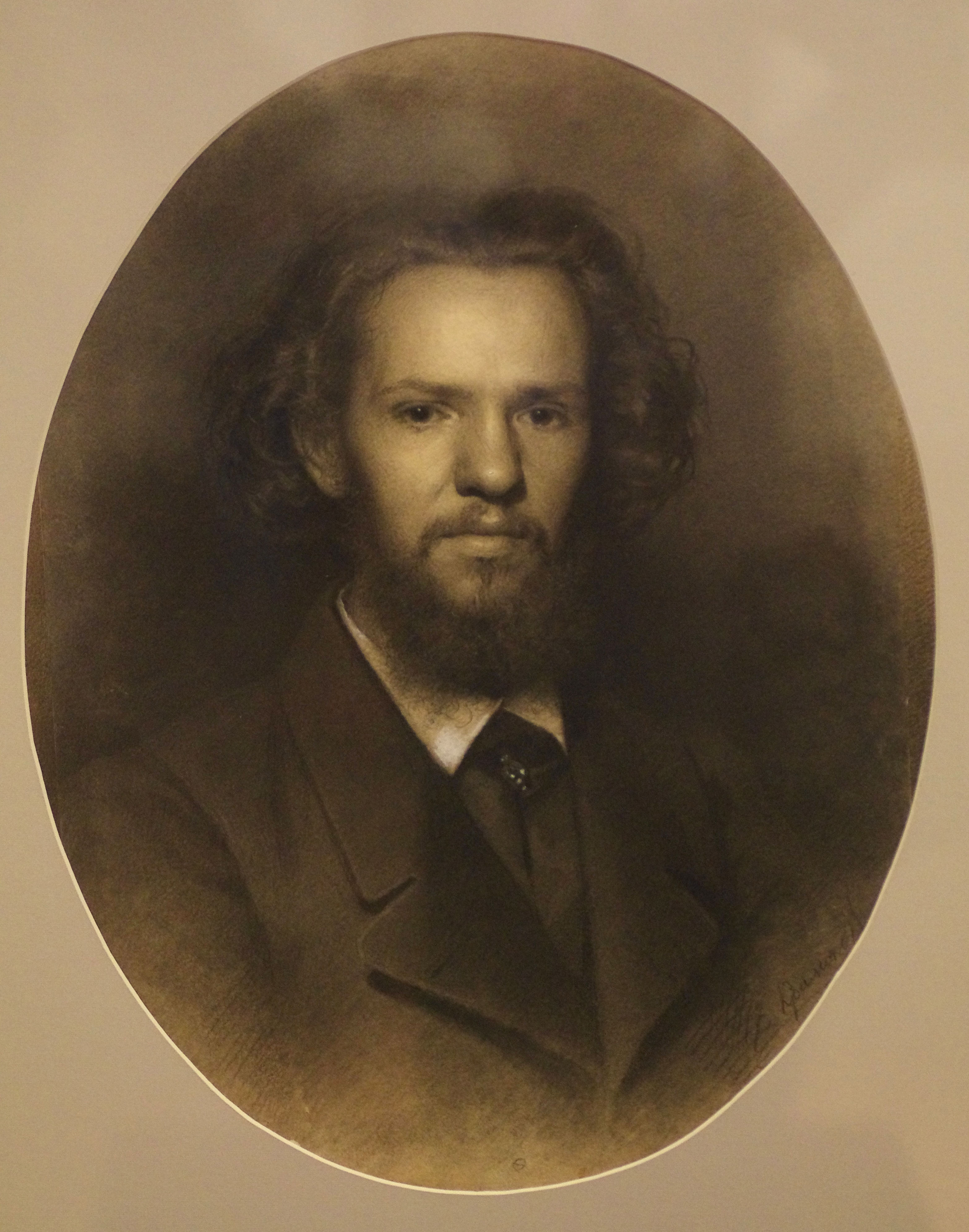
- Portrait drawing by Ivan Kramskoi, 1861, chalks on paper; Tretyakov Gallery, Moscow
- Born: Johann Gottlieb Wenig; July 30, 1837; Reval, Governorate of Estonia, Russian Empire
- Died: May 13, 1872 (aged 34); Saint Petersburg, Russian Empire
- Resting place: Volkovo Cemetery, St. Petersburg
- Education: Fyodor Bruni
- Alma mater: Imperial Academy of Arts (1864)
- Known for: painting
- Style: Academism; Realism
- Spouse: Katharina Nummelin (m. 1866)
- Children: 3
- Relatives: Carl Wenig (elder brother); Peter Carl Fabergé (maternal cousin)

Johann Gottlieb Wenig, (Note: Russian: Иога́нн Го́тлиб Ве́ниг, Богда́н Богда́нович Ве́ниг.) russified as Bogdan Bogdanovich Wenig (30 July 1837 – 13 May 1872) was a Baltic German painter in the Academical style, active in Saint Petersburg during Tsar Alexander II's reign. The younger brother to fellow painter Carl Wenig, he was a second-rate master most remembered among the fourteen protestants led by Ivan Kramskoi into leaving the Imperial Academy of Arts and establishing the Artel of Artists in 1863.

== Biography ==
His father, Gottlieb (1804–1874), was a music teacher and organist at St. Nicholas Church in Reval. His mother Agathe (1808–1895), an amateur artist, was the aunt of Peter Carl Fabergé. In 1848, he and his family moved to Saint Petersburg, where his father had found employment with the Directorate of the Imperial Theatres. In 1851, he joined his brother Carl at the Imperial Academy of Arts, studying historical painting with Fyodor Bruni.

He was especially noted for his draftsmanship; receiving three small silver medals (1854, 1856, 1857), two large silver medals (1856, 1857), and a small gold medal (1859); in addition to these, he was rewarded a prize for his sketch depicting the Kiss of Judas (1862).

In 1863, he was one of the artists involved in the "Revolt of the Fourteen"; refusing to participate in the 100th anniversary competition for a large gold medal. From then, he was a member of the Artel of Artists, led by Ivan Kramskoi.

He formally graduated from the Imperial Academy in 1864 with the title of "Artist 2nd Class". In 1865, together with Kramskoi and Nikolay Koshelev, he worked on painting the main dome at the Cathedral of Christ the Savior. This work aside, he mostly had his recognition as portrait painter. He died in St. Petersburg, aged thirty-four; he was interred into the Volkovo Cemetery.

== Gallery ==
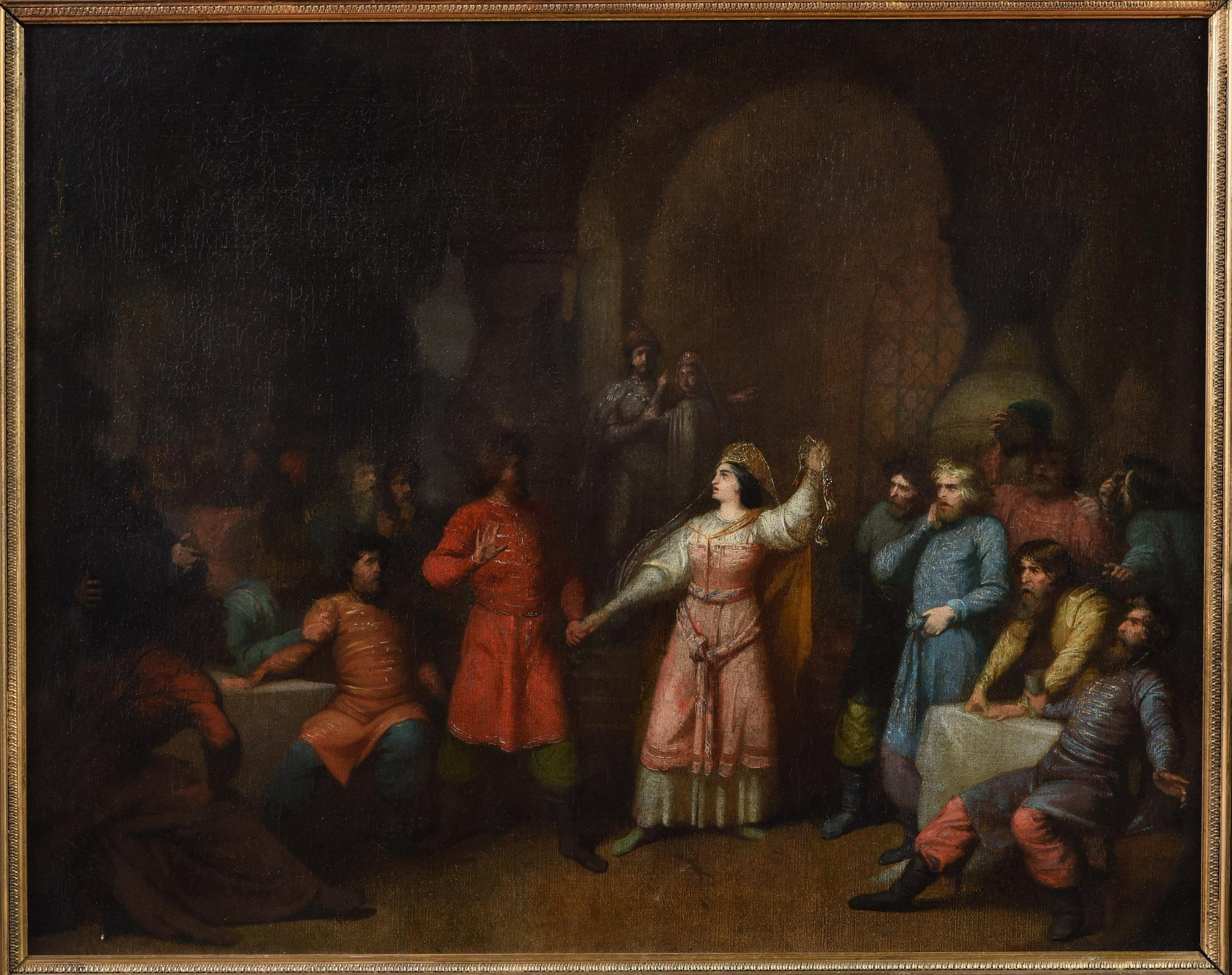
Sophia of Lithuania at Vasily II of Moscow's Wedding, 1861, oil on canvas, 62,5 by 77,5 cm; Museum of the Academy of Arts, St. Petersburg

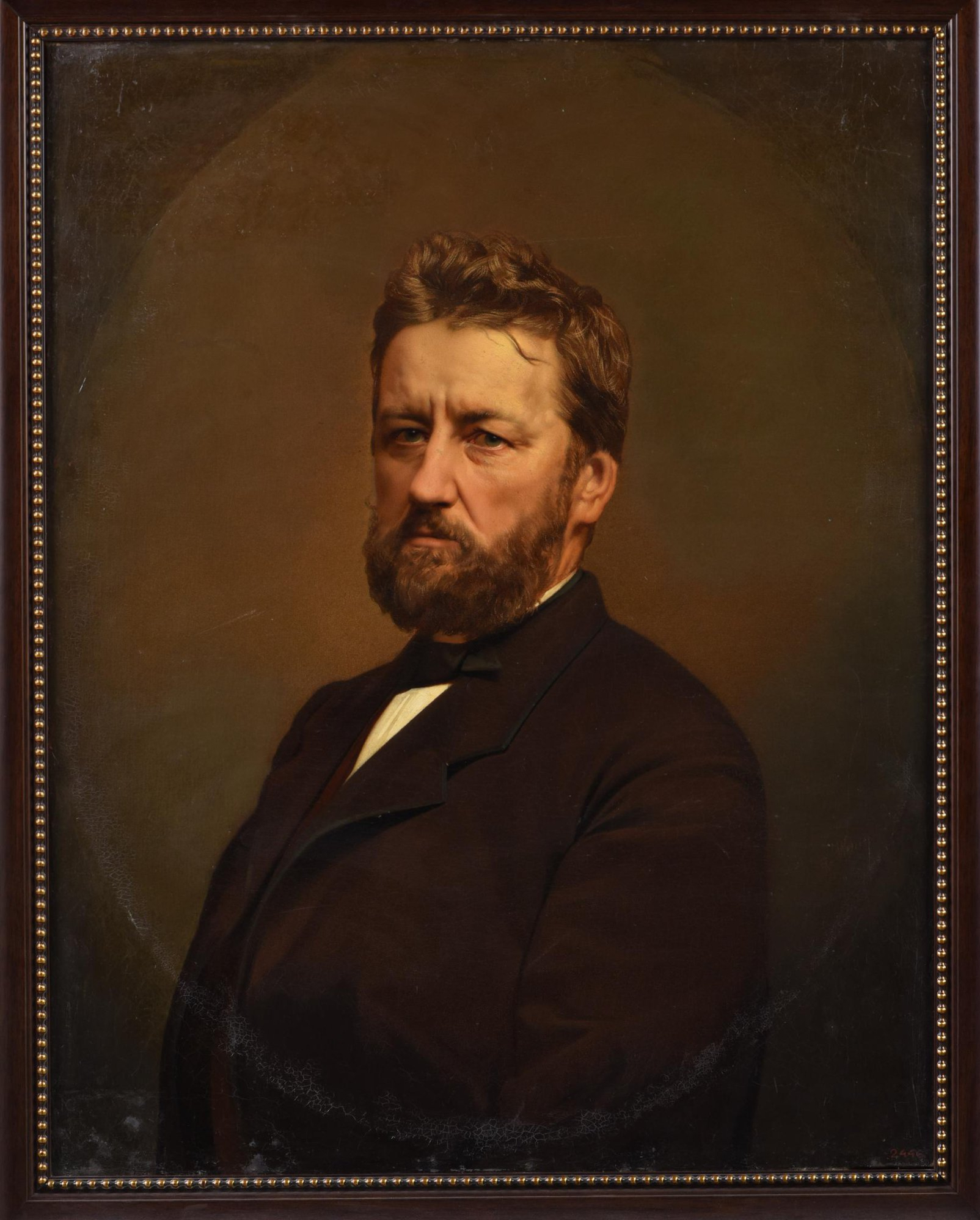
Johann Reimers, after photograph by Andrey Denyer, 1869, oil on canvas, 73 by 58 cm; Museum of the Academy of Arts, St. Petersburg
