= Ivan Tarkhanov (painter) =

Russian painter

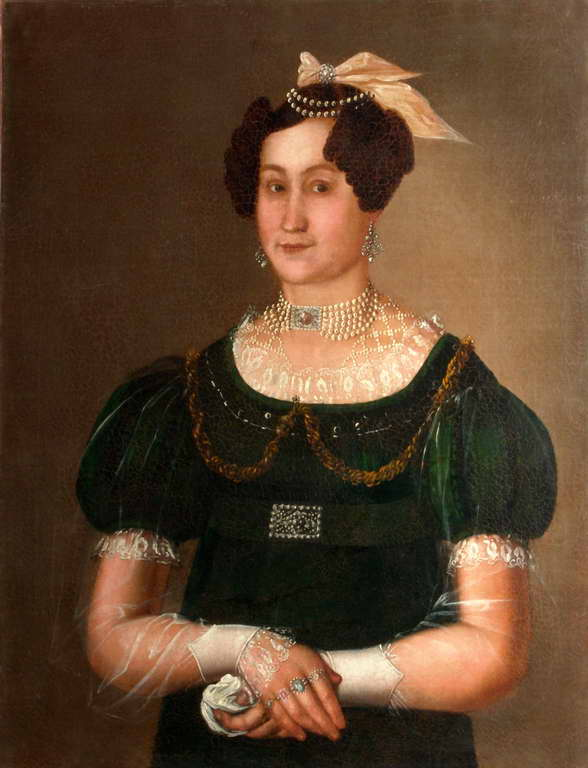
Portrait of Yevdokhia Dmitrievna Surina, 1829

Ivan Vasilievich Tarkhanov (1780–1848) was a Russian painter active during the nineteenth century. He was known for his provincial portraiture, with examples of his work appearing in a joint 2006 Hermitage Museum and Kaliningrad State Art Gallery exhibition on early 19th century portrait art. Two of his portraits, dated 1831, are currently held in the Yaroslavl Art Museum in Yaroslavl. The inscriptions on the back of both works, however, identify him as a registering clerk and resident of Uglich. Nothing further is known about his life. A further collection of his paintings may be found at the Uglich Museum-Preserve.
