= Aleksander Gine =

Russian painter

Alexander Vasilievich Gine (Russian: Александр Васильевич Гине; 1830 – June 3, 1880) was a Russian painter.

== Biography ==
Alexander Gine came from a noble family. He studied at the Kazan Gymnasium, together with Ivan Shishkin. From 1854 to 1856, the artist studied at the Moscow School of Painting, Sculpture and Architecture under Sokrat Vorobyov.

Gine died on the night of June 3, 1880 in St. Petersburg in extreme poverty and was buried at the Malookhtinsky cemetery. His artworks are in public museum collections, including the Tretyakov Gallery, the Pushkin Museum, and the State Russian Museum.

== Gallery ==
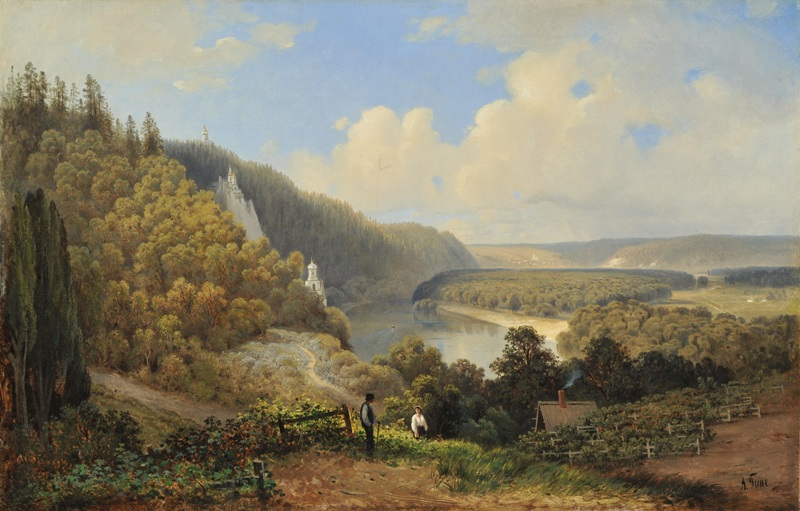

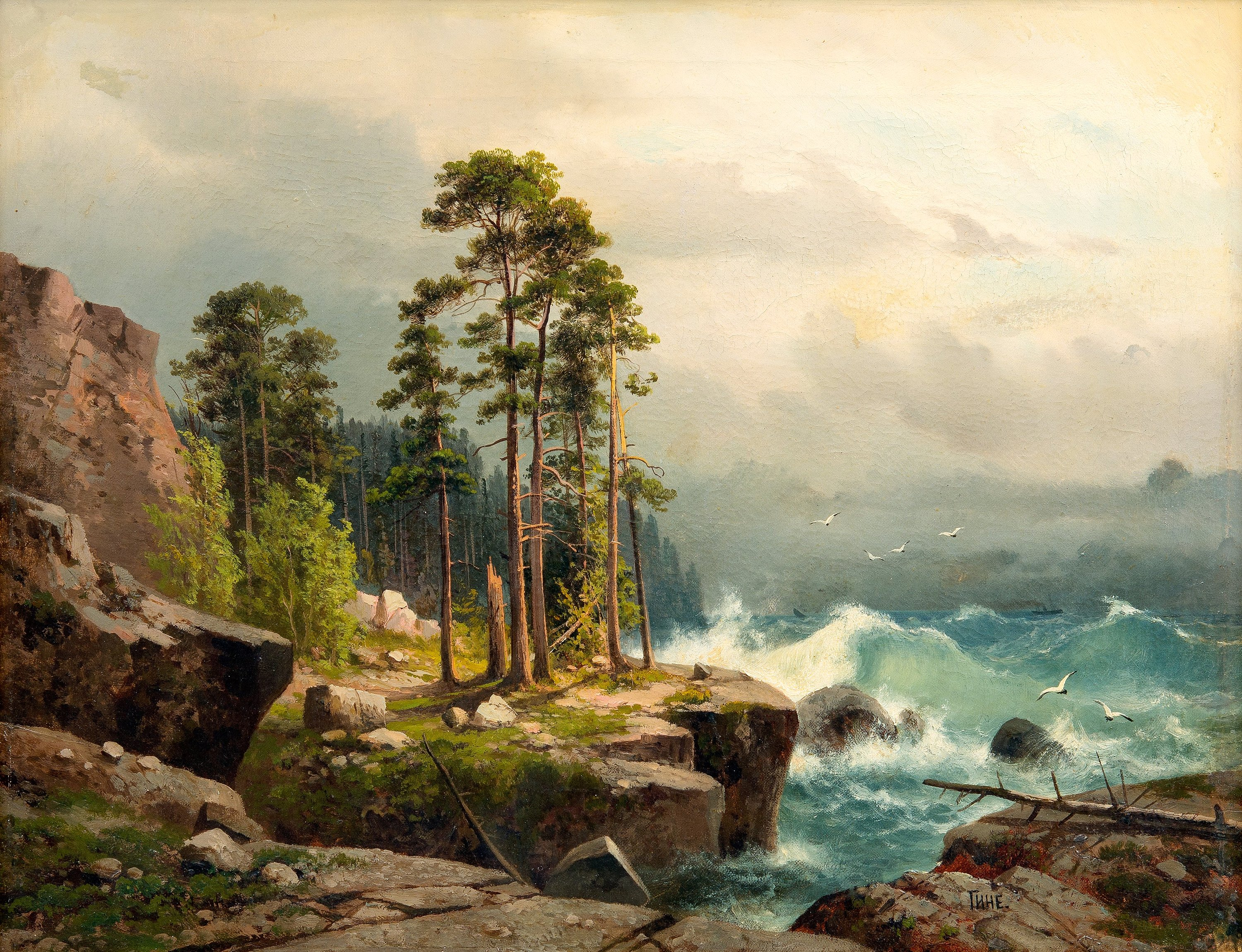
