= Nikolai Fedoseev =

Early Marxist theorist in Russia (1871-1898)

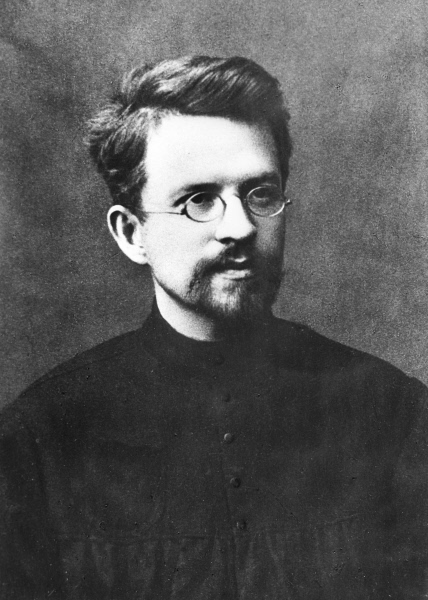
Nikolai Fedoseev in 1895

Nikolai Yevgrafovich Fedoseyev (Russian: Николай Евгрáфович Федосéев; May 9 1871, [O.S. 27 April] Nolinsk – July 4 [O.S. 22 June] 1898, Verkhoyansk) was a pioneer of Marxism in the Russian Empire.

Fedoseyev started studying the works of Karl Marx in the late 1880s, and he was expelled from the Kazan Gymnasium in December 1887. In 1888, Fedoseyev founded a Marxist study group. He is credited with teaching the basics of Marxist theory to Maxim Gorky. In 1889, Fedoseyev was arrested for having organized an illegal printing press. In 1892, he was arrested again for organizing a factory strike against the Morozov family. While incarcerated, he corresponded regularly with Vladimir Lenin to discuss Marxist theory. In 1895, the exiled Fedoseyev corresponded with Leo Tolstoy over their shared interest in the ongoing religious persecution of the Doukhobors. In 1898, Fedoseyev was accused of embezzling party funds and shamed. He committed suicide later that year.

== Career ==
Fedoseyev was born in Nolinsk, in Vyatka province, the son of a detective. He studied at Kazan Gymnasium, where he became interested in social science, and began studying the writings of Karl Marx, at a time where there were no organised Marxist groups anywhere in the Russian Empire. On 5 December 1887, he was expelled from the gymnasium for 'political unreliability'.

According to Soviet historiography, Vladimir Ulyanov, later known as Lenin, became a member of Fedoseyev Marxist circles in the late 1880s, through which he supposedly discovered Karl Marx's 1867 book Capital. However, it was not until 1888 that Fedoseyev founded a Marxist study group, at which time Lenin, who had previously been a first year student at Kazan University, had already left the city. This meant that Lenin and Fedoseyev did not meet. By Lenin's own omission:

I heard about Fedoseyev while I was in Kazan, but I never met him.

Therefore, it is likely that this claim was fabricated by later Soviet officials, who were eager to exaggerate Lenin's early involvement with Marxism and downplay the influence of other socialist currents on his thought.

However, Lenin did praise Fedoseyev for his contributions to Russian Marxism. In 1922, he wrote:

Fedoseyev played a very important role in the Volga area and in certain parts of Central Russia during that period; and the turn towards Marxism at that time was, undoubtedly, very largely due to the influence of this exceptionally talented and exceptionally devoted revolutionary.

Fedoseyev also influenced the young itinerant baker, Aleksei Peshkov, who was later a world famous writer, under the name Maxim Gorky. In his memoirs, Gorky recalled being invited to a secret meeting organised by Fedoseyev, to listen to a reading of Our Differences by Georgi Plekhanov, the founder of Russian Marxism. The reading was interrupted by barracking from the audience, who objected to Plekhanov's criticism of Russian populism, one of whom suggested that it was an insult to the memory of Lenin's older brother, Aleksandr Ulyanov, who been hanged for plotting to assassinate Alexander III of Russia. Afterwards, Peshkov was taken aside by Fedoseyev, who taught him the basics of Marxist theory. Gorky later wrote:

I had already heard of Fedoseyev, and of the circle he had organised - a very serious-minded group of young people; and I was attracted by his deep eyes, by his pale nervous face [...] He asked about my life: whether I had acquaintances among working people; what books I had read; how much free time I had.

In June 1889, the police discovered an illegal printing press that Fedoseyev had organised. He was arrested on 13 July, and was held in custody for 15 months, then sentenced to a year and three months in solitary confinement. In January 1892, he settled in Vladimir, made contact with other Marxists, and helped organise a strike in a factory owned by the Morozov family. Arrested again on 10 September 1892, he and Lenin exchanged letters while he was in Vladimir prison, in which they discussed Marxist theory. According to historian Ralph Fox, he was "in some way perhaps the teacher to Lenin". Lenin travelled to Vladimir, hoping to meet him when he escaped from prison, but the planned escape did not come off.

In September 1893, Fedoseyev was released pending trial because of ill health. In November he was sentenced to three years exile in Solvychegodsk in northern Russia. He was arrested again in July 1895 for maintaining contact with Marxists in Vladimir, and sentenced to five years exile in Verkholensk in Siberia. On his journey to Siberia, he came into contact with Doukhobors, religious dissenters who were persecuted for refusing to do military service. He wrote to Leo Tolstoy, author of War and Peace, who had taken up the Doukhobors' cause, describing the plight of the exiles. Three of his letters to Tolstoy survived.

Fedoseyev travelled part of the journey to Siberia with two peasants named P. V. Olkovik and Kirill Sereda—Tolstoyans exiled for refusing to do military service. Fedoseyev was accused of "uncomradely relations" with the two. The accusation was heard on 5 January 1898 by the United Assembly of Political Exiles, who found that there was "not a shadow of suspicion" that his relations with them were anything but "friendly". He was also accused of embezzling party funds which resulted in shame and a switch to an austere lifestyle that eventually led to his suicide.
