= Ivan Shishkin =

Russian landscape painter (1832–1898)

- Иван Шишкин
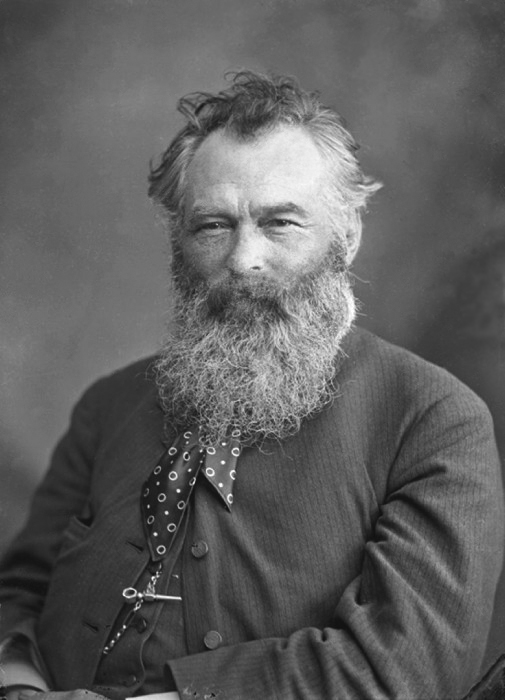
- Shishkin in the 1890s
- Born: 25 January 1832; Yelabuga, Vyatka Governorate, Russia
- Died: 20 March 1898 (aged 66); St. Petersburg, Russia
- Resting place: Tikhvin Cemetery, St. Petersburg
- Education: Moscow School of Painting, Sculpture and Architecture (1856); Imperial Academy of Arts (1860)
- Known for: Landscape painting
- Notable work: Morning in a Pine Forest (with Konstantin Savitsky, 1889); A Rye Field (1878)
- Movement: Realism, Peredvizhniki
- Spouse(s): Yevgeniya Vasilyeva (m. 1868; died 1874) Olga Lagoda (m. 1880; died 1881)
- Awards: Silver Medal (1858); Minor Golden Medal (1859); Grand Golden Medal (1860)
- Elected: Member Academy of Arts (1865); Professor by rank (1873)
- Patrons: Pavel Tretyakov

Ivan Ivanovich Shishkin (Russian: Иван Иванович Шишкин; 25 January [O.S. 13 January] 1832 – 20 March [O.S. 8 March] 1898) was a Russian Realist painter and draughtsman, best known for his landscape subjects. One of the most notable artisans to emerge during Tsar Alexander II's reign, he was among founding members of the Peredvizhniki company.

== Biography ==
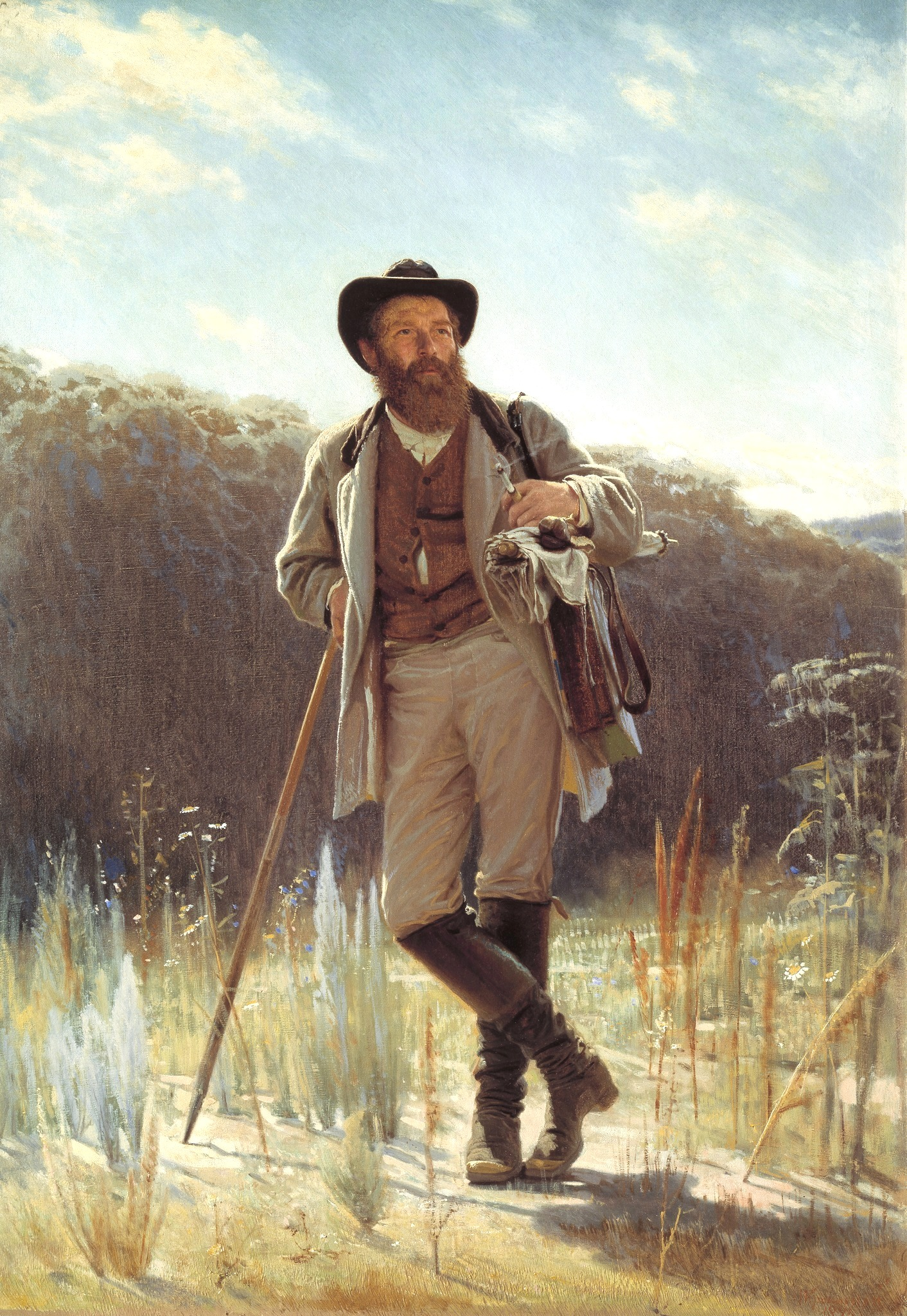
Portrait of Shishkin by Ivan Kramskoi (1873)

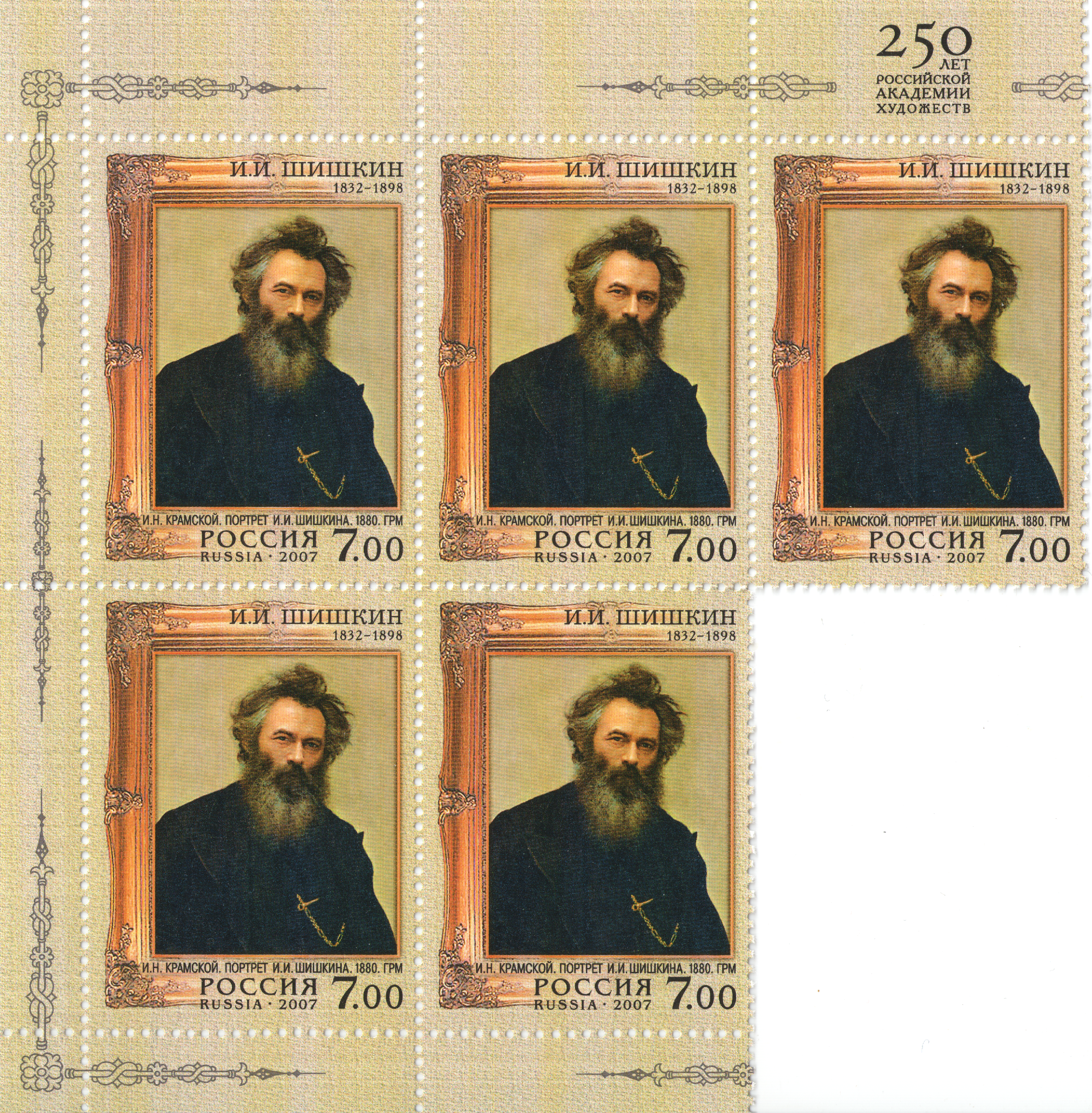
Russian stamps with the portrait of Shishkin

Shishkin was born in Yelabuga, Vyatka Governorate (today Republic of Tatarstan). He came from a family of Yelabuga merchants and was the son of grain merchant Ivan Vasilyevich Shishkin (1792–1872). The artist’s grandfather, Vasily Afanasyevich Shishkin-Serebryakov (1764–1827), was a palace peasant who registered as a third-guild merchant in Yelabuga in 1792.

=== Artistic training ===
At the age of 12 Shishkin was enrolled in the First Kazan Boys' Gymnasium but after five years of study he returned home to Yelabuga, where he lived for four years. In 1852 he entered the Moscow School of Painting, Sculpture and Architecture, where he studied for four years until 1856. After completing his course, he continued his education at the Saint Petersburg Imperial Academy of Arts from 1857 to 1860, where he became a student of the landscape painter Professor Sokrat Vorobyov.

At the Academy Shishkin formed a close friendship with his classmates and like-minded artists Aleksander Gine and Jogin Pavel. In 1857 they worked together in Dubki, a small settlement on the shore of the Gulf of Finland near Sestroretsk. In the following years they traveled together to Valaam Island on Lake Ladoga, home to its famous monastery. Those trips helped Shishkin refine his skills in depicting nature, allowing him to render landscapes accurately with both brush and pencil.

During his first year at the Academy Shishkin was awarded two small silver medals: one for his painting View in the Vicinity of St Petersburg (1856) and another for drawings completed during the summer in Dubki. In 1858 he received a large silver medal for his study Pine on Valaam. In 1859 he was awarded a small gold medal for his landscape Gorge on Valaam and finally, in 1860, he earned the large gold medal for two paintings of the same title, View of Valaam Island. Kukko Area.

=== Travel abroad ===
In 1860 Shishkin, Gine and Jogin submitted a request to the Council of the Academy of Arts for financial assistance to publish their studies through lithography. The Council decided "to issue a monetary reward in the amount of 150 silver rubles for all three of them for the work they have undertaken on lithography experiments and to declare the gratitude of the Council to them, and to thank Mr Professor Vorobyov for the successes of his students."

Along with this final award Shishkin earned the right to travel abroad on a scholarship from the St Petersburg Imperial Academy of Arts. In 1861 he went to Munich, Germany, where he visited the studios of the famous artists Benno Adam and Franz Adam, who were highly regarded as animal painters. In 1863 Shishkin moved to Zurich, where, under the guidance of Professor Rudolf Koller—then considered one of the best animal painters—he sketched and painted animals from life. While in Zurich he also experimented for the first time with etching using aqua regia.

From Zurich Shishkin traveled to Geneva, Switzerland, to study the works of François Diday and Alexandre Calame. In 1864–1865 he moved to Düsseldorf, where he attended the Düsseldorf Art Academy. While there he painted View in the Vicinity of Düsseldorf on commission for the collector N. Bykov. This painting earned him the title of academician from the Imperial Academy of Arts.

During his time abroad, in addition to painting, Shishkin worked extensively on pen drawings, which greatly impressed foreign audiences. Some of his drawings were displayed in the Düsseldorf Museum alongside works by renowned European masters such as Andreas Achenbach and Karl Friedrich Lessing.

=== Return to Russia ===
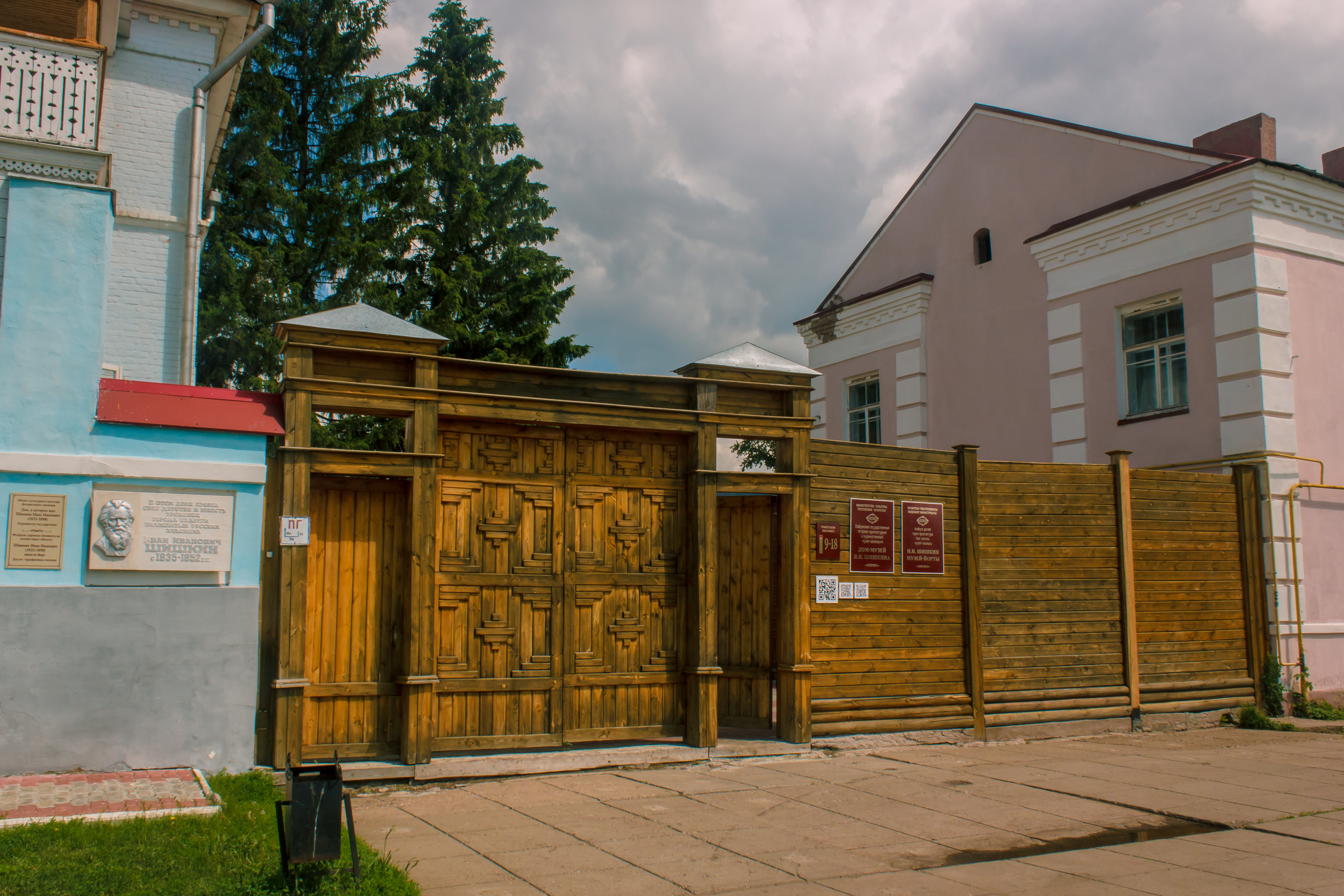
The house where Shishkin lived

Feeling homesick, Ivan Shishkin returned to St Petersburg in 1866 before the end of his scholarship term. That same year his painting Air and six drawings were exhibited in Moscow. From then on he frequently traveled across Russia for artistic purposes and exhibited his works at the Academy almost annually.

In 1868 the Academy of Arts awarded Shishkin the title of professor for his paintings Pine Forest and Instead of Crossing the Bridge, Let’s Find a Ford, but Grand Duchess Maria Nikolaevna, the Academy’s president, instead awarded him the Order of Saint Stanislaus, 3rd class. At the Exposition Universelle (1867) Shishkin exhibited several drawings and his painting View in the Vicinity of Düsseldorf.

With the establishment of the Peredvizhniki (The Society for Traveling Art Exhibitions) Shishkin began exhibiting his pen drawings at their exhibitions. Upon returning to Saint Petersburg in 1870 he became a member of the Circle of the Itinerants and Society of Russian Etchers in St Petersburg and resumed working with aqua regia etching, a technique he continued practicing for the rest of his life, dedicating almost as much time to it as to painting. These works further consolidated his reputation as one of Russia’s finest landscape painters and an unmatched master of etching.

He also took part in exhibitions at the Academy of Arts, the All-Russian Exhibition in Moscow (1882), the Nizhniy Novgorod (1896) and the World Fairs (Paris, 1867 and 1878 and Vienna, 1873).

Shishkin's painting method was based on analytical studies of nature. He became famous for his detailed and poetic forest landscapes, which captured the beauty of Russia’s wilderness. His works often depicted the changing seasons, wild nature, animals and birds. He was also an outstanding draftsman and printmaker.

Ivan Shishkin owned a dacha in the village of Vyra (now part of the Gatchina District, Leningrad Oblast), south of St Petersburg. There he painted some of his finest landscapes. His works are notable for poetic depiction of seasons in the woods, wild nature, animals and birds.

=== Final years ===
In 1873 the Academy of Arts officially awarded Shishkin the title of professor after purchasing his painting Forest Wilderness. In 1892 he was invited to become professor-director of the landscape painting workshop class in the Academy of Arts, but for various reasons he held the position only briefly.

In 1898 he completed his painting The Pine Grove and on March 20, 1898, Shishkin died suddenly of a heart attack in St Petersburg while sitting at his easel in front of a new painting. He was buried at the Smolensk Orthodox Cemetery. In 1950, his remains and tombstone were transferred to the Tikhvin Cemetery at the Necropolis of the Masters of Art.

A minor planet 3558 Shishkin, discovered by Soviet astronomer Lyudmila Zhuravlyova in 1978, was named in his honor.

== Gallery ==
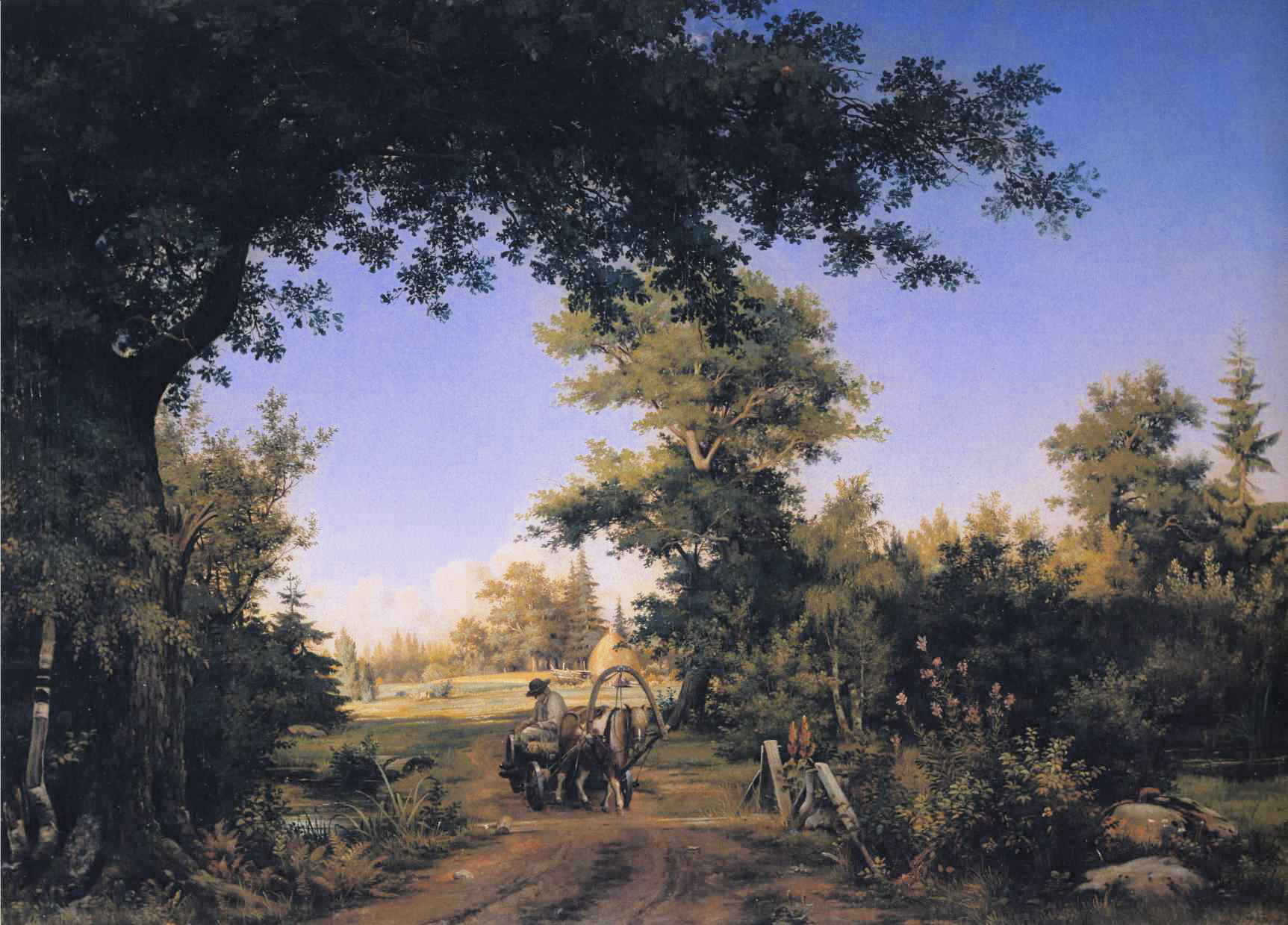
View on the Outskirts of St. Petersburg, 1856

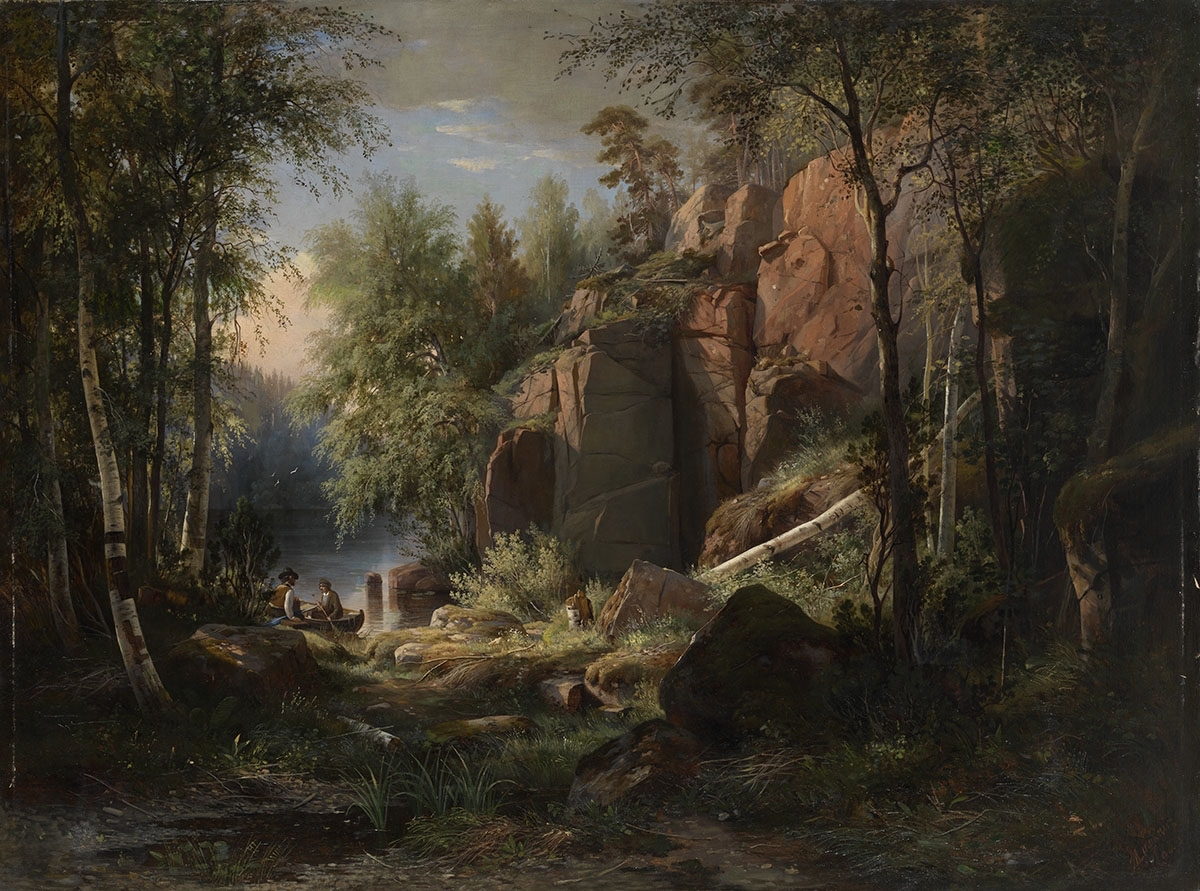
View of Valaam Island. Kukko, 1860

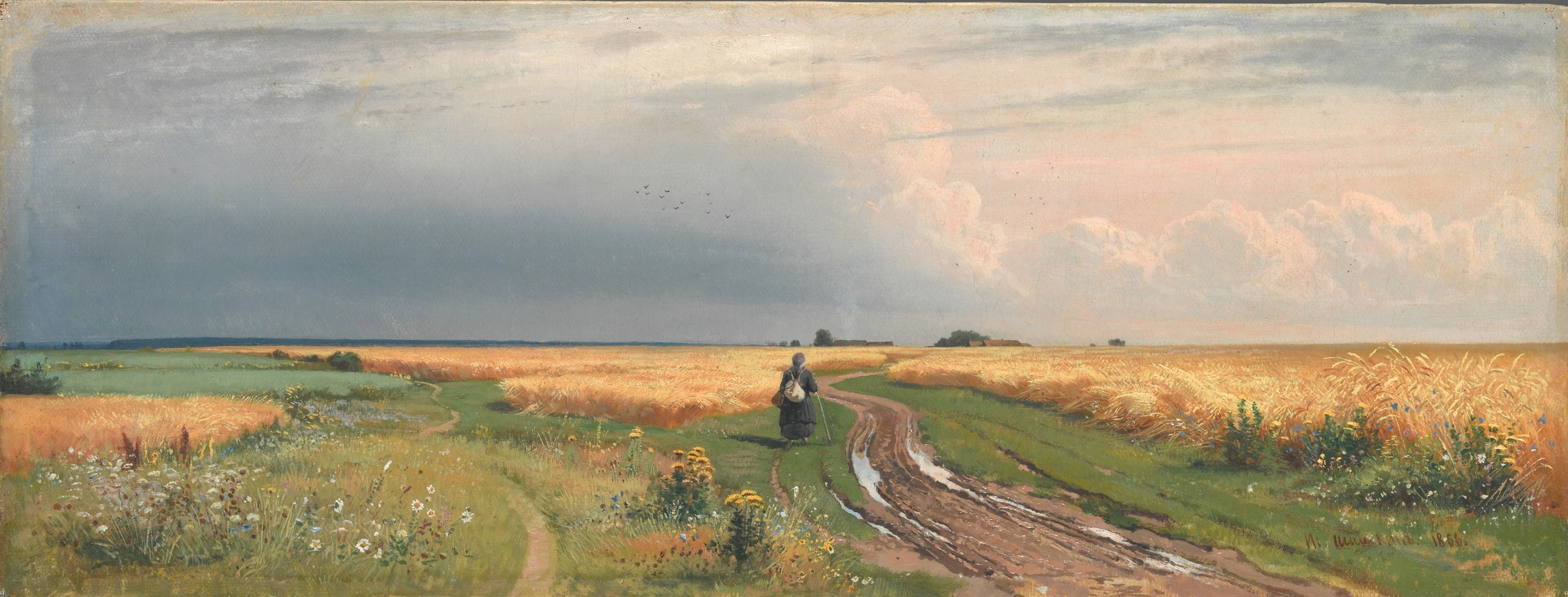
In the Rye, 1866

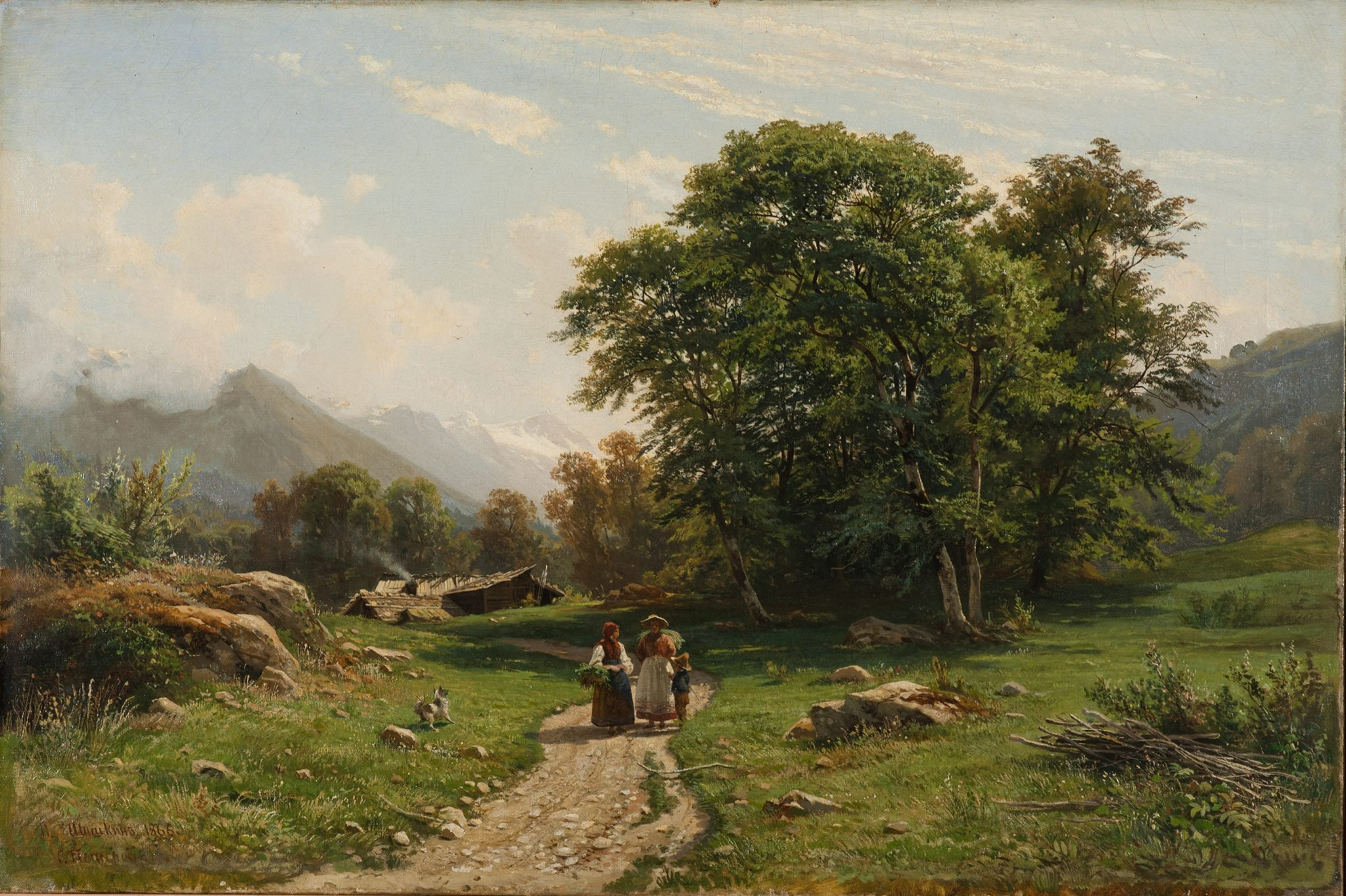
Swiss Landscape, 1866

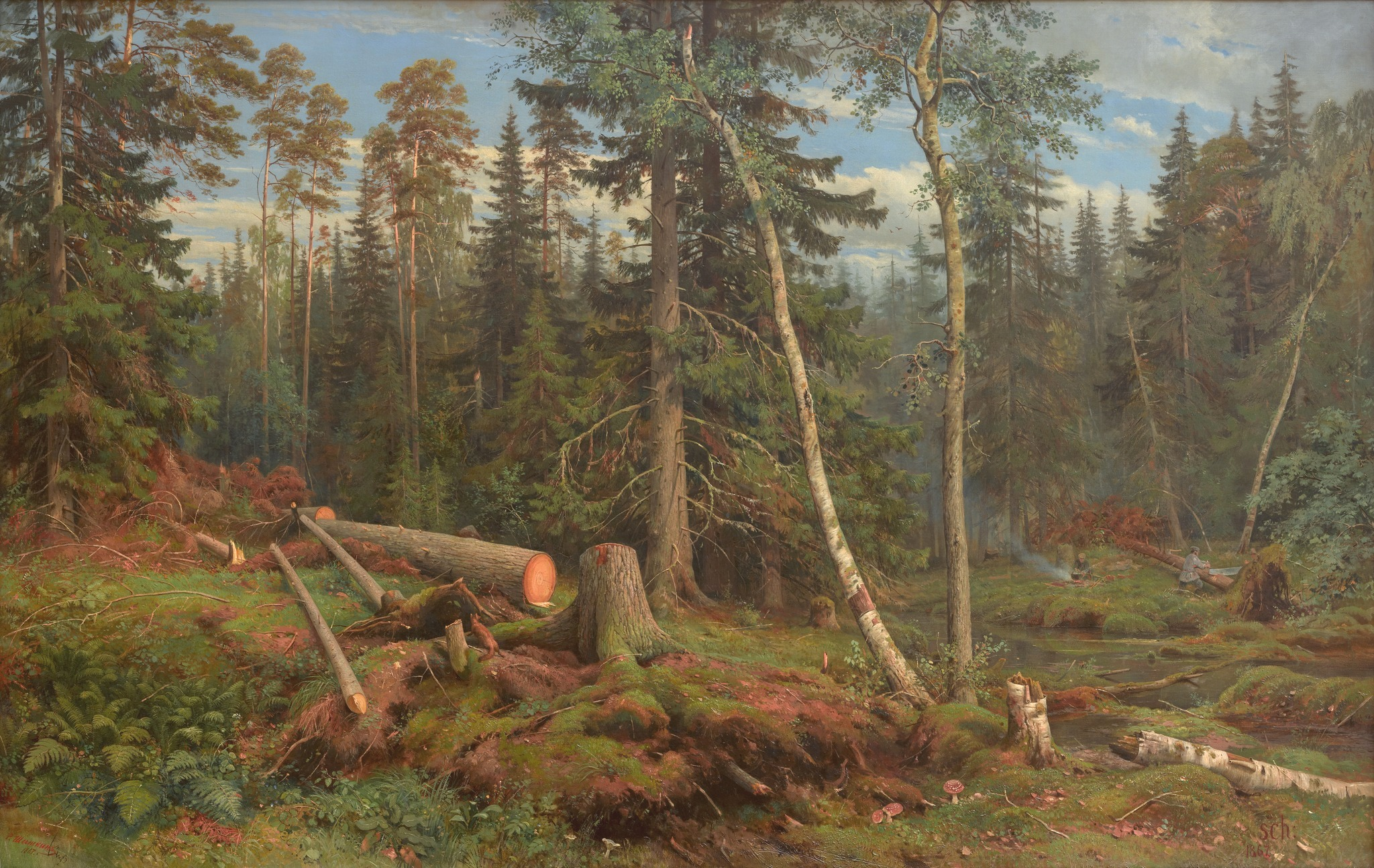
Lumbering, 1867

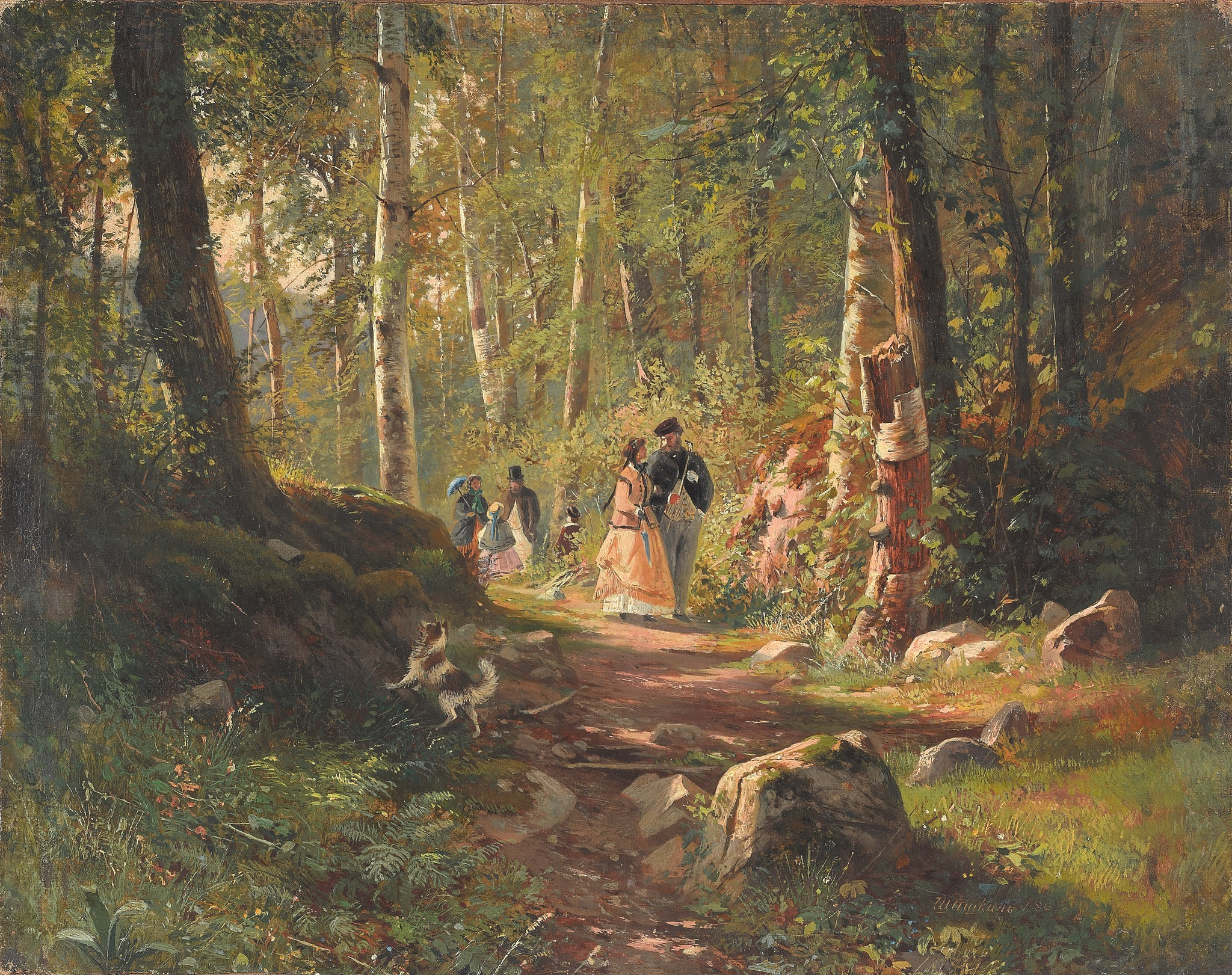
Walk in the Forest, 1869

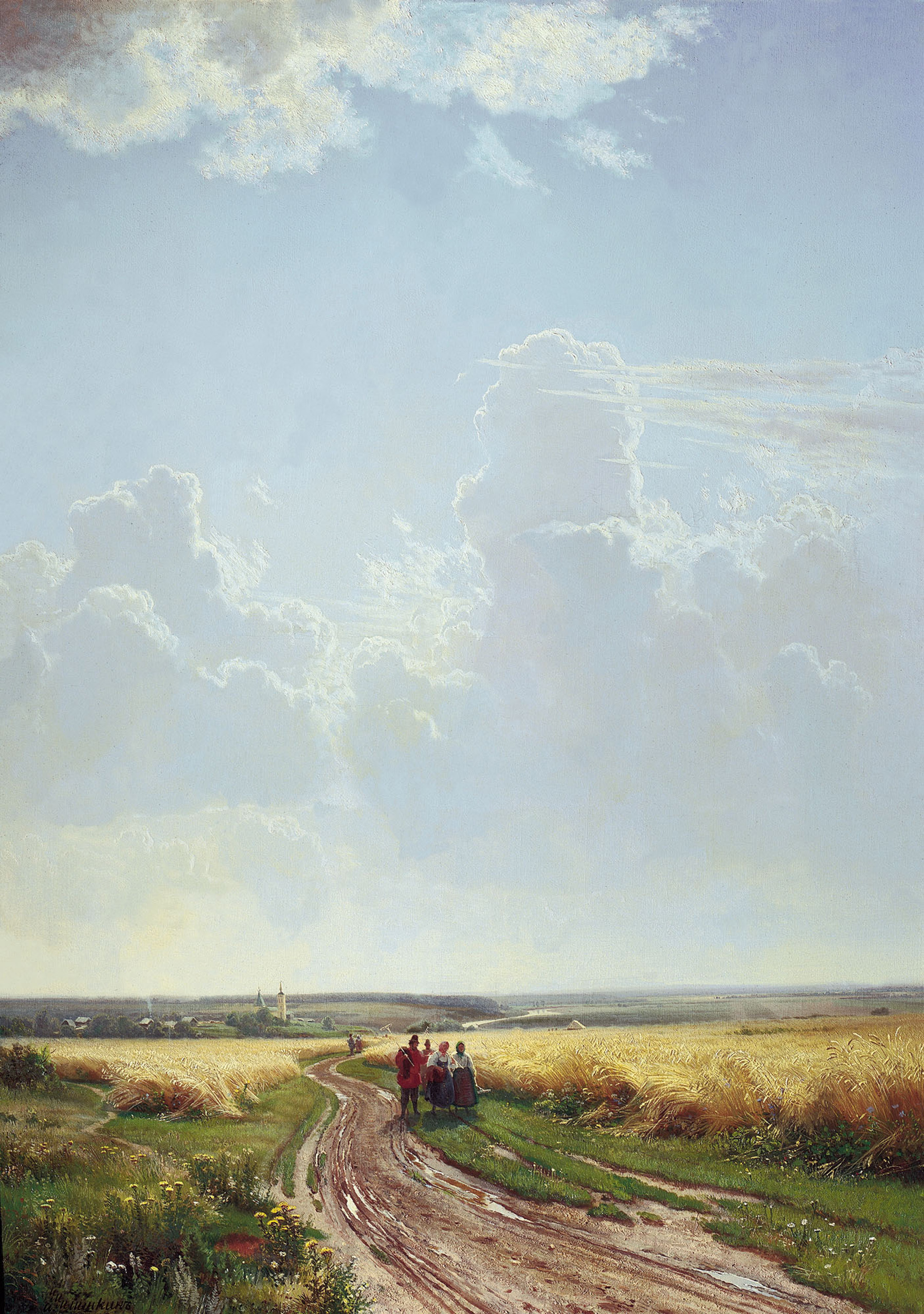
Noon. Neighborhoods of Moscow, 1869

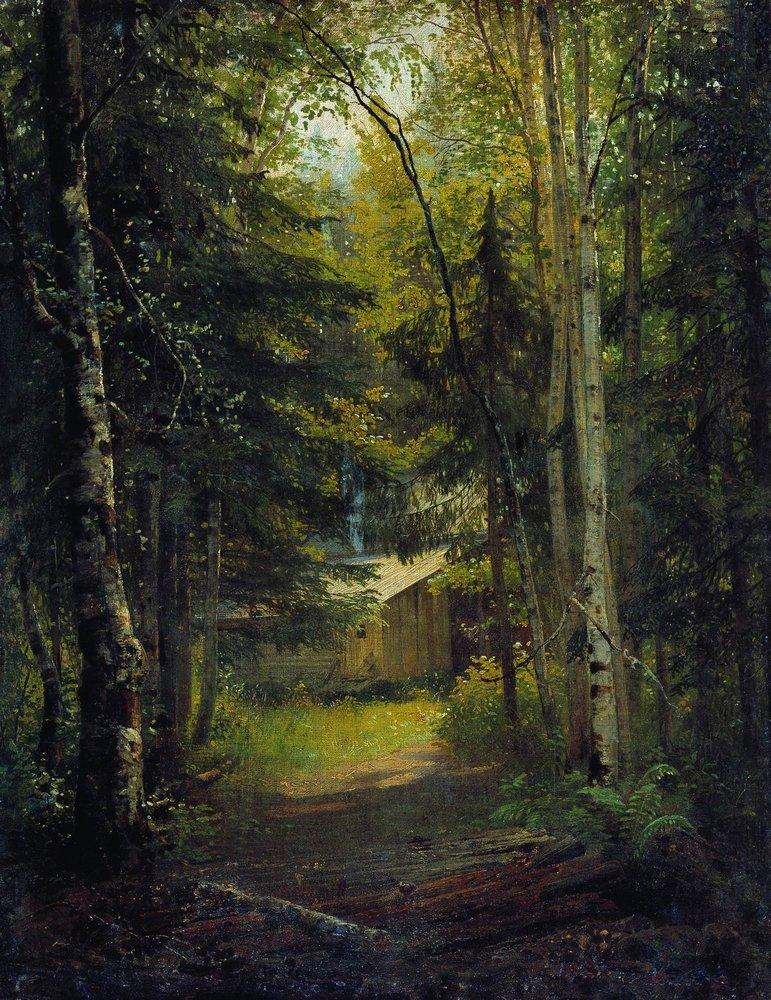
Watchtower in the Forest, 1870

Birch Forest, 1871

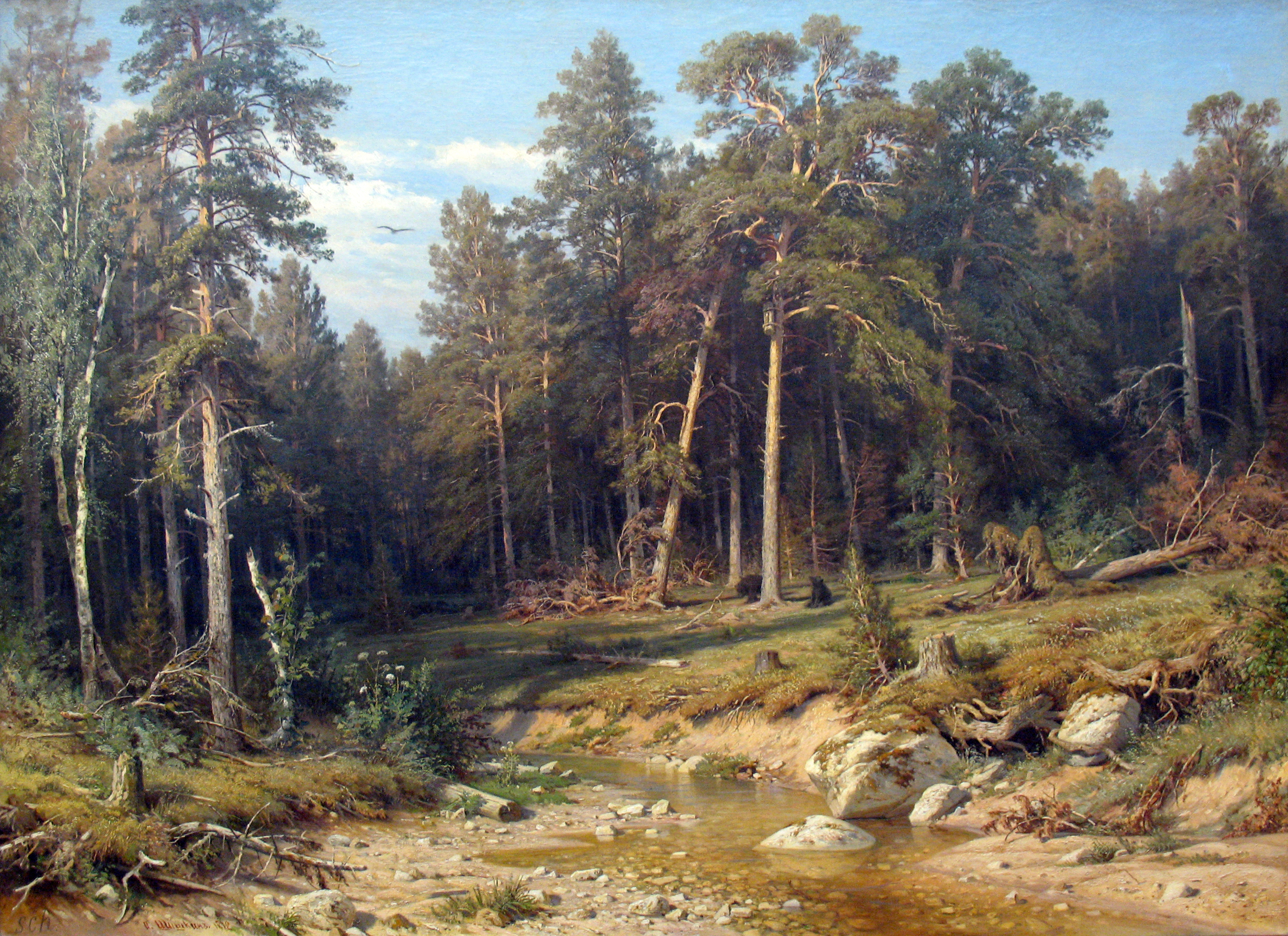
A Pine Forest. Mast-Timber forest in Viatka Province, 1872

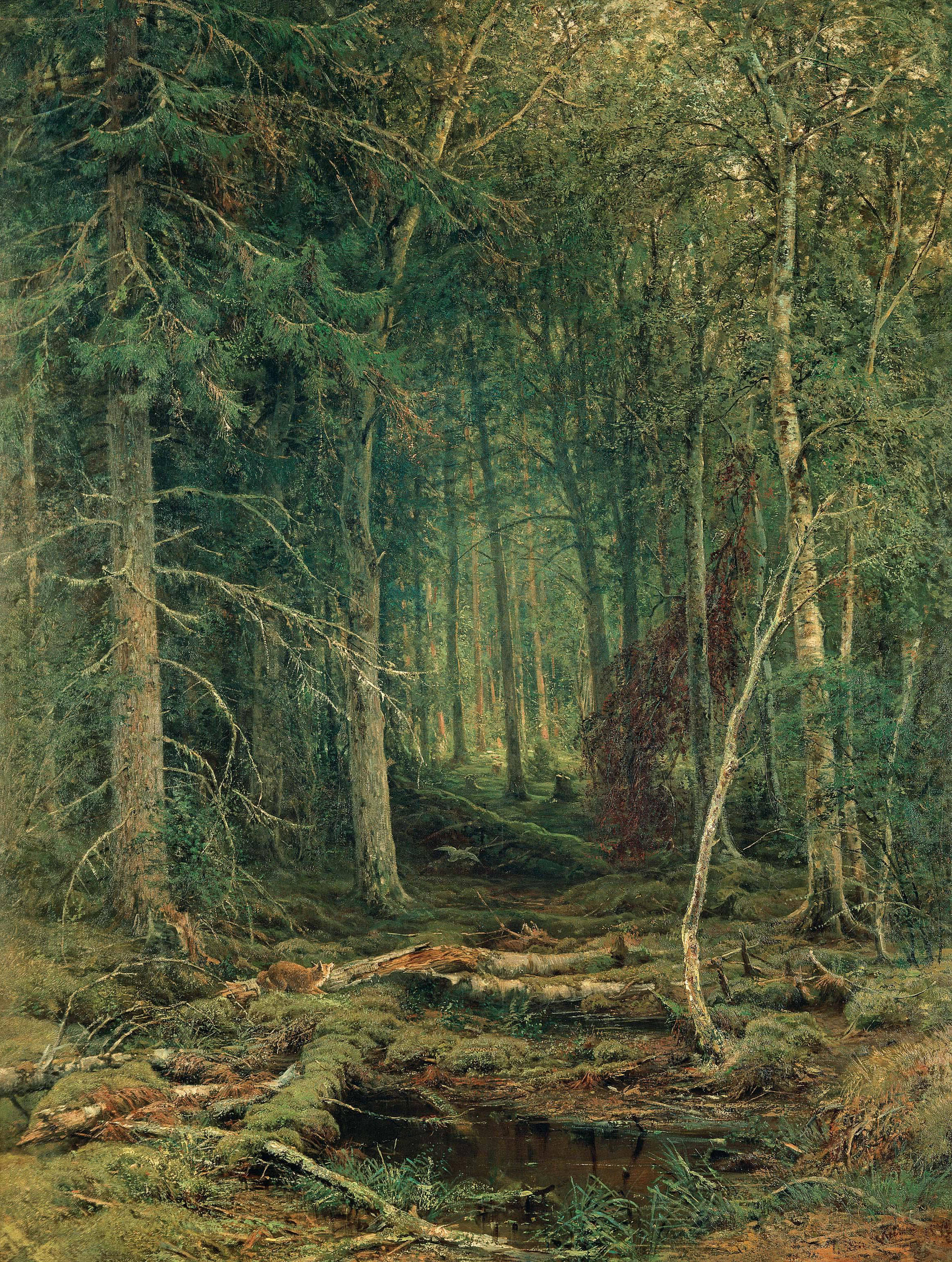
Backwoods, 1872

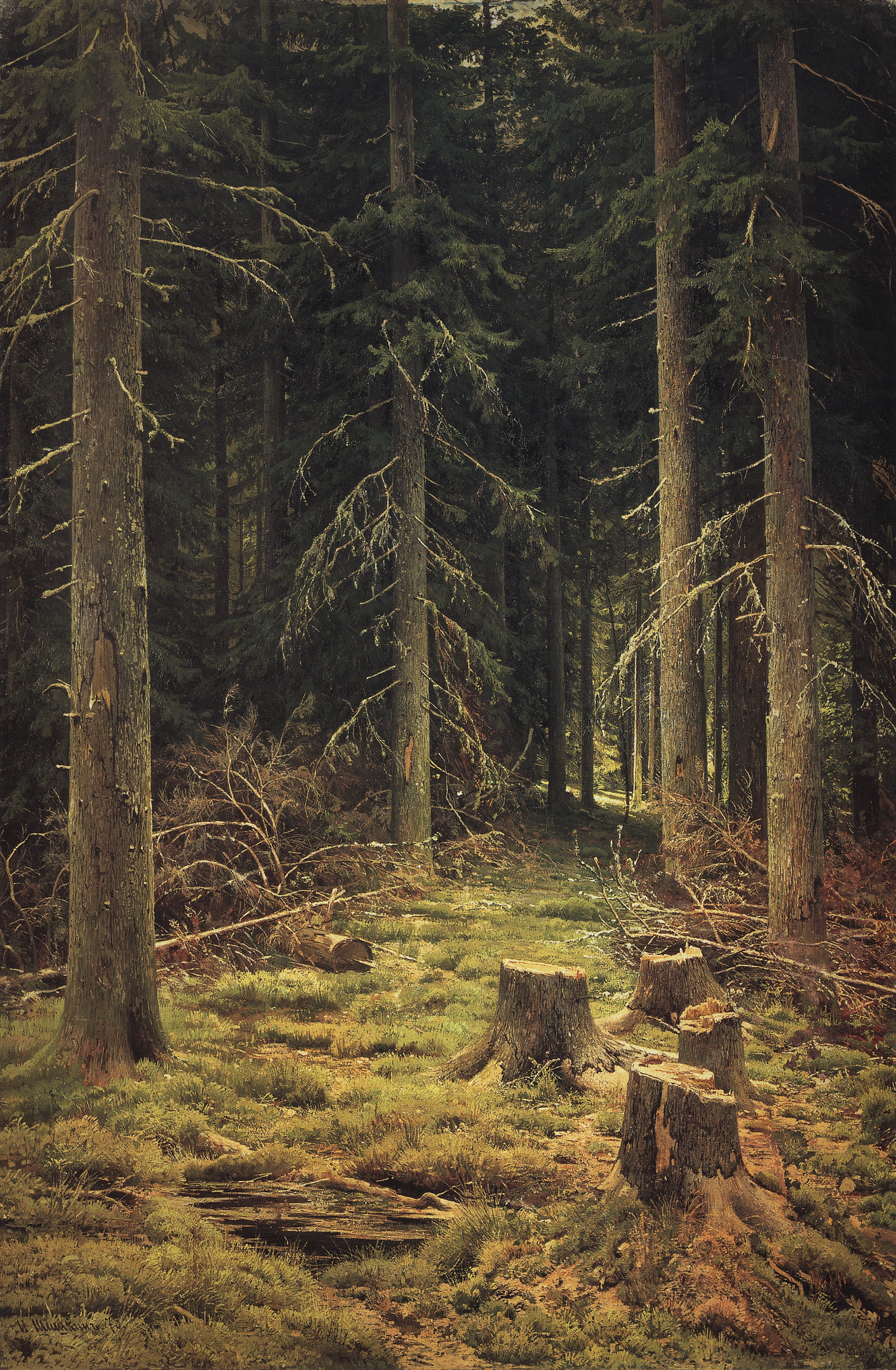
Coniferous forest, 1873

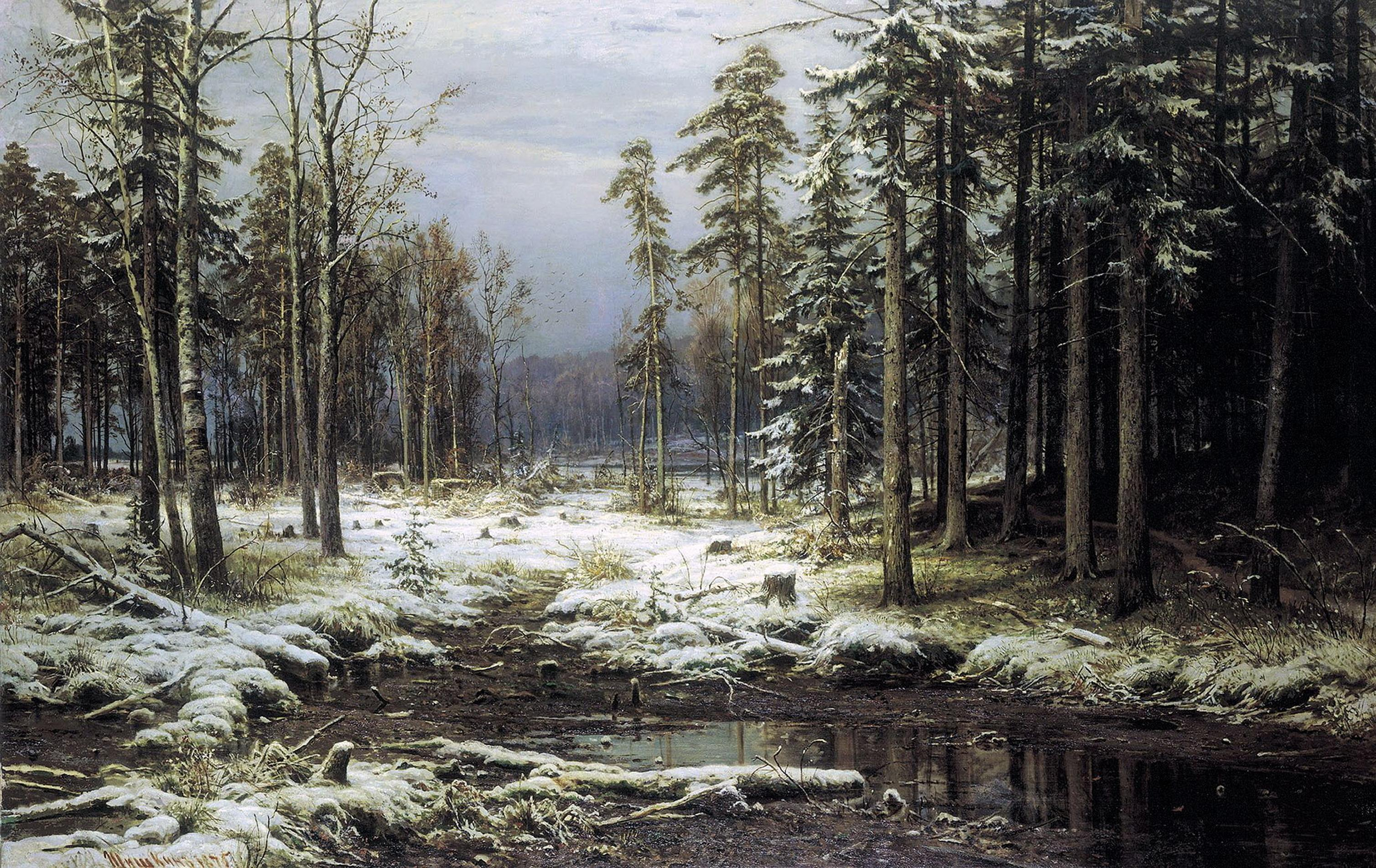
First snow, 1875

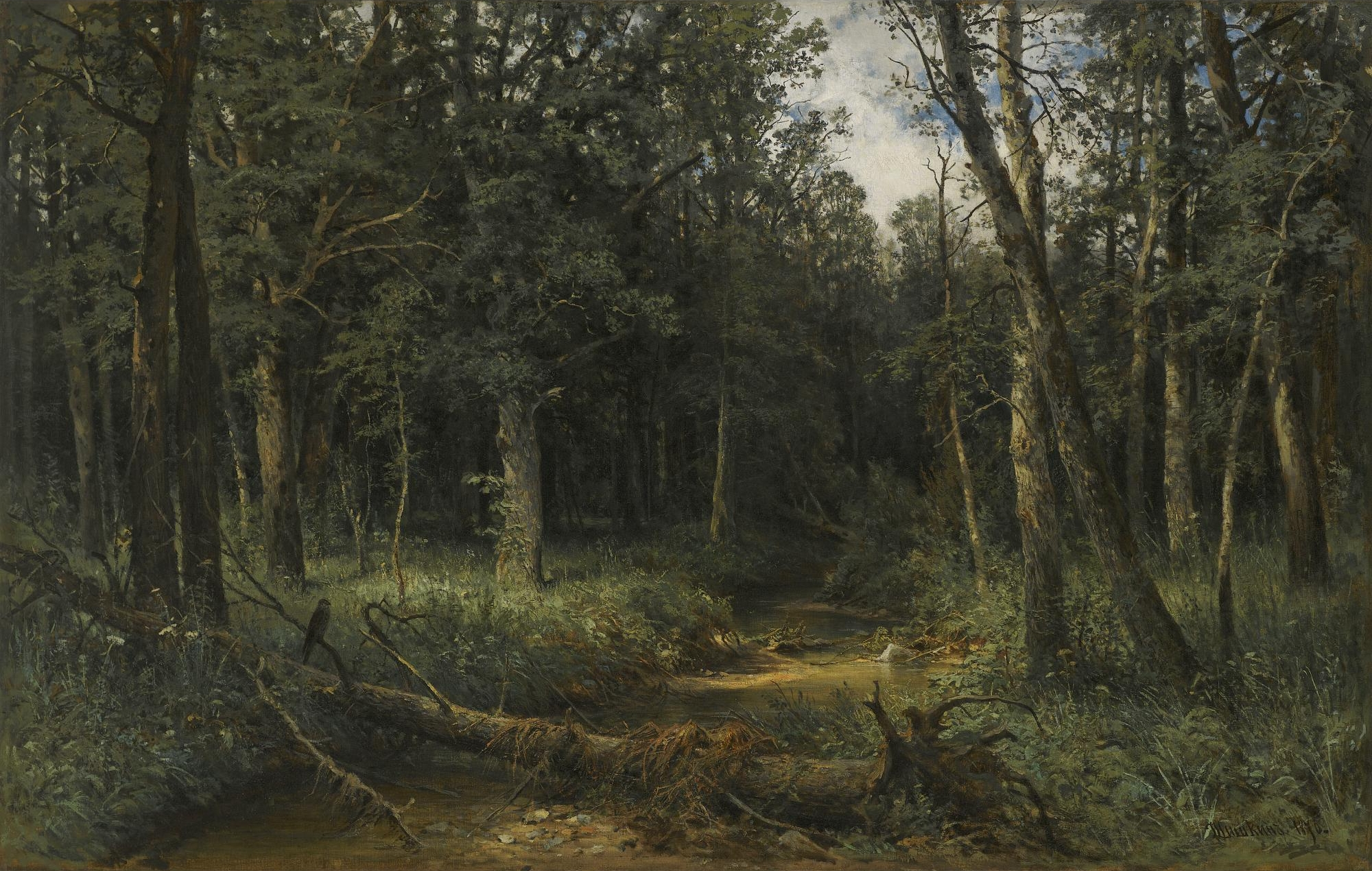
The Dark Wood, 1876

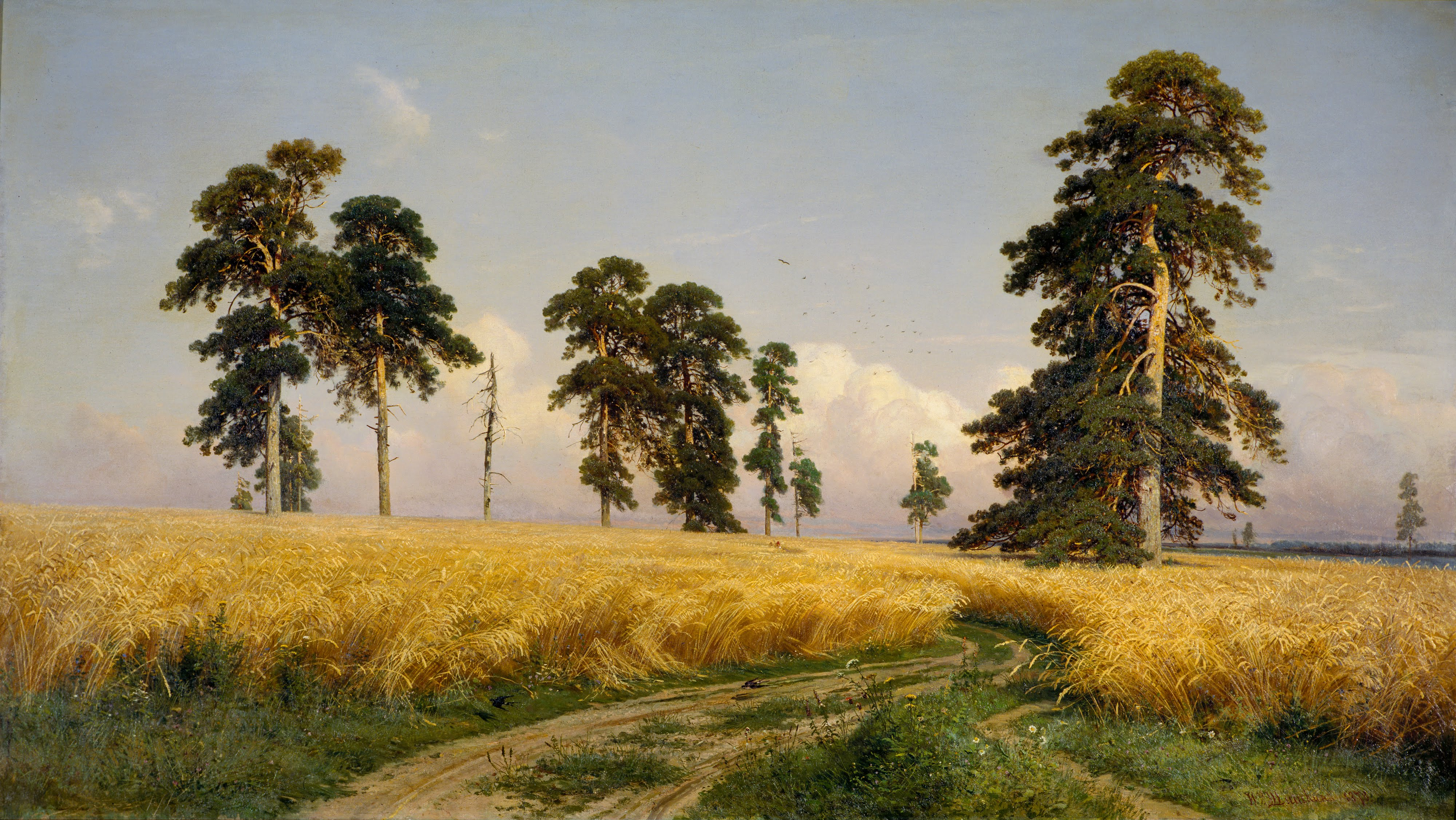
Rye, 1878

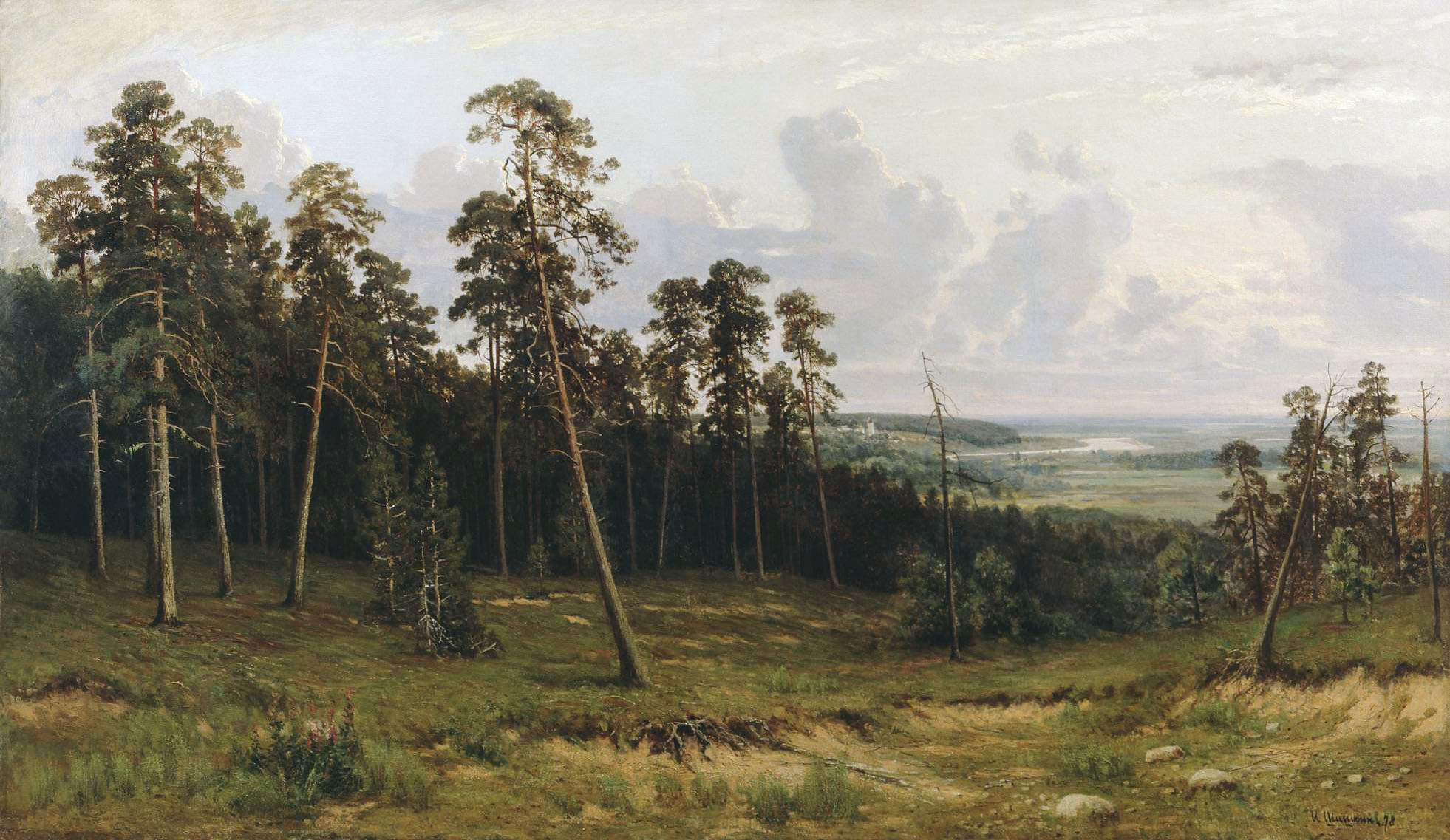
Forest Edge, 1878

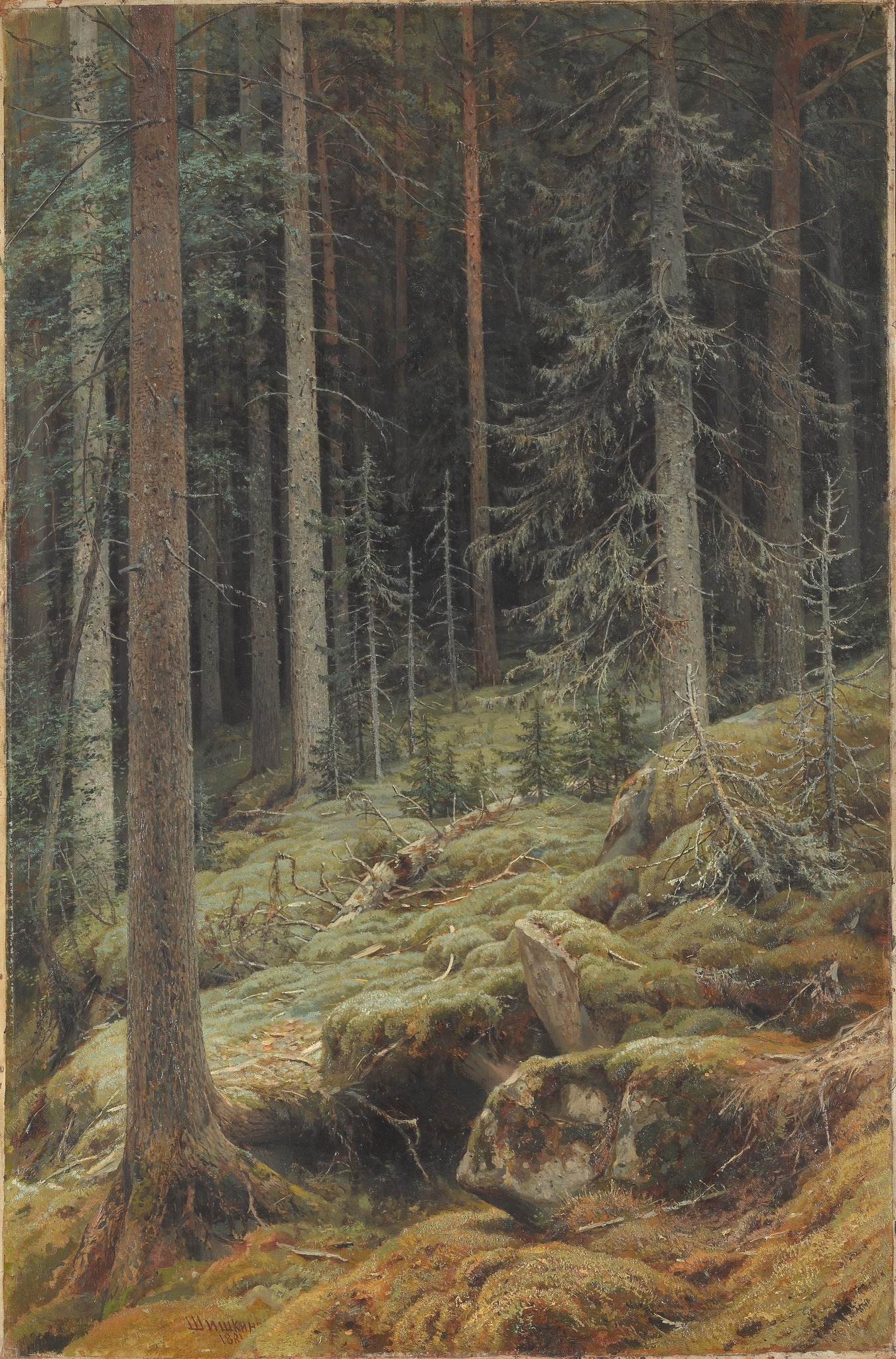
Wilds, 1881

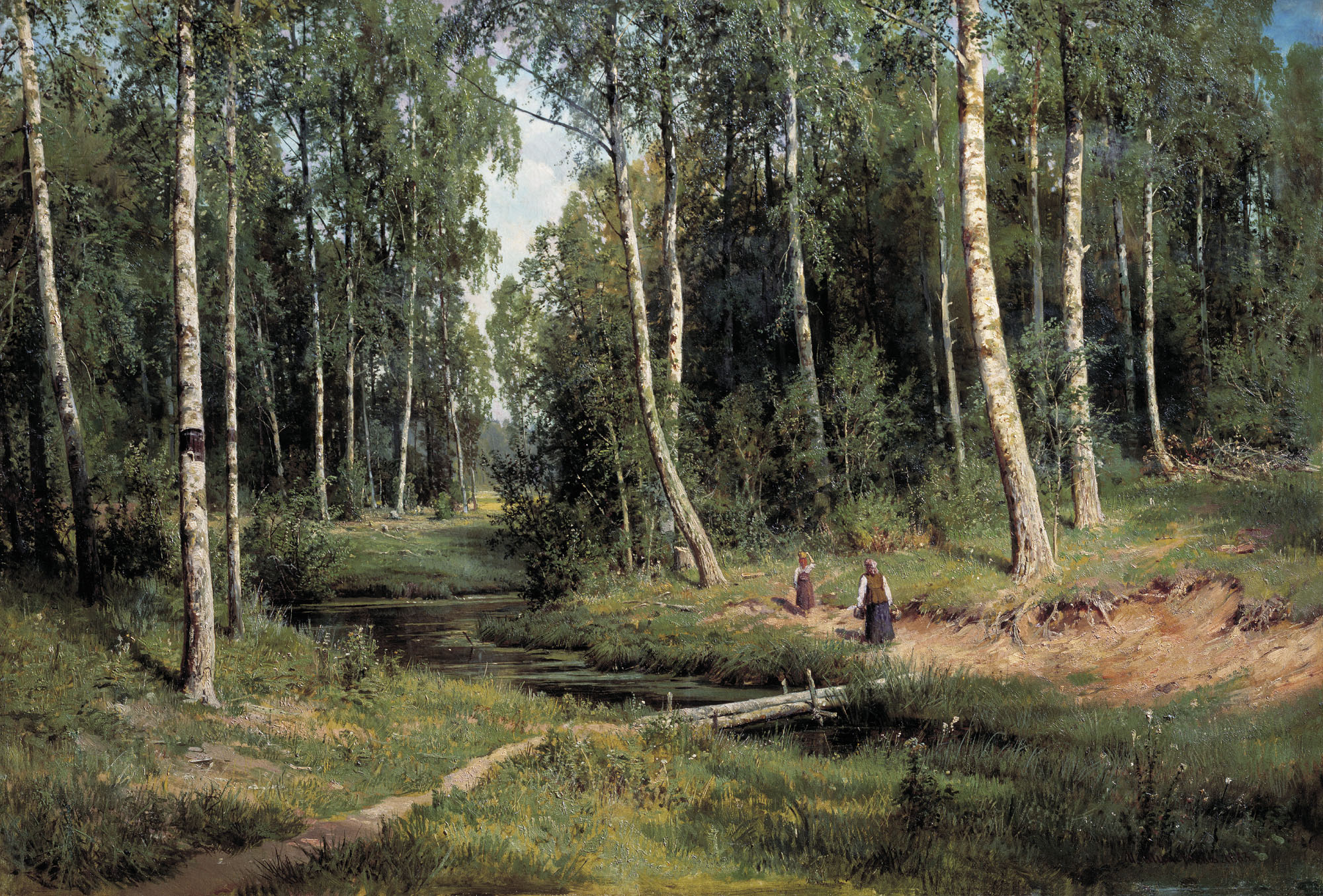
Brook in a Birch Forest, 1883

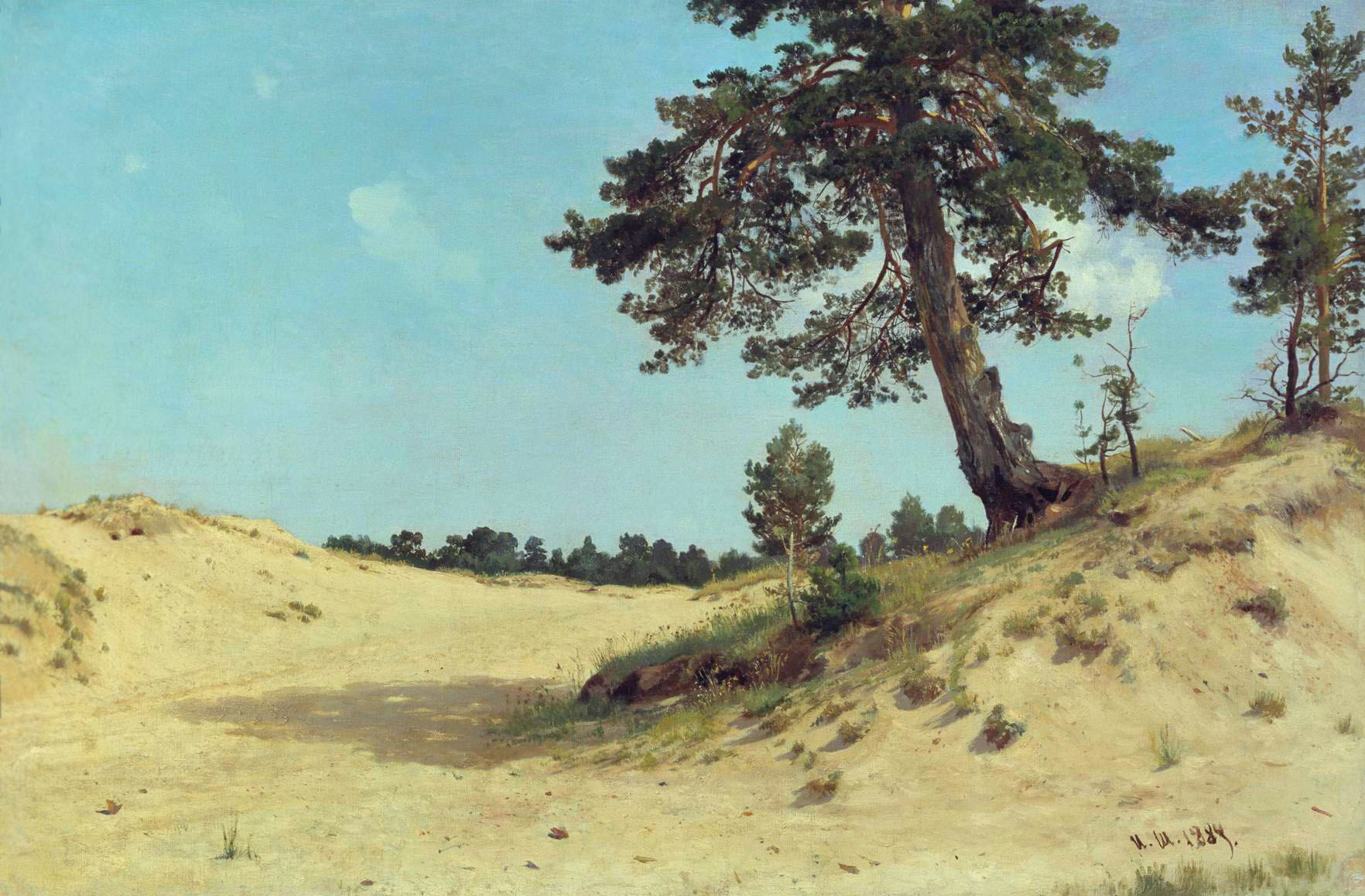
Pine on Sand, 1884

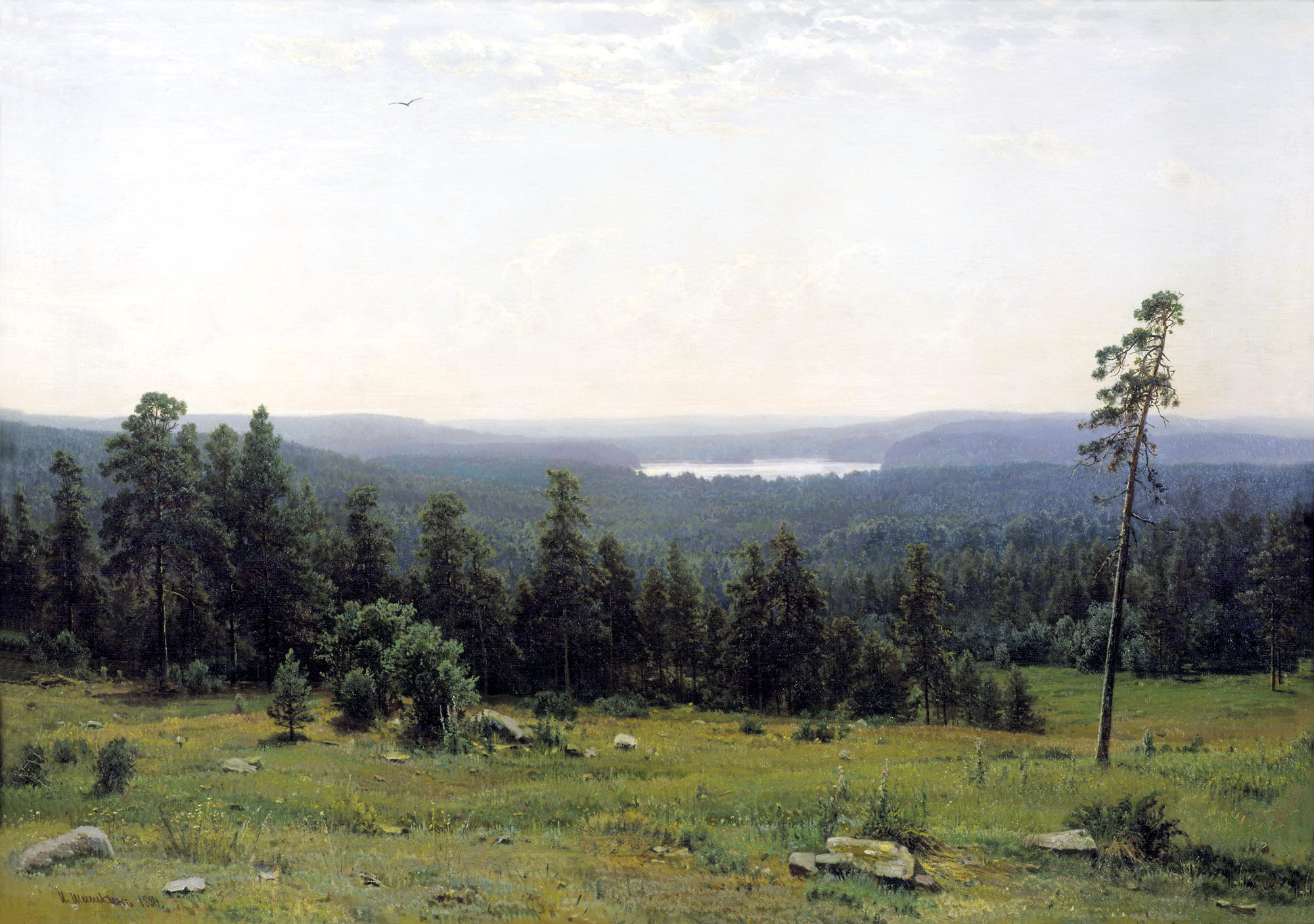
Forest Distance, 1884

Polesie Landscape, 1884

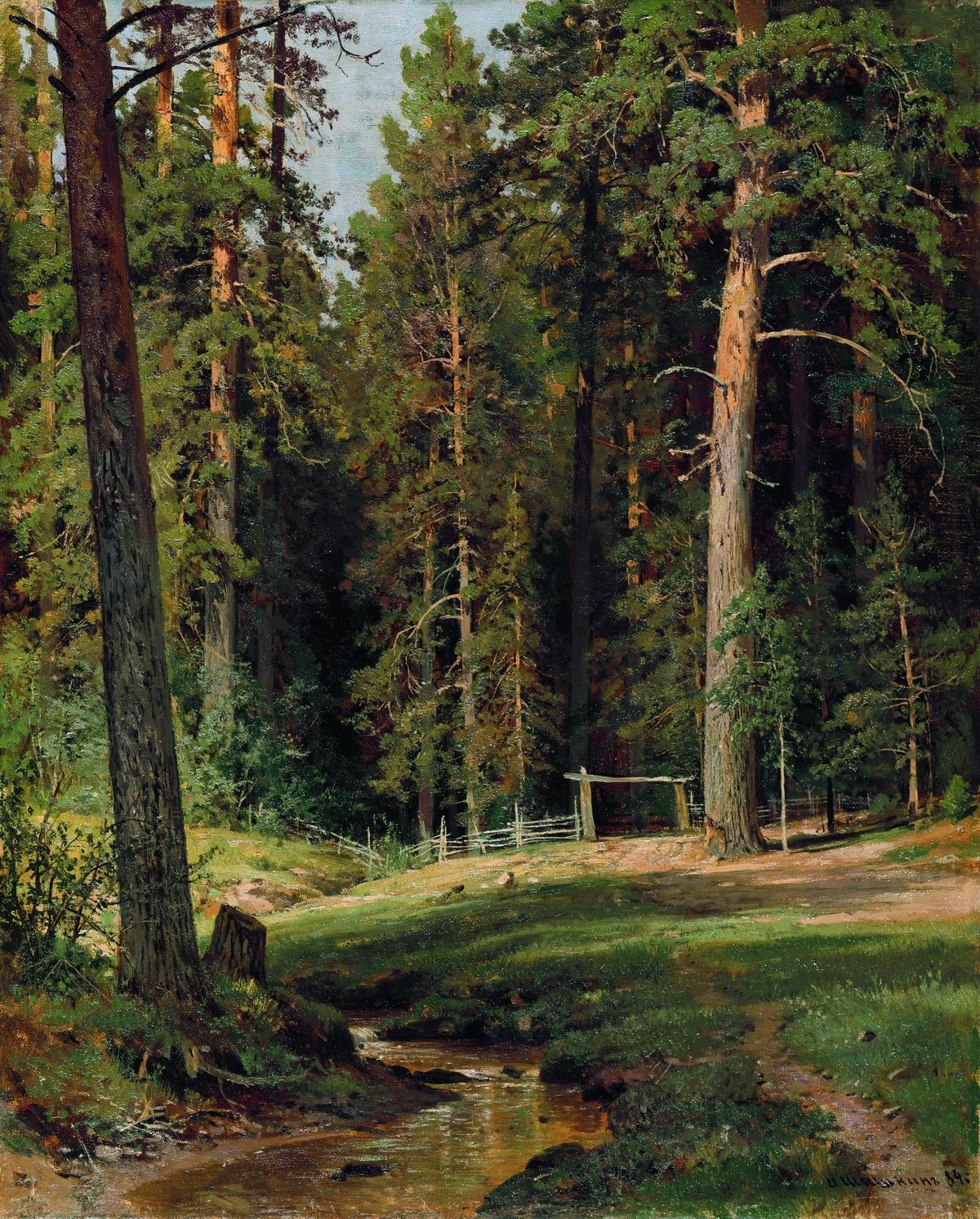
The Edge of the Forest, 1884

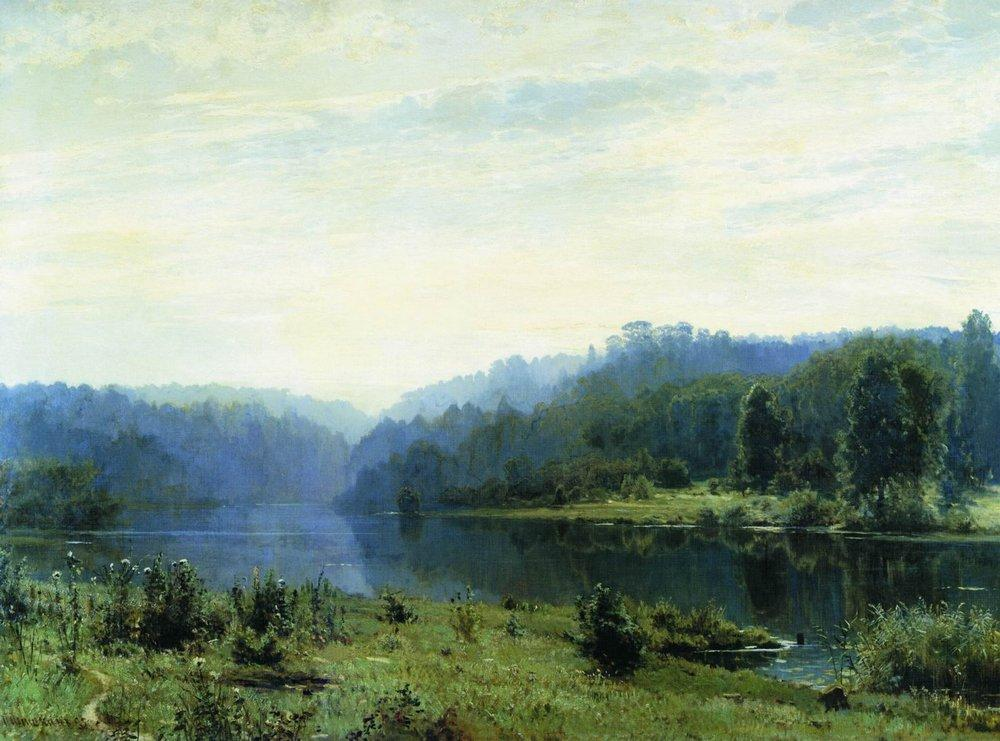
Misty Morning, 1885

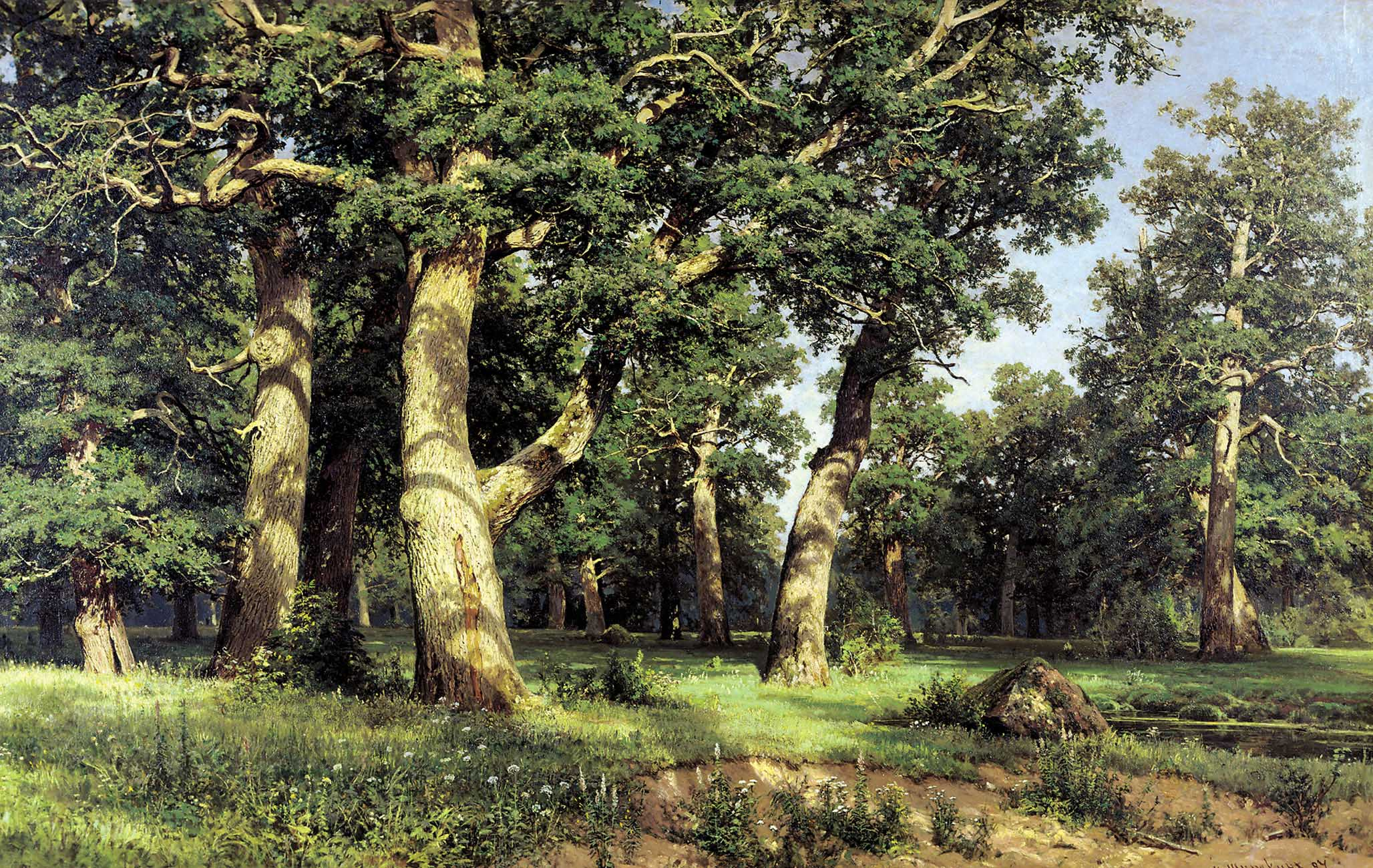
Oak Grove, 1887

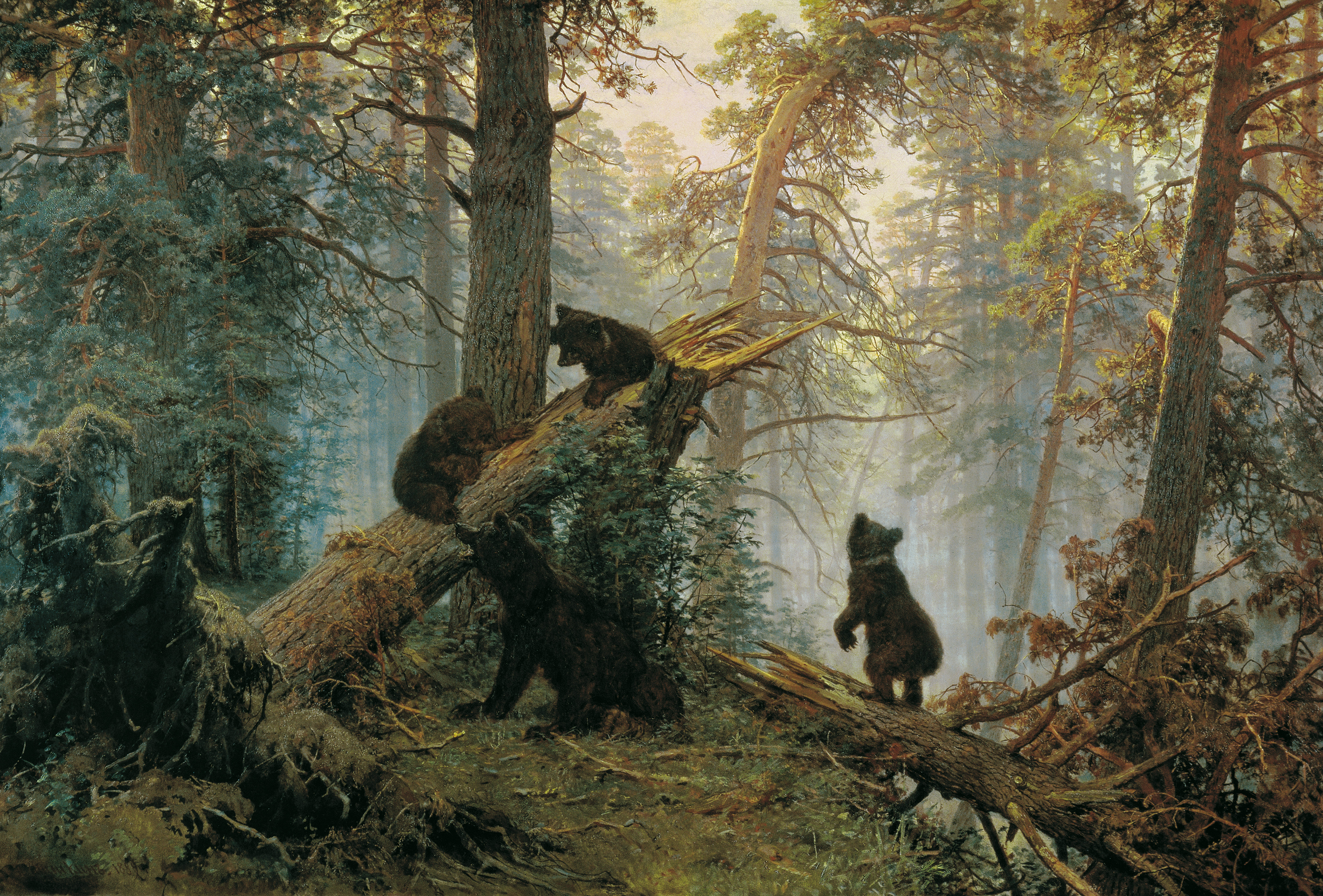
Morning in a Pine Forest, 1889

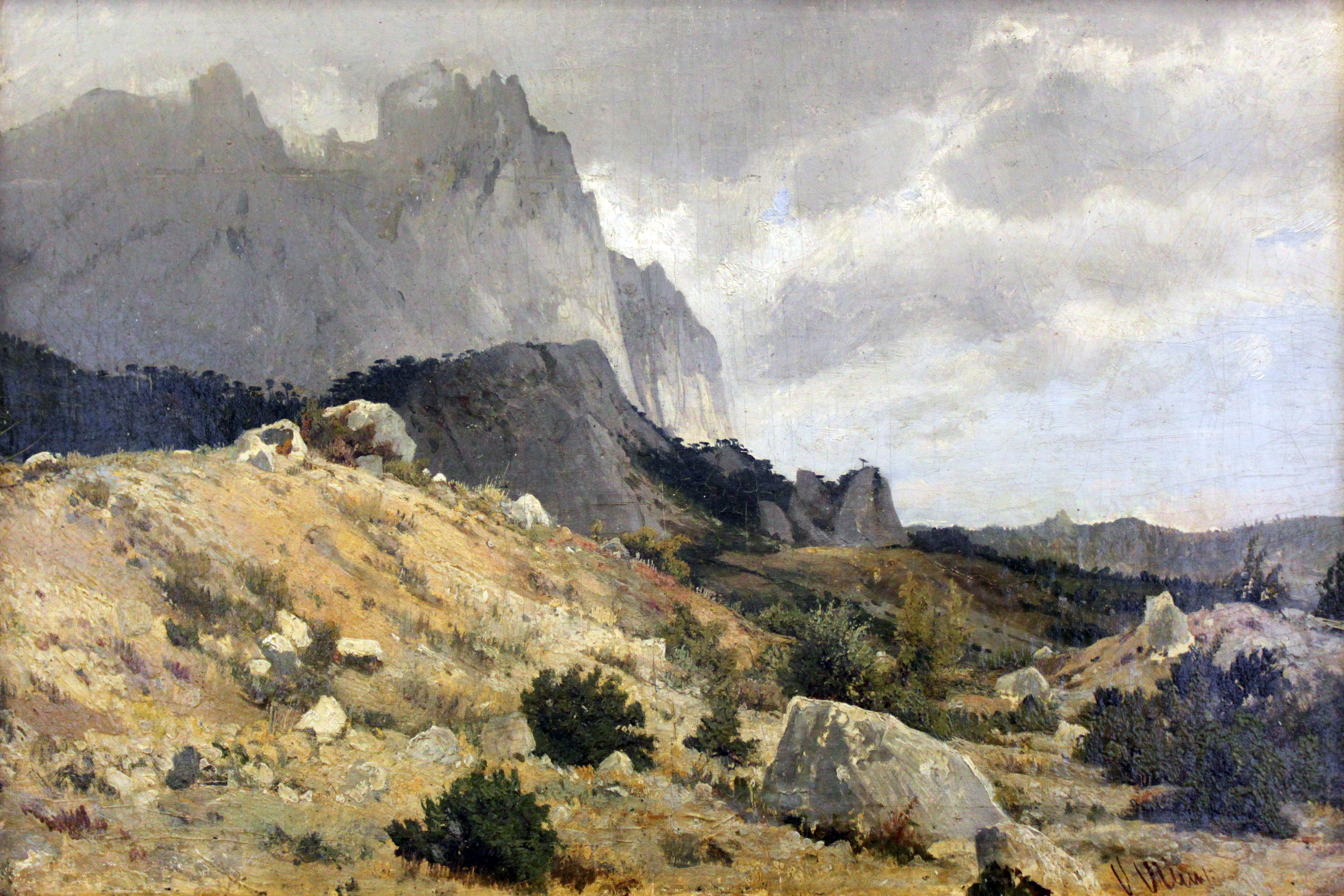
The Rocky Landscape, 1889

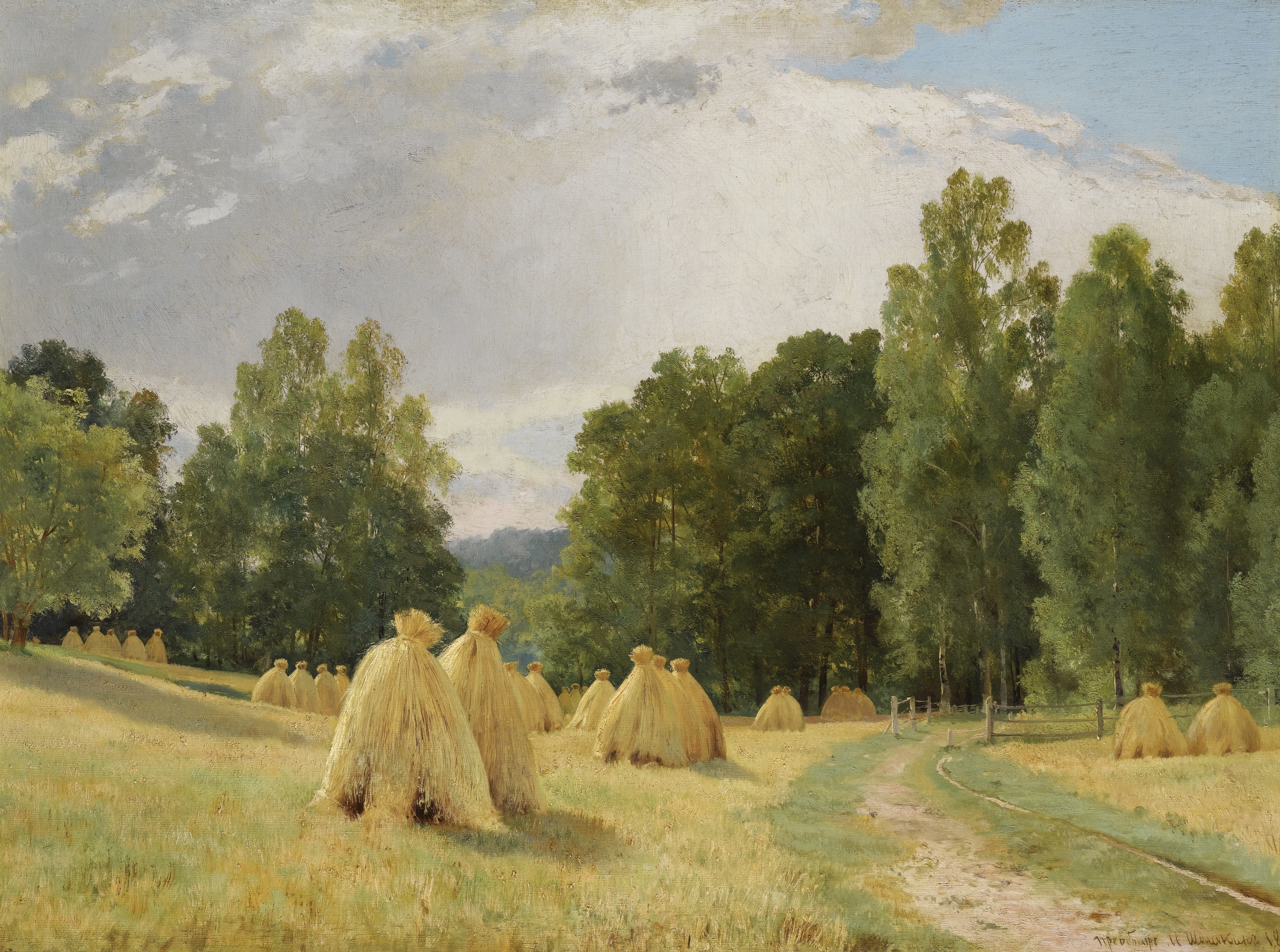
Haystacks, Preobrazhenskoe, 1890

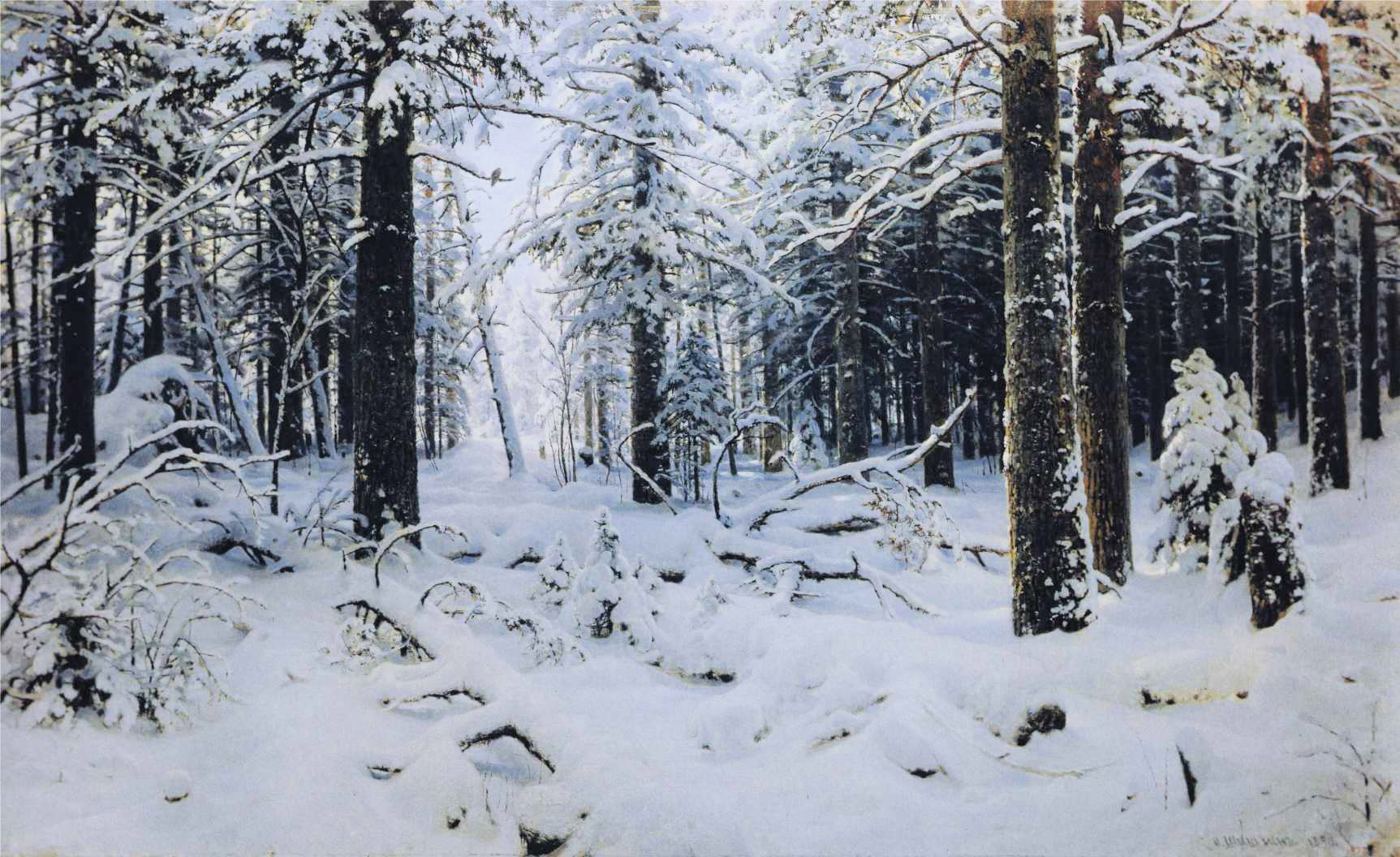
Winter, 1890

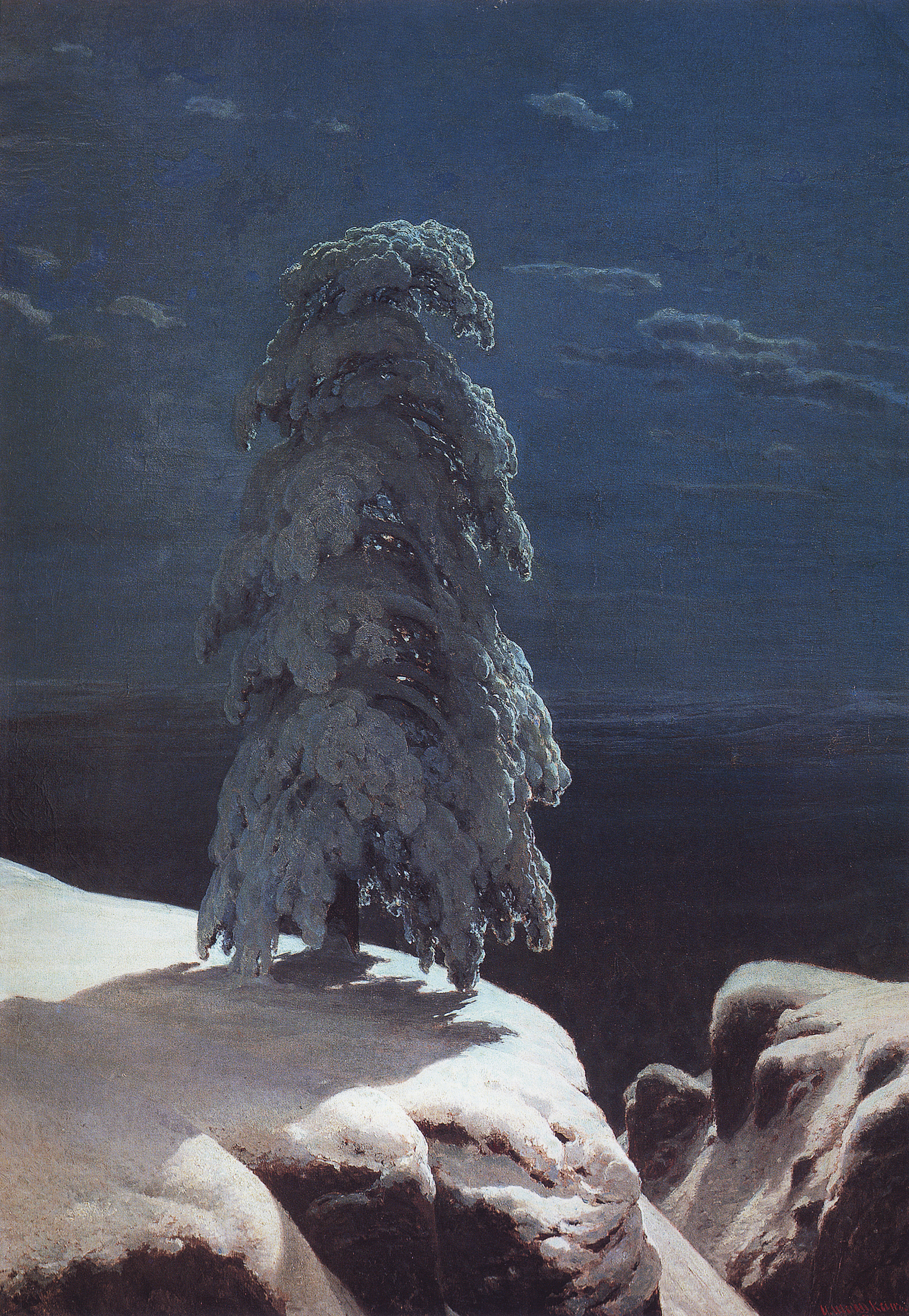
In the Wild North, 1891

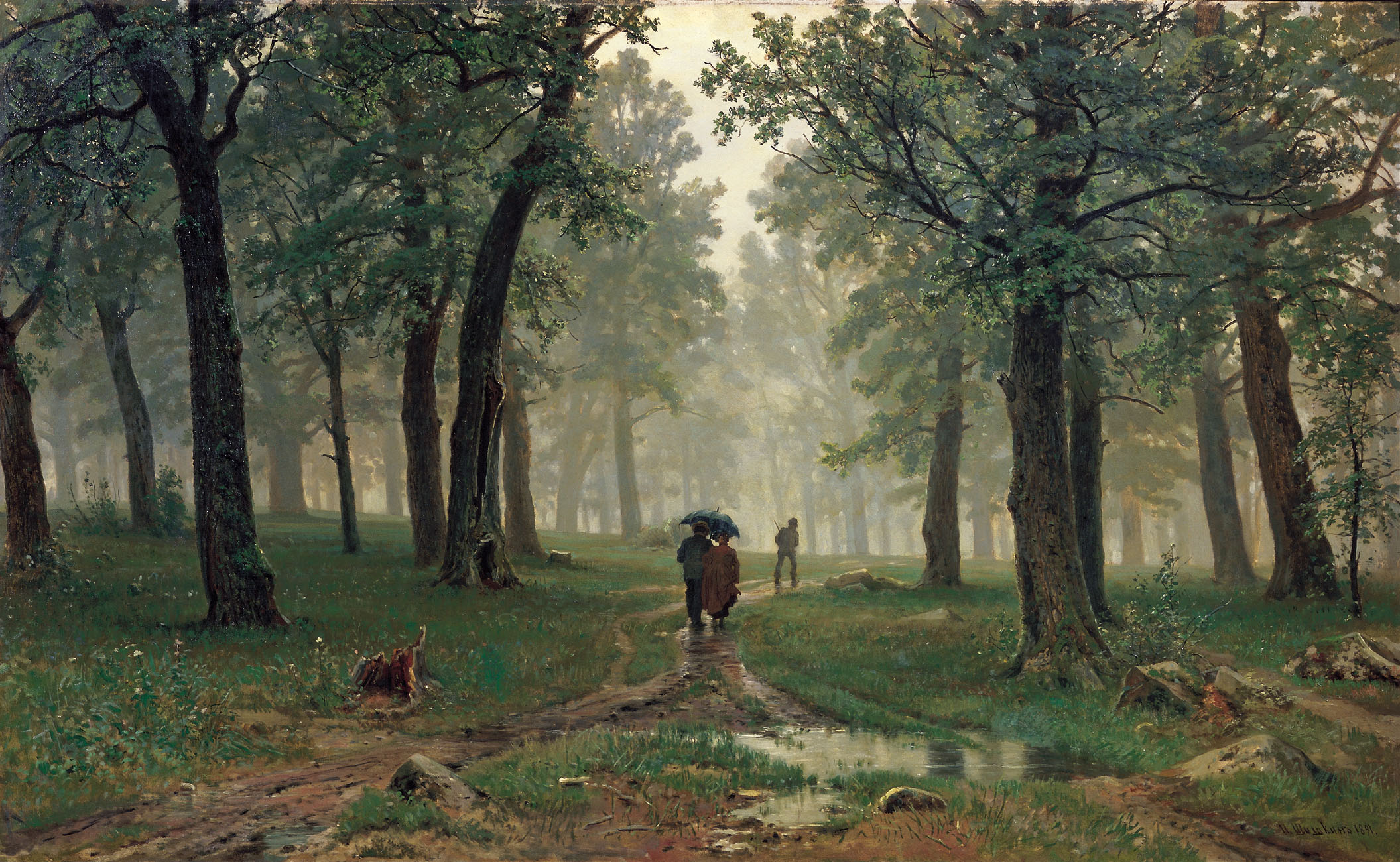
Rain in an Oak Forest, 1891

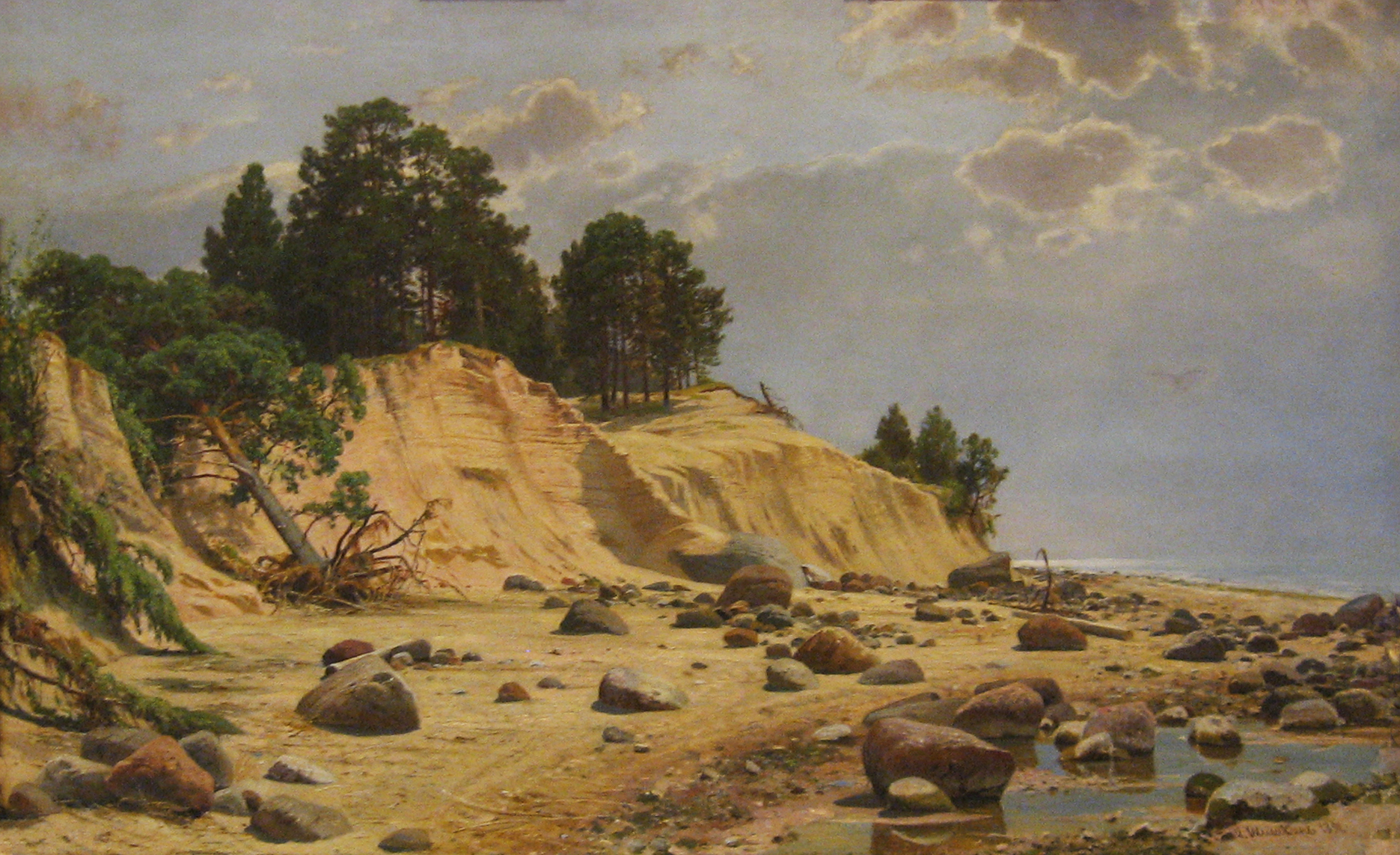
After the Storm in Meri Hovi, 1891

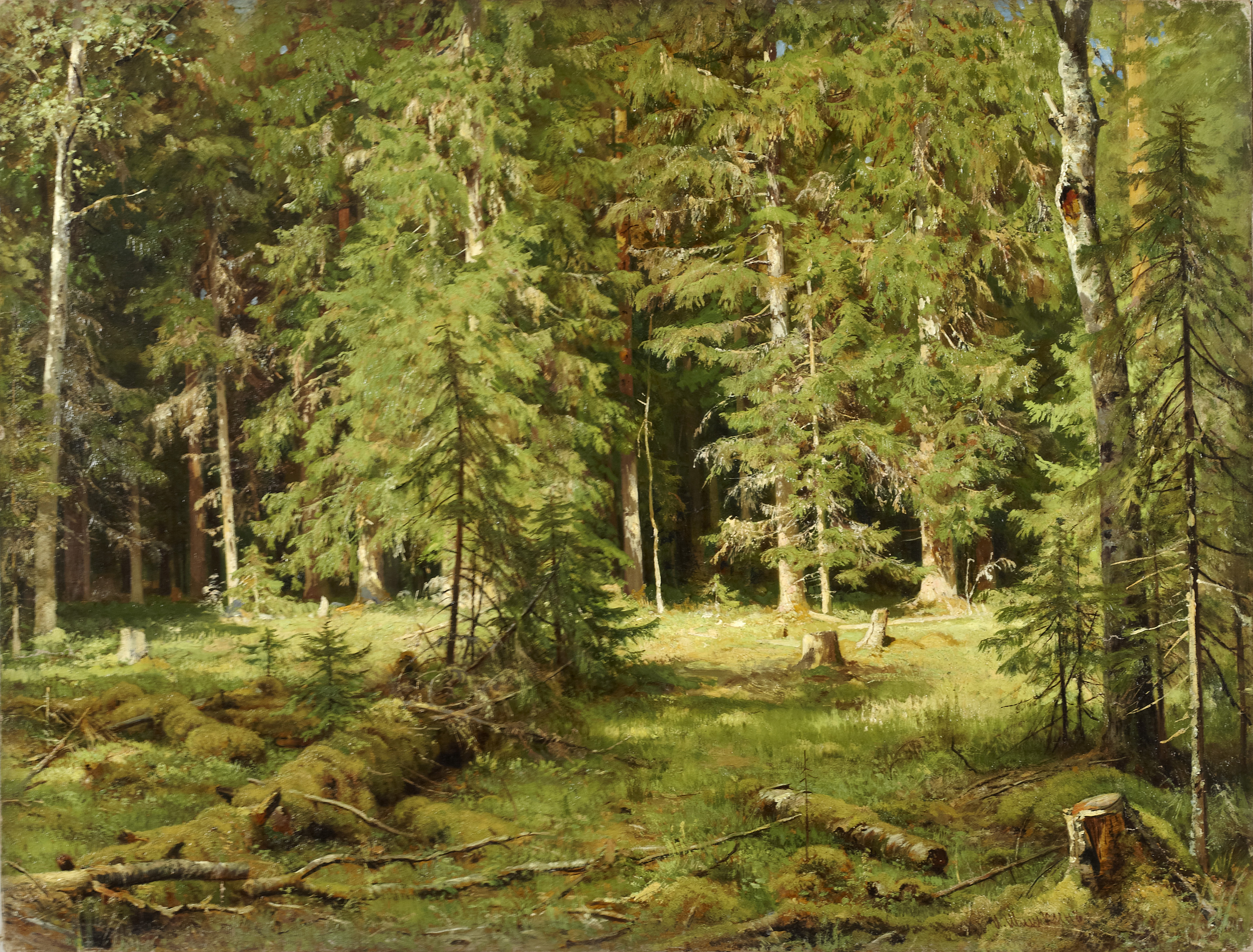
Forest, 1895

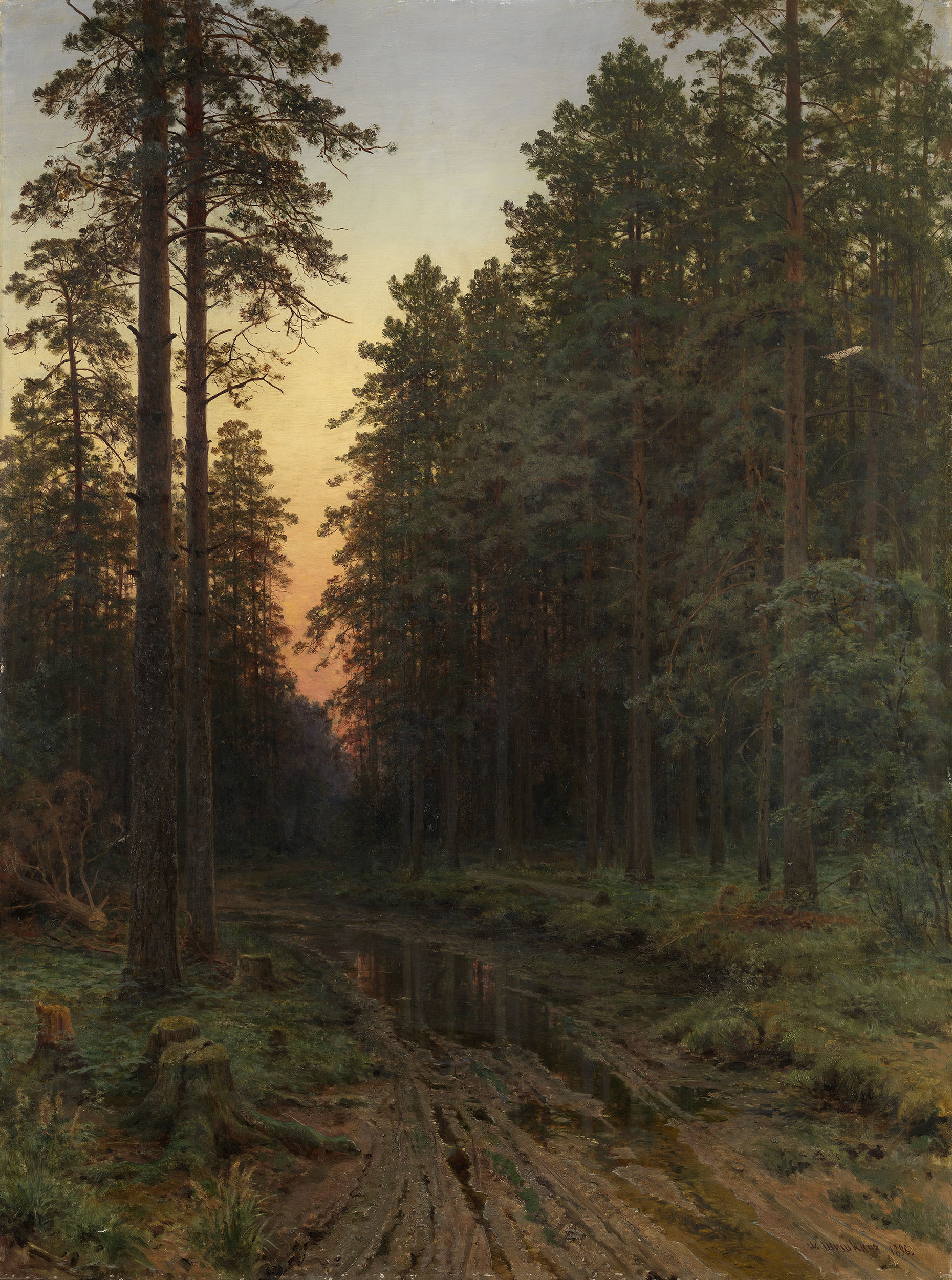
Twilight, 1896

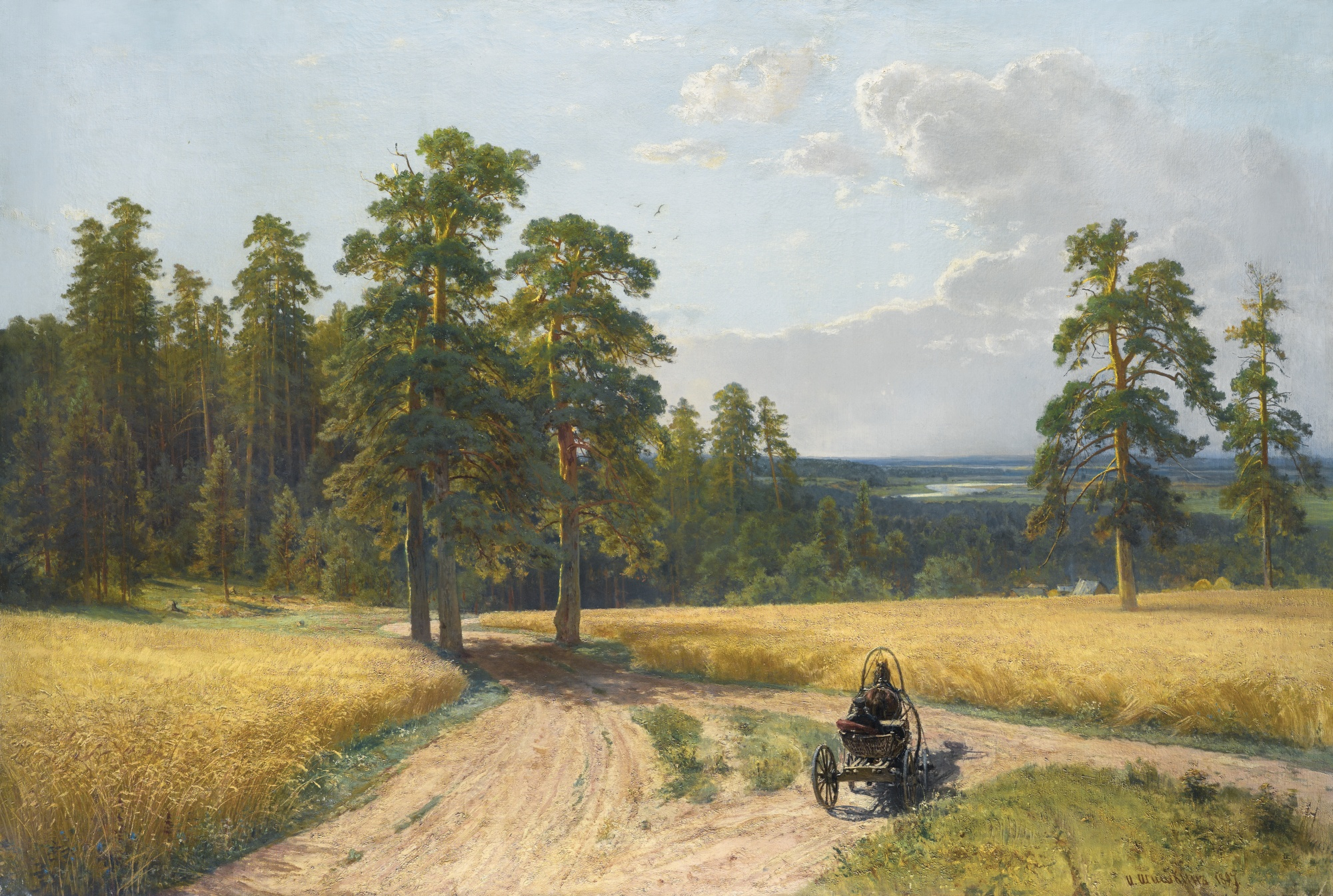
At the Edge of the Pine Forest, 1897
