= Kazan Gymnasium =

School in Kazan, Russia

Coordinates: 55.7971°N 49.1141°E

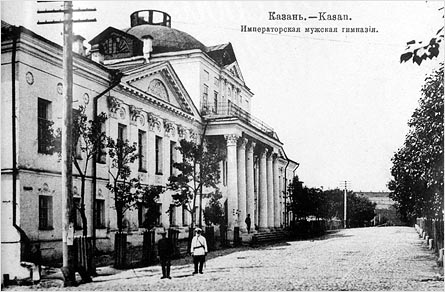
An image of Kazan Gymnasium

Kazan Gymnasium was a gymnasium of Kazan, Tatarstan, Russia. It is notable for its alumnus, Nikolai Ivanovich Lobachevsky, who graduated from the school in 1807. Other notable alumni include Ivan Shishkin, a Russian landscape artist, and Gavrila Derzhavin, a poet. The school was established during the reign of Elizabeth of Russia.
