= Captain Pronin =

Russian animated parody series

- Opening frame
- Genre: Parody; Surreal humour Slapstick
- Created by: Mikhail Georgiyevich Zaitsev
- Written by: Mikhail Zaitsev; Rosalia Zelma
- Directed by: Mikhail Zaitsev; Rosalia Zelma
- Voices of: Igor Vernik; Rogvold Sukhoverko; Aleksandr Pozharov; Vsevolod Abdulov
- Theme music composer: Sergey Lemokh
- Opening theme: "Captain Pronin – Superstar" by Car-Man
- Composers: Taras Buyevsky; Igor Yefremov
- Country of origin: Russia
- Original language: Russian
- No. of episodes: 4

Production
- Cinematography: Ernst Gaman
- Running time: 6–10 minutes approx.
- Production company: Studio Ekran

Captain Pronin (Russian: Капитан Пронин, romanized: Kapitan Pronin) is a Russian animated cartoon parody series created by Mikhail Zaitsev. The series consists of four short animated films produced at Studio Ekran between 1992 and 1994, then expanded into a book series and a video game. Its story revolves around the eponymous protagonist, the grandson of Major Pronin, and his adventures which parody various film clichés. (Major Pronin is a character from Russian jokes, originated as a literary character created by Lev Ovalov, a James Bond-type super-chekist.)

== Premise ==
Each episode begins with the depiction of the Morning in a Pine Forest painting that turns into the Joint Venture Filmpotrebsoyuz Pictures logo, a Metro-Goldwyn-Mayer parody with a roaring bear, which then throws a surrounding ring off, exploding the screen and revealing the episode's real title.

The series follows the adventures of a Russian detective, Captain Pronin. After being raised and trained by his grandfather Major Pronin, he now serves in the police department (Militsiya) of post-Soviet Russia. By virtue of his office, Captain Pronin is engaged on missions to fight crime, wherein his extraordinary abilities and a fair bit of luck help him to emerge unscathed from tough battles with delinquents.

== Characters ==
- Captain Pronin (voiced by Igor Vernik) is a Russian police detective, who fights crime in his homeland, and around the world. He is a tall, well-built, red-haired grandson of his famous detective grandfather, Major Pronin. He appears to be highly skilled with firearms, swordsmanship, and hand-to-hand combat. His superhuman reflexes allow him to dodge high-speed projectiles like bullets, while his body is able to withstand the vacuum of space by using only a gas mask for breathing. He also shows remarkable talents in gambling, playing the accordion, and ballet. He is married to a chubby-cheeked housewife, and is completely faithful to her.
- Swistunov (voiced by Vsevolod Abdulov) is a blue-skinned, bald drug-dealer with a golden earring in his right ear, clad in a leather studded vest. He operates in a cooperative café, Malina ("Raspberry"), and, like all its habitués, is a heavy metal music fan and an addict of such illicit drugs as heroin, marijuana and crack. He is subordinated to the Chief, then is involved in smuggling operations of precious metals for the American Mafia. His identity and outfit were subsequently used by Pronin to get on the trail of the mafia in New York City. His name is a wordplay using the word "whistler" and the surname suffix -ov.
- Putana (voiced by Tatyana Sergeyeva) is a blonde assassin beauty, clad in a pink dress, whose hallmark is a gold tooth. She is skilled in seducing men and firearms, but is panicky afraid of small rodents like mice. She is subordinated to the Chief, and only known by her operation codename, which is referred to a synonym of "prostitute".
- Myshyakovich (voiced by Aleksandr Pozharov) is a green-skinned Count Orlok-like drug manufacturer, whose laboratory is located in a medieval castle. He has armed orderlies under his command, while his hobby is cruel human experimentation in the field of dentistry. He's subordinated to the Chief, and is wanted by Interpol. His name is a wordplay using the word "Arsenic" and the surname suffix -ovich.
- James Bond (voiced by Vsevolod Abdulov) is a pink-skinned British Secret Service agent, сlad in tuxedo and bow tie. He moved to Russia in search of an Interpol wanted criminal, Myshyakovich. He is highly skilled in disguise, infiltration, close combat, and throwing grenades. He is revealed to be Pronin's ally.
- The Chief (voiced by Rogvold Sukhoverko) is the underground mafia boss, whose mandibular teeth replaced by diced implants with suit symbols. He controls drug dealing and other crimes, and has subordinates, Swistunov, Putana, Myshyakovich and ninjas, to whom he gives orders by phone. It is later revealed, that his true identity is a corrupt officer superior to Pronin, Colonel Ostap Tarasych Mentura.
- Don Corleone (voiced by Vsevolod Abdulov) is the pink-skinned, prick-eared, mafia boss of Italian descent, clad in black. He is the godfather of the American Mafia, and threatens to send a cyborg assassin to U.S. President. His criminal mob equipped with handguns, bazookas, and various vehicles, up to helicopters, and he himself possesses a personal computer that can be transformed into the cyborg assassin, Car-Man.
- The Commander (voiced by Rogvold Sukhoverko) is the leader of an invasion on Earth, clad in a Darth Vader-esque suit with retractable horns on the helmet and a red cape. He heads an Imperial squadron of space invaders in seeking to conquer alien planets. He armed with a blaster and a lightsaber, which he skillfully fences, and his powered armor, energized to thousands of volts, allows him to shoot energy bolts from his palms. He is interested in marrying Princess Vespa, whom he intimidates after her abduction.
- Princess Vespa (voiced by Lyudmila Ilyina) is a blond beauty, clad in a white dress, who holds the title of the crown princess of Sirius, and Miss Universe. She is forcibly held on the Imperial fleet flagship and is inclined to marriage under threat by her abductor, the Commander. It is later revealed, that she lost her heart to Captain Pronin.
- The Director (voiced by Aleksandr Pozharov) is the bald, moustached headmaster of the Theatre of Opera and Ballet, clad in a blue jacket and yellow bow. He is looking lyrical bel canto actors for the role of Lensky in Tchaikovsky's opera Eugene Onegin, where fatal accidents allegedly happen to them.

== Development ==
=== Background and concept ===
In 1990, Mikhail Zaitsev conceived to make an animated parody of the first perestroika-born Soviet action films that poorly tried to imitate action films of the West. After calling a rough draft of his idea "Rizhsky Market Productions", he started to design the main character. Zaitsev wanted to find a "pure character of [domestic] popular culture", which was not based on real people, like Vasily Ivanovich and Petka, thus his choice fell on Major Pronin's image from anecdotes, because he was not familiar with Lev Ovalov's original works about the character. A newborn character became a grandson of Major Pronin, and was named Captain Pronin or Superment (Supercop), which is a pun-response to the superheroic image, occupying the then-mass culture field of Russia. According to Zaitsev's co-author Sergey Belorusets, Captain Pronin is a "modern Ivan the Fool", meaning by this a hero of justice, that goes unbeaten through any troubles without killing his opponents, and wittily solves the most complex cases, while remaining a simpleton and a good man.

=== Production ===
The series' creator is Mikhail Zaitsev. He was engaged in the production process as a screenwriter, director, and artist in the first episode, with the help of art directors Rozalia Zelma and Tatyana Abalakina, and, in addition to this, as an art director/animator in the subsequent episodes with the participation of his co-director Rozalia Zelma.

The series' executive producers are L. Varentsova for the first three episodes, with co-executive producer L. Zarita in the first episode, and T. Aristova for the last episode.

As indicated in the closing credits, around 45 people worked together in animating and producing the Captain Pronin series at Studio Ekran in Moscow. Because of the modest budget, the series had 4–5 animators and 8–10 artists in the first two episodes, which was reflected on the quality of its background images—they were poorly drawn or even absent, becoming a kind of a recognizable "feature". Whereas, the last two episodes had 6–5 animators and the number of the art crew had grown to 17–16 people, significantly increasing the animation quality. The series had included various parody characters exported from the West's films, some characters designed using unnatural, bright skin colors, and the title character's visual appearance in the first two episodes was supposedly borrowed from the film actor Arnold Schwarzenegger, most notably his role in Red Heat.

The series has the main cameraman Ernst Gaman, and the different sound engineers Vitaly Azarovsky, Nelly Kudrina, Sergey Kozlov, Oleg Solomonov; and editors Ludmila Ruban, Olga Chekalina (also, a co-editor for the first episode), L. Afanasyeva, and T. Ivankova for each single episode. The script editors are G. Komarova for the first two episodes, and Alice Feodoridi for the last two episodes.

=== Cast ===
The Captain Pronin series has one regular cast member, Igor Vernik, and intermediate members like Vsevolod Abdulov, Rogvold Sukhoverko, and Aleksandr Pozharov, who made significant contributions to voice acting.

Igor Vernik provided the voice of Captain Pronin in all episodes, except Pronin's singing in Captain Pronin 4 with accordion performance of "Aria of Mr. X" from Emmerich Kalman's operetta The Circus Princess.

Vsevolod Abdulov provided the voices of Swistunov, Ninja, James Bond, Major Pronin in Captain Pronin – Major Pronin's Grandson; all characters, except Captain Pronin, in Captain Pronin 2; Navigator, Examination Committee Member, Green Space Pirate, Sirius Soldier in Captain Pronin 3.

Rogvold Sukhoverko provided the voices of the main antagonists, the Chief and the Commander, in Captain Pronin – Major Pronin's Grandson and Captain Pronin 3; and minor characters, as Examination Committee Chairman and Red Space Pirate, in Captain Pronin 3.

Aleksandr Pozharov provided the voices of Myshyakovich in Captain Pronin – Major Pronin's Grandson, and of the Director in Captain Pronin 4.

The female voices were provided by T. Sergeyevna in Captain Pronin – Major Pronin's Grandson, by Lyudmila Ilyina in Captain Pronin 3, and by an uncredited voice actress in Captain Pronin 4.

Also, V. Belov and Vladimir Nikitin (not credited) performed the voice acting for Captain Pronin 4.

=== Music ===
The theme song "Captain Pronin – Superstar" was performed by the Russian band Car-Man, while the lyrics were written by the band's leader, Sergey Lemokh. The song is played over the credits of the whole series, sometimes featuring the voice of Igor Vernik at the end, and in the chase scenes of Captain Pronin 2 and Captain Pronin 3. Besides that, the product placement of Car-Man and Sergey Lemokh appears throughout the series, whereas Segey Lemokh made an animated cameo in Captain Pronin 2.

The series' main composer is Taras Buhevsky, except the third cartoon, Captain Pronin in Space, where the composer is Igor Yefremov.

== Episodes ==
| Year | Title (English) | Original title (Russian) | Directed by | Written by | Running time |
|---|---|---|---|---|---|
| 1992 | Captain Pronin – Major Pronin's Grandson | Капитан Пронин — внук майора Пронина | Mikhail Zaitsev | Mikhail Zaitsev | 9 min 48 sec |
| 1993 | Captain Pronin 2: Captain Pronin in America | Капитан Пронин 2: в Америке (мультбоевик) | Mikhail Zaitsev, Rosalia Zelma | Mikhail Zaitsev | 6 min 23 sec |
| 1993 | Captain Pronin 3: Captain Pronin in Space | Капитан Пронин 3: в космосе (мульттриллер) | Mikhail Zaitsev, Rosalia Zelma | Mikhail Zaitsev | 7 min 6 sec |
| 1994 | Captain Pronin 4: Captain Pronin at the Opera | Капитан Пронин 4: в опере (мультдетектив) | Rosalia Zelma, Mikhail Zaitsev | Mikhail Zaitsev, Rosalia Zelma | 8 min 2 sec |

Besides the main series, Captain Pronin segments had appeared in the last episode, "Puss in Boots", of a 1993 Yunafilm's four-part compilation cartoon, The Return of Leopold the Cat, directed by Rosalia Zelma, Anatoly Reznikov, and Mikhail Zaitsev.

== Reception ==
The Captain Pronin series was rated above average by the audience of the film review portal KinoPoisk, where the first film, Captain Pronin – Major Pronin's Grandson, holds 6.6 out of 10, Captain Pronin 2 holds 6.4 out of 10, Captain Pronin 3 holds 6.2 out of 10, and Captain Pronin 4 holds 5.7 out of 10.

On May 24, 2010, Won James Won's band member Tikhon Kubov compiled a list of 50 Soviet/Russian "weirdness and bizarreness" animated cartoons for the web magazine Сhewbakka. It features the series' second film Captain Pronin in America, which was described by him as a "real trash", and a "[Russian] answer to Police Academy 7: Mission to Moscow".

== Other media ==
=== Book series ===
After the cartoon series, Mikhail Zaitsev in collaboration with Sergey Belorusets wrote a detective parody in prose, Superment – Thrillers About Captain Pronin, with the volume of 18 author's sheets. The literary version of the Captain Pronin's adventures was significantly expanded in comparison to the cartoon, and represents a diverse and multiple genre parody of all manner of detective fiction, which can be considered as three separate works: Thriller About Captain Pronin (7 stories), Kung Fu from Captain Pronin (6 stories) and Combat Tasks of Captain Pronin – Super Tutorial for Troubled Teens (13 stories). The first book of 64 pages with illustrations was published in 1996 under the title Superment – Thrillers About Captain Pronin by the publishing house Tekhnika Molodezhi. The book's introduction was written by detective fiction author Georgy Vayner. The story "Captain Pronin Against Shaolin, or Forty-Eight Hours in the Life of Captain Pronin" from Kung Fu from Captain Pronin was published in the 9th issue of the Writers Union of Moscow's journal Koltso A in 1999. In 2013, the novel Superment, or Reminiscences About Captain Pronin, written by Zaitsev and Belorusets, was published by FTM, with the volume of 268 pages.

=== Video game ===
In 1995, Mikhail Zaitsev wrote the script for a video game about Captain Pronin and contacted a computer company, but had encountered incomprehension in the chosen company and delayed his idea. In June 1997, he took an interest in an advertising insert in the magazine Game.EXE, and contacted the company Izdatelsky Dom Domashny Kompyuter (IDDK). After his proposal was accepted by IDDK, the game was produced by Рavel Krivoruchko, the music was made with the help of composer Taras Buhevsky, the graphics was created by artist Yelena Karavaeva, and the development process took less than three months in total. In September 1997, the interactive fiction game Captain Pronin: One Against All was released for the PC, and later unofficially ported to PlayStation. The adventure quest has 400 endings and 200 animated scenes, its graphics has the similar style as the cartoon series, and the text contains humour, jokes and allusions to various foreign and domestic pop culture references.

=== Home video ===
Krupny Plan released two cartoon compilations, Cartoon Collection 47, on VHS in 1999, and, Film, Film, Film, on DVD in 2006, which feature the complete series of Captain Pronin.
