= Konstantin Savitsky =

Russian painter (1844–1905)

- Константин Савицкий
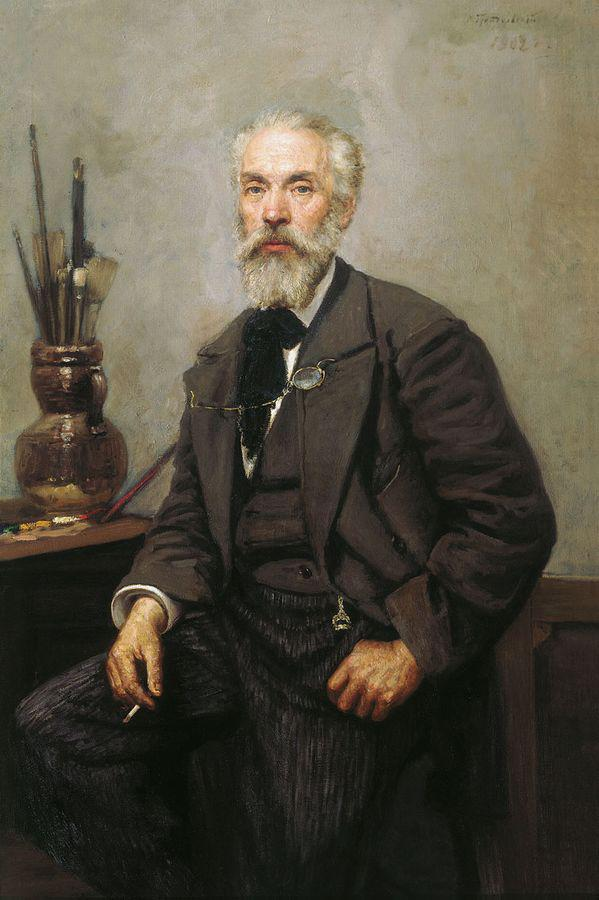
- Portrait by Nikolai Grandkovsky, 1902; Tretyakov Gallery
- Born: May 25, 1844; Taganrog
- Died: January 31, 1905 (aged 60); Penza
- Education: Imperial Academy of Arts (1874)
- Known for: Painting
- Style: Realism
- Movement: Peredvizhniki
- Elected: Full Member Academy of Arts (1895); Member Academy of Arts (1897)

Konstantin Apollonovich Savitsky (Russian: Константи́н Аполло́нович Сави́цкий; 25 May 1844 — 31 January 1905) was a Russian painter in the Realist style, active during Tsars Alexander II through Nicholas II's reigns, primarily known for his genre pictures.

== Early life ==
Born in Frankovka (later known as Baronovka), a village-turned-district of Taganrog, Savitsky was a son of a military medic. Savitsky's family lived in the building of the Taganrog Gymnasium for Boys, where his father worked as a doctor. In Frankovka the family rented a summer house. Savitsky spent his childhood and youth in Taganrog. He showed an interest for painting in early childhood. Being on the shore of Azov Sea with his parents, he loved to make sketches, and drawing lessons at the Gymnasium were his favorite subject.

When Konstantin was fifth-grader at Taganrog Gymnasium, his teenager's life changed unexpectedly. Both of his parents died suddenly. Kostya was taken by his uncle who lived in present-day Latvia and became his guardian. There Savitsky entered a private boarding-school and in 1862 he graduated and left for Saint Petersburg, where he entered The Imperial Academy of Arts in Saint Petersburg. Personal contacts with outstanding representatives of Russian culture – Ilya Repin, Ivan Shishkin, Viktor Vasnetsov, Mark Antokolski, Vladimir Stasov, – had a great influence on the development of the young artist.

== Education and career ==
Soon Savitsky became one of the best students of the Imperial Academy of Arts. His student paintings were awarded with silver medals and for his painting Cain and Abel (1871) he received a gold medal.

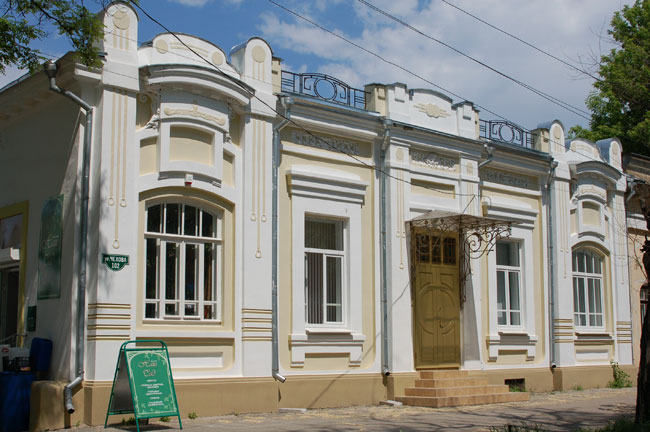
House of Savitsky in Taganrog. © TaganrogCity.Com

After graduation from the Imperial Academy of Arts and two years abroad, the artist became co-partner of mobile art exhibitions (Peredvizhniki), a group of Russian realist artists who in protest at academic restrictions formed an artists' cooperative, which evolved into the Society for Traveling Art Exhibitions in 1870. The artwork Repairing Railway was one of the first paintings of that time dedicated to the life of the working class.

His own works aside, Savitsky is remembered, albeit quite recently, as the co-author of the famous painting Morning in the Pine Forest. On the original Peredvizhniki exhibition the painting was shown by two authors Ivan Shishkin and Konstantin Savitsky. It was assumed that Savitsky had painted the bears and Shishkin the forest but later the scholars found that preparational drawings of the pine forest were made by both Savitsky and Shishkin. Later Savitsky withdrew his signature from the painting and it is currently attributed solely to Shishkin.

The titles of his artworks – Lost all their possessions in the fire, To the War, Herdsmen, Krutchnik, Argument at the Bound – speak about the direction of his art.

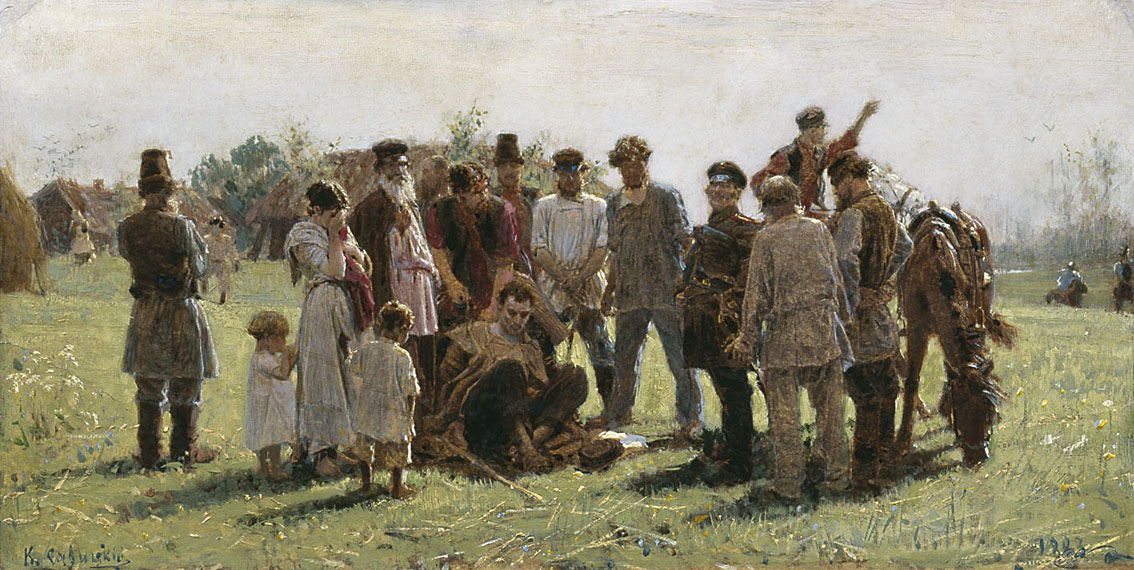
The Fugitive, 1883

After graduation from the Imperial Academy of Arts the artist dedicated more than 20 years to teaching arts in the art schools of Moscow, Saint Petersburg and Penza; including the Moscow School of Painting, Sculpture and Architecture. In 1897 Konstantin Savitsky became a member of the Imperial Academy of Arts.

== Works ==
His famous artworks are Repairing the Railroad, Morning in a Pine Forest, To the War, Inok, Travellers in Auvergne, Ikon on the Road & many more. "To War" is a huge painting that took ten years to complete.

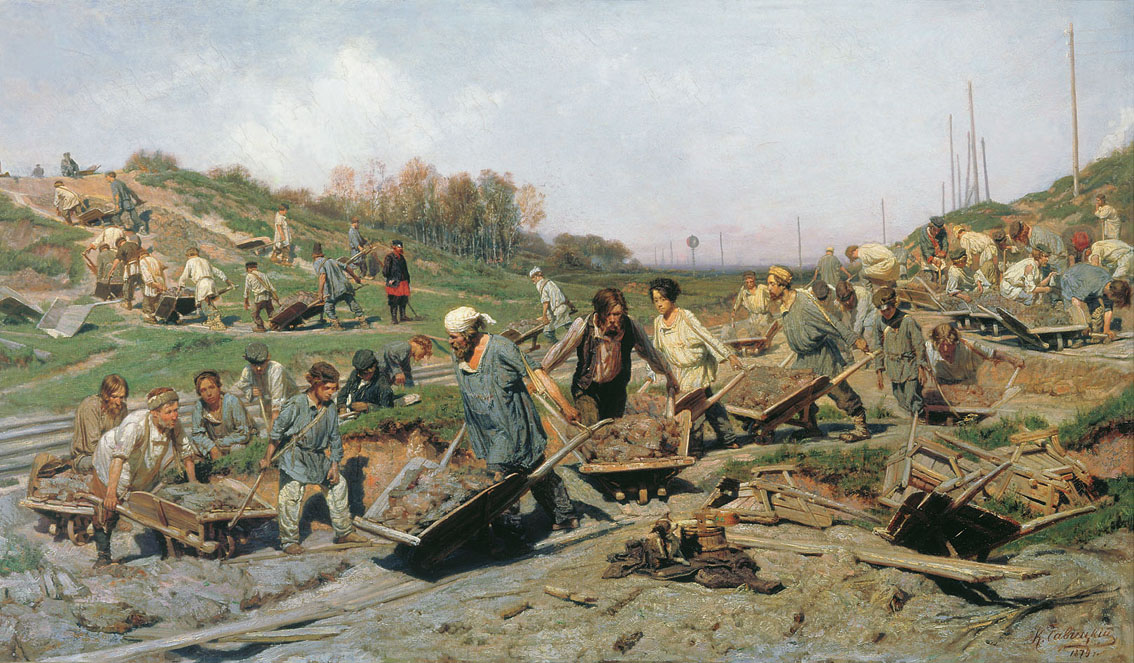
Repair Work on the Railway by Konstantin Savitsky (1874), Tretyakov Gallery collection

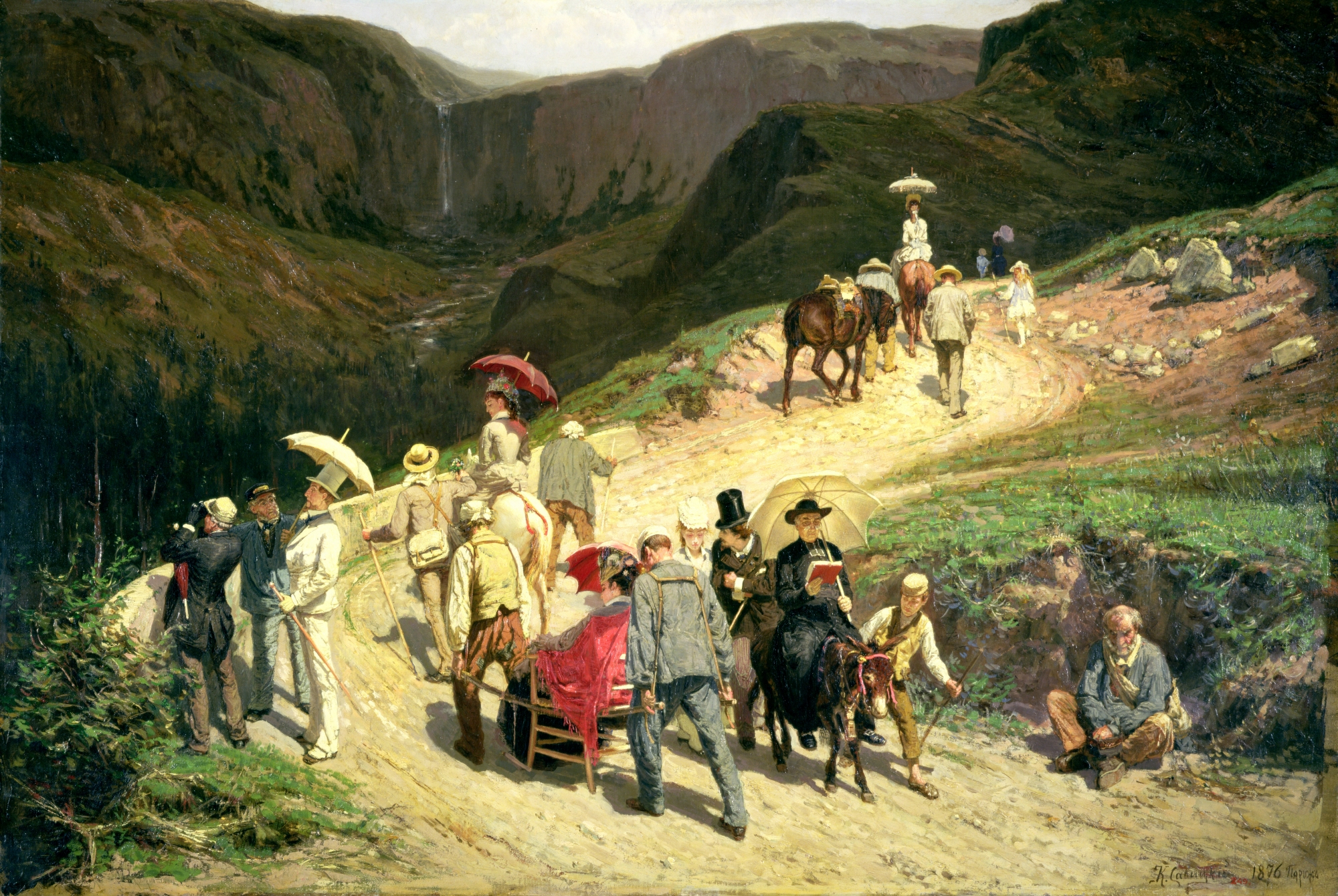
Travellers in Auvergne (1876) by Konstantin Savitsky, Russian Museum collection

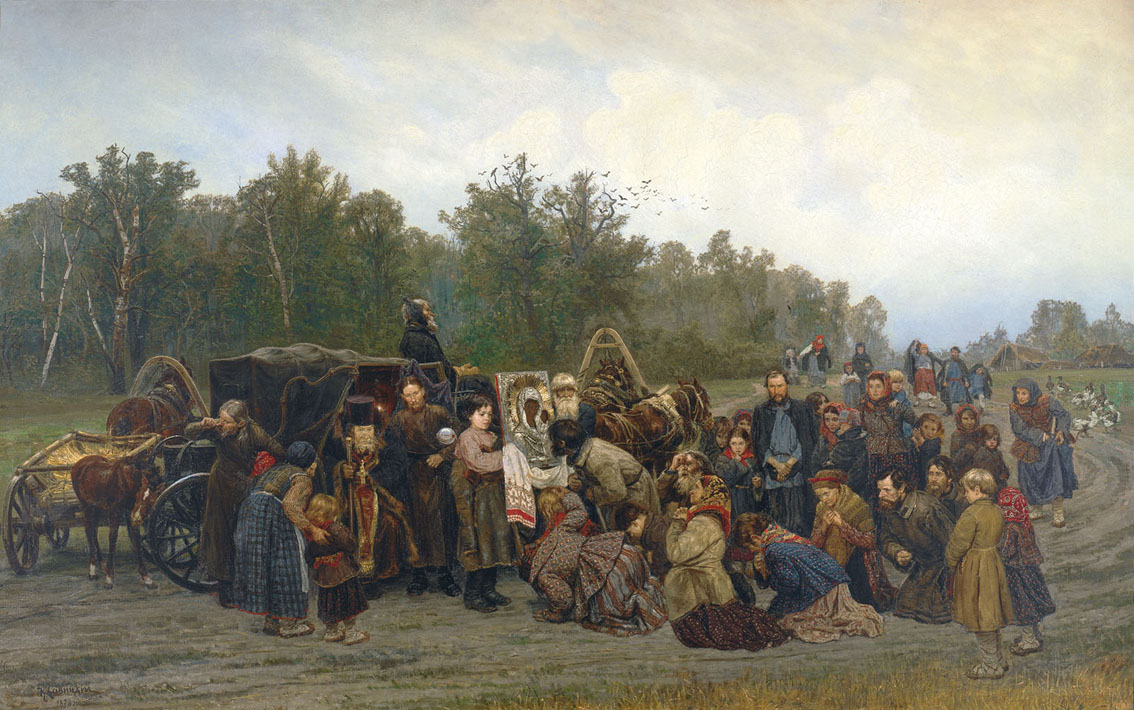
Ikon on the road (1878), Tretyakov Gallery

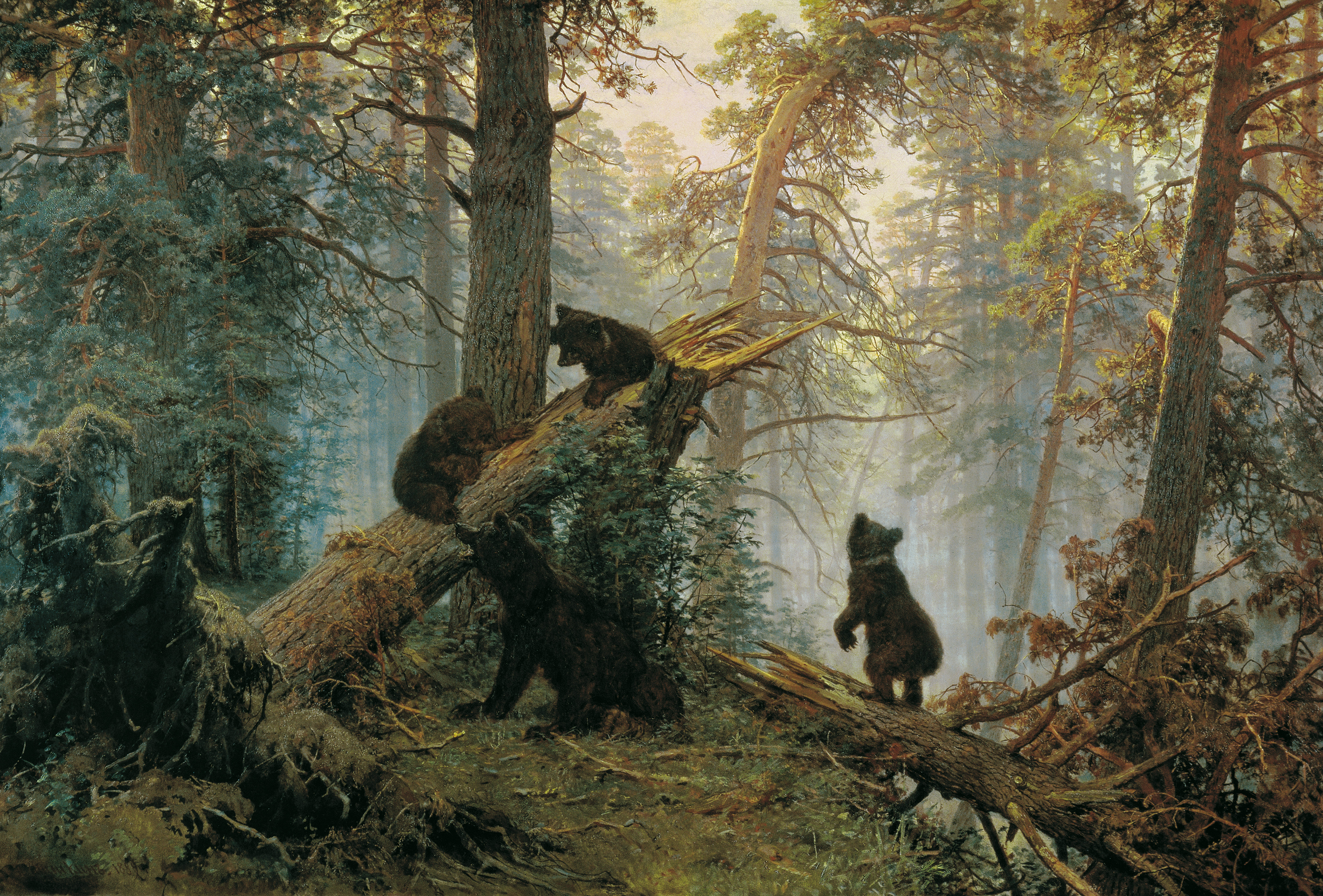
Savitsky painted the bears on Shishkin's landscape Morning in a Pine Forest (1886). Tretyakov Gallery

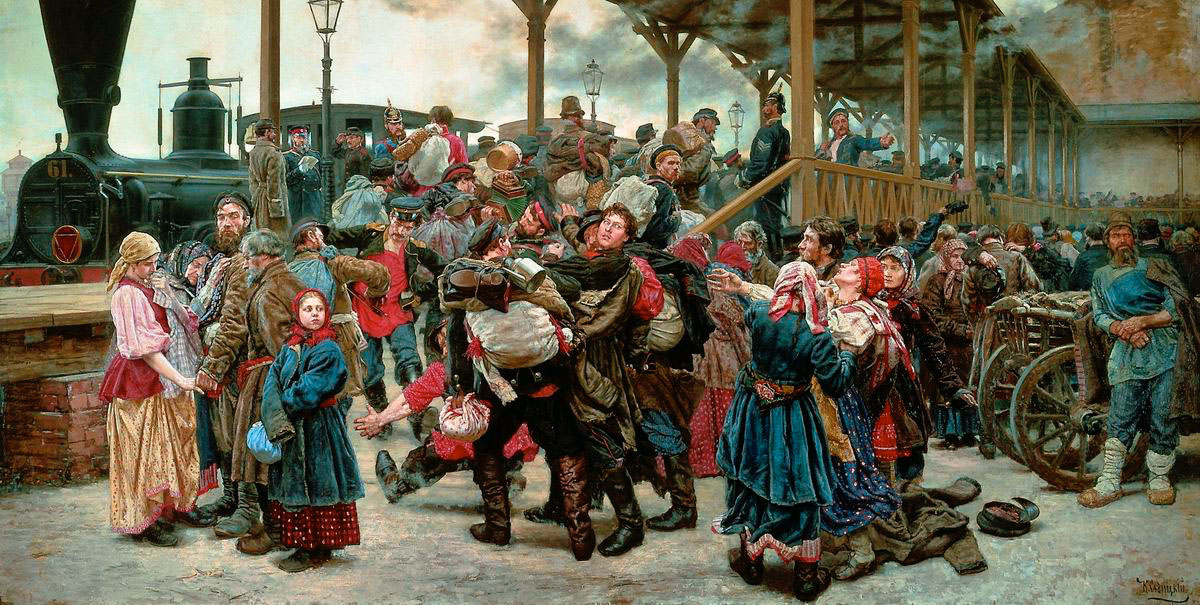
To War by Konstantin Savitsky (1888), Russian Museum

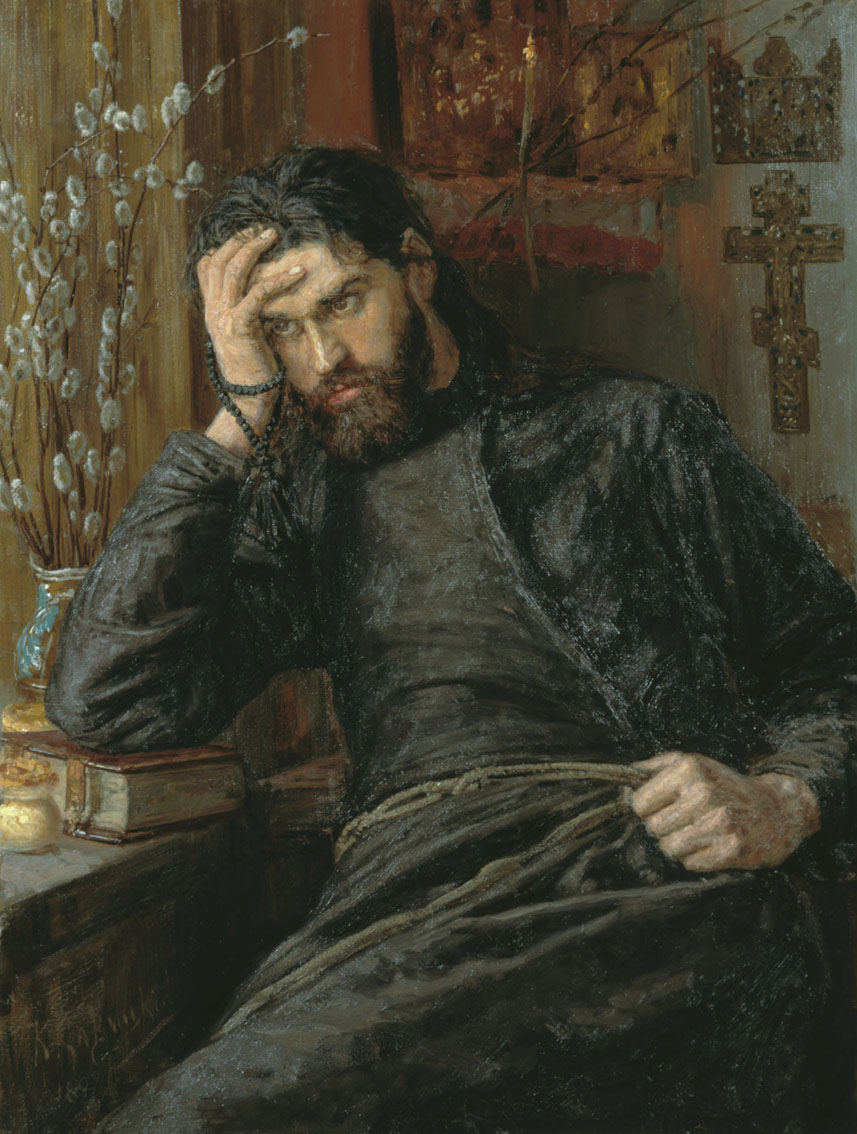
Inok (1897), Penza Savitsky Art Gallery

== See also ==
- List of Russian artists
