= Welcoming the Icon =

1878 painting by Russian artist Konstantin Savitsky

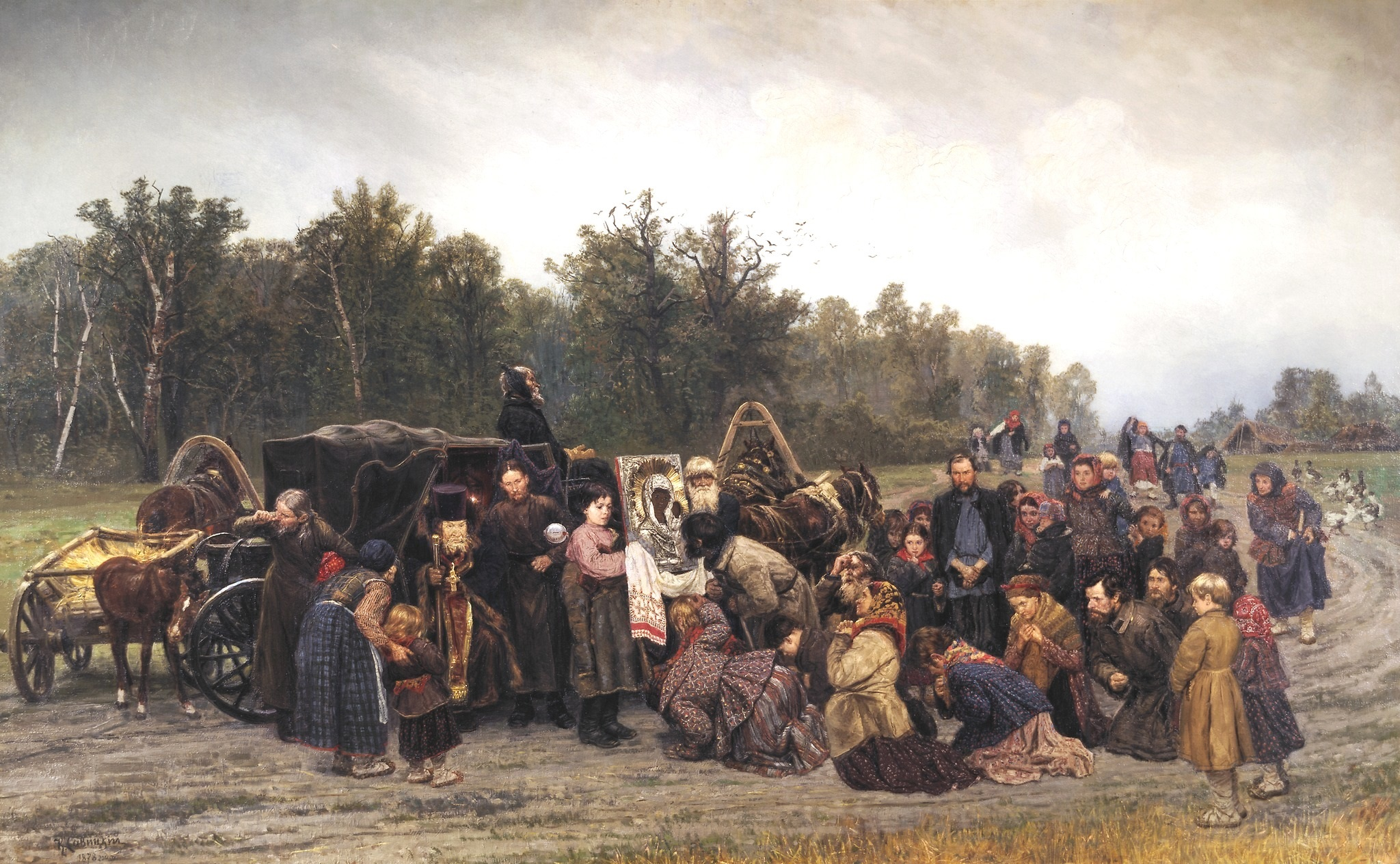
- Artist: Konstantin Savitsky
- Year: 1878
- Medium: Oil on canvas
- Dimensions: 141 cm × 228 cm (56 in × 90 in)
- Location: State Tretyakov Gallery, Moscow

Welcoming the Icon (Russian: Встреча иконы) is a painting by Russian artist Konstantin Savitsky (1844–1905), which was completed in 1878. It is stored in the State Tretyakov Gallery in Moscow (Inventory No. 591). The size of the painting is 141 × 228 cm. This painting is a multi-figure genre canvas that represents an episode of peasant life and was painted during the Russo-Turkish War of 1877–1878. Savitsky worked on it in Daugavpils.

It was presented at the 6th exhibition of the Society for Travelling Art Exhibitions (Peredvizhniki), opened in St. Petersburg in March 1878, and in May of the same year it was moved to Moscow, Savitsky's work made a good impression and was purchased by Pavel Tretyakov.

According to the art critic Vladimir Stasov, the painting Welcoming the Icon is full of "such content, such types, and such truth that make it one of the most significant and important creations of the New Russian School". The artist and critic Alexander Benois wrote that Welcoming the Icon is "the most 'ace' thing by Savitsky," and one of the most characteristic anti-clerical works of Russian artists. Art historian Sophia Goldstein noted that in the painting Welcoming the Icon, Savitsky's talent as an "artist of the folk theme," who was able to "come close to understanding the complex psychology of the people," was fully revealed; in her opinion, this picture "unequivocally placed Savitsky in the ranks of the leading artists of the period".

== History ==
=== Previous events and the work on painting ===
From 1862 to 1873 (with interruptions), Konstantin Savitsky studied at the Imperial Academy of Arts in the class of history painting, where his mentors were Fyodor Bruni, Alexei Markov, and Pavel Chistyakov. In 1871, Savitsky was awarded the Small Gold Medal of the Academy of Arts for his program Cain and Abel. That same year, he became a scholarship holder of Emperor Alexander II.

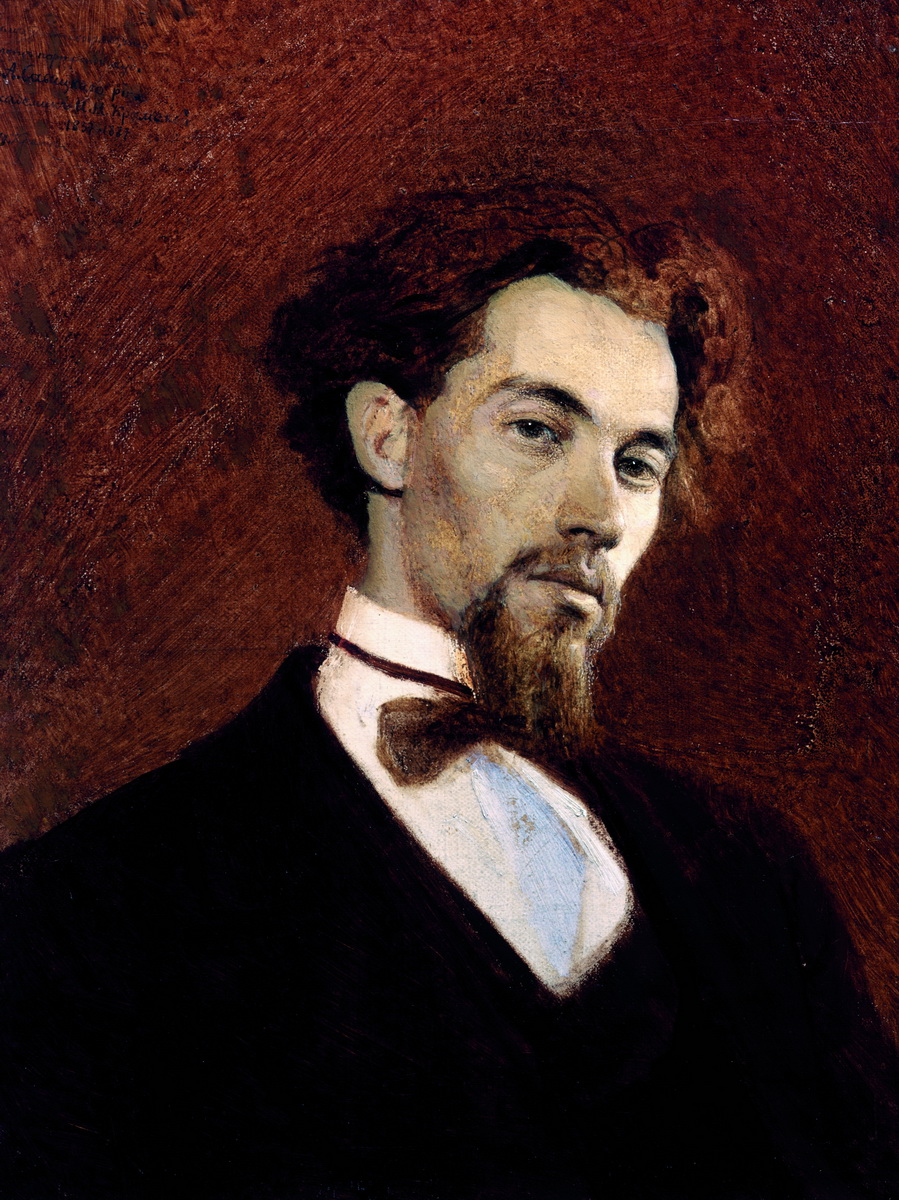
I. N. Kramskoy. Portrait of K. Savitsky (1871)

In the early 1870s, Savitsky began to establish closer ties with members of the Peredvizhniki movement, whose first exhibition opened in January 1871. Two of Savitsky's paintings were exhibited at the second exhibition of the movement, which opened in December 1872. The leadership of the Academy of Arts perceived the success of the traveling exhibitions with irritation and apprehension. Using a formal excuse (a violation of the academic statute, which prohibited students from participating in exhibitions of other organizations) at a meeting held on January 26, 1873, (Note: The Julian calendar (“old style”) is used to date events that took place in the Russian Empire.) the Academy's Council expelled Savitsky from the Academy's pupils. He was thus deprived of the right to compete for a large gold meda, and also lost his chance for a retirement trip abroad.

From the summer of 1873, Savitsky worked on the painting Repair Work on the Railway, completing it in early 1874. The painting was presented at the 3rd exhibition of the Association of Traveling Art Exhibitions, which opened in St. Petersburg in January 1874. Savitsky's work was highly praised by viewers and critics, and it was purchased by Pavel Tretyakov.

On the proceeds from the sale of the painting, Savitsky managed to make a foreign trip in 1874–1876 (with interruptions), during which he lived and worked in Poland, Germany, and France. In February 1875, Savitsky's family suffered a misfortune: his wife, Ekaterina Vasilyevna, committed suicide (it is believed that the cause of the tragedy was unfounded jealousy). To distract himself from his heavy thoughts, Savitsky returned to Russia, spent some time with relatives in Daugavpils, and visited St. Petersburg. In May 1875, he returned to Paris, but in July of that year, he left again for Russia, where he remained until the fall. Upon his return to Paris, Savitsky spent most of his time working on the canvas Travelers in the Auvergne, which he completed in 1876. In letters to relatives, the artist wrote that he was "torn with all my soul from the beautiful places here" and that only in his homeland would he be able to realize many of his plans.

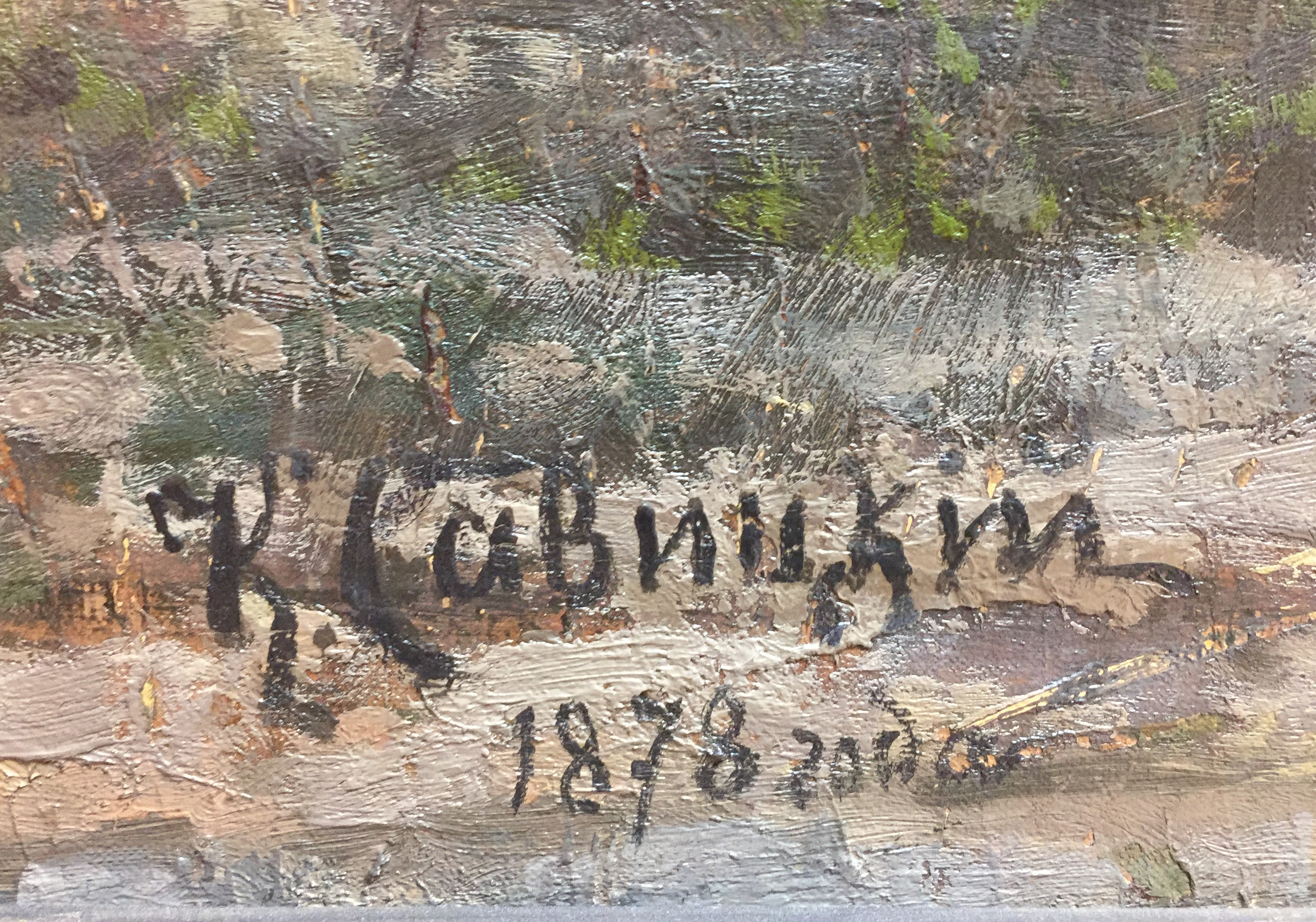
Savitsky's signature and date on the painting Welcoming the Icon

In the summer of 1876, Savitsky finally returned to Russia and settled in Dinaburg, where his sister's family lived. There, he completed the painting Courtyard in Normandy, begun in France, and also began work on genre paintings of peasant life, among which were I Liked Her (I Would Ask, but I'm Afraid), Goats, and Fireburnt (Fire in the Village). To earn a living, Savitsky also collaborated with illustrated magazines such as Vsemirnaya Illyustratsiya, Pchela, Khudozhestvenniy Zhurnal, and others. In April 1877, the Russo-Turkish War broke out, during which Savitsky's sister's husband, Officer Sazanovich, was killed. In response to these events, Savitsky created his next major works: Welcoming the Icon (1878) and To War (the first version finished in 1880, the second in 1888). It is probable, that in 1877 and early 1878, the artist devoted most of his creative efforts to working on the canvas Welcoming the Icon, but no reliable information about this activity has survived. The author of the 1959 monograph on Savitsky’s life and work, Elena Levenfish, wrote: "By a strange, inexplicable coincidence of circumstances, no information about the artist’s work on this idea has survived. It is difficult to imagine that, in this case, he changed his creative method and worked without preparatory studies with models and sketches. However, up to the present time, it has not been possible to find either artistic or written evidence of Savitsky’s work on this canvas".

=== 6th Travelling exhibition and next events ===
The painting Welcoming the Icon was completed in early 1878. Together with two other works by Savitsky, Courtyard in Normandy and Travellers in Auvergne, Welcoming the Icon was exhibited at the 6th exhibition of the Association of Itinerant Art Exhibitions, which opened on March 9, 1878, in St. Petersburg and moved to Moscow in May of the same year. The St. Petersburg portion of the exhibition was held in the building of the Society for the Encouragement of Arts, while the Moscow department took place in the premises of the Imperial Society for the Encouragement of the Arts. Directly from the exhibition, the painting was purchased from the artist by Pavel Tretyakov for two thousand rubles. In November 1878, the 6th Traveling Exhibition continued its journey to other cities of the Russian Empire, which ended in April 1879. During this time, the exhibition visited Riga (November–December), Vilna (December–January), Kyiv (January–February), Odessa (February–March), and Kharkiv (March–April).

In general, the painting received good reviews from viewers and critics. The artist Pavel Chistyakov, in a letter to Pavel Tretyakov, noted that at the traveling exhibition “there were good paintings,” of which he particularly liked Drought by Grigory Myasoedov, Welcoming the Icon by Konstantin Savitsky, Prisoner by Nikolai Yaroshenko, and Rye by Ivan Shishkin. In the article The Traveling Exhibition of 1878, published at the end of March 1878 in the newspaper Novoe Vremya, art critic Vladimir Stasov gave a detailed description of Welcoming the Icon, noting that this canvas seemed to him "the most significant painting at the exhibition". After reading this article, Leo Tolstoy became interested in the paintings Drought and Welcoming the Icon; in a letter to Stasov on April 6, 1878, he wrote: “Your feuilleton at least a little corrected the matter that I did not have time to be at the exhibition—gave me a concept of it, but the more regrettable that I did not see the paintings by Myasoedov and Savitsky. The content of these paintings is interesting to me...”

At the same time, there were critical reviews of Welcoming the Icon in the press. Particularly, in the newspaper Moscovskiye Vedomosti (No. 145 for June 10, 1878), the image of the priest was interpreted negatively and referred to as a "pathological type". Discussing Savitsky's work, one of the critics wrote: "Under the influence of the real direction in art in recent times, we have come into fashion to portray clerics perhaps prosaically... We dare to think that this is a big mistake". In a letter to the artist Ivan Kramskoi dated May 9, 1878, Pavel Tretyakov described the situation as follows: "There are different opinions about Savitsky, but people mostly like the Icon, except for the priest, who is unanimously attacked".

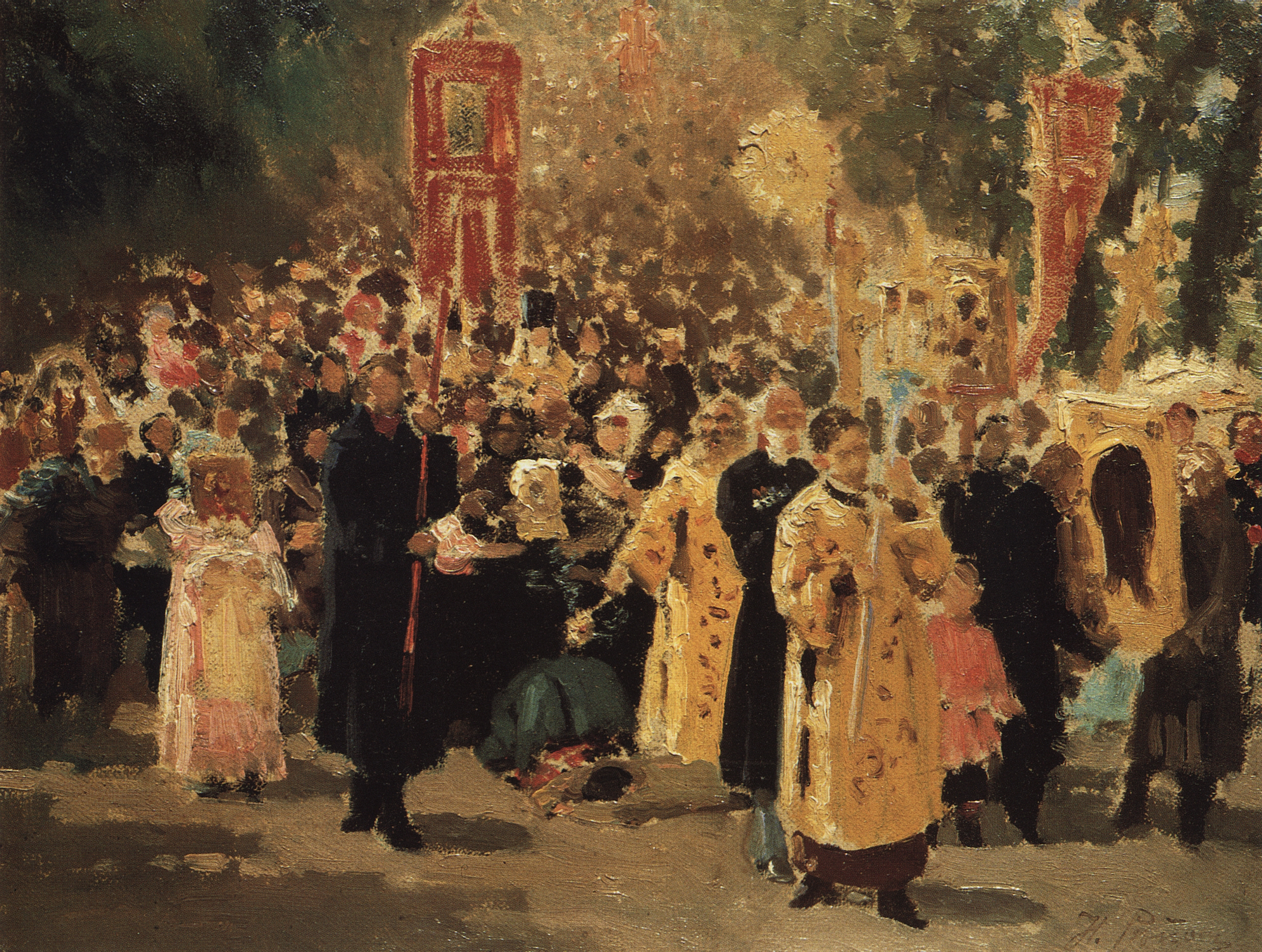
I. Е. Repin. Religious Procession in an Oak Wood. The Revealed Icon (sketch, 1878, State Tretyakov Gallery)

During the same period when Savitsky was creating Welcoming the Icon, the artist Ilya Repin undertook to develop the theme of the procession of the cross. In 1877, he wrote the so-called “initial sketch” of the painting The Procession of the Cross (now in the Russian State Museum), and in 1877–1878, he began work on a second version, which is associated with the 1878 sketch The Procession of the Cross in the Oak Forest. Savitsky's painting, which Repin saw at the traveling exhibition, pleased him very much. Although, according to some reports, Ilya Efimovich did not rule out the possibility that Savitsky borrowed the idea from him, as he did not keep his work secret. Given the similarity of the subjects, Repin decided to suspend work on his Procession of the Cross in the Oak Forest. The artist Ivan Kramskoy, who tried to change Repin's mind, wrote to him in a letter dated May 9, 1878: "...as for Savitsky, I will say one thing: I am not blind, thank God, and I understand what there is in this picture and what you rejoice in, but I do not share your sacrifice: stopping your painting". In the end, Repin continued to work on the theme of the procession—between 1880 and 1883, he wrote Religious Procession in Kursk Governorate, and in the 1890s, he returned to the subject "in the oak forest".

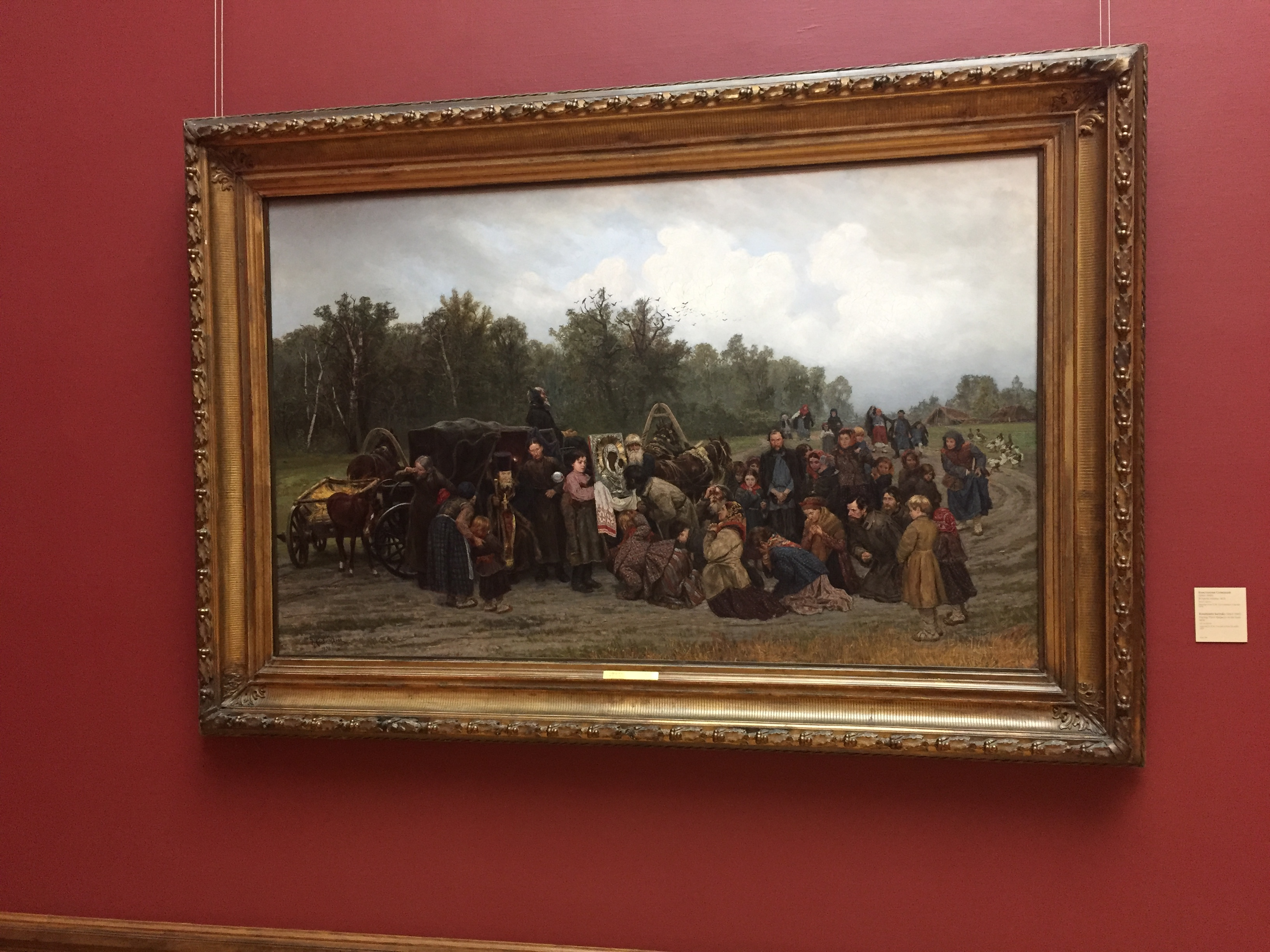
Welcoming the Icon in State Tretyakov Gallery

One of the painting's weaknesses, noted even by those who generally spoke very well of it, was a certain dullness of the coloring. Despite the fact that the canvas had already been purchased by Pavel Tretyakov, Savitsky decided to continue working on it, resulting in his staying in St. Petersburg until early summer. Upon learning of the artist's intention to make corrections to the painting, Tretyakov expressed concern but insisted on his own position. In a letter dated April 25, 1878, Savitsky wrote to Tretyakov: "I repeat to you, much respected Pavel Mikhailovich, that I make all the corrections to the painting with the deepest conviction of extreme necessity. I recognize them as so essential for this work that, as I told you before, I would not agree to do without them. And therefore, I think that your fear that the painting has not been spoiled is, for me, your shyness, which, forgive me, does not convince me, even because you yourself once agreed with my arguments".

In 1893, while working in the Tretyakov Gallery on a variant of Welcoming the Icon at the request of the collector and patron of art Ivan Tsvetkov, Savitsky once again tried to adjust the color of the copied canvas. However, this attempt almost led to a serious quarrel with Tretyakov, who strongly disliked when artists tried to change anything in paintings that had already entered his gallery. This is likely the same episode recounted by Nikolai Mudrogel, the longtime curator of the Tretyakov Gallery. He recalled that some time after Welcoming the Icon appeared in the gallery, the white clouds depicted in it "began to tear", and cracks appeared on the surface of the paint layer, which grew over time. Tretyakov contacted Savitsky, who promised to correct the defects. While in the gallery during Pavel Mikhailovich's absence, the author of the canvas went over the clouds with a brush, resulting in a pinkish hue that Tretyakov did not like. According to Mudrogel, "Tretyakov, as soon as he saw such a correction, demanded turpentine and immediately washed off the new paint applied to the clouds, leaving white with craquelures". After that, the painting remained in this form.

Subsequently, the painting Welcoming the Icon was exhibited at several exhibitions held in the USSR. In 1955, it was presented at Savitsky's personal exhibition dedicated to the 50th anniversary of the artist's death (the exhibition was held at the Tretyakov Gallery in Moscow). In 1971–1972, the canvas participated in the exhibitions Peredvizhniki in the State Tretyakov Gallery (Moscow) and Domestic Painting of the Peredvizhniki (Leningrad, Kyiv, Minsk), timed to coincide with the centenary of the Peredvizhniki movement.

== Plot, characters and composition ==
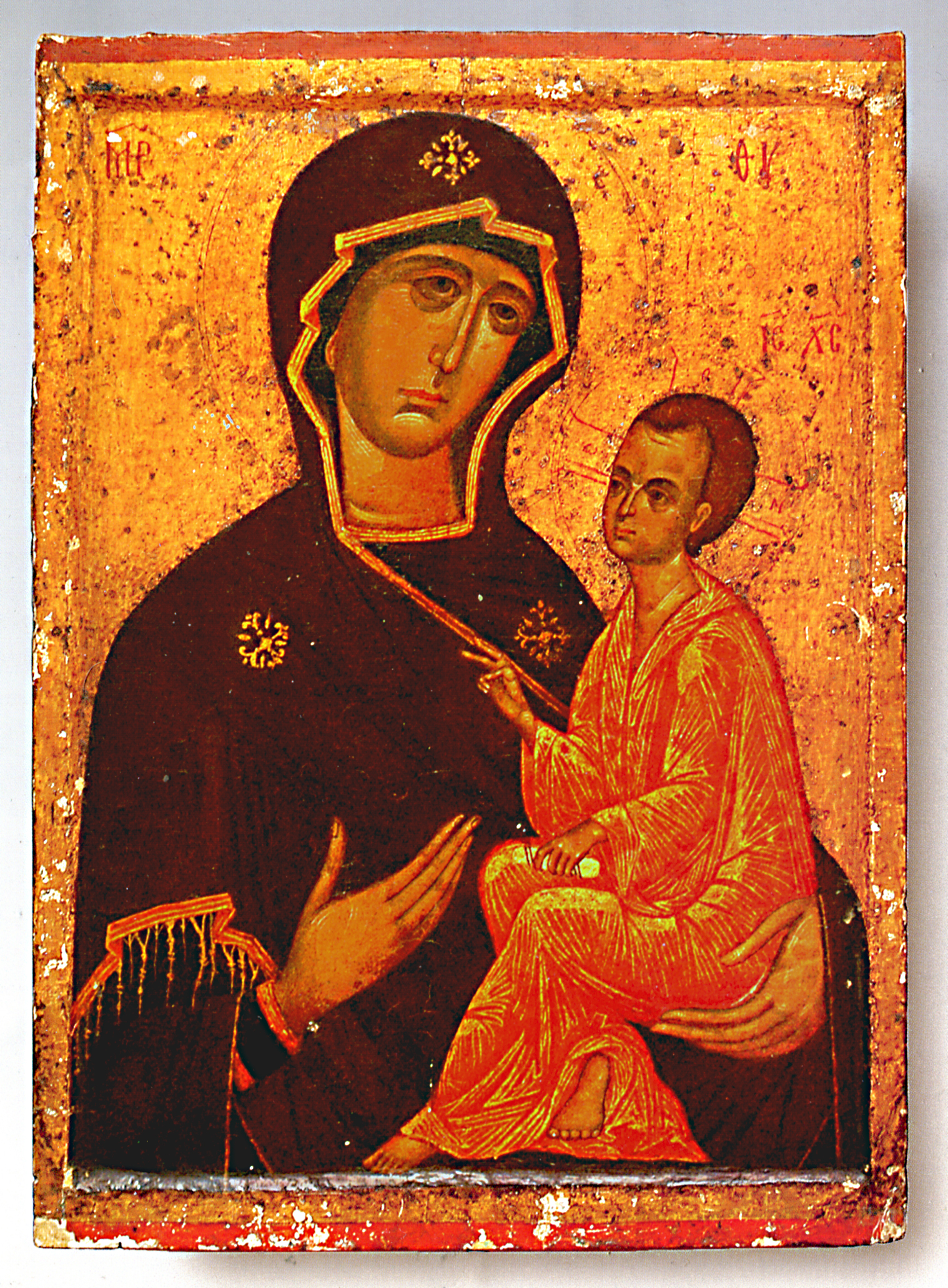
Theotokos of Tikhvin icon without oklad

On a country road at the edge of the forest, a passing tarantass stopped with a miraculous icon, which, at the request of peasants from a neighboring village, was brought out for viewing and veneration. The icon, on an embroidered towel, is held by a gray-haired old man and a boy in a pink shirt. The icon is located in the compositional center of the canvas. To the right of the icon are men and women praying diligently, while other peasants are hurriedly approaching from the village. To the left of the icon are the persons accompanying it, including an elderly priest, two deacons, and a coachman sitting on the coach. Next to the priest, with their backs to the viewer, stand a red-haired girl and her grandmother.

The brightest point of the painting is the icon of the Mother of God, enclosed in a silver frame with golden halos. According to some assumptions, the icon depicted by Savitsky could be one of the copies of the wonderworking Theotokos of Tikhvin, which is an iconographic subtype of the hodegetria (the icon itself did not leave the walls of the Dormition Monastery until 1883).

The priest, climbing out of the carriage and supported by one of the sextons, is dressed in a purple kalimavkion and a red, gold-embroidered epitrachelion, over which is thrown a black fox-fur coat. His face is puffy, with small eyes and a sparse beard, making an unpleasant impression. According to Elena Levenfish, “the decrepit priest with an unpleasant face is devoid of any attractive features". The sexton assisting the priest has a distracted and bored look. Nevertheless, he has not forgotten to bring his donation mug, which he clutches with his free hand. The other sexton, who is at the rear of the carriage, is sniffing tobacco.

It is noticeable that there are almost no young men among the peasants — at the time of the painting, the Russo-Turkish War was underway, and many of them had been conscripted into the army. In the crowd are elderly peasants, children, and soldiers' wives, who hope that bowing before the miraculous icon will help their loved ones involved in the fighting. An old woman in a multicolored shugai bent down in a deep bow; behind her back, looking at the icon with compassion, a woman in a yellow patterned kerchief is kneeling, and to her right, a young peasant woman with a kerchief bunched up on her shoulders is crying. In the background, a gray-bearded old man is crossing himself, and next to him, a bearded man in a gray greatcoat —apparently a retired soldier—is leaning against the icon.

In the crowd of peasants, a standing man stands out. Elena Levenfish wrote that "the alienation of this man, his reflection on what is happening, makes the viewer think, and before him, as if the thoughts and feelings of individual people are revealed and, merging together, appear as a common national disaster". Art historian Dmitry Sarabianov noted that Savitsky sought to “highlight this figure, emphasize it, make it the main character in a multi-voiced 'chorus' of peasants". The artist wanted to differ him showing "his intellectuality". Some researchers believe that this man is not a peasant and accidentally appeared here — an intellectual-raznochinets or rural teacher. According to art historian Zinaida Zonova, "the look of this man as if reveals, explains the attitude of Savitsky himself to this phenomenon".

Fragments of the painting Welcoming the Icon

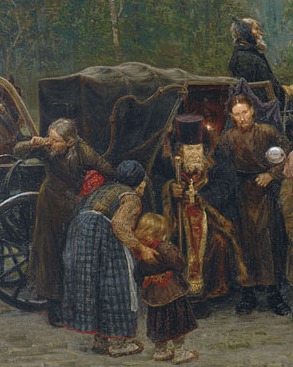
Priest, clerks, coachman and grandmother and daughter

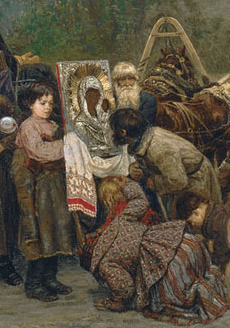
An old man and a boy with an icon and praying peasants

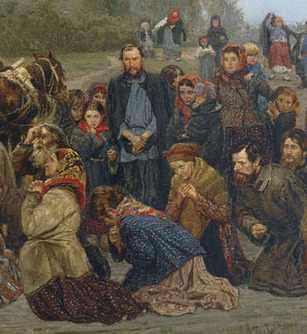
A standing man and praying peasants

The crowd of people surrounding the icon in Savitsky's painting does not form the natural wide semicircle that would be expected in reality. Instead, it is broken, creating an open space in the foreground between the figures of the grandmother and granddaughter on the left side of the painting, as well as a boy and a girl at the right edge of the canvas. The line of the treetops in the background corresponds to the "waving rhythm" of the peasants, who are alternately straightening up or sinking to the ground. The rural landscape, "characterized by a subtle poeticism", is in harmonious connection with the depicted people. The unity of tonality, corresponding to a cloudy summer day, is combined with the great coloristic richness of the canvas.

== Repetition and sketch ==
A variant of the painting Welcoming the Icon, which Savitsky worked on in 1893 at the Tretyakov Gallery, is kept in the Astrakhan Picture Gallery named after P. M. Dogadin (canvas, oil, 40.8 × 59.8 cm; according to other data, 41 × 60 cm, 1893, inv. Zh-387). The Tula Regional Art Museum houses a sketch for this version of the painting, titled Bogomolka (canvas, oil, 34.5 × 26.5 cm; according to other data, 34 × 27 cm, 1893, inv. Zh-334). It depicts Tatiana Nikitichna Tsvetkova, the mother of Ivan Tsvetkov, whose collection previously included this sketch and a variant from the Astrakhan Picture Gallery. After finishing work on the variant, Savitsky told Tsvetkov: "The painting is finished, or at least I don't find anything to improve in it". In sending the sketch, the artist wrote: "I send the frame and portrait — the sketch of your mother, for the good memory of the author, who will, on occasion, bring the portrait in order to sign it".

Repetition and sketch

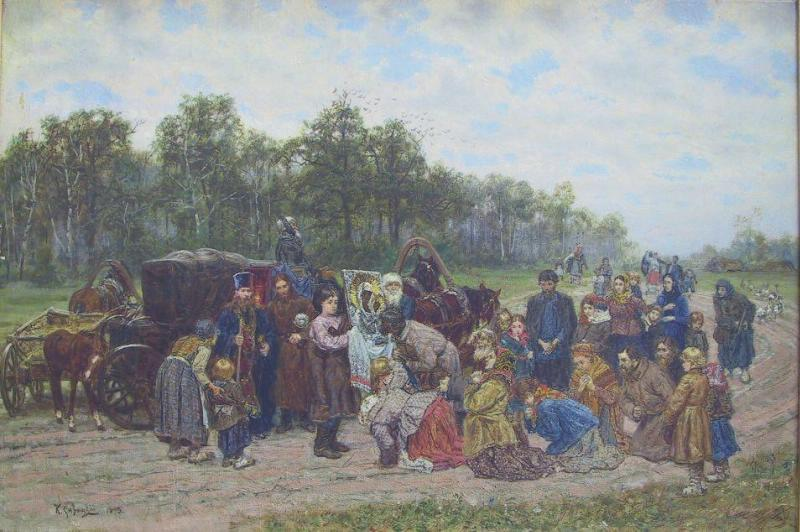
Welcoming the Icon (author's version-repeat, 1893, Astrakhan Picture Gallery of P. M. Dogadin)

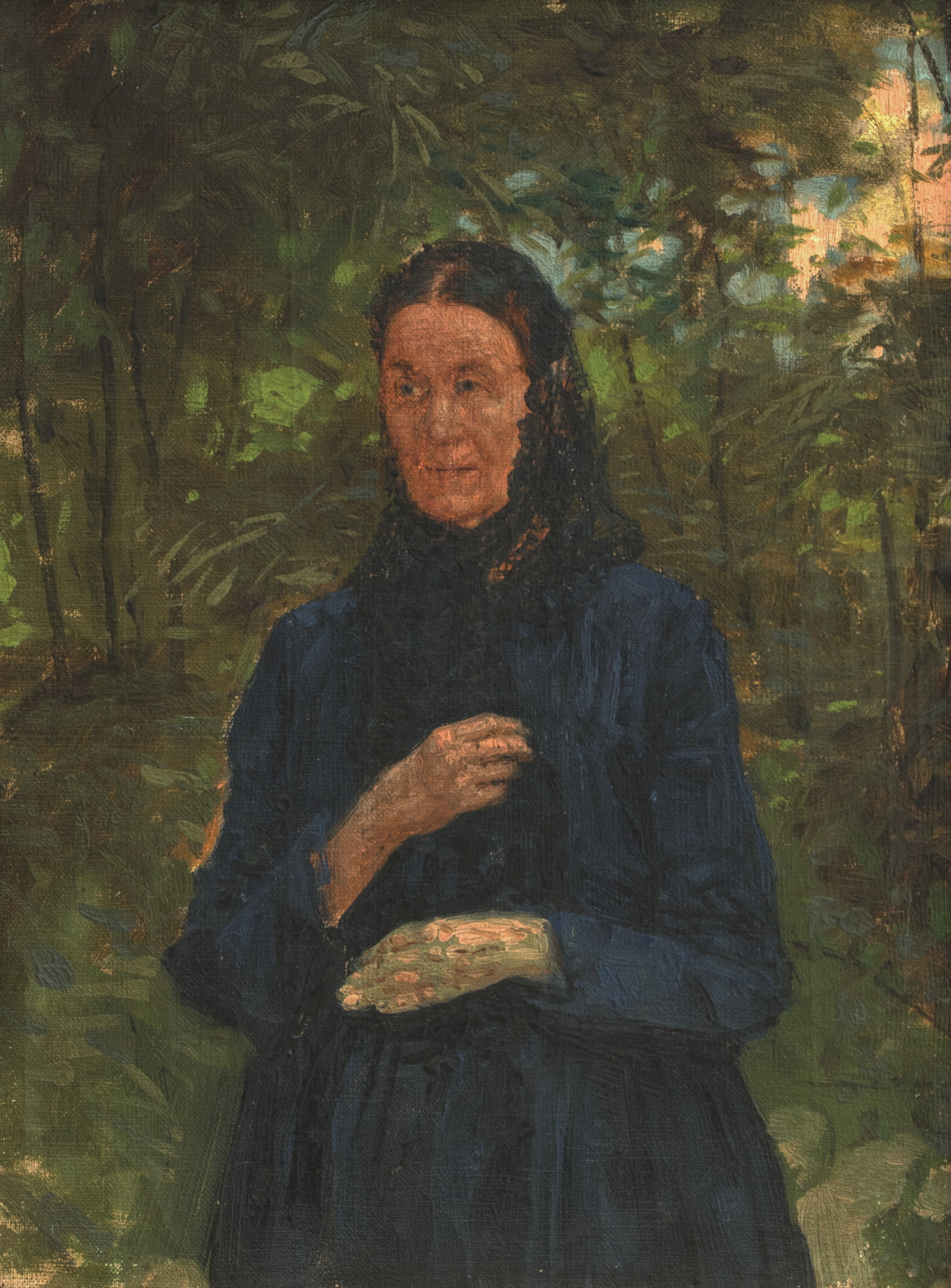
A prayer woman (sketch, 1893, Tula Regional Art Museum)

== Reviews and critics ==
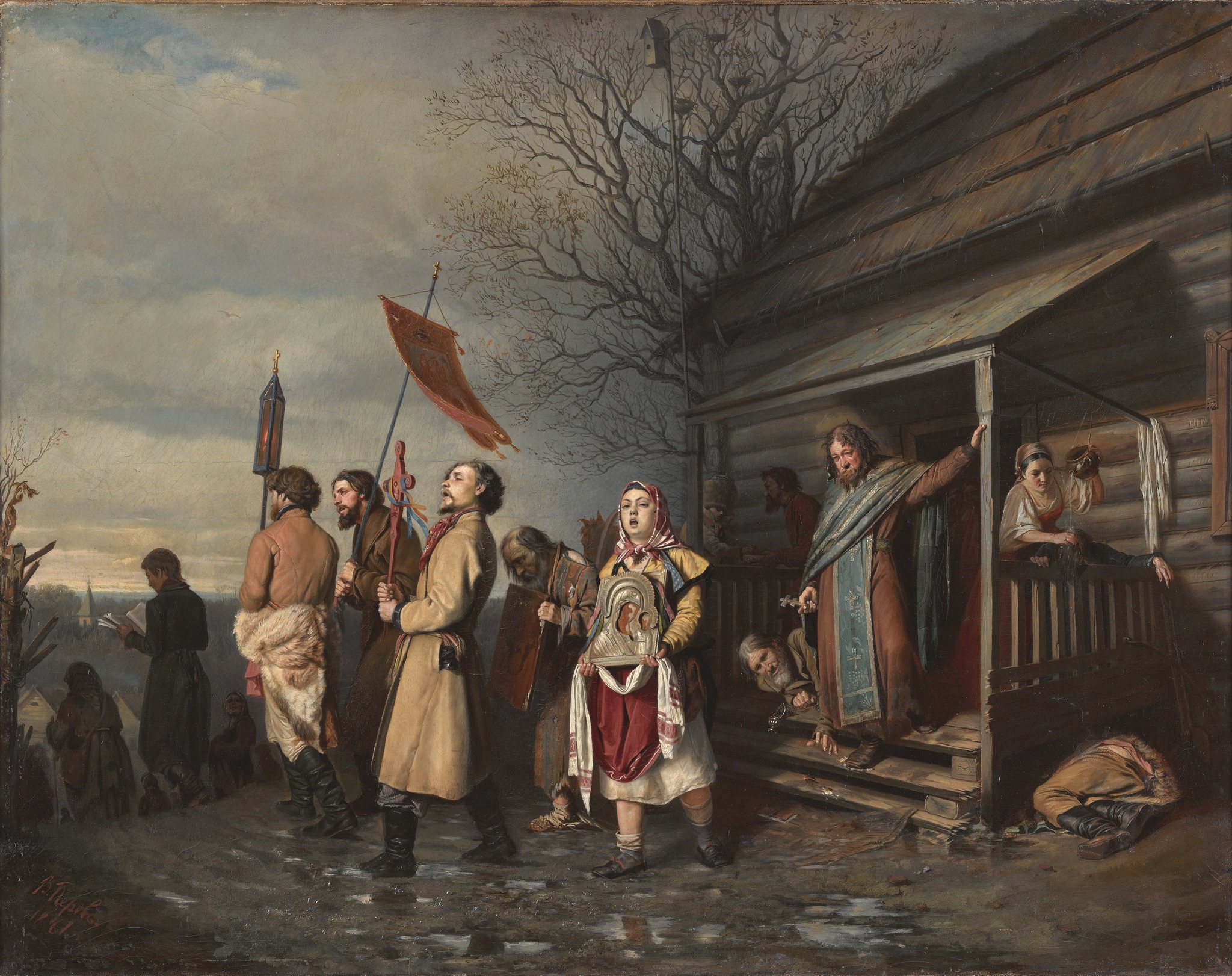
V. G. Perov. An Easter procession in a Russian village (1861, State Tretyakov Gallery)

In a review article about the 6th Travelling Exhibition, art critic Vladimir Stasov wrote that Welcoming the Icon was the best picture by Savitsky, in which he made such a step forward that it was difficult to expect after such “dry and soulless pictures from nature", such as Repair Work on the Railroad (1874). According to Stasov, Savitsky presented a painting at the Travelling Exhibition, "although again large, but excellent, although dirty and gray in color, but full of such content, such types, and such truth, which make it one of the most significant and important creations of the new Russian school". In an article published in 1883, Twenty-five Years of Russian Art, Stasov also gave high praise to Welcoming the Icon, ranking it among the best examples of "choral" paintings of the Russian school of painting (“choral” referred to canvases depicting multifigure scenes from folk life, presenting a variety of types and characters, but "there is no single protagonist").

The artist and critic Alexander Benois, in the book History of Russian Painting in the 19th Century, the first edition of which was published in 1902, wrote that Welcoming the Icon, which appeared at the exhibition in 1878, is considered "the best work that Savitsky has ever done". According to Benois, this canvas can be considered alongside other paintings by Russian artists ridiculing the clergy — Tea in Mytishchi and Rural Procession at Easter by Vasily Perov, Procession in Kursk Province and Before Confession by Ilya Repin, and so on. According to Benois, Savitsky's Welcoming the Icon is "one of the most characteristic works of this anticlerical kind".

Comparing Welcoming the Icon with Vasily Perov's Rural Procession at Easter, painted in 1861, art historian Alexei Fedorov-Davydov wrote that this comparison allows us to "clearly see what a big step forward in the depiction of village life the Itinerant movement made in a short period of time" and how much more complex, richer, and diverse rural realities are shown in Savitsky's work. Fedorov-Davydov noted that Welcoming the Icon also demonstrates Savitsky's increased pictorial skill—the artist uses a beautiful and rich range of colors with subtle shades, and the “beautifully painted landscape” is not just a background but includes the whole scene, with the connection of figures to the landscape achieved through richer means of tonal painting than in Savitsky's previous works. According to Fedorov-Davydov, the further development of what Savitsky achieved in Welcoming the Icon can be seen in Ilya Repin's Religious Procession in Kursk Governorate and in the works of Vasily Surikov.

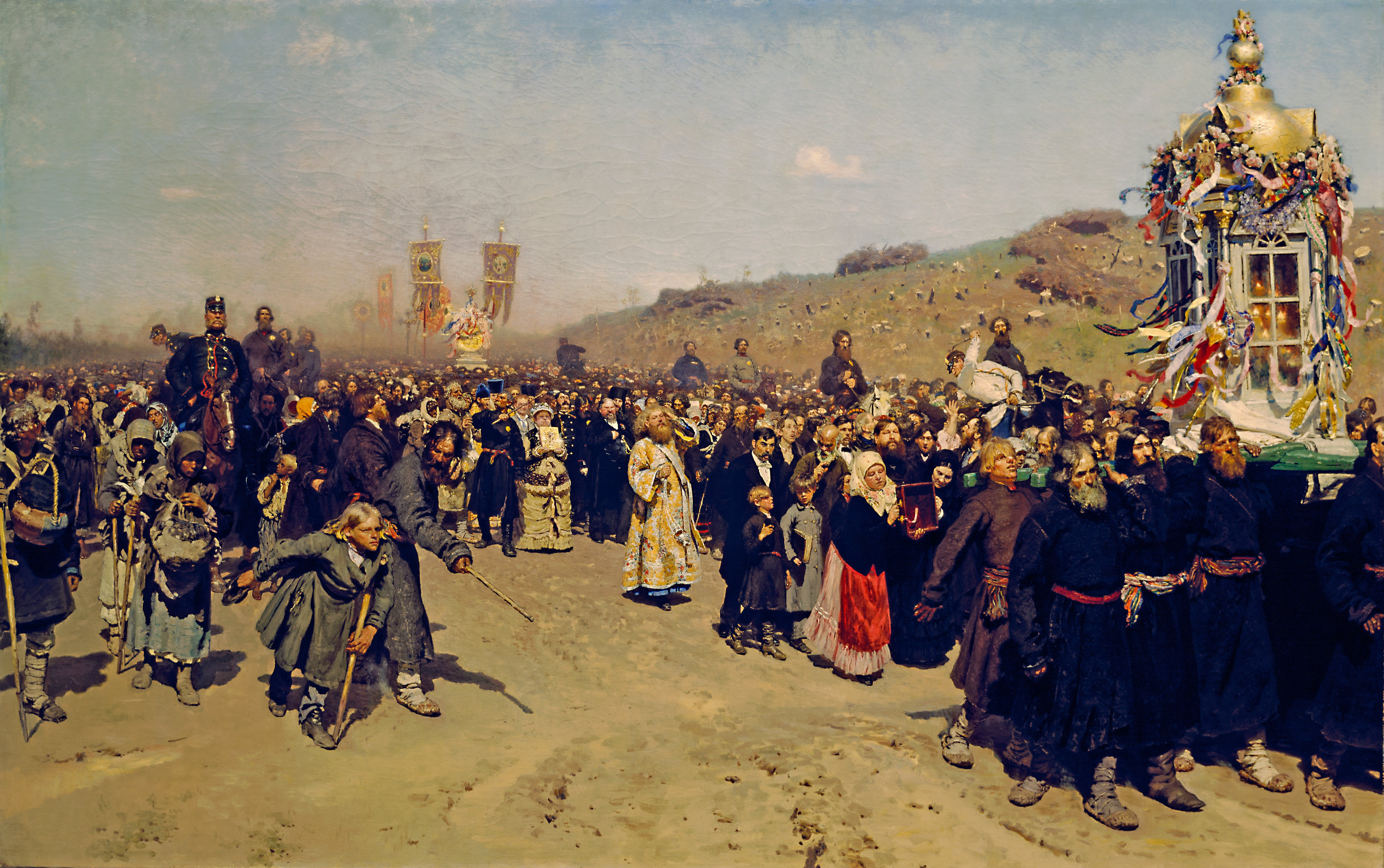
I. Е. Repin. Religious Procession in Kursk Governorate (1880–1883, State Tretyakov Gallery)

Art historian Dmitry Sarabianov noted that the painting Welcoming the Icon was an important step toward the interpretation of scenes of peasant life, including a multifaceted and versatile display of various representatives of the people — a "multifaceted gallery of peasant types". Savitsky's work "begins to dominate the psychological solution of the theme", because his intention is largely “revealed through the psychology of each participant in the scene". According to Sarabianov, in this work, Savitsky's “psychological solution of the theme begins to prevail", as his idea is largely “revealed through the psychology of each of the participants in the scene".

Art historian Sofia Goldstein wrote that the painting Welcoming the Icon fully revealed Savitsky's talent as a "painter of folk motifs" who was able to "come close to understanding the complex psychology of the people". Goldstein noted that, in comparison with earlier works of the artist, this work presents an "immeasurably wider and more diverse gallery of folk images". In her opinion, the painting Welcoming the Icon “unequivocally put Savitsky in the ranks of the advanced artists of the era".

== Bibliography ==
- Benois, A. N. (1995). История русской живописи в XIX веке [History of Russian painting in the XIX century] (in Russian). М.: Республика. p. 448. ISBN 5-250-02524-2
- Goldstein, S. N. (1965). Развитие бытового жанра в 1870—1880-е годы // История русского искусства / И. Э. Грабарь, В. С. Кеменов, В. Н. Лазарев [Development of the genre painting in the 1870s-1880s] (in Russian). Vol. 9, book 1. М.: Наука. pp. 300–361.
- Gorina T. N., Prytkova V. A. (1964). Крестьянская тема в жанровой живописи передвижников — В. М. Максимова, И. М. Прянишникова, Г. Г. Мясоедова, К. А. Савицкого // Русская жанровая живопись XIX — начала XX века / Т. Н. Горина [Peasant theme in the genre painting of the Peredvizhniki - V. M. Maximov, I. M. Pryanishnikov, G. G. Myasoedov, K. A. Savitsky] (in Russian). М.: Искусство. pp. 167–206.
- Zonova, Z. T. (1958). История создания картины К. А. Савицкого "Ремонтные работы на железной дороге" // Государственная Третьяковская галерея. Материалы и исследования [History of the creation of the painting by K. Savitsky “Repair work on the railroad”] (in Russian). Vol. 2. М.: Советский художник. pp. 115–124.
- Zonova, Z. T. (1962). Константин Аполлонович Савицкий // Русское искусство: очерки о жизни и творчестве художников. Вторая половина XIX века, часть I / А. И. Леонов [Konstantin Apollonovich Savitsky // Russian Art: Essays on the life and work of artists. The second half of the XIX century, part I] (in Russian). М.: Искусство. pp. 315–336.
- Kuzakov, S. V. (1998). Цветковская галерея и её основатель // Москва. Люди, проблемы, события. Краеведческий сборник / И. А. Гузеева, Н. М. Пашаева [Tsvetkov Gallery and its founder // Moscow. People, problems, events. Local lore collection / I. A. Guzeeva, N. M. Pashayeva] (in Russian). М.: ГПИБ. pp. 91–117. ISBN 978-5852090454.
- Levenfish, E. G. (1959). Константин Аполлонович Савицкий [Konstantin Apollonovich Savitsky] (in Russian) (Л.—М. ed.). Искусство. p. 176.
- Metyolkina, A. G. (2008). Савицкий Константин Аполлонович // Русские живописцы XVIII—XIX века. Биографический словарь / Е. Ф. Петинова [Savitsky Konstantin Apollonovich // Russian painters of the XVIII-XIX centuries. Biographical Dictionary / E. F. Petinova] (in Russian). СПб.: Азбука-Классика. pp. 532–535. ISBN 978-5-91181-923-1.
- Mudroguel, N. A. (1962). Пятьдесят восемь лет в Третьяковской галерее. Воспоминания [Fifty-eight years in the Tretyakov Gallery. Memories.] (in Russian). Л.: Художник РСФСР. p. 206.
- Roginskaya, F. S. (1989). Товарищество передвижных художественных выставок [The Travelling Art Exhibitions Society] (in Russian). М.: Искусство. p. 430.
- Sarabyanov, D. V. (1955). Народно-освободительные идеи русской живописи второй половины XIX века [People's liberation ideas of Russian painting of the second half of the XIX century] (in Russian). М.: Искусство. p. 300.
- Sokolnikov, M. P. (1947). Савицкий [Savitsky]. Массовая библиотека «Искусство» (in Russian). М.: Искусство. p. 48.
- Stasov, V. V. (1952). Избранные сочинения: живопись, скульптура, музыка [Selected Works: Painting, Sculpture, Music] (in Russian). Vol. 2. М.: Искусство.
- Stasov, V. V. (1968). Передвижная выставка 1878 года // Избранные статьи о русской живописи [The Travelling Art Exhibition of 1878 // Selected articles on Russian painting] (in Russian). М.: Детская литература. pp. 124–151.
- Tolstoy, L. N. (1984). В. В. Стасову // Собрание сочинений в 22 томах [To V. V. Stasov // Collected Works in 22 Volumes] (in Russian). Vol. 18. М.: Художественная литература. pp. 833–834.
- Fyodorov-Davydov, А. А. (1954). Искусство второй половины XIX века // Очерки по истории русского искусства / Н. Г. Машковцев [Art of the second half of the XIX century // Essays on the history of Russian art / N. G. Mashkovtsev] (in Russian). М.: Издательство Академии художеств СССР. pp. 161–299.
- Fyodorov-Davydov, А. А. (1989). Илья Ефимович Репин [Ilya Yefimovich Repin] (in Russian). М.: Искусство. p. 121. ISBN 5-98724-030-1
- Fiala, V. (1974). Русская живопись в собраниях Чехословакии [Russian painting in the collections of Czechoslovakia] (in Russian). Л.: Художник РСФСР. p. 152.
- Chistyakov, P. P. (1953). Письма, записки, воспоминания / Э. М. Белютин, Н. М. Молева [Letters, notes, memoirs] (in Russian). М.: Искусство.
- Государственная Третьяковская галерея — каталог собрания / Я. В. Брук, Л. И. Иовлева [State Tretyakov Gallery - catalog of the collection] (in Russian). Vol. 4: Живопись второй половины XIX века, book 2, Н—Я. М.: Красная площадь. 2006. p. 560. ISBN 5-900743-22-5
- Государственный Русский музей — каталог собрания / В. А. Леняшин [State Russian Museum - catalog of the collection] (in Russian). Vol. 7: Живопись второй половины XIX века (Н—Я). СПб.: Palace Editions. 2017. p. 248. ISBN 978-3-906917-17-7.
- Константин Аполлонович Савицкий. Выставка произведений — каталог / С. Н. Гольдштейн, С. А. Гржебина [Konstantin Apollonovich Savitsky. Exhibition of works - catalog] (in Russian). М.: Советский художник. 1955. p. 122.
- Переписка И. Н. Крамского: И. Н. Крамской и П. М. Третьяков, 1869—1887 / С. Н. Гольдштейн [Correspondence of I. N. Kramskoi: I. N. Kramskoi and P. M. Tretyakov, 1869-1887] (in Russian). М.: Искусство. 1953. p. 458.
- Письма художников Павлу Михайловичу Третьякову: 1870—1879 / Н. Г. Галкина, М. Н. Григорьева, Н. Л. Приймак [Letters from artists to Pavel Mikhailovich Tretyakov: 1870-1879] (in Russian). М.: Искусство. 1968. p. 558.
- Товарищество передвижных художественных выставок. Письма, документы. 1869—1899 / В. В. Андреева, М. В. Астафьева, С. Н. Гольдштейн, Н. Л. Приймак [The Society of Travelling Art Exhibitions. Letters, documents. 1869-1899] (in Russian). М.: Искусство. 1987. p. 668.
