= Rogvold Sukhoverko =

Russian actor

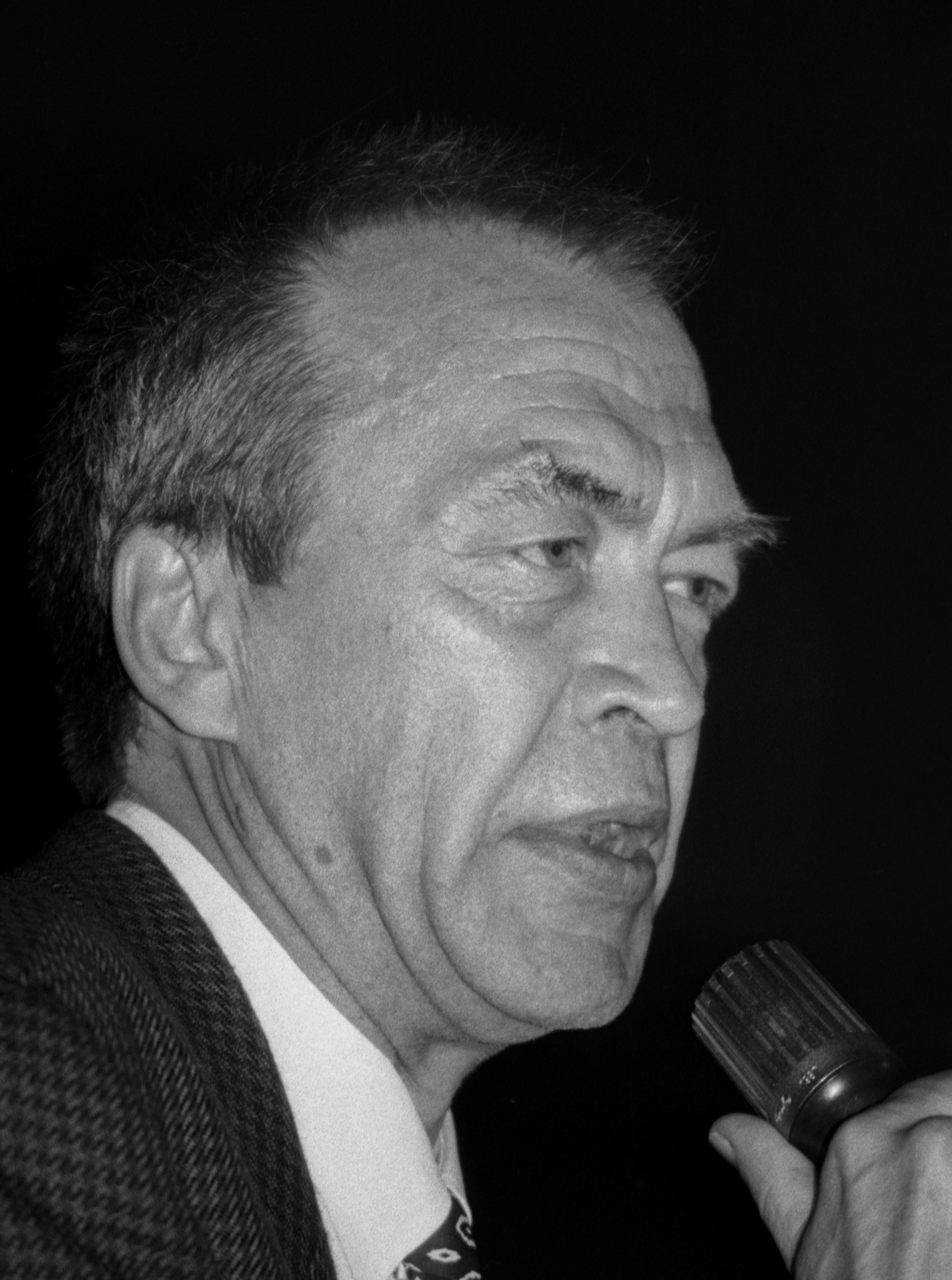
- Rogvold Sukhoverko in 1993
- Born: Rogvold Vasilyevich Sukhoverko; 30 October 1941; Leningrad, Russian SFSR, USSR
- Died: 9 April 2015 (aged 73); Moscow, Russia
- Occupation: Actor
- Years active: 1965–2015
- Awards: Meritorious Artist (2002)

Rogvold Vasilyevich Sukhoverko (Russian: Рогволд Васильевич Суховерко; 30 October 1941 – 9 April 2015) was a Soviet and Russian film and voice actor.

== Biography ==
Rogvold Sukhoverko was born in Leningrad (now St. Petersburg) on 30 October 1941, to Vasiliy Vasilevich Suhoverko, a military doctor, and Aleksandra Yakovlevna (née Terenteva) Suhoverko.

In 1965, Sukhoverko graduated from the Moscow Art Theatre school (class of Vasily Markov). In the same year he joined the troupe of the Sovremennik Theatre, where he worked for many years. He also worked in radio, and as a dubbing actor. He had voice-acted in numerous domestic and foreign animated cartoons, feature films, and, as well, in computer games. In 2008, the publishing house Zebra E released Rogvold Sukhoverko's book of memories, Zigzagi, which is about the Sovremennik Theatre, and his radio and stage activities.

Sukhoverko possessed a basso profondo, but almost lost his voice due to illness. From 2005 on, he did not take the voice acting anymore. His last theatrical appearance was made on 4 April 2015. On 9 April 2015, he died in Moscow after a long struggle with his illness, despite which he continued to play at the theatre. A farewell ceremony of Rogvold Sukhoverko was held on 11 April 2015 at the main stage of the Sovremennik Theatre.

== Personal life ==
He has a son, Anton Sukhoverko (born 1969), who is an economist, and also known for his child role as Kolya Sulima in the TV miniseries Guest from the Future, and a daughter, Aleksandra Sukhoverko (born 1973).

== Filmography ==
=== As actor ===
==== Theatre ====
Year	Title	Role	Venue	Refs
1965	Eternally Alive by Viktor Rozov	Zaitsev	Sovremennik Theatre	
1965	The Naked King by Evgeny Shvarts	General	Sovremennik Theatre	
1965	Snow White and the Seven Dwarfs by Oleg Tabakov, Lev Ustinov	Tuesday, Guard	Sovremennik Theatre	
1965	Without a Cross! by Vladimir Tendryakov	Father Dmitry	Sovremennik Theatre	
1965	Always For Sale by Vasily Aksyonov	Employee	Sovremennik Theatre	
1966	A Common Story by Viktor Rozov (based on Goncharov's novel)	Surkov	Sovremennik Theatre	
1966	Nocna opowieść by Krzysztof Choiński	Skinny	Sovremennik Theatre	
1967	Traditional Gathering by Viktor Rozov	Rodionov	Sovremennik Theatre	
1967	The Ballad of the Sad Café by Edward Albee	First Rainey	Sovremennik Theatre	
1967	The Decembrists by Leonid Zorin	Yakubovich	Sovremennik Theatre	
1967	Narodovoltsy by Aleksandr Svobodin	Morozov	Sovremennik Theatre	
1967	The Bolsheviks by Mikhail Shatrov	Stuchka	Sovremennik Theatre	
1968	The Lower Depths by Maxim Gorky	Krivoy Zob	Sovremennik Theatre	
1968	Masters by Racho Stoyanov	Slavcho	Sovremennik Theatre	
1969	The Princess and the Wood-Cutter by G. Volchek and M. Mikaelyan	Magiash	Sovremennik Theatre	
1969	Apetyt na czereśnie by Agnieszka Osiecka	Man	Sovremennik Theatre	
1970	The Seagull by Anton Chekhov	Trigorin	Sovremennik Theatre	
1971	The Toth, Others and the Major by István Örkény	Cesspool cleaner	Sovremennik Theatre	
1972	Don't Part with Your Beloved by Aleksandr Volodin	Konikov	Sovremennik Theatre	
1973	Balalaikin and Co by S. Mikhalkov (based on Saltykov-Shchedrin's Contemporary Idyll)	Molodkin	Sovremennik Theatre	
1973	Weather for Tomorrow by Mikhail Shatrov	Broadcaster employee	Sovremennik Theatre	
1974	From Lopatin's Notes by Konstantin Simonov	Huber	Sovremennik Theatre	
1975	Twelfth Night by William Shakespeare	Antonio	Sovremennik Theatre	
1976	The Cherry Orchard by Anton Chekhov	Station Master	Sovremennik Theatre	
1977	And in the Morning They Woke Up by Vasily Shukshin	Sibiryak	Sovremennik Theatre	
1977	Feedback by Alexander Gelman	Rachadov	Sovremennik Theatre	
1980	More than Pearls and Gold by G. Sokolova (based on Hans Christian Andersen's play)	Spirit King	Sovremennik Theatre	
1981	Search-891 by Yulian Semyonov	Deputy Regger	Sovremennik Theatre	
1981	The Cabal of Hypocrites by Mikhail Bulgakov	Brother Strength	Sovremennik Theatre	
1982	Three Sisters by Anton Chekhov	Ferapont	Sovremennik Theatre	
1983	The Government Inspector by Nikolai Gogol	Gendarme	Sovremennik Theatre	
1988	The Scaffold by Chinghiz Aitmatov	Priest	Sovremennik Theatre	
1989	Flat Cat, Midiocre Fuzziness by V. Voinovich and G. Gorin	Writers' Union's Secretariat Member	Sovremennik Theatre	
1991	Anfisa by Leonid Andreyev	Pavel Anosov	Sovremennik Theatre	
1995	The Merry Wives of Windsor by William Shakespeare	Robert Shallow	Sovremennik Theatre	
1997	The Cherry Orchard by Anton Chekhov	Firs	Sovremennik Theatre	
1999	Three Comrades by Erich Maria Remarque	Dr. Jaffe	Sovremennik Theatre	
2000	Let's Рlay... Shiller! (based on Friedrich Schiller's Mary Stuart)	Talbot	Sovremennik Theatre	
2004	Demons by Fyodor Dostoyevsky	Tikhon	Sovremennik Theatre	
2007	Woe from Wit by Alexander Griboyedov	Count Tugoukhovsky	Sovremennik Theatre	
2010	The Pretty One by Sergei Naidyonov	Officer	Sovremennik Theatre	
2011	The Time of Women by Elena Chizhova	Solomon Zakharovich	Sovremennik Theatre	
2011	Gorbunov and Gorchakov by Joseph Brodsky	Baranov	Sovremennik Theatre	

==== Film ====
Year	Title	Role	Notes
1968	They Live Nearby	Lotoshnikov	
1968	The Sixth of July	Congress delegate	
1969	The Red Tent	A bit part	
1970	Shine, Shine, My Star	Bandit	
1971	Property of the Republic	Commissioner Kochet	
1972	Land, on Demand	Lufthansa's aviator	
1975	Option'Omega'	German Soldier	Uncredited
1975	In the Land of Traps	policeman Samson Silych	Stop motion film
1975	Hello, I'm Your Aunt!	Constable	TV two-part film
1975	Port	Savitsky	
1975	Investigation Led by Experts 10: Counter Attack	Visitor	TV three-part film
1975	Hello, I'm Your Aunt!	constable	
1976	Days of Surgeon Mishkin	Krasnov	TV three-part film
1979	Profitable Contract	Stanislav Yudin	TV four-part film
1981	This Fantasy World	Extraterrestrial resident Probius	TV spectacle, issue 5
1984	Resident Return	recruiter from the hotel Cyclops	episode
2002	Shepherd of His Cows	Kolka's father	
2004	Death of Tairov	Konstantin Stanislavski	
2004	Goddess: How I fell in Love	Aksakov	

=== As voice actor ===
==== Film ====
Year	Title	Role	Notes
1982	Tron	Master Control Program	Russian dubbing
1987	Mr. India	Mogambo	Russian dubbing
1989	That Man from Rio	De Castro	Russian dubbing
1990	Morskoy volk	Johannsen	TV four-part film
1991	Tsar Ivan Groznyy	Philip II, Metropolitan of Moscow	
1994	Police Academy: Mission to Moscow	Cmdt. Eric Lassard	Russian dubbing
1998	I Still Know What You Did Last Summer	Estes	Russian dubbing
1999	Wild Wild West	General "Bloodbath" McGrath	Russian dubbing
2001	Scary Movie 2	Hugh Kane, Ghost	Russian dubbing
2001	Rat Race	Mechanic, several minor characters	Russian dubbing
2001	The Lord of the Rings: The Fellowship of the Ring	Gandalf	Russian dubbing
2001	Harry Potter and the Philosopher's Stone	Rubeus Hagrid	Russian dubbing
2002	The Lord of the Rings: The Two Towers	Gandalf	Russian dubbing
2002	Harry Potter and the Chamber of Secrets	Rubeus Hagrid	Russian dubbing
2003	The Lord of the Rings: The Return of the King	Gandalf the White	Russian dubbing
2003	The Texas Chainsaw Massacre	Sheriff Winston Hoyt	Russian dubbing
2003	Bruce Almighty	Jack Baylor	Russian dubbing
2003	The Matrix Revolutions	Trainman, Deus Ex Machina	Russian dubbing
2004	Harry Potter and the Prisoner of Azkaban	Rubeus Hagrid	Russian dubbing
2004	Troy	Priam	Russian dubbing
2004	The Accidental Spy	Faulty tractor's truckman	Russian dubbing
2004	Lesnaya tsarevna	The first counter, Antipas	
2005	Sin City	Manute	Russian dubbing

==== Animated cartoon ====
Year	Title	Role	Notes
1973	Buryonka from Maslenkino	Wolf	Stop motion short film
1974	It's Your Own Fault	Bear	Short film
1974	Alyonushka and the soldier	Zmey Gorynych's green head	Live-action puppet short
1974	The Adventures of Munchausen. Wonderful Island	Pirate captain	Short film
1974	The Wizard of Oz	Lion (separate series), Guard, Saber-toothed tiger	TV stop motion 10-part film
1975	In the Land of Traps	Gray Gelding	Stop motion film
1977	Two Maples	Bear	Stop motion short film
1977	Patchwork and the Cloud	King Fontanius	Stop motion short film
1977	Festival of Disobedience	Lion	Puppet feature film
1978	A Tale of Lost Time	policeman; old man on the bench	Stop motion short film
1979	The Flying Ship	Polkan	Short film
1980	Summer in Moominvalley	Wizard	Short film
1980	Topchumba	Father Bear	Stop motion short film
1980	Soldier's Tale	General	Short film
1980	Why Elephants?	Pelican	Short film
1981	Kot Kotofeevich	Bear	Short film
1981	He's Caught!	Bear	Short film
1981	Girlish Рatterns	Shooter Vlas, Tsar Stepan, Tsarevich Fedot, Baba Yaga (episode)	Stop motion short film
1981	Summer in Moominvalley	Wizard	Short film
1982	Lisa Patrikeevna	Bear	Short film
1983	Happy Merry-Go-Round No. 15. Girl and pirates	Three pirates	Short film
1983	Baby Elephant and Letter	Giraffe	Short film
1983	Boastful Little Mouse	Cloud	Stop motion short film
1984	And in This Fairy Tale it was Like This...	Frog	Stop motion short film
1984	Gift for an Elephant	Elephant	Short film
1984	Bluebird Calendar. Autumn	Bear	Stop motion short film
1985	Two Tickets to India	Professor Trankverri	Short film
1986	Happy Merry-Go-Round No. 18. Under the Tree	Wolf	Short film
1986	Miracles of Technology	Professor	Short film
1986	Valuable Рarcel	Father Bear	Stop motion short film
1987	Bogatyr рorridge	Second father	Short film
1988	Lion and 9 hyenas	A voice-over	Short film
1989	Pirate's Notes	House-dog	Short film
1989	Here There Be Tygers	Captain Forester, a voice-over	Short film
1991	On the Moonlit Road	Spider	Short film
1991	Vampires of Geon	KEK Commission Chairman	Short film
1991	Ivan Tsarevich and the Grey Wolf	Tsar-Father	Short film
1992	Captain Pronin: Grandson of Major Pronin	Ostap Tarasych	Short film
1992	Mashenka	Male characters	Stop motion short film
1992	Hey, On the other Side!	Dog named Dragon	Short film
1992	Selfless Hare	Wolf	Stop motion short film
1993	Vanyusha and the Giant	Giant	Stop motion short film
1993	Captain Pronin 3: Captain Pronin in Space	Commander; Examination Committee Chairman; Red Space Pirate	Short film
1993	A Few Рages from the Life of a Ghost	The Canterville Ghost	Stop motion short film
1994	Sharman, sharman! 2	Crocodile	Stop motion short film
1994	Boyaka Wouldn't Hurt a Fly 3. Be Healthy, Boyaka!	Lion	Stop motion short film
1995	Sharman, sharman! 3	Crocodile	Stop motion short film
1995	Puss in Boots	Herr Kарut (man-eater); King	Stop motion short film
1995	Boyaka Wouldn't Hurt a Fly 5	Lion	Stop motion short film
1995	Boyaka Wouldn't Hurt a Fly 6	Lion	Stop motion short film
1998	Everyone Got Caught...	Bear	Short film
2003	Fungus	Bear	Stop motion short film

===== Television series =====
Year	Title	Role	Notes
1991	Chip 'n Dale Rescue Rangers	Nemo	Russian dubbing
1991; 1992	DuckTales	Flintheart Glomgold, Black Pete, Lessdred, Headless Horseman, Captain Bounty, Ponce de Loon, King Blowhard, Yorick, Druid priest, Professor Moody Doody, El Capitan, General Chiquita, Bouncer Beagle, Bigtime Beagle (1992), Joaquin Slowly	Russian dubbing
1993	The New Adventures of Winnie the Pooh	Eeyore	Russian dubbing
1995	The Little Mermaid	Evil Manta	Russian dubbing
1995	Bonkers	Chief Leonard Kanifky, Wild Man Wyatt	Russian dubbing
199?	Superbook (2nd season)	The narrator, Superbook's voice, episodic characters (Christian Broadcasting Company's dubbing)	Russian dubbing

==== Video game ====
Year	Title	Voice	Notes
2000	Sea Dogs	Gunner on Highrock, different characters	Akella, original release
2000	Submarine Titans		1C Company/Snowball Studios, Russian localization
2000	Command & Conquer: Red Alert 2	All the male characters in the Soviet campaign	Fargus, Russian unofficial localization
2001	Rune	Odin	Buka Entertainment, Russian localization
2001	Soul Reaver 2	Kain, Elder God	Fargus, Russian unofficial localization
2001	Return to Castle Wolfenstein	OSA Director, Wilhelm Strasse, Heinrich I, some Reich soldiers	Fargus, Russian unofficial localization
2002	Stronghold	Lord Woolsack, Peasants	1C Company, Russian localization
2002	Medal of Honor: Allied Assault		Fargus, Russian unofficial localization
2002	Warcraft III: Reign of Chaos	Malfurion Stormrage, Antonidas, Orc Shaman, Orc Warlord, Mannoroth	1C SoftClub, Russian localization
2002	The Elder Scrolls III: Morrowind	Socucius Ergalla, male Khajiits, male Orsimers, male Argonians	Akella, Russian localization
2002	American McGee's Alice	Jabberwock, Oracle's voice in the Oracle's Grove, Mayor Elder	1C SoftClub, Russian localization
2002	The Lord of the Rings: The Fellowship of the Ring	Gandalf	1C SoftClub, Russian localization
2003	Arx Fatalis	King Poxsellis	Nival, Russian localization
2003	Warcraft III: The Frozen Throne	Malfurion Stormrage, Antonidas, Anub'arak, Orc Shaman, Witch Doctor, Mannoroth	1C SoftClub, Russian localization
2003	Stronghold: Crusader	Peasants	1C Company, Russian localization
2003	The Hobbit	Gandalf, Smaug	1C SoftClub, Russian localization
2004	Lionheart: Legacy of the Crusader	Leonardo da Vinci	1C Company, Russian localization
2005	Pathologic	Executor, George Kain, Artemiy Burakh, a voice-over	Ice-Pick Lodge, original release

==== Radio ====
Year	Title	Original
	Farewell to the Russian Poetry (poetry XVIII - XX centuries)	«Proschanie s russkoy poeziey» (poeziya XVIII – XX vekov)
	Fragile Domestic Walls (N. A. Zabolotsky's poetry)	«Neprochnyie domashnie stenyi» (stihi N. A. Zabolotskogo)
	Loneliness (poetry of M. Yu. Lermontov, A. K. Tolstoy, M. Voloshin)	«Odinochestvo» (poeziya M. Yu. Lermontova, A. K. Tolstogo, M. Voloshina)
	Unrepentant Sin (G. Vyatkin, P. Vasiliev, V. Narbut)	«Greh neraskayannyiy» (G. Vyatkin, P. Vasilev, V. Narbut)
