= Lev Ovalov =

Soviet writer (1905–1997)

Lev Sergeyevich Ovalov (Russian: Лев Сергеевич Овалов) (August 29, 1905 – April 30, 1997), a pen name of Lev Shapovalov (Шаповалов) was a Soviet writer, author of detective stories about the Chekist counterintelligence officer Major Pronin.

== Biography ==
Writer's biography is full of controversies: in one versions he has a noble genealogy, in others he is of "proletarian descent". A most plausible hypothesis is that in the early Soviet times he had to conceal his unacceptable "non-proletarian" origins in various Soviet questionaries.

In 1941 the writer was arrested, most probably due to his novel Ловцы сомнений (Catchers of Doubts) in which Trotskyites were portrayed not as negative as it was prescribed by official Soviet policies, and spent 15 years in prisons, Gulag labor camps, and exile, His books were banned. He returned to Moscow only in 1956. The same year he was rehabilitated, his Communist Party membership restored, the ban on his books lifted.

In 1966 he was contacted by his brother Dmitry, whose fate was unknown to Lev. It turned out that Dmitry was captured by the Germans in 1941, freed from a Nazi concentration camp by the Allies, but did not return to the Soviet Union and had eventually had become a citizen of Canada.

== Major Pronin ==
Major Pronin has become a character in Russian jokes, an ironic version of a James Bond-type super-Chekist, known better than the literary original: "A spy goes to the toilet. But Major Pronin's watchful eyes are looking out of the toilet bowl." A more elaborate narration: "... From the toilet bowl, Major Pronin’s intelligent, insightful, and slightly tired eyes looked at him."

=== Major Pronin stories ===
- 1939: «Синие мечи» ("Blue Swords" short story)
- 1939: «Зимние каникулы» ("Winter Vacations", short story)
- 1939: «Сказка о трусливом чёрте» ("A Fairy Tale about a Coward Devil" short story)
- 1940: «Куры Дуси Царёвой» ("Dusya Tsaryova's Hens" short story)
- 1940: «Agave mexicana» (short story)
- 1940: «Стакан воды» ("A Glass of Water", short story)
- 1941: «Голубой ангел» ("Blue Angel", novel)
- 1958: «Медная пуговица» ("Copper Button", novel)
- 1962: «Секретное оружие» ("Secret Weapon", novel)
- 2017 — «Тайны чёрной магии» ("Mysteries of Black Magic", novel, written in 1958, published posthumously)

== See also ==
- Captain Pronin, exploits of the grandson of Major Pronin
