= Bogdan Titomir =

Russian rapper and disc jockey (born 1967)

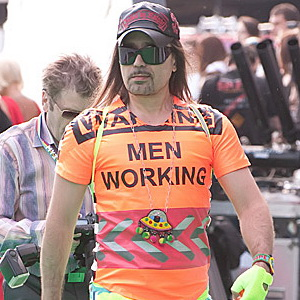
- Titomir in 2011

Background information
- Born: March 16, 1967 (age 59); Rostov-on-Don, Soviet Union
- Genres: hip-hop, rhythm and blues, techno, hip-house, pop, electropop
- Occupations: Rapper, disc jockey

Bogdan Titomir (born March 16, 1967) is a Russian rapper and disc jockey, who began his career in a popular 1990s duo Car-Man. Although Titomir's style derives from western stars such as MC Hammer and Vanilla Ice, as well as C&C Music Factory, he has established his own distinct style as a pop and rap performer as well as a DJ.

== Biography ==
=== Early years ===
Bogdan Titomir was born on March 16, 1967, in a family of engineers Pyotr Ivanovich Titomir and Lyudmila Pavlovna Titomir (maiden name Bondarenko). His grandparents on his father’s side lived in Odessa (his grandfather died in the war), and on his mother’s side in Rostov-on-Don. Many years later, at a family council, Bogdan’s mother told him that he was born to his grandmother near Rostov-on-Don. His mother studied to become an economist-programmer, and his father studied to become a civil engineer. After completing their education, the family went to Severodonetsk by assignment, subsequently changing their place of residence twice: first to Kyiv, and then to the city of Sumy.

In Sumy, his parents worked as engineers at the Frunze plant. The family lived in a five-story house in the courtyard of school No. 18, where Titomir studied. The boy began studying music at the age of five, for two years he studied piano at home with a tutor, a conservatory teacher, Nina Gennadievna Kruglova. In addition to secondary school, he attended two music schools. He graduated from a seven-year music school in piano with honors and a diploma with honors, at the same time he graduated from a five-year music school in classical guitar, where he was taken as an external student straight into the third grade thanks to classes with a tutor. According to Titomir’s class teacher, not a single school concert took place without his participation. In the seventh grade, he wrote a script for the KVN team "Karapuziki", became its captain and led it to victory. Soon, due to his father’s craving for alcohol, the parents divorced and separated when their son was in seventh grade. Bogdan stayed with his mother. In the eighth grade, due to an unpleasant incident, his parents transferred him to school No. 7, where he graduated from the ninth and tenth grades. At school, he was involved in swimming from the first grade, and by the Moscow Olympics he became a candidate for master of sports in swimming. He also studied judo at school, and by the time he graduated from the Institute of Culture he was a candidate for master of sports.

In the summer of 1984, after graduating from school, he entered the Kiev Institute of Culture, but, having changed his mind, took the documents and moved from Kyiv to Moscow, where he met familiar jazz musicians from Gnessin and became a student at the Gnessin School. After studying for less than a year, he entered the army in the spring of 1985. Served at the General Staff automobile base in Tushino. In two years he rose to the rank of sergeant major. In June 1987, immediately after the army, he entered the Moscow State Institute of Culture without exams at the faculty of directing cultural events and theatrical performances. In 1988, as part of a student exchange program, he visited New York, where he became acquainted with hip-hop. In 1994, after graduating from the Moscow State Institute of Cinematography with a bachelor's degree, he received the qualification of director of mass performances, as well as the rank of lieutenant.

=== Creativity ===
In 1989, Titomir began his career as a musician, making arrangements for the group Laskoviy Mai, then played drums for Dmitriy Malikov, and then worked as a backup dancer for singer Vladimir Maltsev. In October 1989, together with Sergey Lemokh, he created the exotic pop duo Car-Man, which became famous for the hits "Paris, Paris", "London, good-bye!" and "Chio-Chio-san". In the spring of 1991, after leaving the duo, Titomir began a solo career. Having signed a two-year contract with producer Sergei Lisovsky, he created the "High Energy" project and released two albums: "High Energy" (1992) and "High Energy II" (1993). The artist's calling card was the rap song "Do as I do" (1991), which at that time was perceived as "the anthem of a generation". In 1995 he released his third album, "The Greatest Love". In 1996, he left for the USA for three years.

In 1999, he took up DJing, performing in clubs under the pseudonym "DJ Bo". In 2006, he released the album "Freedom" with the title song "Life is So Short". In 2008, he became a co-host of the program "Striptease Star" on the MTV Russia channel. In 2010 he released the double album "Tender and Rough", and in 2011 the album "Very Important Pepper". In 2012, he became a presenter on the Peretz TV channel. In 2013, he took part in the television project "Island" on NTV. In 2020, he became the winner of the television project "Superstar! Return" (NTV). In 2021, he returned to music, releasing the album "RMX". In 2022, he published the album "55", dedicated to the artist’s 55th anniversary, and also released a space version of the album and a new release "Dan's'Bo". In addition, he starred in episodes in the films "Old Songs about the Main Thing-1" (1996), "The Newest Adventures of Pinocchio" (1997), "PiraMMMida" (2011) and "Zaitsev+1" (2012).

According to the readers of the Moskovskij Komsomolets newspaper, the Car-Man became the "Best Group of 1990", and their magnetic album "Around the World" was chosen as the "Best Phonogram of the Year". Titomir took second place in the list of "Best Singers of 1991" and third place in the list of "Best Singers of 1992". He is the author of the catchphrase "People eats" (1993). Mentioned in various media as "the first hip-hop artist", "the founder of Russian hip-hop", "the founder of domestic rap" and "the founder of rave culture in Russia". He is a laureate of the Night Life Awards "For his contribution to the club movement" (2001) and the "Movement-2005" award "For his contribution to the development of dance music" (2005). Repeated winner of the Silver Galosh award.

== Discography ==
- 1992 — Высокая энергия (High Energy)
- 1993 — Высокая энергия II
- 1995 — Самая большая любовь (X-Love)
- 1998 — Любимая пупса
- 2003 — БТР Project
- 2006 — Свобода
- 2010 — Нежный и грубый
- 2011 — Очень важный перец
- 2021 — RMX
- 2022 — 55
- 2022 — 55 Cosmic
- 2022 — Дэн'с'Бо
- 2022 — ФанкЛавер
- 2022 — 2 City

Mixtapes from DJ Bo

- 2004 — Indikator (3xCD): CD1 — Xclusive, CD2 — Energie, CD3 — Minimal
- 2005 — Hidroplan (3xCD): CD1 — Crystal, CD2 — Bubble Gum, CD3 — Orange Bud

As part of Car-Man

- 1990 — Вокруг света
