= Car-Man =

Russian band

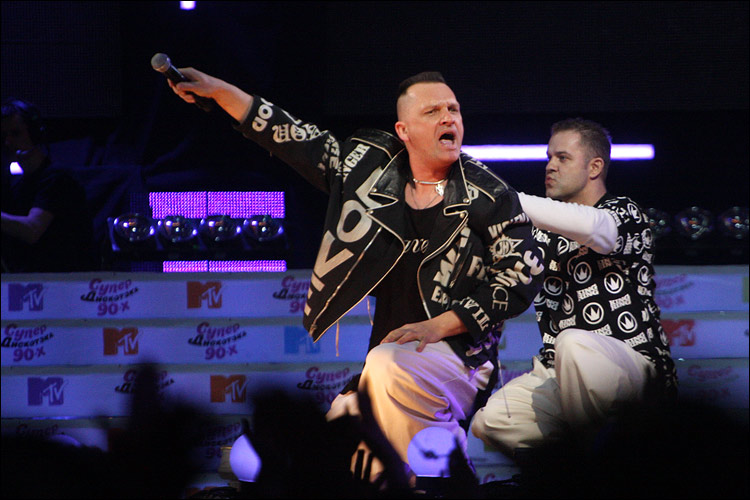
- Sergey Lemokh in 2010

Background information
- Origin: Moscow, Russia
- Genres: Electropop, techno, Euro disco, dubstep
- Years active: 1989–present
- Labels: Gala Records, ZeKo Records, JAM, etc.
- Members: Sergey Lemokh; Sergey Kolkov; Katrin Kanaeva
- Past members: Bogdan Titomir; Ruslan Tarkinskiy; Georgiy Marchenko; Mario Francisco Diaz
- Website: http://www.carmanmusic.ru

Car-Man (Russian: Кар-Мэн) is a Russian techno-pop band. It was one of the top Soviet/Russian bands in the early and mid nineties. Car-Man gained a massive following that ranged from music and dance to hair styles and speech. The band won a number of top prizes in 1991.

Car-Man was formed in 1989 by Sergey Lemokh and Bogdan Titomir. Their debut album called Vokrug sveta (English: Around the World) was very successful because of very exotic sound and style and for soviet pop scene. In 1991, the band had split, and as a result, Lemokh stayed with Car-Man, while Titomir started a solo project, debuting with the album Vysokaya Energya (English: High Energy).

Car-Man released 6 major albums, and a number of secondary albums of live and remixed music.

== Discography ==
Studio albums

Year	Transliterated title	Original title	Translation
1990	Vokrug sveta	Вокруг света	Around the World
1991	Carmania	Кармания	Carmania
1994	Russkaya massirovannaya zvukovaya agressiya	Русская массированная звуковая агрессия	Russian Massive Sound Aggression
1996	Tvoya seksual'naya shtuchka	Твоя сексуальная штучка	Your Sexy Thing
1998	Korol' disca	Король диска	King of Disco
2009	Nitro	Нитро	Nitro

Remix albums

Year	Transliterated title	Original title	Translation
1999	Nazad v buduschee	Назад в будущее	Back to Future
2014	Ultrazvuk	Ультразвук	Ultrasonic

Live albums

Year	Name
1994	Live...

Compilation albums

Year	Name
1999	The Best of...
2000	Legends of Russian Disco I
2001	Legends of Russian Disco II
2001	Star Collection
2009	Grand Collection
