= Sergey Lemokh =

Russian musician (born 1965)

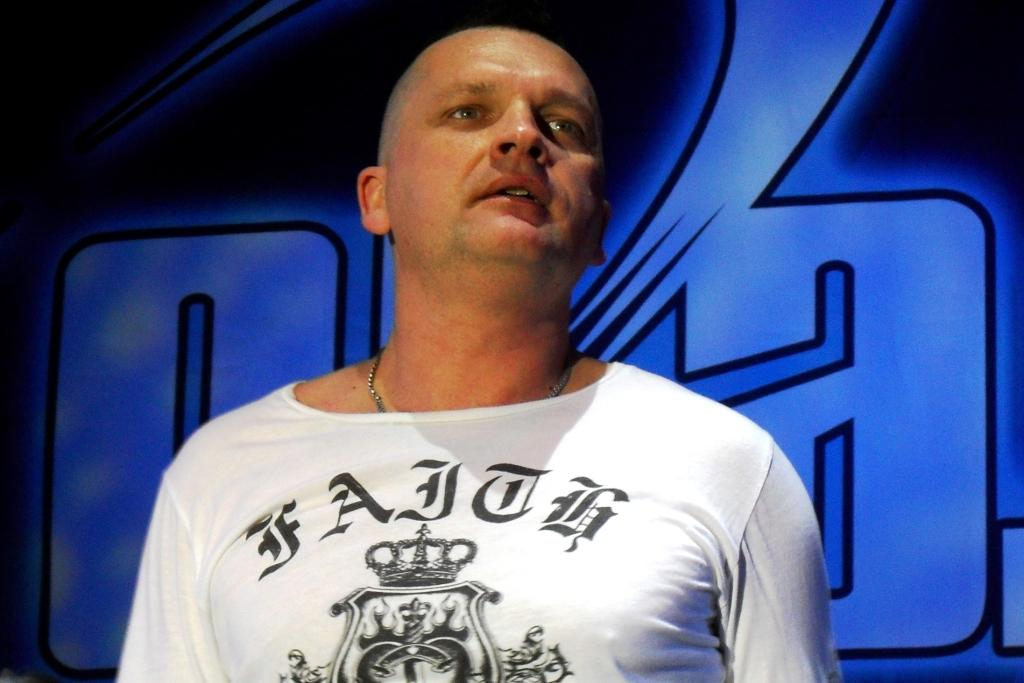
Lemokh in 2009

Sergey Lemokh (born as Sergey Ogurtsov) is a leader of a Soviet/Russian pop band Car-Man and rock band Carbonrock. Lemokh was born in city of Moscow, Soviet Union on May 14, 1965. He graduated from Moscow Cooperative Institute in 1988. In 1990 Lemokh co-founded Car-Man with Bogdan Titomir. After Titomir left in 1991, Lemokh continued as a solo leader of the band. Lemokh wrote and recorded 5 major and a number of secondary albums with Car-Man. In 1997 he released a solo instrumental album Polaris.

== Albums ==
- Nitro — 2009
- Back to Future — 1999
- The King of the Disk — 1998
- Your Sexy Thing — 1996
- Polaris — 1995
- Live... — 1994
- Massive Sonic Aggression of Russia — 1994
- Carmania — 1992
- Around the World — 1991

== Facts ==
Sergey changed his last name, Ogurtsov, to his mother's maiden name, Lemokh. He is often called Oguretz (Russian for "cucumber").

== See also ==
- Car-Man
- Bogdan Titomir
