= Morning in a Pine Forest =

1889 painting by Ivan Shishkin and Konstantin Savitsky

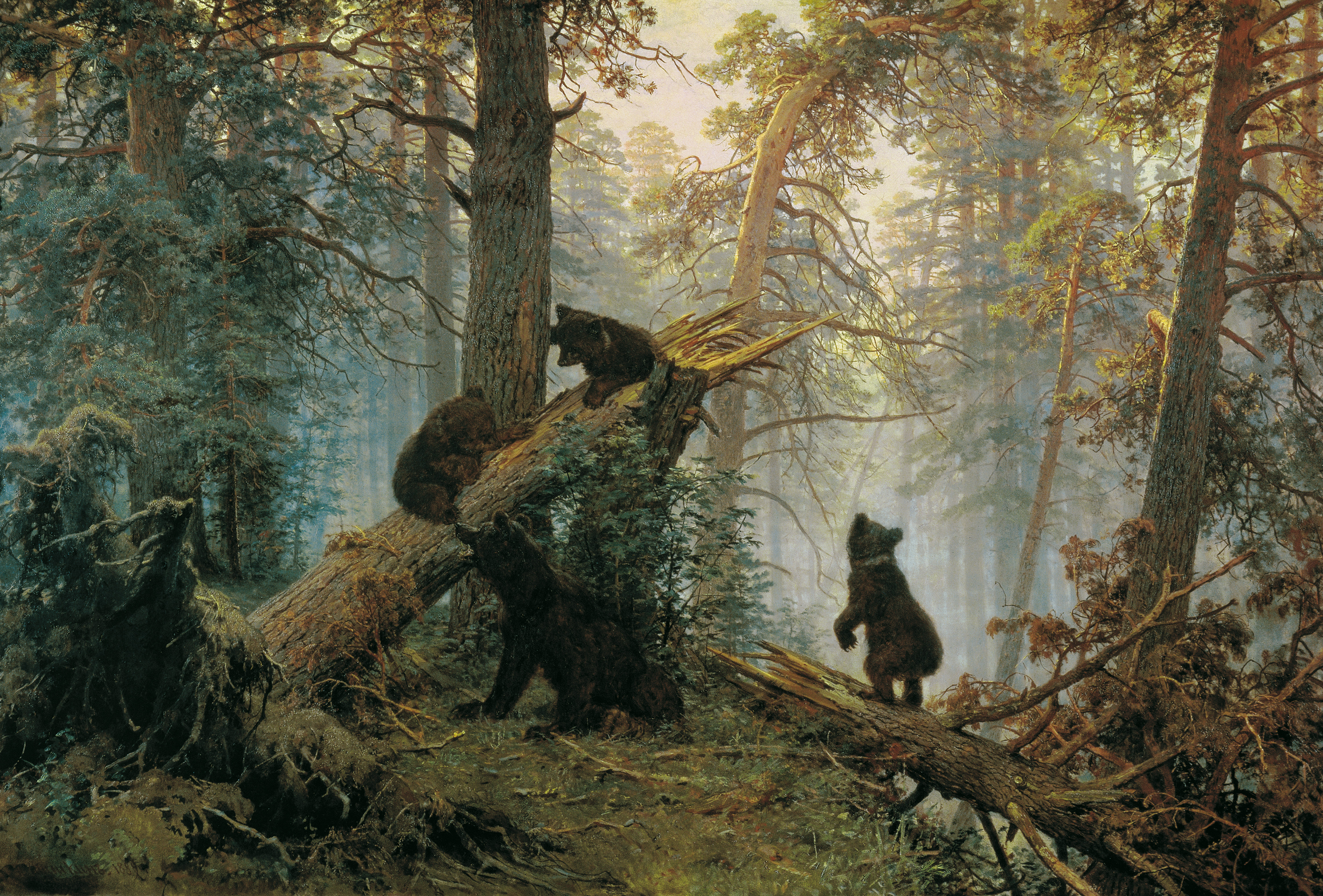
- Artist: Ivan Shishkin, Konstantin Savitsky
- Year: 1889
- Medium: Oil on canvas
- Dimensions: 139 cm × 213 cm (55 in × 84 in)
- Location: Tretyakov Gallery, Moscow

Morning in a Pine Forest (Russian: Утро в сосновом лесу), formerly The Bear Family in the Forest (Note: In the authors' lifetime, the painting was called that.) (Russian: Медвежье семейство в лесу), is a painting by Russian artists Ivan Shishkin and Konstantin Savitsky.

According to one poll, the painting is the second most popular in Russia behind Bogatyrs (1898) by Viktor Vasnetsov.

== Creation ==
Initially, the painting, which measures 139×213 cm, did not include bears. However, the artist Konstantin Savitsky, who knew Shishkin well, proposed to supplement the painting with figures of living creatures – bears. At the request of Shishkin, who had some doubts about his abilities as an animal painter, Savitsky depicted a family of wild animals playing carefree between the roots and trunks of fallen pine trees, making the painting more dynamic. Before Pavel Tretyakov bought the painting, it bore the signatures of two artists: I. I. Shishkin and K. A. Savitsky.

It is believed that Shishkin painted the pine trees near Vologda forests on Gorodomlya Island, which is located on Lake Seliger – a territory of untouched wilderness at the time.

== Authorship controversy ==
Shishkin suggested that Savitsky sign The Bear Family in the Forest, which he did. Soon after its completion, the painting was purchased by art collector Pavel Tretyakov. Tretyakov was upset to see Savitsky's signature on the work, and ordered the signature be removed with turpentine. Later, Savitsky came to the gallery and noticed his signature was gone. When he asked about it, Tretyakov explained the situation, stating that "from idea to performance, everything discloses the painting manner and creative method peculiar just to Shishkin." As the result, the painting is often credited solely to Shishkin.

== Mishka Kosolapy ==
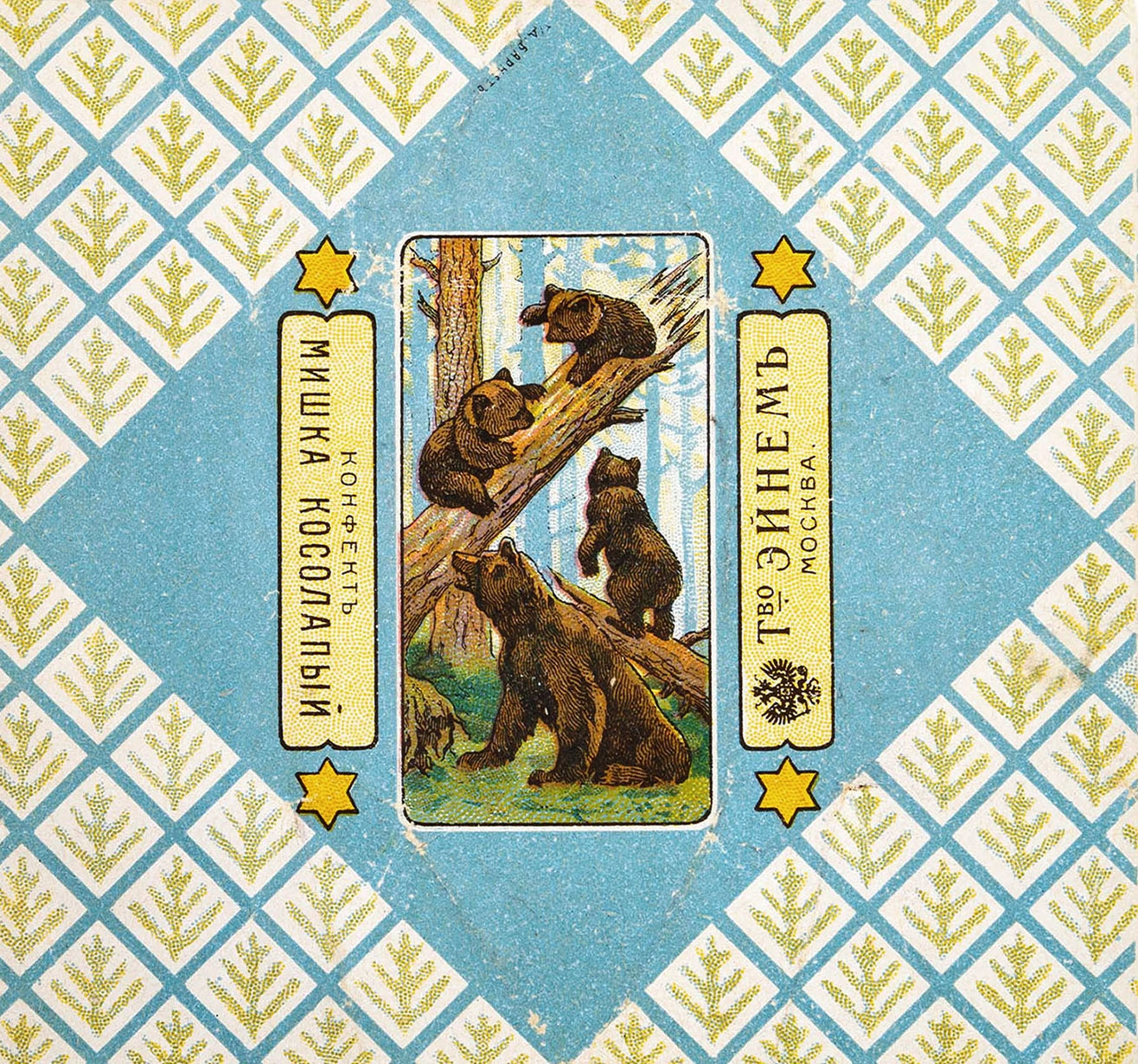
Mishka Kosolapy chocolate wrapper

In the late 1880s, the owner of a candy factory Ferdinand Theodor von Einem (after nationalization – "Red October" (Krasny Oktyabr)) decided to give one of the products a ceremonial appearance. They concluded an agreement with the owner of the painting Morning in a Pine Forest, thus getting an opportunity to make a copy of the masterpiece. The factory produced the first batch of candies "Clumsy Bear" ("Mishka Kosolapy") in the early 1890s. The candy received the highest mark of distinction at the All-Russian Industrial and Art Exhibition in Nizhny Novgorod (1896), and in 1900 Paris Exposition won the Grand Prix. The authorship of the design of the famous candy belongs to the artist Manuil Andreev, who in 1913 placed on the wrapper the subject of the painting "Morning in a Pine Forest" framed by green spruce branches and drew six-pointed stars of Bethlehem, because in those years candy was the most expensive and desirable gift for Christmas.

== Commentary ==
Walk away by a look into this grey fog of the forest distance, into The Bear Family in the Forest... and you will realise what a connoisseur of the forest, what a strong objective artist you are dealing with.

— Vasily Mikheyev, The Artist, 1894, March, No. 35, p. 132
