= Repair Work on the Railway =

Painting by Konstantin Savitsky

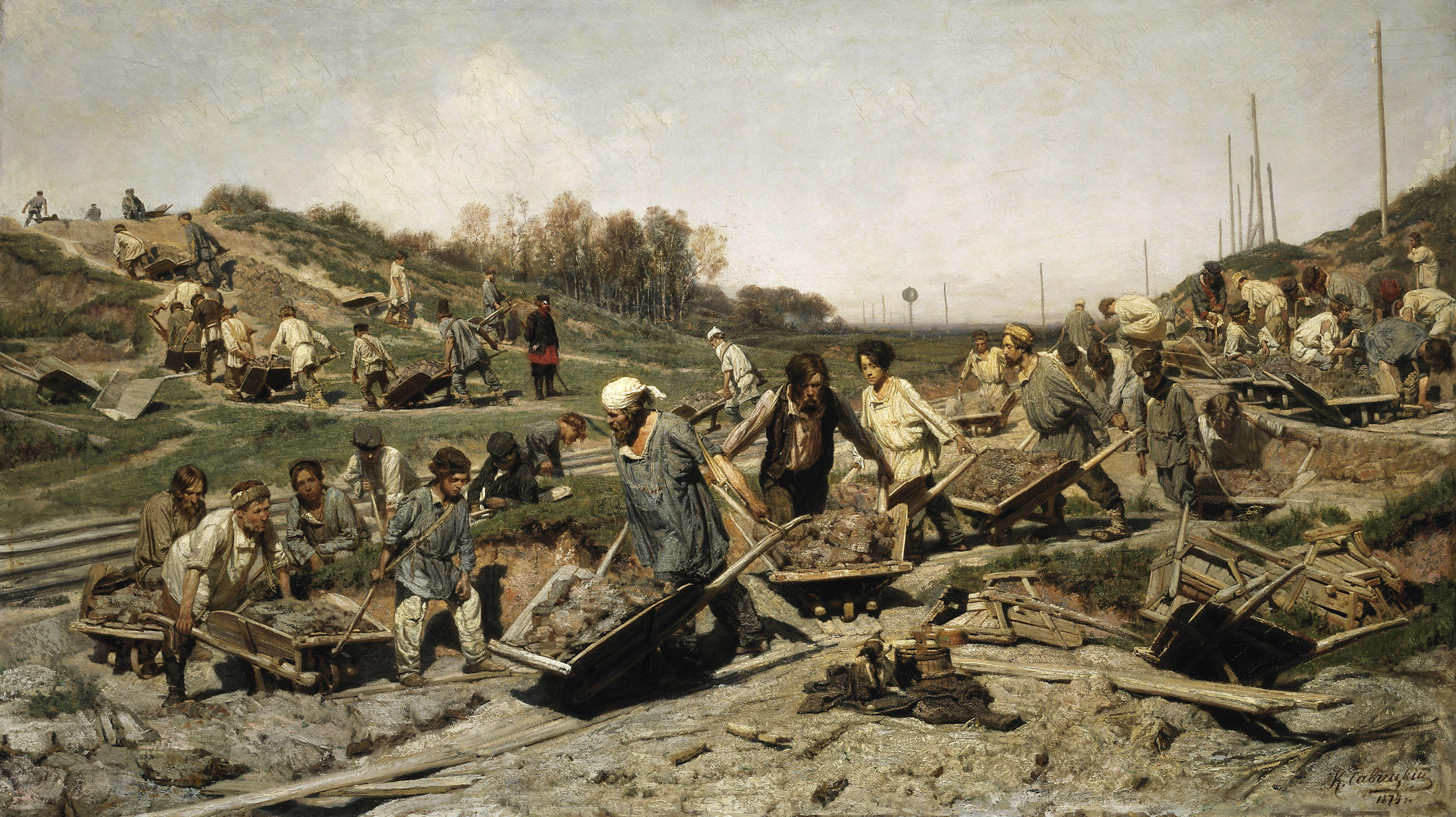
- Artist: Konstantin Savitsky
- Year: 1874
- Medium: Oil on canvas
- Dimensions: 103 cm × 180,8 cm (41 in × 712 in)
- Location: State Tretyakov Gallery, Moscow

Repair Work on the Railway is a painting by Russian artist Konstantin Savitsky (1844–1905), completed in 1874. It is held in the State Tretyakov Gallery in Moscow (Inventory 590). The dimensions of the painting are 103 × 180.8 cm (100 × 175 cm, according to other sources). The titles Railway Repair, Railway Workers and Repair on the Railway are also used.

The idea for the painting came to Savitsky in the summer of 1873, when he was observing the work of repairing the tracks of the Moscow-Kursk railway near the station of Kozlova Zaseka in the Tula Governorate, where he lived with the artists Ivan Shishkin and Ivan Kramskoi. Savitsky continued to work on the painting until the end of 1873, making the final revisions in January 1874.

The painting Repair Work on the Railway, was presented at the third exhibition of the Society for Travelling Art Exhibitions (Peredvizhniki), which opened in St Petersburg in January 1874 and subsequently relocated to Moscow in April of the same year. Savitsky's work was well received and subsequently purchased by Pavel Tretyakov. In 1878, the painting Repair Work on the Railway was included in the Russian exposition at the World's Fair held in Paris.

The artist and critic Alexandre Benois wrote that Savitsky became "an important pillar of the Peredvizhniki" with the creation of the painting Repair Work on the Railway in 1874, and noted that this canvas was "homogeneous in spirit and theme" with Ilya Repin's Burlaks on the Volga. According to art historian Sofia Goldstein, Savitsky's Repair Work constituted "the first significant work by the novice master, which brought him well-deserved recognition." In the opinion of art historian Dmitry Sarabianov, the works Burlaks on the Volga and Repair Work are "a significant milestone in the history of Russian art, in the development of the theme of the people in Russian painting."

== History ==
=== Background ===
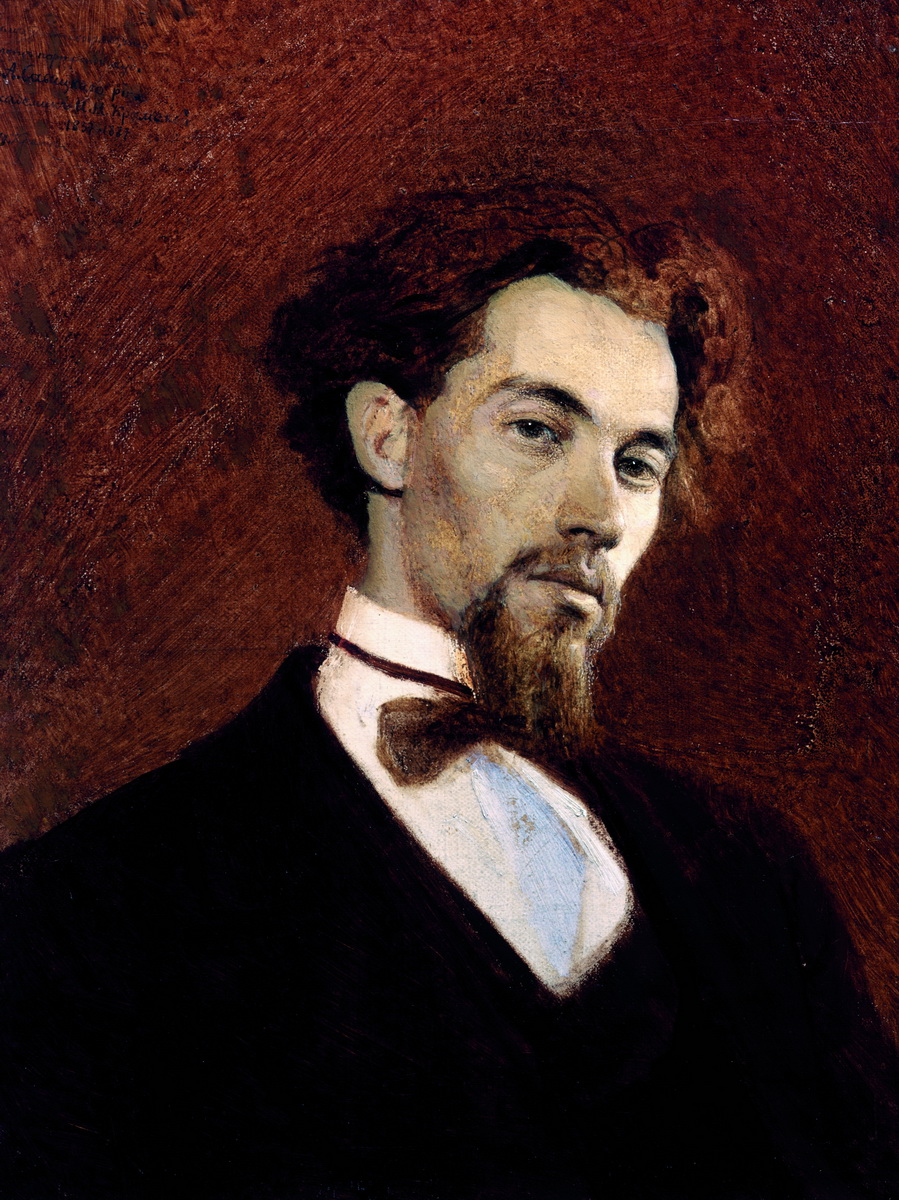
Ivan Kramskoi, Konstantin Savitsky, 1871, oils; Voronezh Art Museum

In 1862–1873 (with interruptions), Konstantin Savitsky studied at the Academy of Arts in the class of historical painting, where his mentors were Fyodor Bruni, Alexey Markov and Pavel Chistyakov. In the period between 1868 and 1870, Savitsky was awarded several small silver medals, including one for his work The Sharman Man and another for his sketch The Crucifixion of Christ. In the following period, between 1869 and 1870, he was awarded two big silver medals, one for a study and the other for a drawing. Finally, in 1871, he was awarded a small gold medal of the Academy of Arts for his program Cain and Abel. From 1871 onwards Savitsky was a stipend holder of Emperor Alexander II.

Concurrently, in the early 1870s, Savitsky began his rapprochement with the Peredvizhniki, members of the Society for Travelling Art Exhibitions, whose first exhibition opened at the Academy of Arts in January 1871. At the second exhibition of the Society for Travelling Art Exhibitions, which opened in December 1872, two paintings by Savitsky were exhibited: Children and Official, or Visit to the bosses (the current location of both canvases is unknown). The success of the travelling exhibitions caused irritation and concern within the Academy of Arts. In order to deter potential dissenters, at a meeting of the Academy Council on 26 January 1873, Konstantin Savitsky was expelled from the Academy. As a result, he was deprived of the right to compete for the first gold medal and also lost the opportunity for a pensioner's trip abroad. Savitsky himself commented on the event: "I was expelled suddenly, without being given the opportunity to justify myself, if I was guilty of anything, and several years of my work at the Academy were irrevocably lost to me."

=== Creation ===
The idea for the painting Repair Work on the Railway came to Savitsky in the summer of 1873, which he spent with the artists Ivan Shishkin and Ivan Kramskoi in the Tula Governorate. They lived near the Kozlovka Zaseka railway station (the name Kozlovka-Zaseka is used in a number of publications), where Savitsky observed the work of reinforcing the tracks. He spent entire days by the railway and worked on studies for the future painting. At the same time, in neighbouring Yasnaya Polyana, Ivan Kramskoi was working on a portrait of Leo Tolstoy.

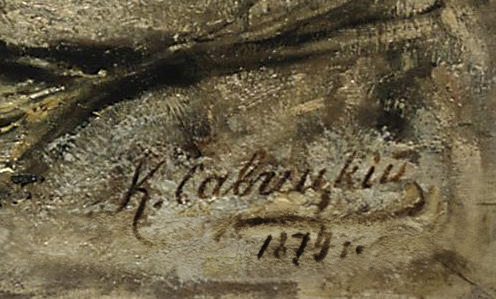
Savitsky's signature and date on the painting Repair Work on the Railway (the number '4' is written over the number '3')

At that time, Kozlova Zaseka (now Yasnaya Polyana station) constituted part of the Moscow-Kursk railway, constructed between 1864 and 1868 at the expense of the state treasury. In 1871, the railway was sold to a private company, namely a consortium of capitalists from Moscow, headed by industrialist Fyodor Chizhov. From 1873 onwards, the company that owned the railway carried out works to reinforce the embankment and enhance the track structure, with the objective of increasing the railway's capacity. In particular, the works comprised ballast replenishment and the replacement of light rails.

In a letter to the artist Ilya Repin dated 3 August 1873, Ivan Kramskoi wrote: "Savitsky begins to write 'Zemlekopy', found the plot here on the railway and ignited." Repin replied in a letter dated 2 September 1873, calling Savitsky by his patronymic: "I wish a brilliant ending to Apollonich, the idea is glorious." In a letter to the collector and patron of the arts Pavel Tretyakov, dated 11 August 1873, Kramskoi wrote: "Savitsky is working on a picture of 'Zemlekopy' on the railway, the sketch is good, what will come out – it is impossible to say."

Savitsky continued to work on the painting throughout the autumn and winter. In a letter dated 25 December 1873, addressed to Repin, who was in Paris at the time, Kramskoi reported that Savitsky "finished [his canvas] not bad, even good." Savitsky made the final revisions in January 1874, concurrently altering the date on the painting. The number ‘4’ in the year ‘1874’ is written over the number ‘3’.

=== After creation ===
The painting Repair Work on the Railway was exhibited at the 3rd exhibition of the Society for Travelling Art Exhibitions (Peredvizhniki), which opened in St Petersburg on 21 January 1874 and subsequently relocated to Moscow in April of the same year. Savitsky's work was included in the exhibition catalogue under the title 'Repair of the Railway'. The canvas made a good impression. According to Kramskoi, Savitsky "stood out very favourably." On 29 January 1874, Savitsky wrote to the artist Vasily Polenov, who was in Paris at the time: "I[,] your humble servant[,] also published my brainchild, I am not a judge myself. But in general I seem to like it, I will send or bring you a photograph... Against what you have seen, there have been many changes, most importantly in regard to lighting." Shortly before the opening of the exhibition, on 30 December 1873, Savitsky approached the board of the Peredvizhniki with a request to be accepted as a member of the Society. His request was granted at a meeting of the Society held after the opening of the exhibition, on 2 February 1874.

Ilya Repin tried to support Savitsky in every way he could. In a letter to the art critic Vladimir Stasov, dated 20 January 1874, commenting on the forthcoming showing of the painting Repair Work at the travelling exhibition, Repin wrote: "How happy I am for Savitsky! You cannot imagine! With all my heart I wish him to be a hero." In the same letter, Repin expressed his ironic stance on the Academy of Arts' unfair actions: "I also rejoice for the Academy. It is cursed, offended a man (Savitsky), and it itself seems to be in trouble." Repin perceived Savitsky's triumph as a public indictment of the Academy's decision to exclude Savitsky from its student body and deny him the chance to compete for the first gold medal. In a letter to Kramskoi, dated 17 February 1874, Repin wrote: "For Savitsky [I am] also terribly happy. Polenov saw his painting, not yet finished, and told me a lot, and I see that everything is true."

In letters to Nikolai Ge and Ivan Kramskoi, dated 3 March 1874, Pavel Tretyakov asked them to tell Savitsky that he was interested in buying the painting for his gallery. The patron of the arts wrote: "Having examined it once again, I decided to offer 1000 roubles for it, <...> for this price I will be very happy to buy it because in it, despite the dull general tone, there is a lot of great dignity." In a letter to Tretyakov, Savitsky thanked him and agreed to sell his painting on the condition that Tretyakov would not object to its display in other cities through which the route of the 3rd travelling exhibition passed. In correspondence with Tretyakov, Savitsky referred to his painting as 'Workers on the railway', a title that more accurately reflected the painting's content. Tretyakov accepted the artist's condition, and the painting was exhibited in Kharkiv, Odesa, Kyiv and Riga. With the money received from the sale of the painting, Savitsky was able to organise his trip to France.

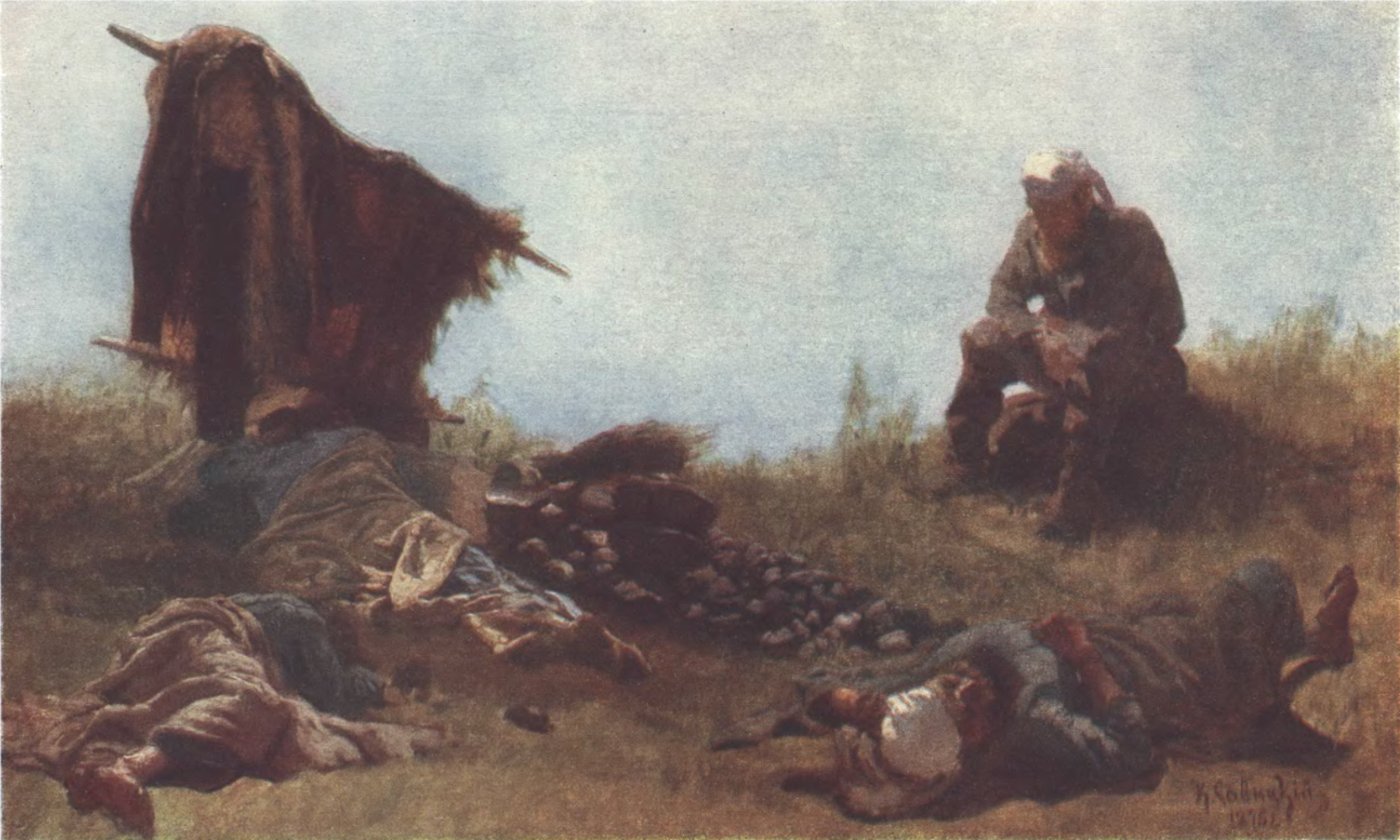
К.A. Savitsky. Rest at Work (1875, private collection)

Savitsky's work Rest at Work (canvas, oil, 33 × 53.2 cm, formerly in the collection of G.P. Belyakov, then in the collection of N.S. Arzhanikov, Moscow) from 1875 belongs to the same theme as Repair Work. This painting is also known as Digger's Rest. The canvas Rest at Work depicts an episode in the life of repair workers and is "kind of a completion of the painting 'Repair Work on the Railway'". On occasion, Rest at Work is considered to be one of the variant sketches for Savitsky's painting Harvesting Hay (1875), the whereabouts of which are unknown.

A number of canvases from Pavel Tretyakov's collection, including the painting Repair Work on the Railway, were proposed for display at the 1878 World's Fair, which was to be held in Paris. In order for Savitsky's painting to be included in the Russian section, it was necessary for it to prevail against the opposition of Andrey Somov, the chairman of the selection committee. In particular, Savitsky's supporters had to respond to criticism that had appeared in the press, including from the journalist and publisher Aleksey Suvorin. Ilya Repin wrote to Kramskoi about one of these reviews: "I regret that he [Savitsky] was so humiliated by the Stranger [Suvorin], saying that it [the painting] resembles 'burlaks'. Polenov says that it is absolute nonsense; and the main thing that I am annoyed about is that this is a great nuisance to Savitsky; they always do this – very fond of putting down, so that a young man does not become conceited." In spite of these obstacles, the painting Repair Work was sent to the exhibition in Paris, where it was well received by the critics. In particular, the author of the article in the collection Les chefs-d'oeuvre d'art à l'exposition universelle ("Masterpieces of Art at the Universal Exhibition") among the exhibits presented in the Russian exposition placed particular emphasis on Kuindzhi's Ukrainian Night, Repin's Burlaks on the Volga and Savitsky's Repair Works. In the catalogue of the Paris exhibition, Savitsky's canvas was listed under the French title Travaux de terrassement sur une ligne de chemin de fer (C. A. Savitzki).

Subsequently, the painting Repair Work on the Railway was exhibited at a number of exhibitions, including the 1923, 1955 and 1971–1972 exhibitions held at the State Tretyakov Gallery (Savitsky's personal exhibition, organised in 1955, was dedicated to the 50th anniversary of the artist's death). The canvas also participated in several exhibitions outside the former USSR.

== Description ==
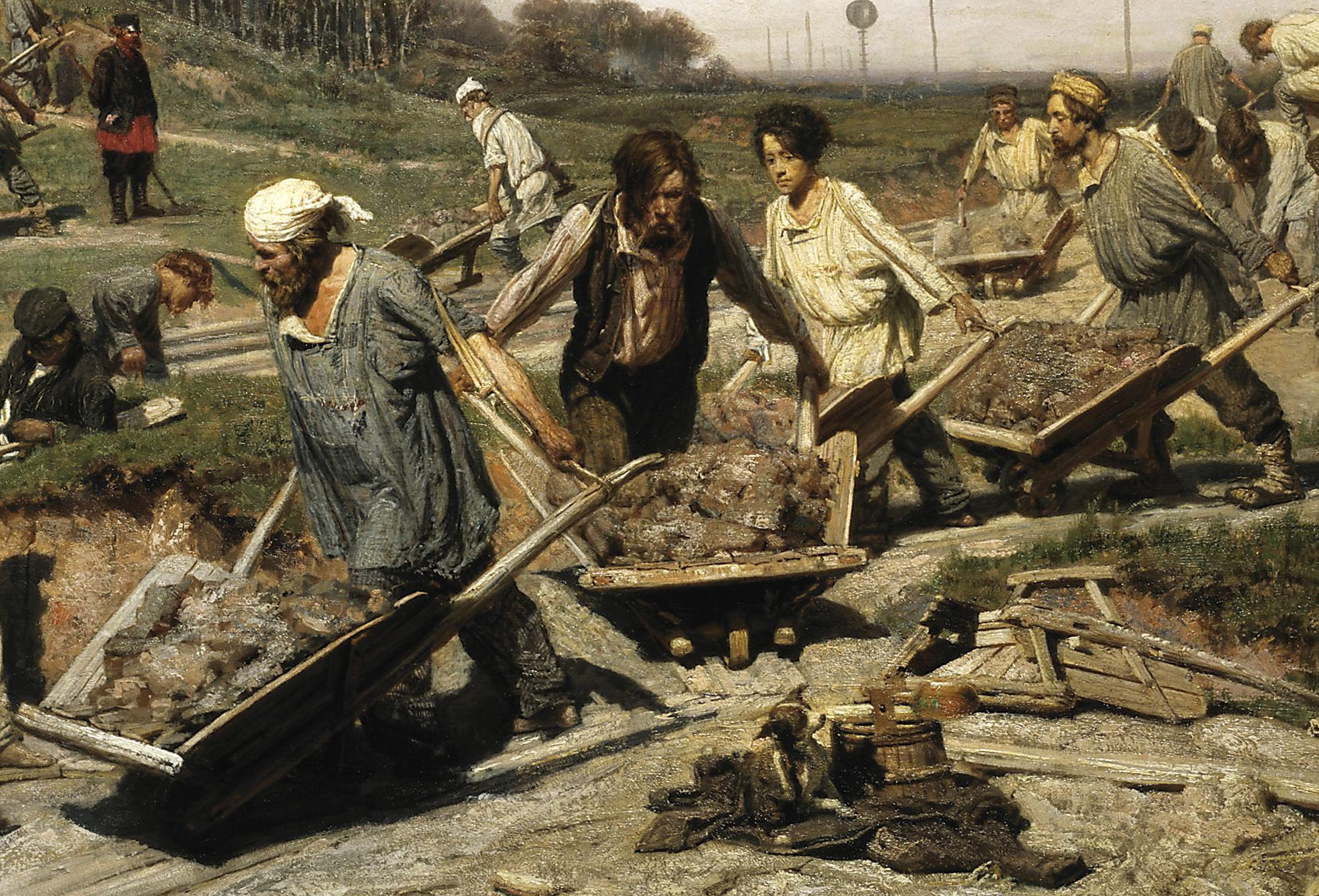
Central group with wheelbarrows (fragment of the painting)

The painting depicts the hard work of the labourers carrying earth and stones to repair the railway. Most of them appear to be seasonal labourers recruited from the peasantry. The workers are exhausted by the gruelling work, watched over by the overseer in the background. He is a foreman, whose image is reminiscent of the contractor in Nikolay Nekrasov's poem The Railway. However, there are no direct analogies to Nekrasov's characters.

The railway track is situated along a broad valley. On either side of the railway track, along the valley floor and the slopes that border it, are workers with wheelbarrows. They are walking on dusty ground, in places covered with wooden bridges. The diggers use shovels to fill the wheelbarrows with earth. Steep climbs and descents and deep potholes make the wheelbarrow drivers' work even harder. To prevent the wheelbarrows from falling to the ground, they are supported by straps placed on the shoulders of the workers. A broken wheelbarrow on the right-hand side of the painting testifies to the weight of the load. This is exacerbated by the heat. The labourers are working in unbuttoned shirts, some wearing headscarves or other head coverings. Despite the fact that they are dressed in old and tattered clothes, many of the workers depicted by Savitsky are attractive and even handsome.

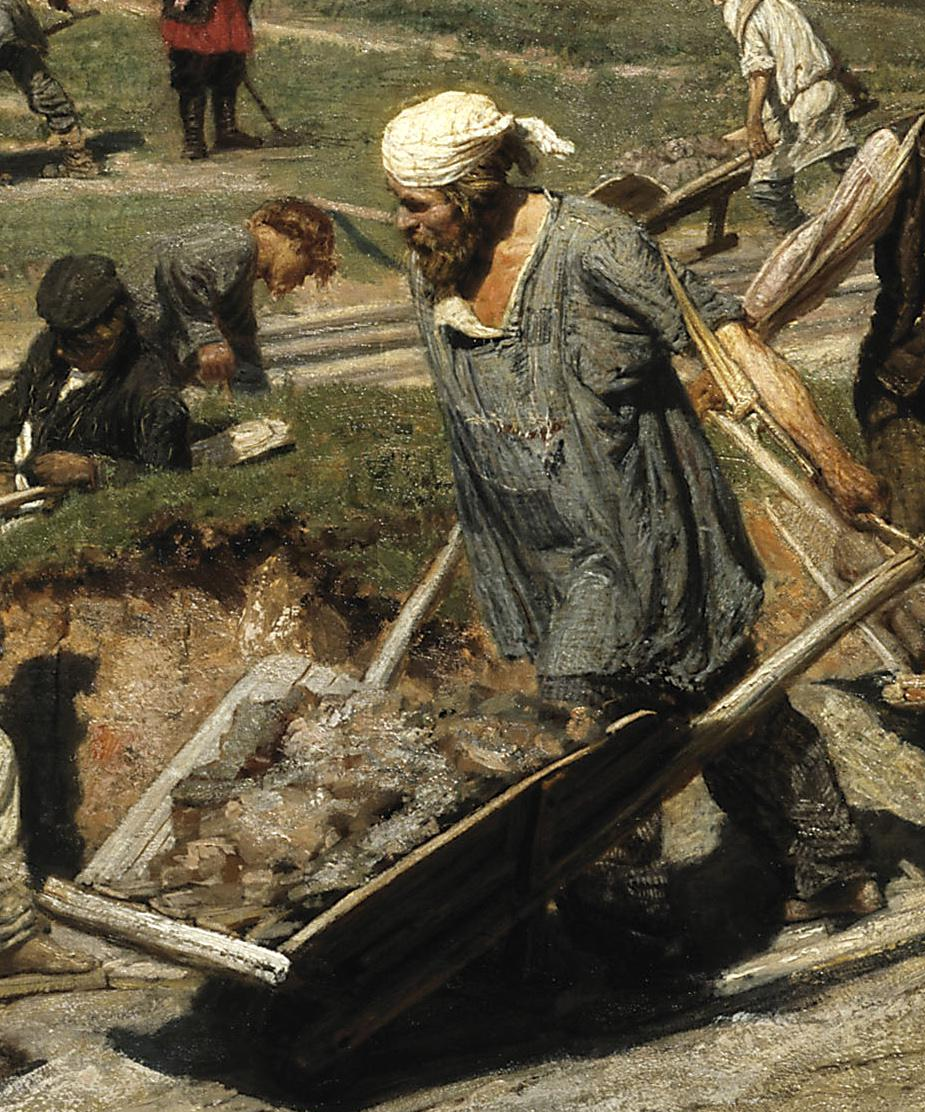
Worker in a white armband (K.A. Savitsky)

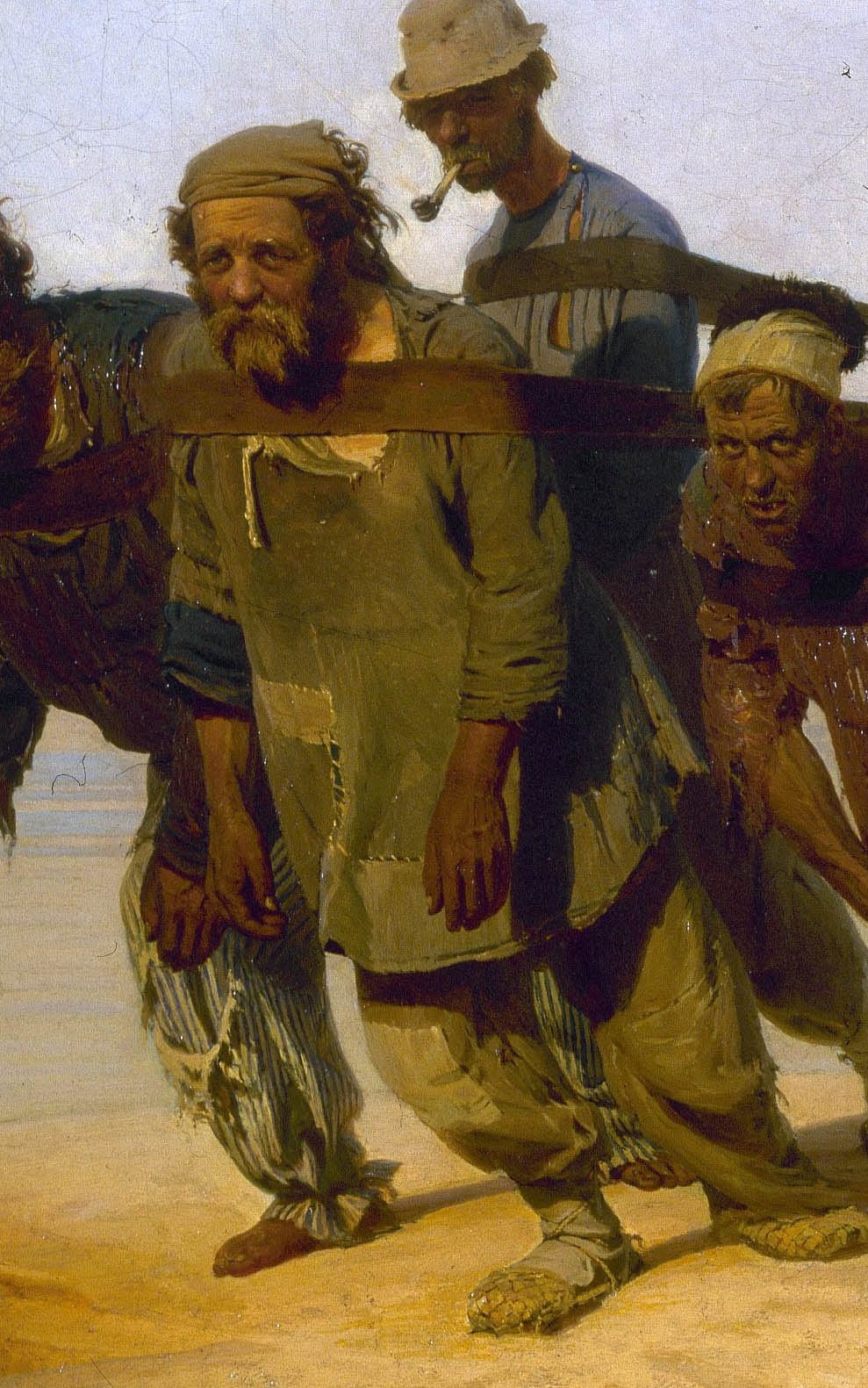
Burlak Kanin (I.E. Repin)

The most expressive and vivid images that "set the general tone of the painting" and "reveal its idea" are the close-ups of the four workers in the central part of the painting. The workers in this group seem to move from the depths of the painting towards the viewer. Among them (from left to right) is a mightly-looking worker with a wheelbarrow with a white bandage on his head; behind him, a grumpy worker with a moustache and dark hair covering his forehead, lost in his own thoughts; further away, a very young worker holding his wheelbarrow with the last of his strength; and behind him, another worker with a wheelbarrow.

The worker with a white bandage on his head, who leads the central group, stands out for his powerful physique and "attractive peasant face." This figure, which Savitsky had sketched in advance, was deliberately placed in the foreground by the artist. He has a concentrated and thoughtful expression, and his features are reminiscent of the Burlak Kanin in Ilya Repin's painting Burlaks on the Volga. Art historian Elena Levenfish has noted that the Burlak Kanin and the Worker with a White Armband, the central figures in Repin's and Savitsky's paintings, are characterised differently by the artists: while the "sad, questioning, intelligent gaze of the 'philosopher' Kanin" is turned towards the viewer "as if calling for sympathy," the worker in Savitsky's painting is "silent, concentrated, deep in thought," so that the viewer begins to believe that "behind his physical strength lurks a great spiritual power, that behind this silence ripens a protest."

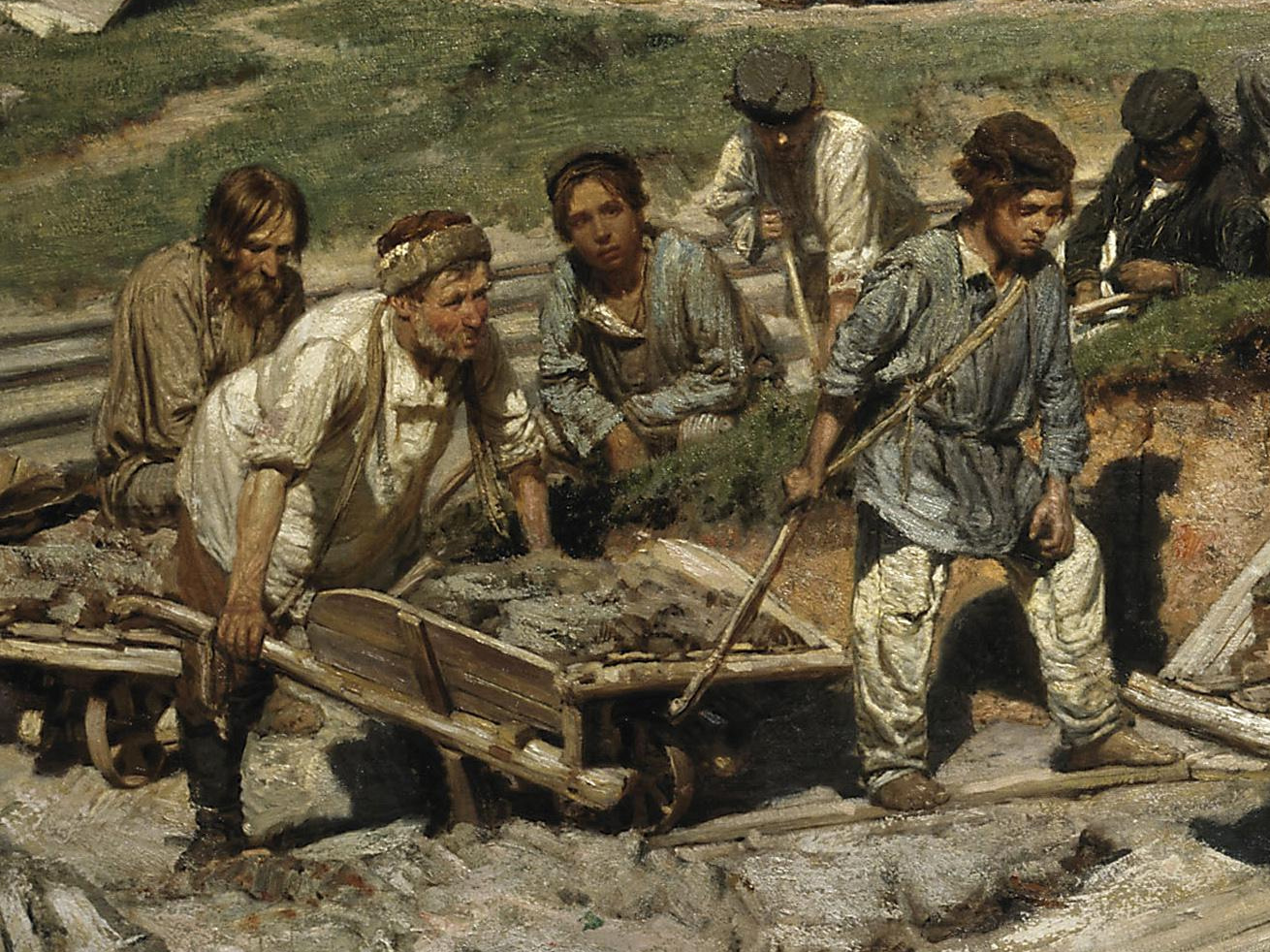
Left group of workers with wheelbarrows and diggers (fragment of the painting)

Second in the central group is a seasonal worker in a pink shirt and dark waistcoat. He is lost in thought, working in a gloomy daze, oblivious to anyone around him, thick strands of dark hair hanging over his eyes. The third in the group is a very young worker with a pale face and sharp features. He is a teenager doing the same hard work as the adults. The last of the group is a "lapotnik-podenshchik," pushing his wheelbarrow with difficulty. He is a man with a close-cropped beard and "noble facial features." His face reminds one a little of Konstantin Savitsky himself in his youth. He was not included in the preparatory studies: perhaps the idea of depicting himself among the workers came to the artist in the final stages of working on the canvas.

To the left of the central group is another group of diggers and workers with wheelbarrows. Two boys stand out among them. One of them, stopping to let a worker with a white bandage on his head pass with his wheelbarrow, is "a tired, dejected teenager, sorrowfully lowering his eyes before the strongman, who casts a sympathetic glance at him". The expression of the second boy in the group is obscured by the thick shadow cast by his cap. Nevertheless, his lean, slender figure, leaning forward, shows the utmost exertion of his boyish strength.

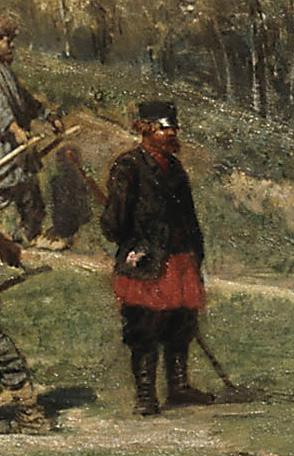
Overseer (fragment of the painting)

The image of the overseer, whose figure is removed into the depth of the painting, is notable. He is also known as a headman or contractor in art historical literature. He is depicted wearing greasy boots, a black waistcoat, and a red shirt, which serves as a striking contrast against the "general dim background." The brightness of his clothes attracts the viewer's attention, but at the same time he is isolated and "opposed to the main mass of people." Despite his isolation, the image of the overseer is not the leading one in Savitsky's work.

Images of working people and the instruments of their labour occupy almost the entire canvas. The artist creates an image of "primitive, day labor, depersonalising the work of the mass of workers." The workers follow each other, but the paths of different groups cross and they have to stop and wait. Although this "gives the impression of a hectic and diverse movement of a large number of people," in the painting "everything is coordinated and balanced."

The complexity of the composition of the painting was that Savitsky had to place "a large number of people moving in different directions" on the canvas. According to art historian Zinaida Zonova, the artist mastered this task perfectly, managing to make "the content of the painting immediately perceptible through the clarity of the means used to express the idea of the plot." To fill the void in the centre of the painting, which was "too conspicuous in the overall busyness of the composition," Savitsky placed a puppy next to a tub and a broken wheelbarrow slightly to the right.

Furthermore, the compositional assemblage of the canvas is facilitated by the pictorial gamut, in which, according to Zonova, Savitsky "perfectly accounted for the impact of the light and air environment: as if shrouded by a veil, the air gives a certain dullness to the colouring and helps to unite the figures." The rejection of bright local light in favour of a general palette was a new phenomenon in painting in the 1870s. The dominant tones in Savitsky's work are yellowish-brown, grey-blue and greenish. The artist also used subtle blues and purples in the general brownish tones of the excavated earth. Only the red hue of the overseer's shirt and two reddish patches on the diggers' clothing in the right-hand part of the canvas stand out. In general, the colour palette of the painting can be described as "muted and restrained." The desolate mood of the canvas corresponds to the "somewhat monotonous landscape with thinning forest on the hillside behind the embankment and a series of alternating telegraph poles."

== Sketches and studies ==
Two studies for the painting are held in the State Tretyakov Gallery. One is A Worker with a Wheelbarrow (oil on canvas, 19.9 × 19.6 cm, inv. 11168, was in the collection of Ilya Ostroukhov, came in 1929 from the Ostroukhov Museum), and the other is Repair Work on the Railway (oil on canvas on cardboard, 18.2 × 25.8 cm, inv. 6262, was in the collection of David Vysotsky, received in 1925 from the 5th Proletarian Museum). Another study, entitled Repair Work at the Railway Track, is held in the collection of the National Art Museum of Belarus. It seems likely that this is the same study that appeared in a 1959 monograph under the title Earthworks near the railway track (canvas on cardboard, oil, 12.3 × 32.5 cm), which was described as having been kept in a private collection in Moscow. The same monograph presented a rationale for why the inscription of the date '1875' on the study was erroneous and proposed that its creation should be attributed to 1873.

Painted studies for the painting Repair Work on the Railway

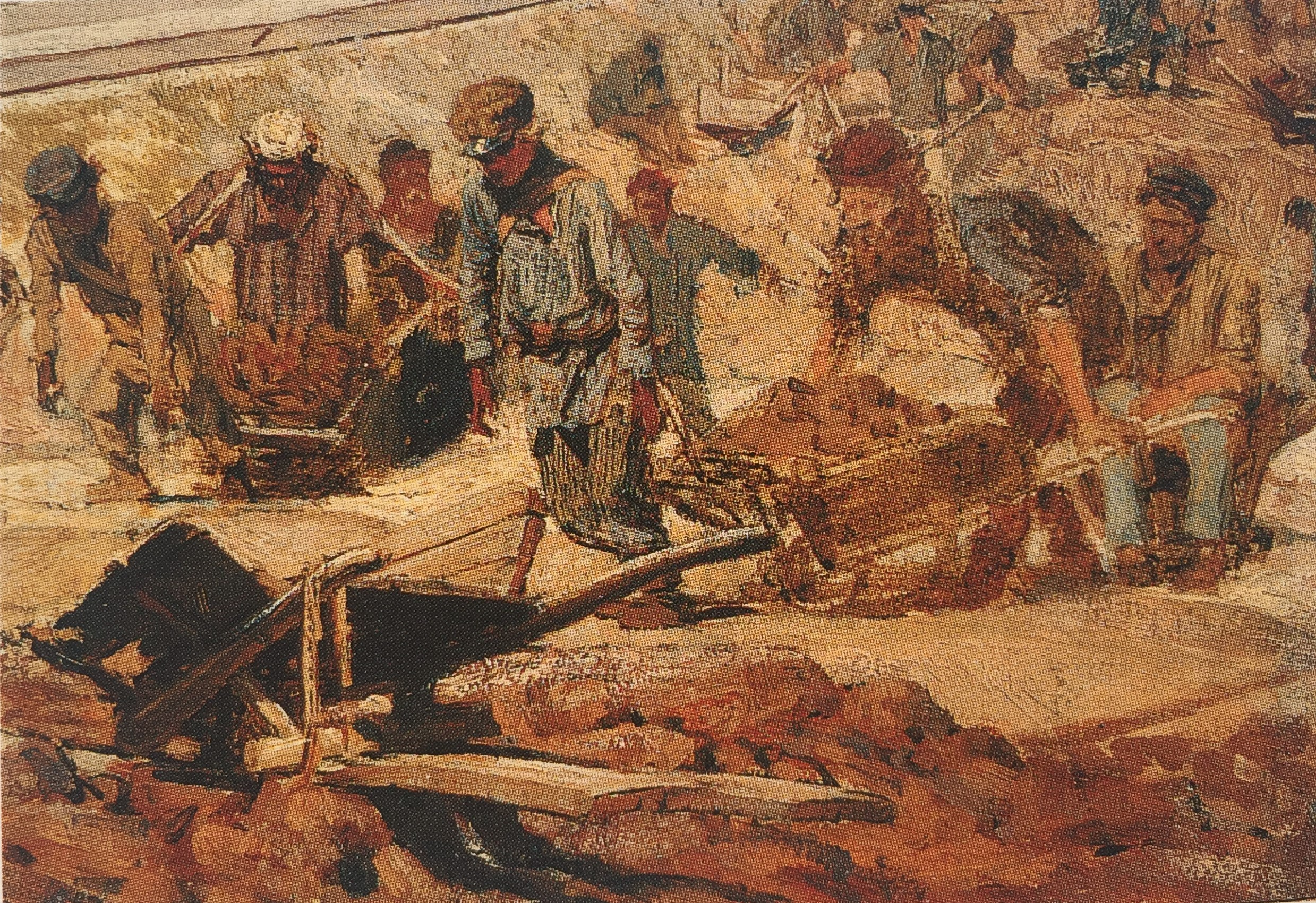
Repair work on the railway (sketch, 1873–1874, State Tretyakov Gallery)

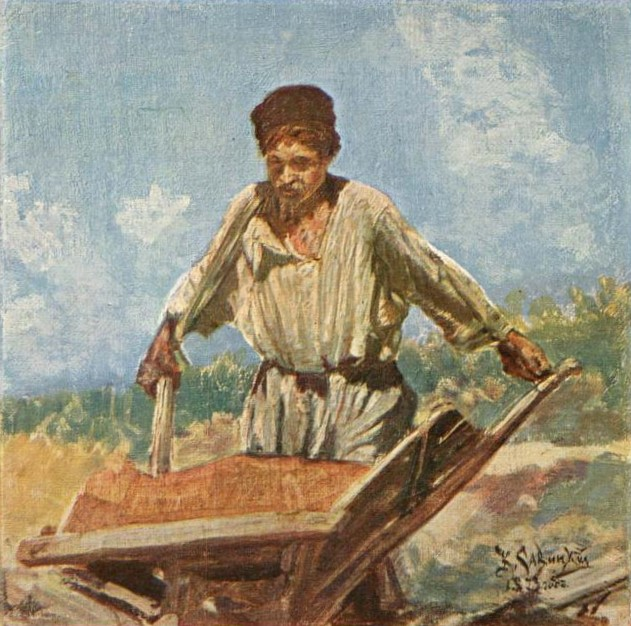
Worker with a wheelbarrow (sketch, 1873, State Tretyakov Gallery)

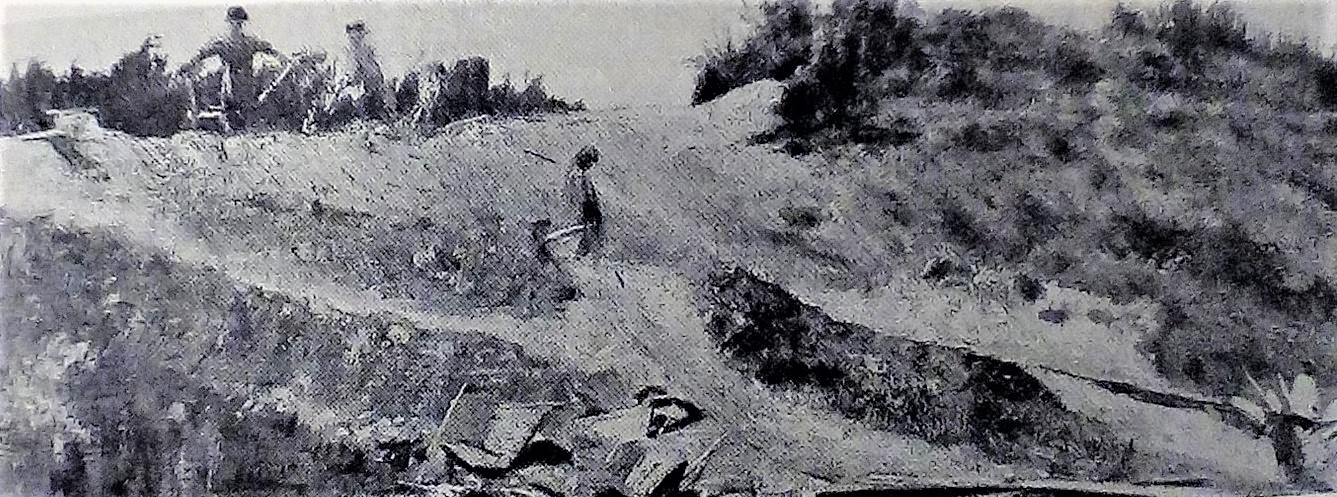
Earthworks near the railway track (sketch, 1874; presumably National Art Museum of the Republic of Belarus)

The Pozhalostin Museum houses a watercolour sketch of the painting Repair Work on the Railway (paper, watercolour, 28 × 46 cm, inv. 176-r). This sketch was gifted by Savitsky to the writer Alexei Moshin, was then in the collection of the Ryazan artist Yakov Kalinichenko and was given to the Museum by his widow. Another sketch with the same title (cardboard, watercolour, 20.5 × 26.5 cm), kept in the collection of the Kyiv Art Gallery until 1941, was lost during the Great Patriotic War. The State Russian Museum holds a drawing comprising several studies, entitled A peasant's head in a bandage. Legs. Hand (paper, graphic pencil, 25.4 × 21.2 cm). This was previously in the collections of Ivan Tsvetkov (Moscow) and Sergei Botkin (St Petersburg). The Kyiv Art Gallery houses a drawing entitled Train on the railway tracks (paper, pencil, whitewash, 13.9 × 28.8 cm), which was previously in the collection of the Kyiv Drawing School.

Graphic and watercolour sketches and studies for the painting Repair Work on the Railway

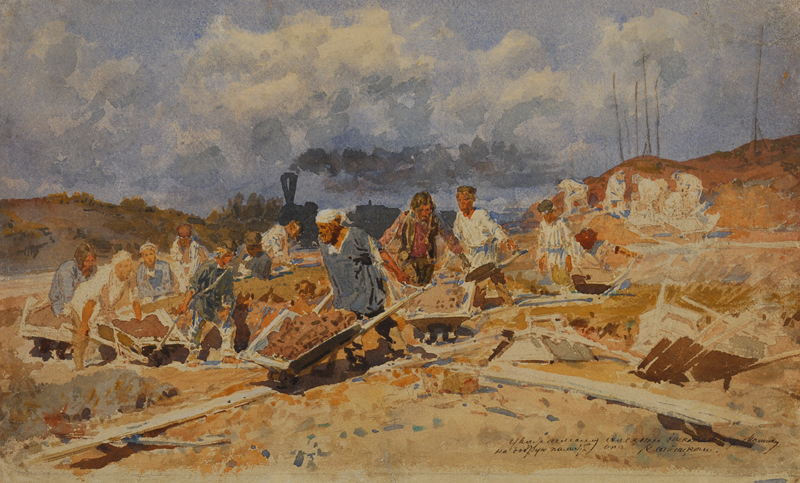
Repair work on the railway (sketch, watercolour, 1873, Pozhalostin Museum)

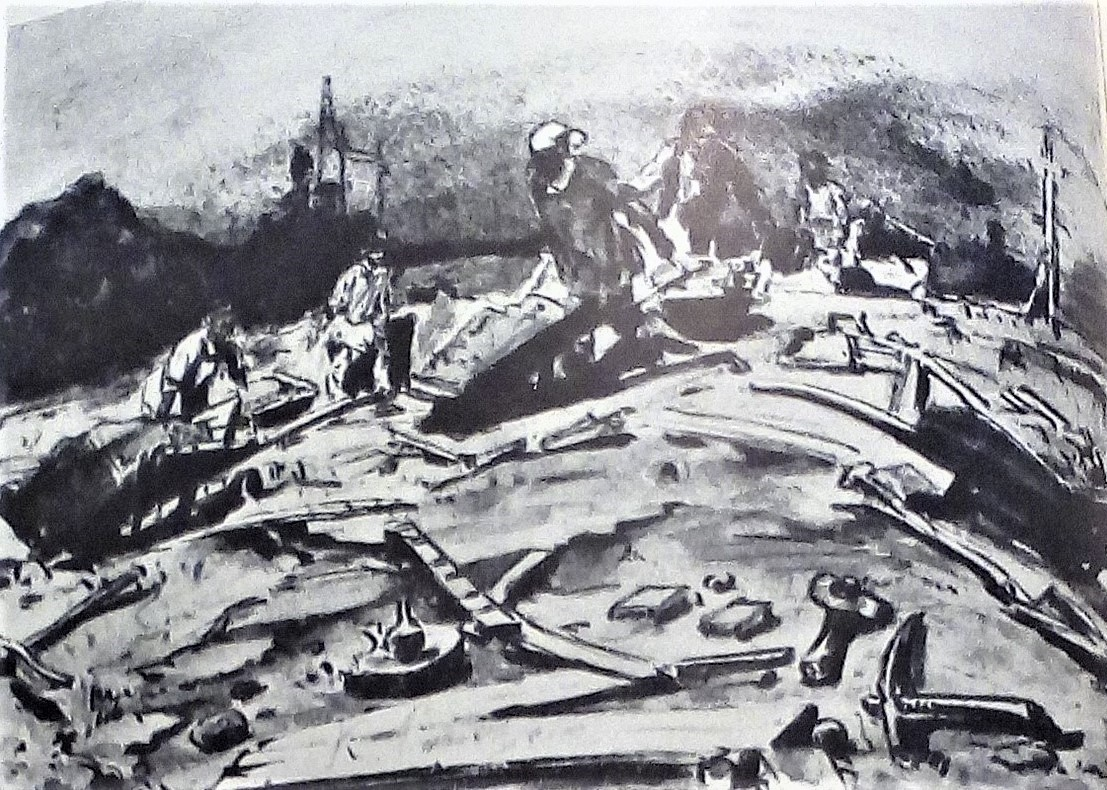
Repair work on the railway (sketch, watercolour, 1873, formerly in the Kyiv Art Gallery)

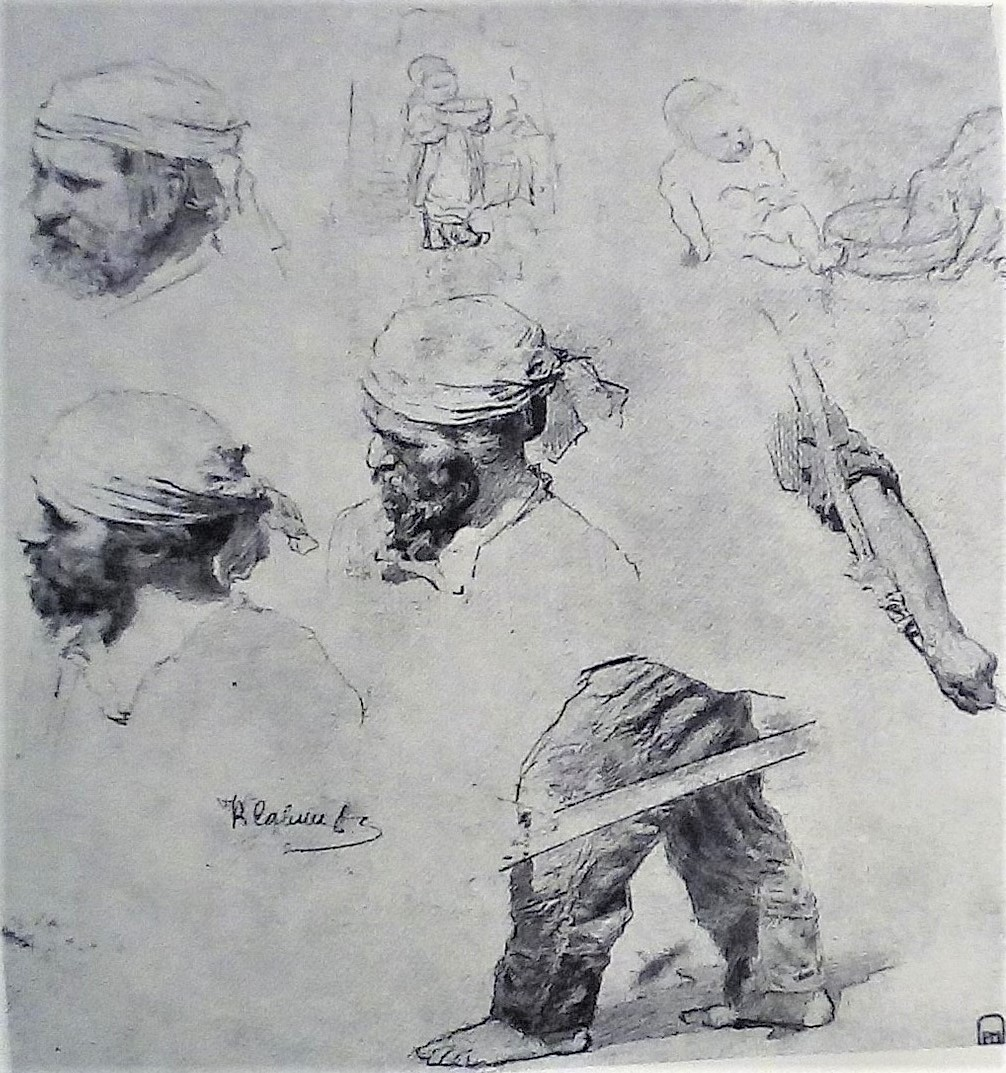
A peasant's head in a bandage. Legs. Hand (drawing, 1873, State Russian Museum)

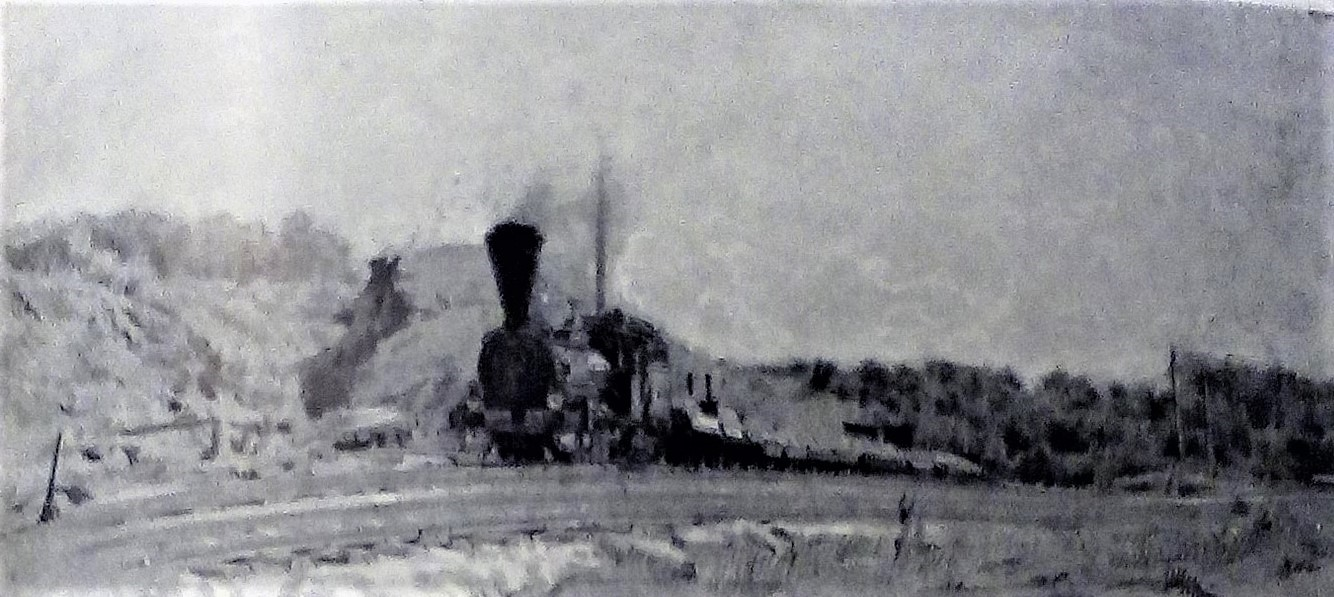
Train on the railway tracks (drawing, graphic pencil, whitewash, 1873, Kyiv Art Gallery)

== Reviews and criticism ==
The artist and critic Alexandre Benois wrote in his book History of Russian Painting in the 19th Century, the first edition of which was published in 1902, that Savitsky became "an important pillar of the Peredvizhniki" with the appearance of his painting Repair Work on the Railway in 1874. Benois noted that Savitsky's canvas, depicting "unfortunate day labourers with wheelbarrows" weaving through dust and sand, was "homogeneous in spirit and theme" with Ilya Repin's Burlaks on the Volga. Benois asserts that Savitsky's key advantages over other artists were his objectivity and "serious attention to landscape, types and poses." In Repair Work in particular "everything is so simply and calmly drawn from nature" that it renders the work distinct from that of a typical Peredvizhnik. In the view of Benois, even if technically Savitsky's most accomplished paintings, including Repair Work on the Railway, are inferior to Repin's works, they are nevertheless "quite satisfactory works, standing well above the general level of the school."

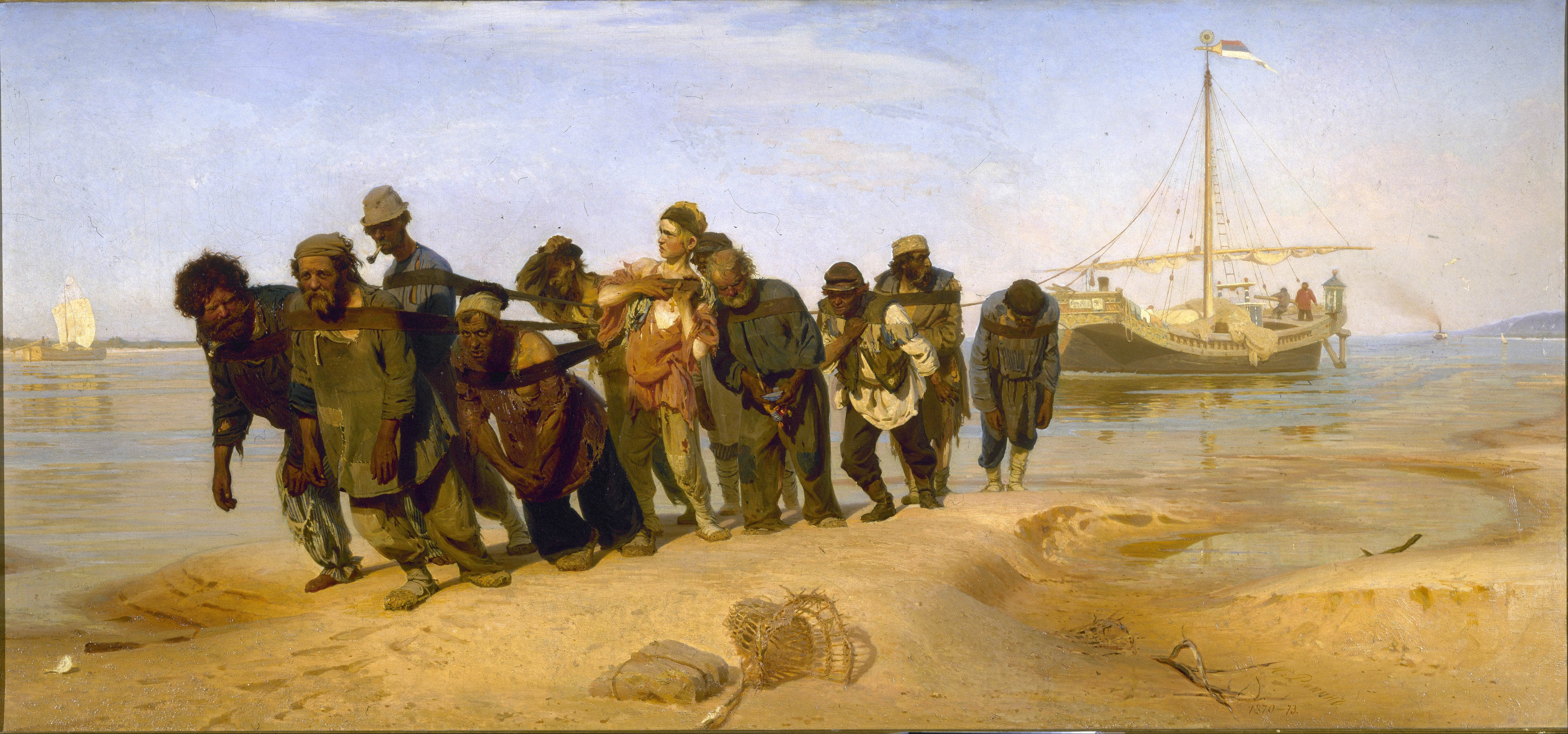
I.E. Repin. Burlaks on the Volga (1872—1873, State Russian Museum)

In 1947, art historian Mikhail Sokolnikov posited that the painting Repair Work on the Railway made a strong impression on contemporaries, including Pavel Tretyakov, who regarded it as one of the works that "marked the emergence of a new Russian school of painting." Sokolnikov noted that Savitsky, in his first multi-figure composition, was one of the first in Russian fine art – after Repin's Burlaks – to "raise the subject of the working man" and draw society's attention to "one of the sickest phenomena of reality." In Sokolnikov's view, Savitsky's handling of the complex subject matter of the painting Repair Work is marked by "great artistic tact", with the content "logically unfolding from the entire ensemble of the composition."

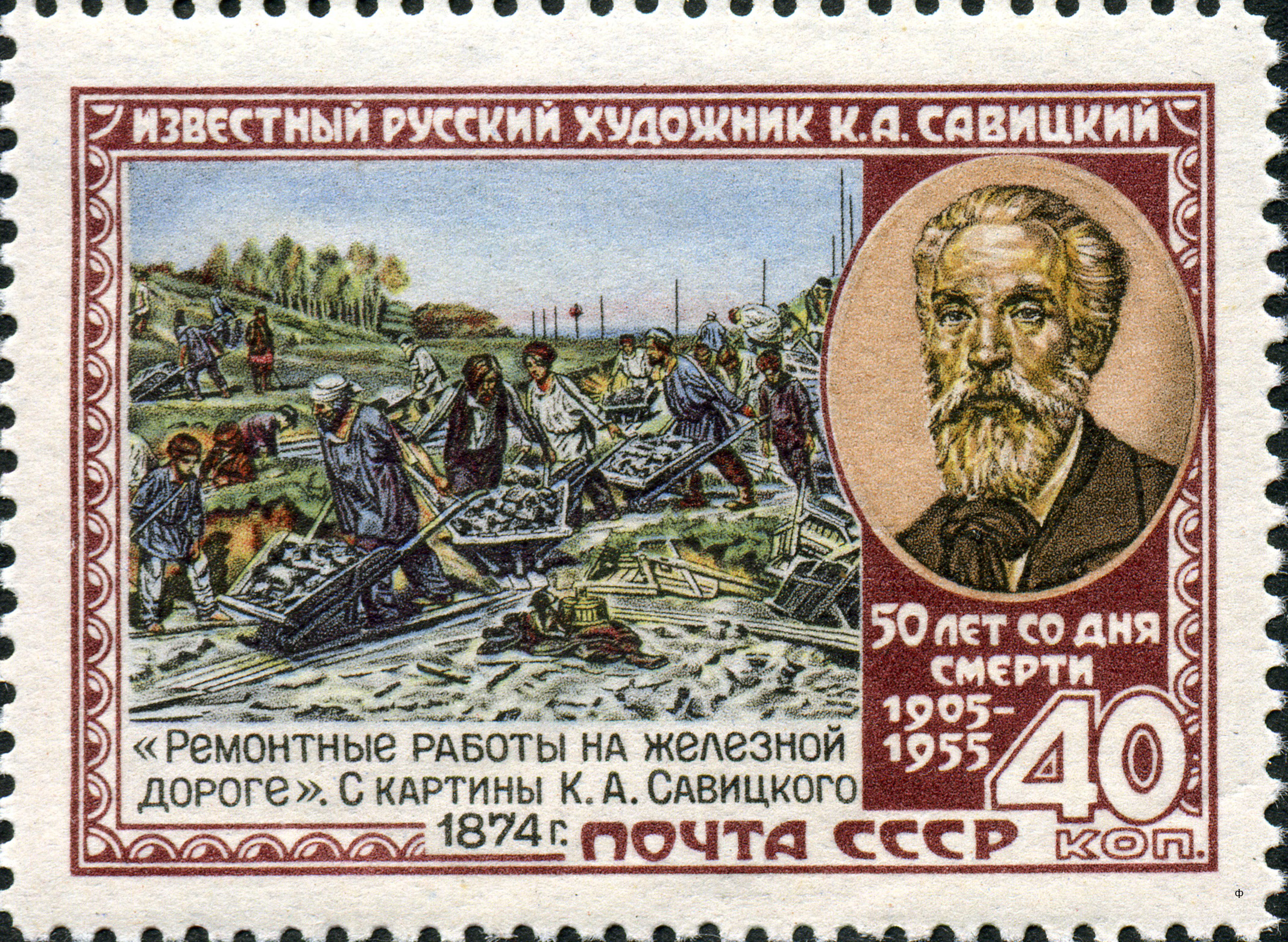
Painting Repair Work on the Railway on a 1955 USSR postage stamp

In a book published in 1955, the art historian Dmitri Sarabianov also noted that the painting Repair Work on the Railway had some similarities with Burlaks on the Volga. Sarabianov wrote that Savitsky "looks for his heroes among people who have broken up with the land, who have left peasant life – among those impoverished peasants who are constantly joining the ranks of the proletariat." Sarabianov noted that some of the characters depicted in the painting suggest that the artist "sought not only to criticise reality, but also to affirm positive folk images, that is, a more general interpretation of the folk scene." According to Sarabianov, Burlaks on the Volga and Repair Work are "a significant milestone in the history of Russian art, in the development of the theme of the people in Russian painting."

In a 1959 monograph on Savitsky's work, the art historian Elena Levenfish wrote that in Repair Work the artist "for the first time pays great attention to the psychological characterisation of the heroes he finds among the people." Discussing the analogy between the repairmen and Repin's burlaks, Levenfish acknowledged that Repin's talent and innovation may have influenced Savitsky, but, according to her, "Savitsky had no direct imitation". Levenfish noted that "in terms of the strength of its public impact, 'Repair Work on the Railway' was one of the most outstanding paintings at the first travelling exhibitions" and later became "the same textbook work as Nekrasov's poem 'Railway', which preceded it." In the initial section of the ninth volume of the History of Russian Art, published in 1965, art historian Sofia Goldstein designated Savitsky's Repair Work as "the first significant work of the novice master, which brought him well-deserved recognition."

== Bibliography ==
- Benois, Alexandre (1995). Istoriya russkoy zhivopisi v XIX veke История русской живописи в XIX веке [History of Russian painting in the 19th century] (in Russian). Moscow: Respublika. ISBN 5-250-02524-2.
- Goldstein, S.N. (1965). "Razvitiye bytovogo zhanra v 1870—1880-e gody" Развитие бытового жанра в 1870—1880–е годы [Development of the domestic genre in the 1870s–1880s]. Istoriya russkogo iskusstva История русского искусства [History of Russian Art] (in Russian). Vol. 9, book 1. Igor Grabar, Vladimir Kemenov, Viktor Lazarev. Moscow: Nauka. pp. 300–361.
- Gorina, T.N.; Prytkov, V.A. (1964). "Krestyanskaya tema v zhanrovoy zhivopisi peredvizhnikov — V. M. Maksimova, I. M. Pryanishnikova, G. G. Myasoyedova, K. A. Savitskogo" Крестьянская тема в жанровой живописи передвижников — В. М. Максимова, И. М. Прянишникова, Г. Г. Мясоедова, К. А. Савицкого [Peasant theme in the genre painting of the Peredvizhniki – V.M. Maximov, I.M. Pryanishnikov, G.G. Myasoedov, K.A. Savitsky]. Russkaya zhanrovaya zhivopis XIX — nachala XX veka Русская жанровая живопись XIX — начала XX века [Russian genre painting of the 19th – early 20th century] (in Russian). Moscow: Iskusstvo. pp. 167–206.
- Zonova, Z.T. (1958). "Istoriya sozdaniya kartiny K. A. Savitskogo «Remontnye raboty na zheleznoy doroge»" История создания картины К. А. Савицкого «Ремонтные работы на железной дороге» [History of the creation of K.A. Savitsky's painting "Repair work on the railway"]. Gosudarstvennaya Tretyakovskaya galereya. Materialy i issledovaniya, t. 2 Государственная Третьяковская галерея. Материалы и исследования, т. 2 [State Tretyakov Gallery. Materials and studies, vol. 2] (in Russian). Moscow: Sovetsky khudozhnik. pp. 115–124.
- Levenfish, Е.G. (1959). Konstantin Apollonovich Savitsky Константин Аполлонович Савицкий [Konstantin Apollonovich Savitsky] (in Russian). Leningrad—Moscow: Iskusstvo.
- Porudominsky, V.I. (1979). Pervaya Tretyakovka Первая Третьяковка [First Tretyakovka]. Bibliotechnaya seriya (in Russian). Moscow: Detskaya Literatura.
- Repin, Ilya (1969). Izbrannye pisma Избранные письма [Selected Letters] (in Russian). Vol. 1 (1867—1892). Moscow: Iskusstvo.
- Roginskaya, F.S. (1989). Tovarishchestvo peredvizhnykh khudozhestvennykh vystavok Товарищество передвижных художественных выставок [Society for Travelling Art Exhibitions] (in Russian). Moscow: Iskusstvo.
- Sarabianov, D.V. (1955). Narodno-osvoboditelnye idei russkoy zhivopisi vtoroy poloviny XIX veka Народно-освободительные идеи русской живописи второй половины XIX века [People's liberation ideas in Russian painting of the second half of the 19th century] (in Russian). Moscow: Iskusstvo.
- Seleznyova, Е.L. (2006). "P. M. Tretyakov i Vsemirnaya parizhskaya vystavka 1878 goda" П. М. Третьяков и Всемирная парижская выставка 1878 года [P.M. Tretyakov and the Paris World's Fair of 1878] (PDF). Tretyakov Gallery (in Russian) (1): 22–27.
- Sokolnikov, M.P. (1947). Savitsky Савицкий [Savitsky]. Massovaya biblioteka «Iskusstvo» (in Russian). Moscow: Iskusstvo.
- Shashkova, N.O. (2016). "Znacheniye Moskovsko-Kurskoy zheleznoy dorogi v razvitii sistemy zheleznodorozhnykh soobshcheny Rossii" Значение Московско-Курской железной дороги в развитии системы железнодорожных сообщений России [The importance of the Moscow-Kursk railway in the development of Russia's railway communications system]. ETAP: Ekonomicheskaya Teoriya, Analiz, Praktika (in Russian) (4): 83–107.
- Sher, N.S. (1966). Rasskazy o russkikh khudozhnikakh Рассказы о русских художниках [Stories about Russian artists] (in Russian). Moscow: Detskaya Literatura.
- Gosudarstvennaya Tretyakovskaya galereya — katalog sobraniya Государственная Третьяковская галерея — каталог собрания [State Tretyakov Gallery - catalogue of the collection] (in Russian). Vol. 4: Painting of the Second Half of the 19th Century, Book 2, Н–Я. Y.V. Bruk, L.I. Iovleva. Moscow: Krasnaya ploshchad. 2006. ISBN 5-900743-22-5.
- Konstantin Apollonovich Savitsky. Vystavka proizvedeny — katalog Константин Аполлонович Савицкий. Выставка произведений — каталог [Konstantin Apollonovich Savitsky. Exhibition of works – catalogue] (in Russian). S.N. Goldstein, S.A. Grzhebina. Moscow: Sovetsky khudozhnik. 1955.
- Russkaya khudozhestvennaya kultura kontsa XIX — nachala XX veka Русская художественная культура конца XIX — начала XX века [Russian art culture of the late 19th – early 20th century] (in Russian). Vol. 2: Fine Arts. Architecture. Decorative and applied arts. А.D. Alekseev and others. Moscow: Nauka. 1969.
- Tovarishchestvo peredvizhnykh khudozhestvennykh vystavok. Pisma, dokumenty. 1869—1899 Товарищество передвижных художественных выставок. Письма, документы. 1869—1899 [Society for Travelling Art Exhibitions. Letters, documents. 1869–1899] (in Russian). V.V. Andreeva, М.V. Astafieva, S.N. Goldstein, N.L. Pryimak. Moscow: Iskusstvo. 1987.
- Catalogue de la section russe à l'Exposition universelle de Paris. Paris: Lahure. 1878.
