= The Volga Boatman =

The Volga Boatman may refer to:

- A burlak (barge hauler) on the Volga River
- The Volga Boatman (1926 film), an American drama film directed by Cecil B. DeMille
- The Volga Boatman (1936 film), a French drama film directed by Vladimir Strizhevsky
- "The Song of the Volga Boatmen", a traditional Russian song
- Barge Haulers on the Volga, a painting by Ilya Repin
