= Pozhalostin Museum =

Pozhalostin Ryazan Regional and State Art Museum
- Рязанский государственный областной художественный музей имени И. П. Пожалостина
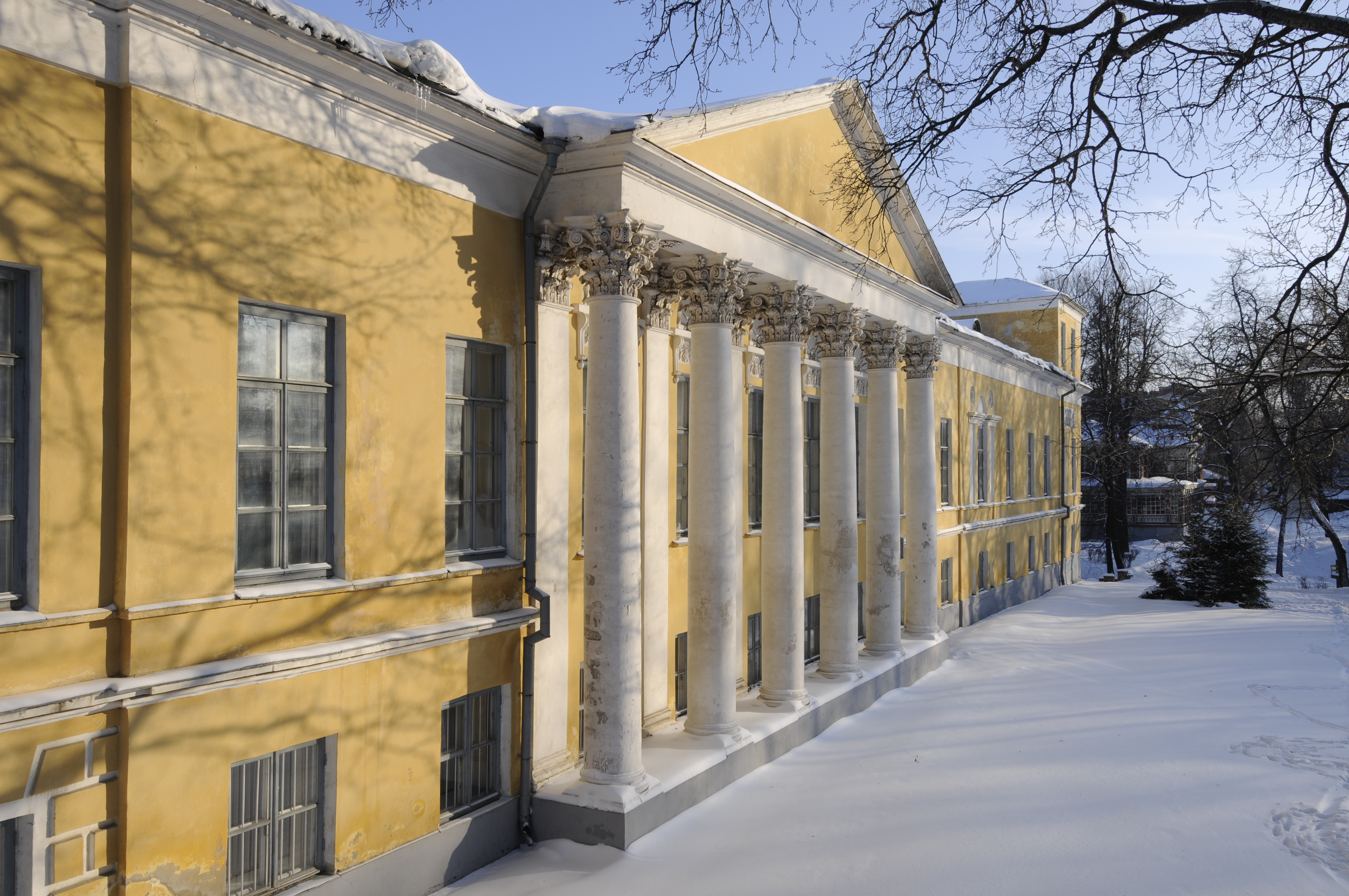
- The museum's façade
- Established: 1913; 113 years ago
- Location: Svoboda street, Ryazan, Russia
- Coordinates: 54.6270°N 39.7514°E
- Type: Art museum
- Collection size: about 12,000 items
- Director: Marina Kotova
- Website: www.artmuseum62.ru

The Pozhalostin Ryazan Regional and State Art Museum (Russian: Рязанский государственный областной художественный музей имени И. П. Пожалостина) is one of the oldest art museums in Russia. It houses about 12,000 items of Russian and Western Art, mainly paintings, graphics, sculptures, traditional arts and crafts, dating from the late 15th to the late 20th centuries. Its Western collection includes some works of the painters of the Flemish, French, and Italian schools, as well as porcelain items from English, German, and French manufacturers. A number of paintings, drawings, and sculptures, including several ancient icons, represent the museum's Russian Art collection. The works of Ryazan artists (including traditional clothing, glass, clay toys, etc.) occupy an important part of the exposition.

== History ==
The museum was found in 1913 as Prof. Ivan Pozhalostin Art and History Museum Society. Among the members of the above-mentioned society were prominent local artists and other Ryazan intellectuals. The endowment from some Moscow painters as well as the items of Prof. Pozhalostin's private collection formed the basis of the future museum.

The museum became municipal property in January 1915 and opened to the public on 23 March 1915. Its first catalogue included 72 items, in particular, approximately fifty notable works of Russian artists dating from the early 20th century. The museum occupied three rooms in the building of Romanov college (24 Seminarskaya street; currently that two-story redbrick building became a part of Ryazan State University). In 1918, it was incorporated into the Ryazan Governorate local history museum. Twenty years later, the Department of Arts of the above-mentioned institution obtained its present name. As a part of the local museum – and later, as a separate organization – it occupied the two-story stone building of the Ryazan Consistory, inside the Ryazan Kremlin. Since 1980, the museum resides in the former Ryumin mansion (belonged to the merchant and millionaire Ryumin in the 1st half of the 19th cent.).

== Collections ==
=== Ancient Russian Art ===
The collection has been formed as a result of the expeditionary work of the museum's staff in the 1960s – 1970s.

A number of unique exhibits came from the Ryazan Diocesan Archives and the Ryazan Scientific Archive Commission Museum. Most of such items demanded some restoration.

The collection includes the Russian icons dating from the late of the 15th century; a few of them represent the local Ryazan school (e.g., those are two unique depictions of Archangel Michael).

Most of the works, e.g., the collection of the wooden carved Royal doors, date from the 17th to the 19th cent.

=== Russian painting, graphics, sculpture (XVII–XX cent.) ===
The largest and the most prominent collection of the museum. It began with the first exhibits donated by the Moscow painters. For the following decades, the collection expanded through the State museum fund, private collections, acquisitions from contemporary artists. It represents the development of Russian visual arts, their stylistic mainstreams, artistic movements and personalities. The museum owns a number of paintings by Vladimir Borovikovsky, Alexey Venetsianov, Vasily Tropinin, Alexei Savrasov, Vasily Surikov, Ilya Repin, Konstantin Korovin, as well as by Abram Arkhipov, Filipp Malyavin, whose life and work were influenced by Ryazan. Its collection includes some drawings by Aleksander Orłowski, Pyotr Sokolov, Ivan Shishkin, Fyodor Vasilyev, Valentin Serov, Mikhail Vrubel, Wassili Kandinsky, other members of Mir iskusstva, of the Blue Rose. The museum holds a few works of such Soviet artists as Ivan Shadr, Alexander Kibalnikov, Yevgeny Vuchetich.

=== Western painting and drawing (XVI–XIX cent.) ===
The collection, based on the receipts from the former noble estates located in Ryazan Governorate (e.g. ones of the Gagarin family), includes some works of the painters of the Flemish, French, Italian, and other Western schools. The museum owns one of the two easel works by Giovanni Battista Crosato on public view in Russia, The Sacrifice of Polyxena. It holds several paintings by Vincenzo Catena, Francesco Guardi, Adriaen van Ostade, Justus van Huysum, Simon Vouet, Philippe de Champaigne.

A few of watercolours by Giacinto Gigante, Gabriele Carelli and other artists represent Western drawing.

=== Applied arts ===
The collection includes examples of furniture, artistic porcelain, glass, ceramic of Russian and Western manufacturers, such as Imperial Porcelain Factory (Saint Petersburg), private companies of Francis Gardner, Prince Yusupov. There are several samples of artistic glass made by the leading manufacturers from Russia (18th – 20th cent.). Sèvres and Meissen porcelain production became the core of the Western part of the collection.

The museum holds only a few pieces of handmade furniture; the most noteworthy items are a Dutch carved sideboard (17th cent.) and a Russian bureau (the 1st third of the 19th cent.).

=== Ryazan traditional arts and crafts ===
Ryazan land is one of the ancient centers of Russian traditional folk arts. The collection was created mainly after the expeditionary work of the museum's staff in the 1960s – 1970s. The collected items of the traditional folk costume, a complex artistic ensemble, represent different types and techniques of patterned weaving and embroidery.

The museum holds a lot of works made by contemporary artisans, including the samples of Mikhailov coloured embroidery, Skopin ceramic, traditional clay toy.

== Structure ==
=== Branches ===
==== Pozhalostin's House ====
Pozhalostin's House is a house museum, located in Solotcha, Ryazan, which was formerly home of engraver, academician Ivan Pozhalostin. Opened in 1992, it holds many works of the artist and a lot of photographs dedicated to his life.

==== Viktor Ivanov and Ryazan Land Art Gallery ====
The gallery at 14 Pervomaysky avenue, Ryazan, opened before the 80th anniversary of the Russian artist and academician, Viktor Ivanov. Its collection includes over 600 of his works, in particular, the landscapes, portraits, drawings, related to the Ryazan period of his life.
