= Barge Haulers on the Volga =

1873 painting by Ilya Repin

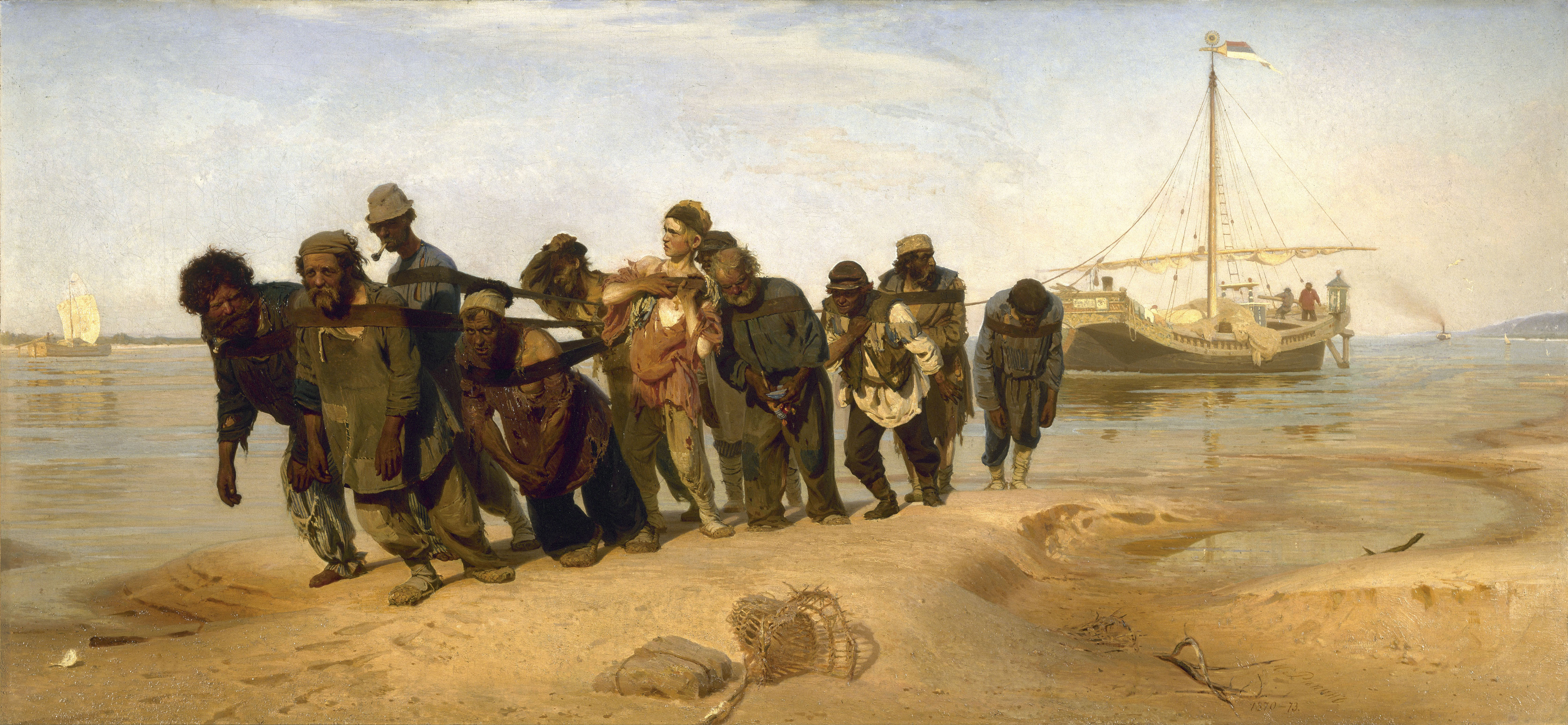
- Artist: Ilya Repin
- Year: 1870–1873
- Medium: Oil-on-canvas
- Dimensions: 131.5 cm × 281 cm (51.8 in × 111 in)
- Location: State Russian Museum, St. Petersburg

Barge Haulers on the Volga or Burlaki (Russian: Бурлаки на Волге, Burlaki na Volge) is an 1870–1873 oil-on-canvas painting by Russian realist artist Ilya Repin. It depicts 11 men (burlaki) hauling a barge along the banks of the Volga River. They are at the point of collapse from exhaustion, oppressed by heavy, hot weather.

Although they are presented as stoical and accepting, the men are defeated; only one stands out: in the center of both the row and canvas, a brightly colored youth fights against his leather binds and takes on a heroic pose.

Repin conceived the painting during his travels through Russia as a young man and depicts actual characters he encountered. It drew international praise for its realistic portrayal of the hardships of working men, and launched his career. Soon after its completion, the painting was purchased by Grand Duke Vladimir Alexandrovich and exhibited widely throughout Europe as a landmark of Russian realist painting. Barge Haulers on the Volga has been described as "perhaps the most famous painting of the Peredvizhniki movement [for]....its unflinching portrayal of backbreaking labor".

== Background ==
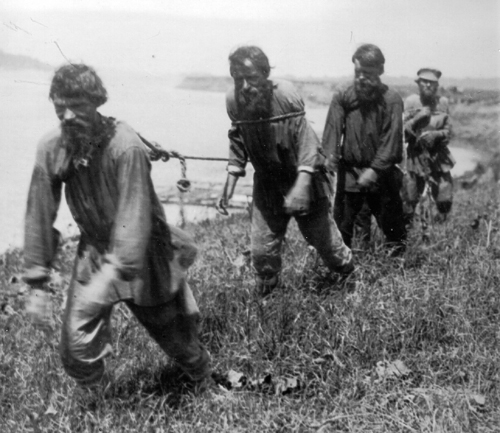
1900s photograph of burlaks on the Volga River

Repin was accepted into the Imperial Academy of Art in St. Petersburg in 1863. The academy at the time was known for its deep conservatism and leaning towards academic art, a fact that bred a sense of revolt and desire for change in many of its students.

Barge Haulers was inspired by scenes witnessed by Repin while holidaying on the Volga in 1870. He made a number of preparatory studies, mostly in oil, while staying in Shiriaev Buerak, near Stavropol-on-Volga. The sketches include landscapes, and views of the Volga and barge haulers.

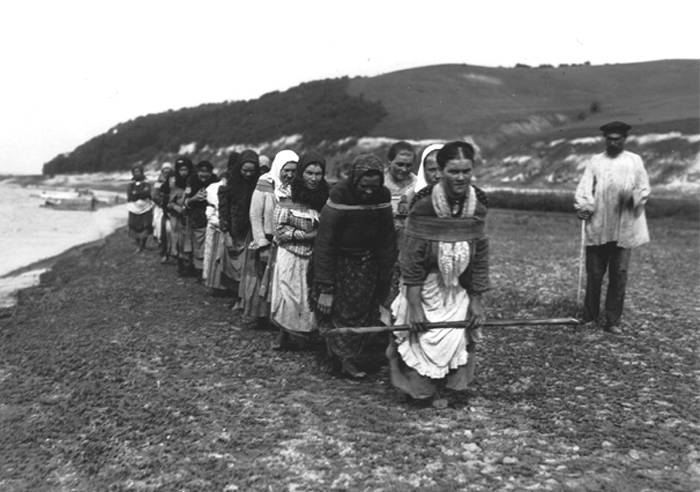
Burlak women, 1900s

The characters are based on actual people Repin came to know while preparing for the work. He had had difficulty finding subjects to pose for him, even for a fee, because of a folklorish belief that a subject's soul would leave the body once its image was put down on paper. The subjects include a former soldier, a former priest, and a painter. Although he depicted eleven men, women also performed the work and there were normally many more people in a barge-hauling gang; Repin selected these figures as representative of a broad swathe of the working classes of Russian society. That some had once held relatively high social positions dismayed the young artist, who had initially planned to produce a far more superficial work contrasting exuberant day-trippers (which he himself had been) with the careworn burlaks. Repin found a particular empathy with Kanin, the defrocked priest, who is portrayed as the lead hauler and looks outwards towards the viewer. The artist wrote,

There was something eastern about it, the face of a Scyth...and what eyes! What depth of vision!...And his brow, so large and wise...He seemed to me a colossal mystery, and for that reason I loved him. Kanin, with a rag around his head, his head in patches made by himself and then worn out, appeared none the less as a man of dignity; he was like a saint.

== Description ==
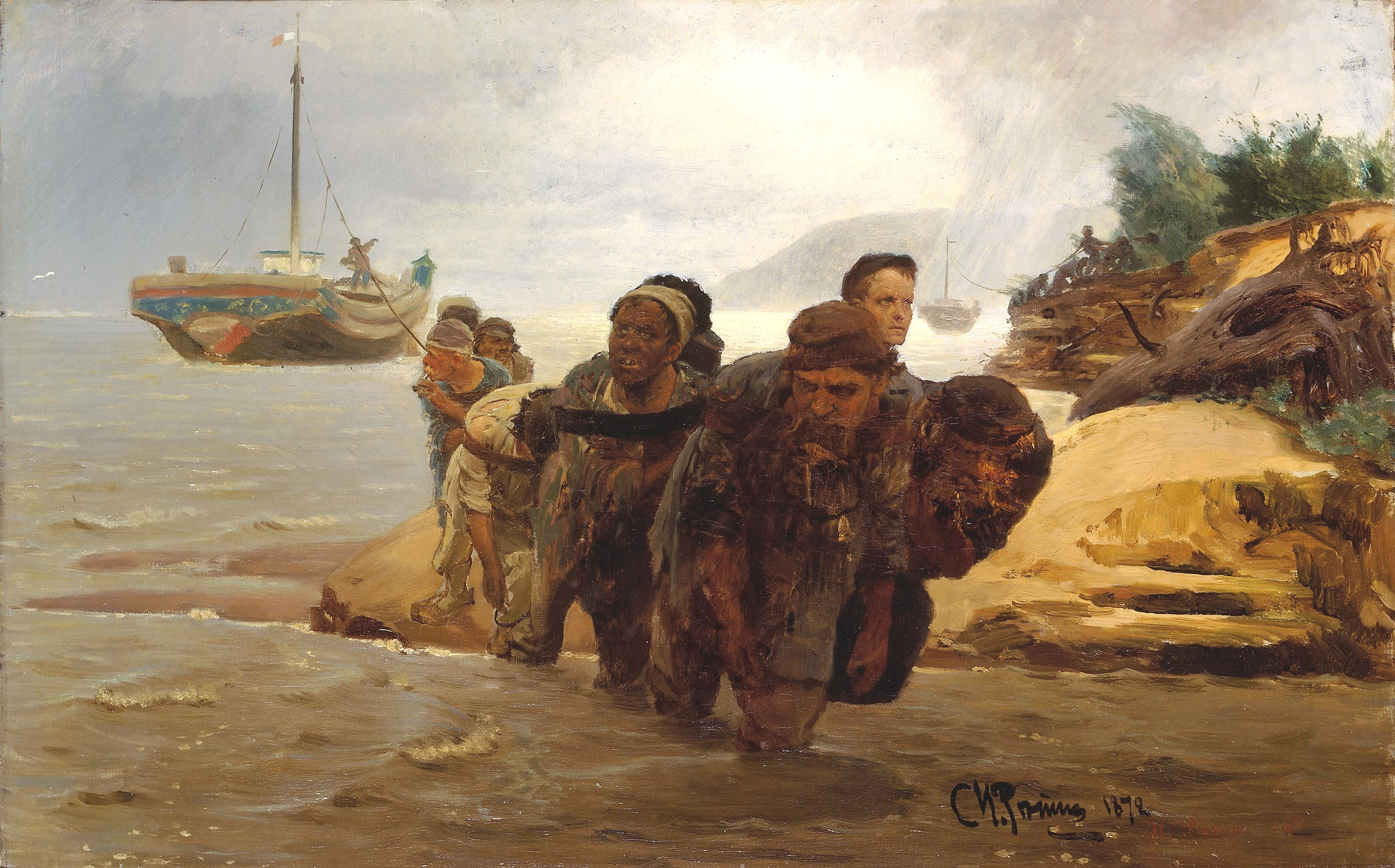
Barge Haulers Crossing a Ford, Ilya Repin, oil on canvas, 1872. 62 × 97 cm. The State Tretyakov Gallery, Moscow.

Barge Haulers on the Volga shows a row of eleven male burlaks dragging a barge on the Volga River that must be pulled upstream against the current. The men are dressed in rags and bound with leather harnesses. They are rendered as mostly stoical, although in obvious physical discomfort, with their bodies bowed in toil. The scene is rendered in a white, silvery light which has been described as "almost Venetian". In earlier studies, it was dominated by blue tones.

The men appear to be unsupervised and form the focus of the picture, with the barge relegated to a minor role at the rear of the frame. Further in the distance is a tiny steam-powered boat, perhaps a suggestion that the back-breaking labor of the barge haulers is no longer necessary in the industrial age. Also worthy of note is the inverted Russian flag flying from the main mast of the barge, adding to the sense of hostile unease. Repin echoes the stop-go rhythm of the labor in the undulating line of the workers' heads. In the preparatory studies, many of the figures were positioned differently; for example the second man was shown wearing a cap with his head bowed into his chest.

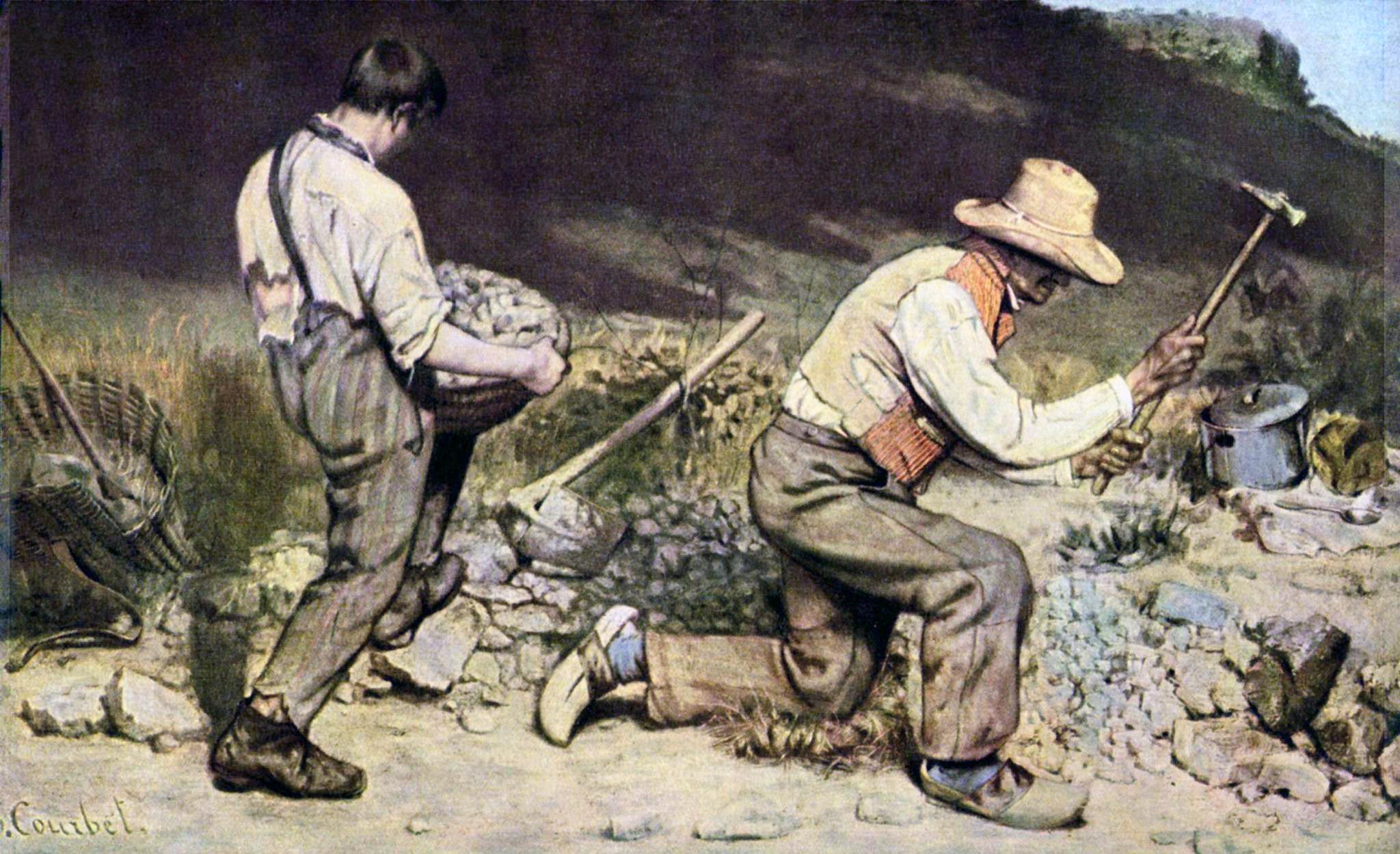
The Stone Breakers, Gustave Courbet, 1850. Destroyed

There is a general sense of mounting exhaustion and despair moving from left to right among the group; the last hauler seems oblivious to his surroundings and drifts from the line out towards the viewer. The exception is a fair-haired boy in the center of the group. Set brightly against the uniform muted tones of his companions, he stands straighter; his head is raised looking into the distance, while he pulls against his straps as if determined to free himself from his task.

Repin grew up in Chuguev, in the Kharkov Governorate (now Ukraine) and was aware of the poverty and hardship of most rural life at that time. He spent two years traveling, during which time he observed both the dachas of the rich and the toil of the common peasant. As such the painting can be considered a genre work, but treated on the heroic scale of history painting, as was often the case in 19th-century works, especially after A Burial At Ornans by Gustave Courbet (1850). Barge Haulers drew direct comparisons from critics with Millet's works and Courbet's The Stone Breakers (also 1850), which showed laborers at the side of a road.

The painting is a relentlessly physical description of the men; Repin was attracted by their strength and superhuman effort. According to critic Vladimir Stassov, "They are like a group of forest Hercules with their disheveled heads, their sun-tanned chests, and their motionlessly hanging, strong-veined hands. What glances from untamed eyes, what distended nostrils, what iron muscles!"

In his description of their heavy brows and the lined foreheads, Repin does not neglect their spiritual torment; although he does not concentrate too much on any single man's personal intimate emotions. Any sense of personal hardship is of secondary importance to the portrayal of effort and human dignity.

== Reception and legacy ==
Repin considered Barge Haulers to be his first professional painting and it is the work that defined him as a master documentarian of social inequality. When first exhibited, it received enthusiastic reviews for its unsentimental depiction of lower-class laborers, which stood in stark contrast to the romanticised, classical or propagandist nature of most contemporary Russian art. The painting paved the way for Repin to join the Peredvizhniki (the Wanderers or Itinerants), an anti-academic realist movement formed in 1870. The Peredvizhniki sought not only to break away from the academic school, but also to subvert the manner in which art was viewed. By depicting scenes from ordinary life and holding exhibitions in the provinces they aimed to enlighten and make art more accessible to the masses.

The painting was widely discussed for its break with the traditions of the academy. It earned Repin the respect of Vladimir Stasov, who believed that art shaped people's outlook and the way in which they viewed their own political situation. Stasov encouraged Repin to focus on Russian subject matter and after the release of Barge Haulers, he became a close friend of the artist and enthusiastically praised each of Repin's paintings thereafter. Stasov wrote of the painting, "with a daring that is unprecedented amongst us [Repin] has abandoned all former conceptions of the ideal in art, and has plunged head first into the very heart of the people's life, the people's interests, and the people's oppressive reality ... no one in Russia has ever dared take on such a subject". In return, Repin said that Stasov's "cry all over Russia was the first and the mightiest and it was heard in Russia by everyone capable of hearing. It was thanks to him that my glory spread."

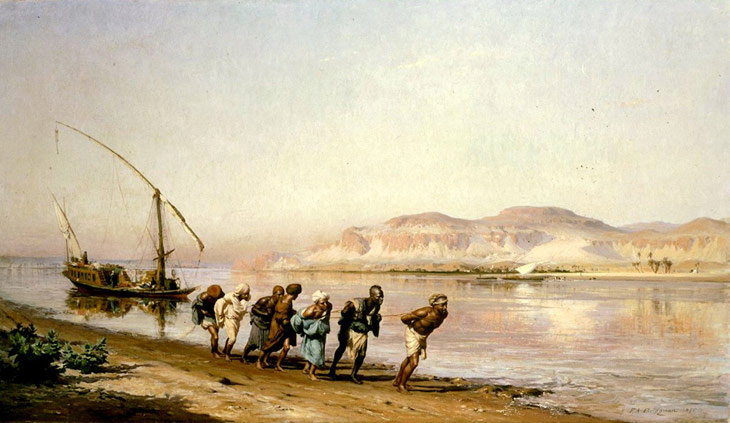
Frederick Arthur Bridgman, Towing on the Nile, 1875.

Fyodor Dostoyevsky read about Repin's painting in the newspapers and assumed it was another Russian work whose artistry was secondary to its social message. He wrote, "Even the subject itself is terrible ... I came expecting to see these barge-haulers all lined up in uniforms with the usual labels stuck to their foreheads ... To my delight, all my fears turned out to be in vain ... Not a single one of them shouts from the painting to the viewer, 'Look how unfortunate I am and how indebted you are to the people!'" To Dostoyevsky, Repin had avoided a common fault of contemporary Russian art, and in doing so had heightened the work's impact. He concluded, "[I saw] barge haulers, real barge haulers, and nothing more ... you can't help but think you are indebted, truly indebted, to the people." Such a feeling of an "unpaid debt" owed by the higher society to the peasantry was a common idea of the Narodniks. Today the painting is regarded as seminal in the formation of Russian realism.

The painting has been criticised both for still bearing hallmarks of academic drawing and for having an overall yellowish tone. Although it won a prize at the Society for the Advancement of the Arts in 1872, Repin continued to rework the canvas until 1873 when it was exhibited at the Academy of Arts in St. Petersburg.

The painting has been widely parodied, and it is often used as the basis for satirical political cartoons in Russia and elsewhere. A Finnish political cartoon by Kari Suomalainen created an international hubbub in 1958 for showing Nikita Khrushchev on a barge pulled by Eastern Bloc countries shouting "Imperialists!" to the US and UK on the shore.

According to the art critic Elia Kabanov, Repin's painting influenced American orientalist painter Frederick Arthur Bridgman to produce his Towing on the Nile in 1875.

== Provenance ==
Despite its social realism, Barge Haulers was bought by Grand Duke Vladimir Alexandrovich, the Tsar's second son. It was lent for exhibition at the 1873 International Exhibition in Vienna, where it won a bronze medal. It was exhibited outside Russia again in 1878, when it was again widely praised by critics for marking a watershed in Russian art. After the Russian Revolution the grand duke's art collection was nationalized and transferred from Vladimir Palace to the Russian Museum.

== Preparatory sketches ==
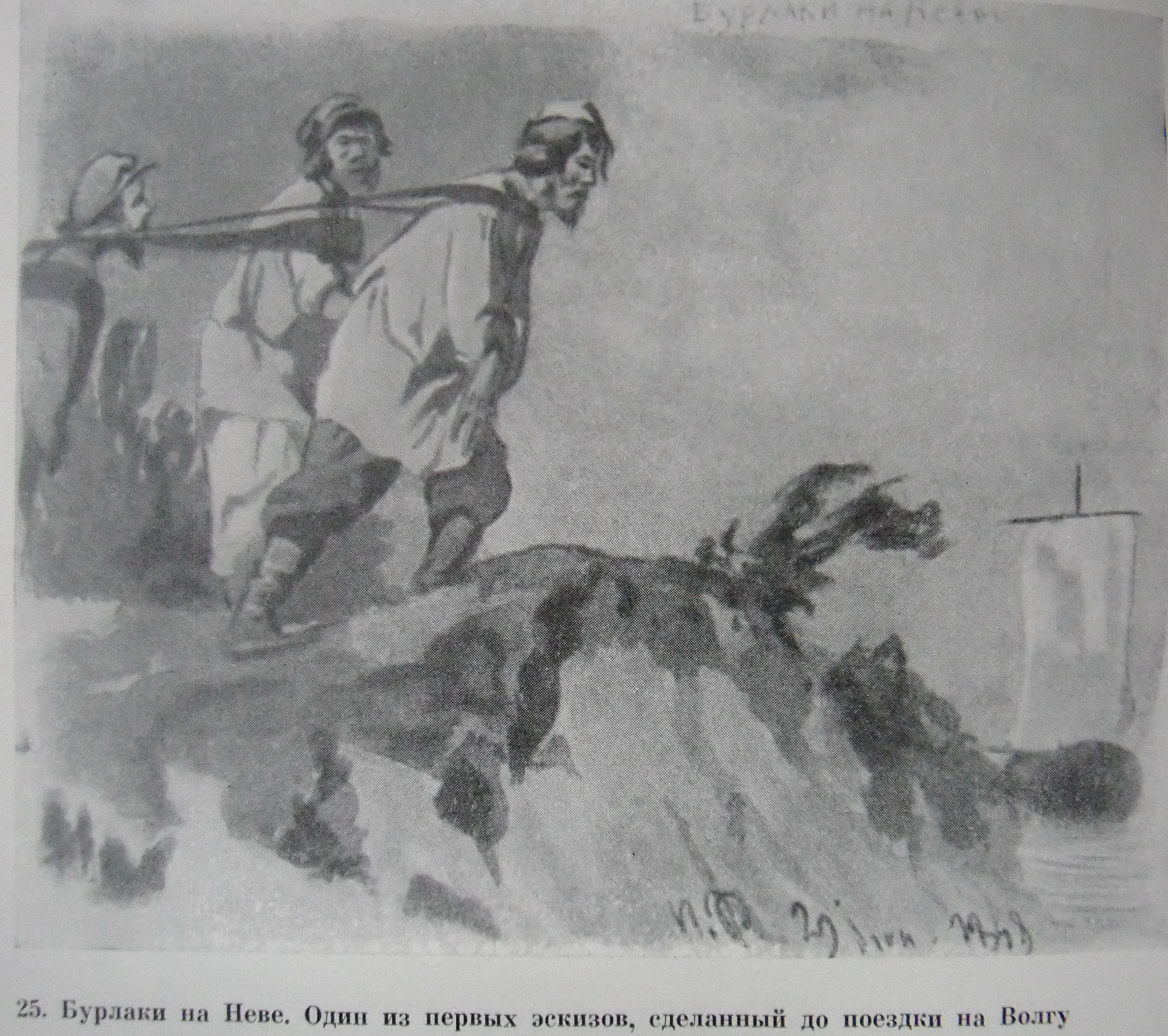
Бурлаки на Неве. Один из первых эскизов.
("Burlaki on the Neva. One of the first sketches.")

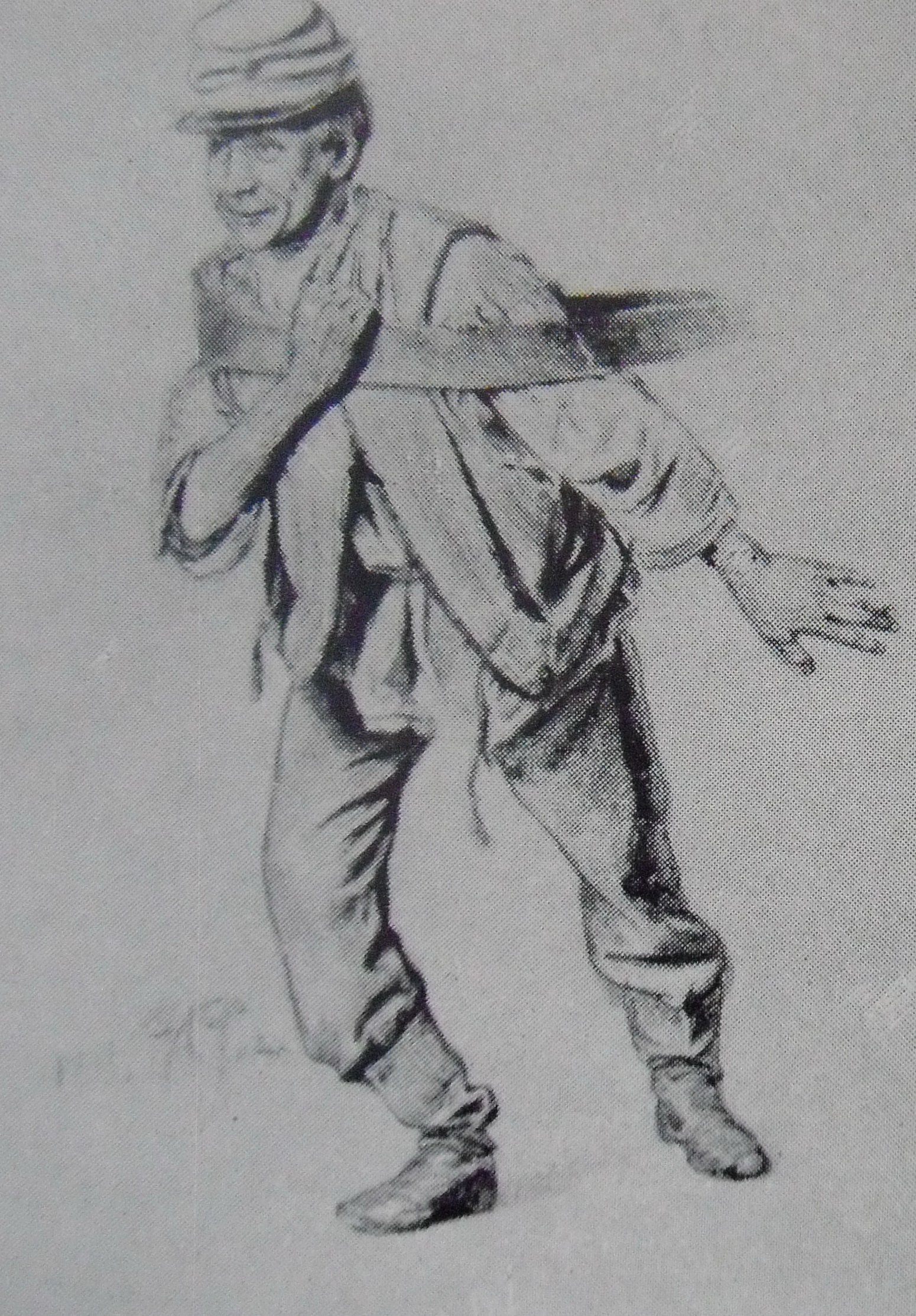
Бурлак («Солдат»)
("Burlak ('Soldier')")

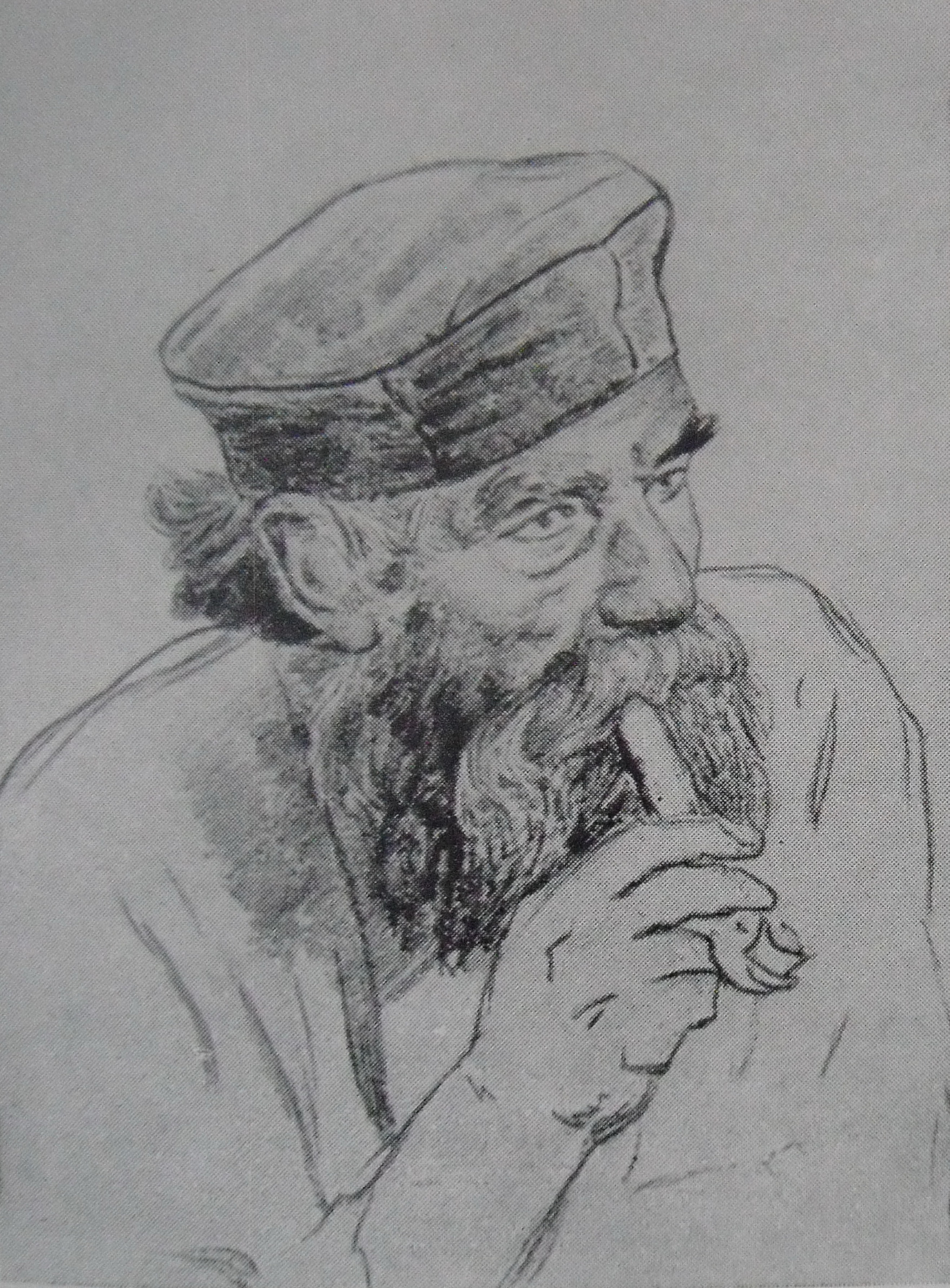
«Как за хлеб, так за брань»
("As for bread, so for swearing")

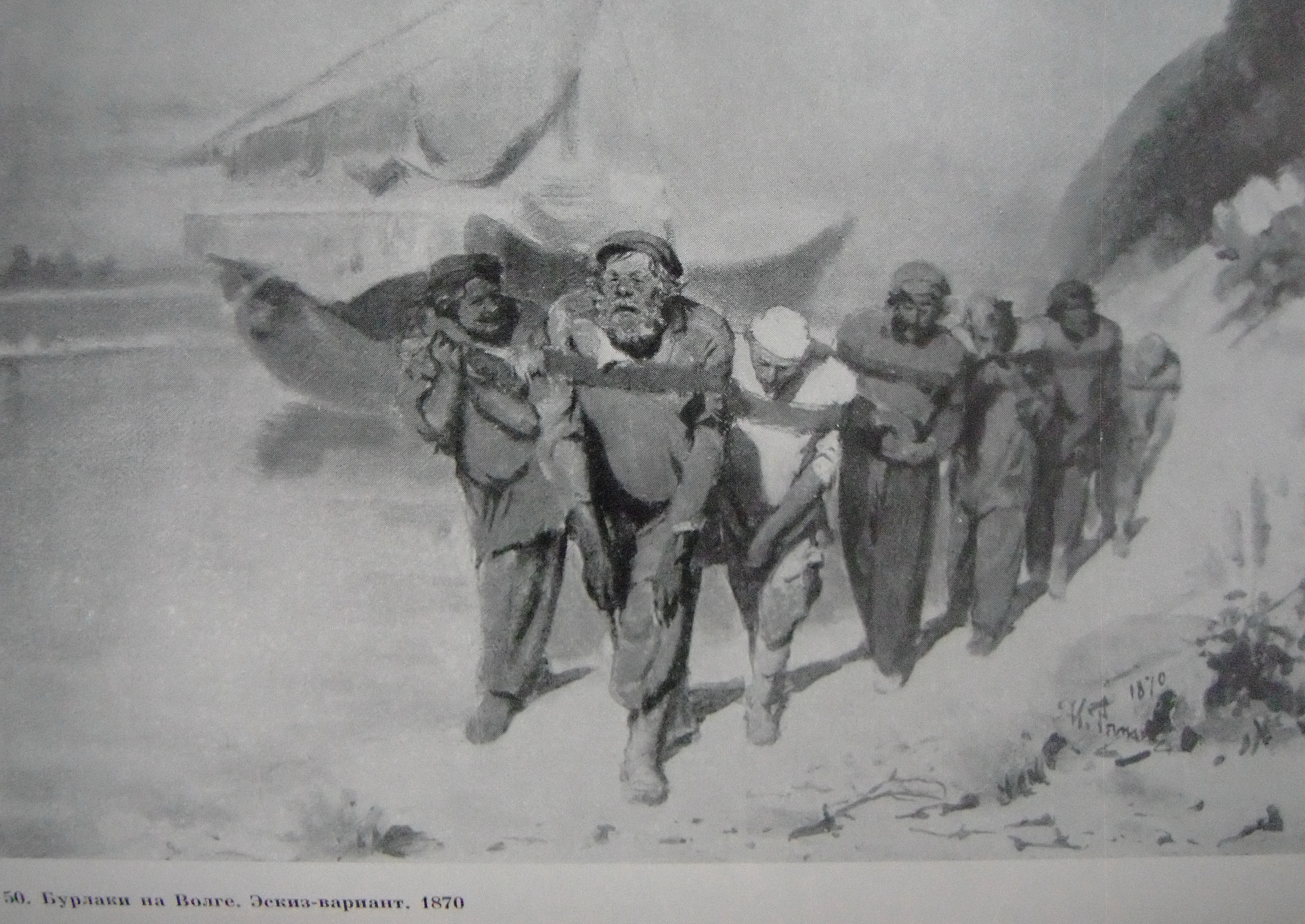
Бурлаки на Волге. Эскиз-вариант.
("Burlaki on the Volga. Variant sketch.")

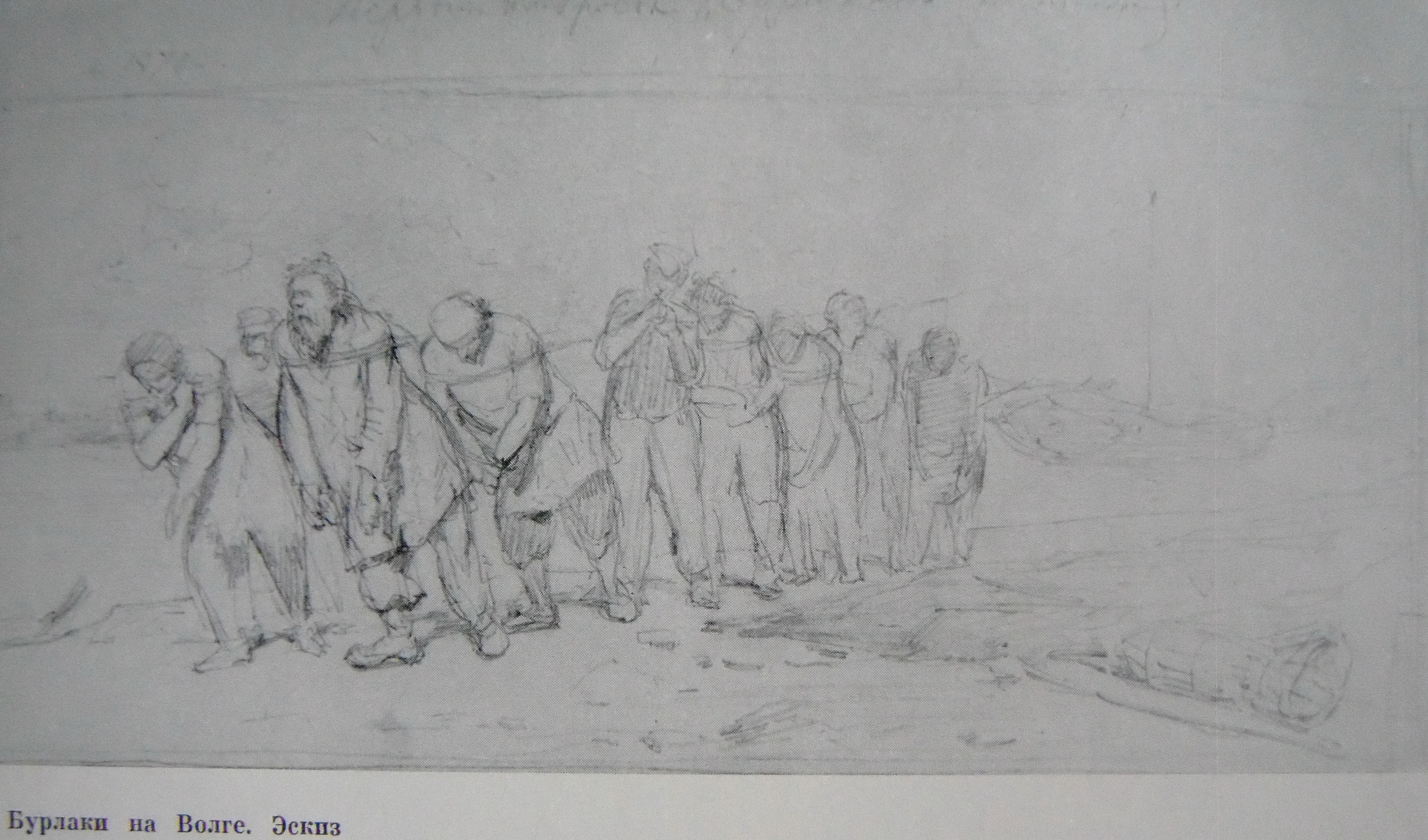
Бурлаки на Волге. Эскиз.
("Burlaki on the Volga. Sketch.")

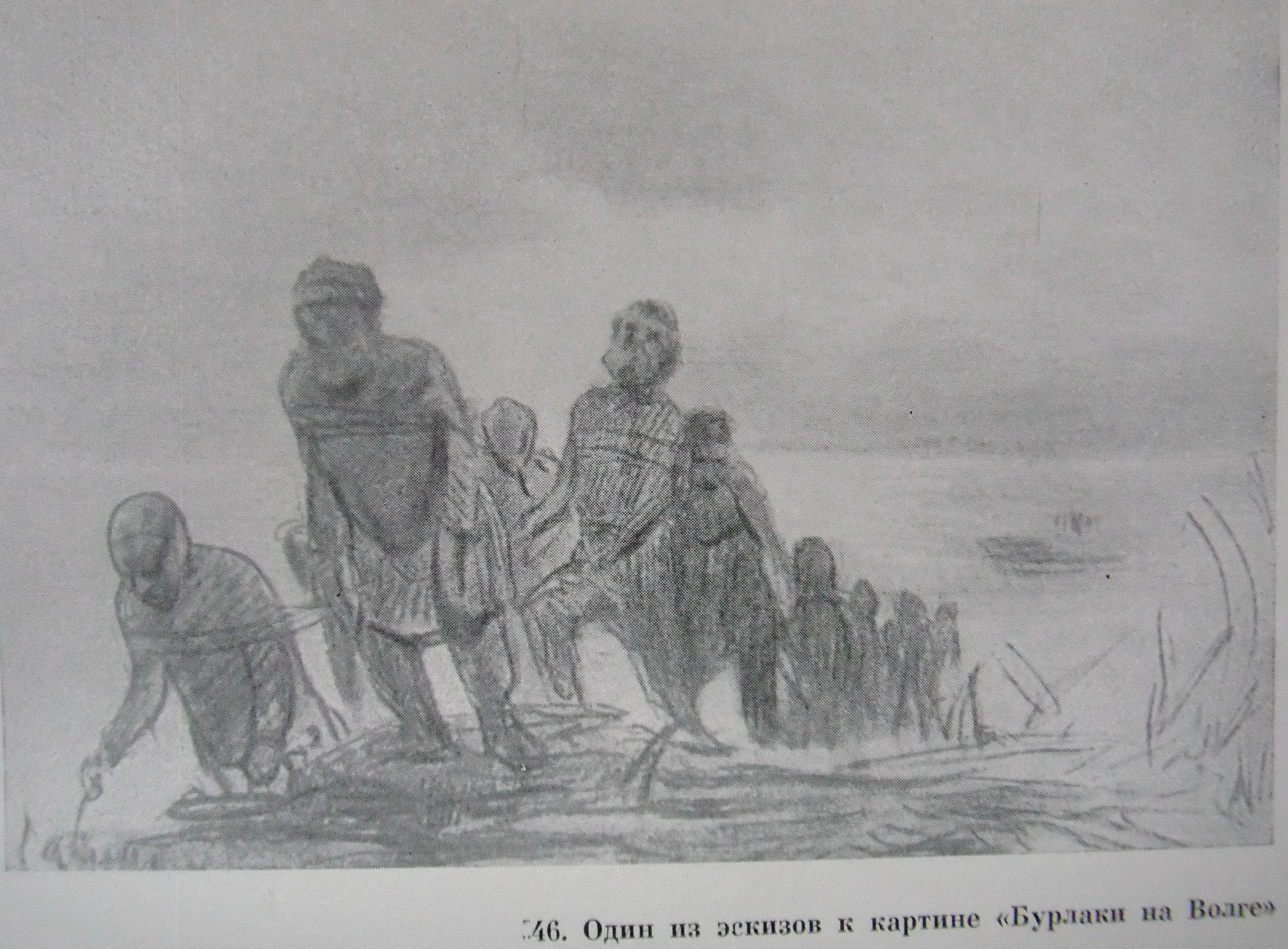
Один из эскизов к «Бурлакам»
("One of the sketches for 'Burlaki'")
