= Burlak =

Imperial Russian river boat pulling profession

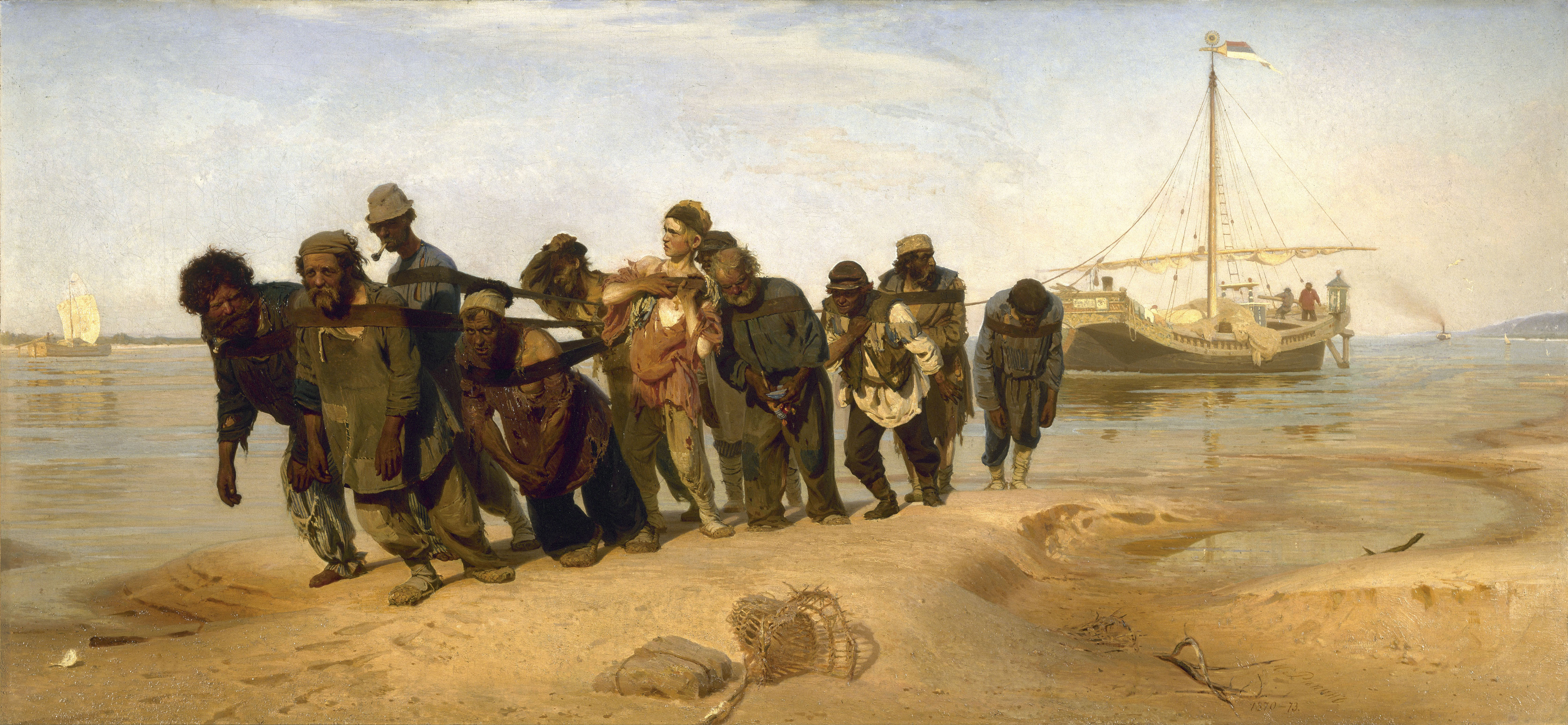
Burlaks on the Volga (painting by Ilya Repin, 1870–73)

"Ei, ukhnem!" by Feodor Chaliapin
1902 Song of the Volga Boatmen record by Feodor Chaliapin

A burlak (Russian: бурла́к, IPA: [bʊrˈlak]) was a river boat or barge puller in the Russian Empire. It was a seasonal occupation.

Burlaks as an occupation appeared in Russia at the end of 16th century and beginning of the 17th century. With the expansion of freight-hauling, the number of burlaks increased. With the proliferation of steamships, the demand in burlaks diminished and they basically disappeared by the end of the 19th century.

== Overview ==
There were seasonal burlaks, who worked from spring to autumn, and temporary burlaks, who worked occasionally. Burlaks did not work in winter, when most Russian rivers were frozen over.

The main areas of the burlaks' trade in the Russian Empire were the Volga river, from Moscow to Astrakhan, the White Sea route (Belomor'e), from Moscow to Arkhangelsk, and the Dnieper river, in Ukraine.

Most burlaks were landless or poor peasants from Simbirsk, Saratov, Samara, Yaroslavl, Kostroma, Vladimir, Ryazan, Tambov and Penza areas.

Burlaks joined up in an artel (typically from four to six, sometimes ten to forty, and occasionally up 150 people) mainly in winter, despite that at this time clients paid the lowest price, because in winter burlaks were often otherwise unemployed. The final payments were in autumn, after finishing work.

With the coming of the Industrial Revolution, the number of burlaks declined: at the beginning of the nineteenth century about 600,000 burlaks worked on the Volga and Oka rivers; in the middle of nineteenth century, 150,000, and by the beginning of the twentieth burlaks had all but disappeared.

== Burlaks in culture ==
The burlak has been a subject of Russian songs and artwork (Burlaks on the Volga by Ilya Repin).

Dubinushka is a well-known traditional work song of burlaks, popularized by Feodor Chaliapin.

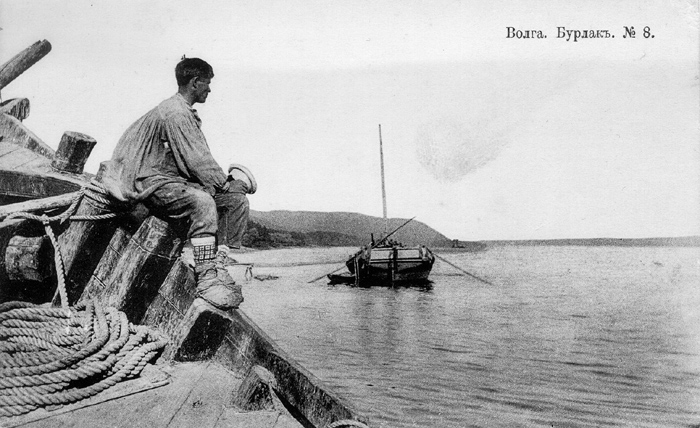
Burlak (1900s)

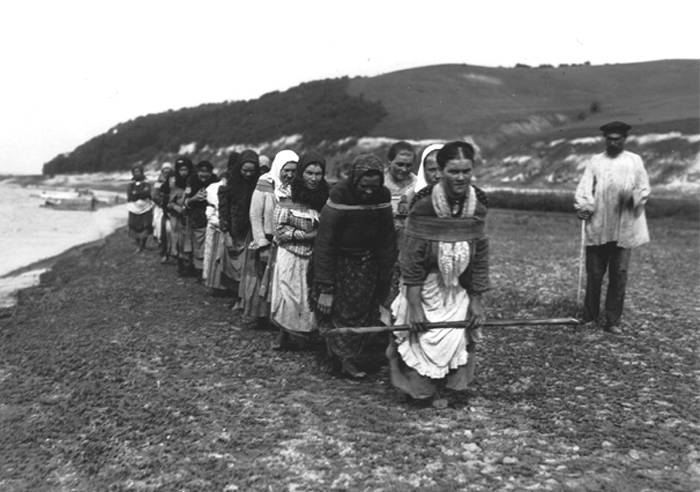
Burlak women on the Volga River (1900s)

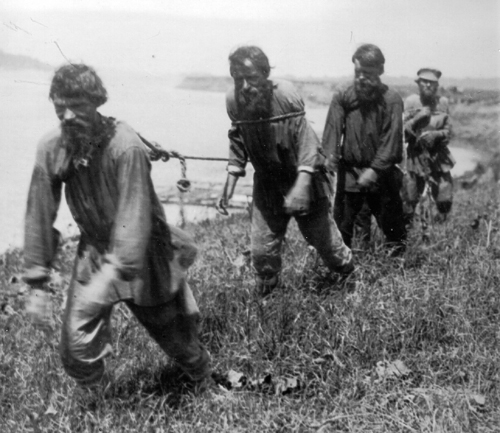
Burlaks on the Volga River (1900s)

== See also ==
- Towpath
- List of obsolete occupations

== Sources ==
- "Бурлак" . Brockhaus and Efron Encyclopedic Dictionary (in Russian). 1906.
