= Glossary of Russian carriages =

There are a number of horse-drawn vehicles peculiar to Russia. In regions with harsh winters, carriage bodies were sometimes built to be interchangeable—able to set upon sled runners in snow or fitted to wheeled undercarriages for the warmer seasons. Oxen, dogs and reindeer may also be used by indigenous peoples of Russia.

== Horse-drawn carriages ==
- Dolgusha, dolgushka (долгуша, долгушка), an obsolete generic term for a carriage whose body was mounted on a long base (from the word dolgiy, 'long'). It could be applied to long drogi, lineyka, or tarantass, as well as to a long cargo cart, e.g., for lumber. (Note: There are a number of Russian villages and rivers named Dolgusha.)
- Drogi (дроги), a primitive long cart without a body; basically only front and back axles connected by one or two beams called droga
- Droshky — a four-wheeled open carriage where passengers straddle the seat
- Ekipazh (Экипаж; from French: équipage), a generic term for various kinds of private horse-drawn vehicles.
- Fura (wikt:фура), large cargo cart, esp. for military use. In modern Russian it colloquially refers to semi-trailer truck.
- Furmanka, small fura or small britzka, from German Fuhrmann, "carter"
- Kibitka, carriage with a cloth cover stretched over wooden bows. It may be installed on wheels or sleigh runners.
- Kolymaga — a 16th–17th century precursor of the coach
- Lineyka, old horse-drawn topless passenger carriage with a longitudinal partition, in which passengers sit in two lines with their backs to each other, sideways to the direction of travel.
- Prolyotka or proletka, Russian: пролётка, a light, open, four-wheeled, two-passenger (plus a cabbie) carriage, mostly single-horse. The term derives from the word "пролетать", literally 'to fly through', meaning to move swiftly. The word is a colloquial contraction for "prolyotnye droshky" (пролетные дрожки), a drozhky used by Russian city cabbies, named so, because many cabbies were notorious for fast, daring ride and were called "лихач" (likhach), "daredevil".
- Rydvan (рыдван; archaic), a large, comfortable coach for long-distance travel, drawn by several horses. In modern times the word is used ironically for large, clumsy vehicles. From Polish "rydwan", eventually from German "Reitwagen", both meaning for 'chariot'.
- Tagarka, Ural fishermen's carriage; basically a regular carriage with waterproof bast cabin
- Tarantass — a long four-wheeled carriage with no springs or seats
- Telega — a wagon

== Horse-drawn sleds ==
- Russian sleds
  - Drovni, a peasant cargo sled of extremely simple construction
  - Kaptan, winter carriage in medieval Russia for aristocracy and noblemen
  - Kibitka may be mounted both on sleds and on wheels.
  - Rozvalni, a simple, wide sledge with side poles that flare outward. The name comes from the Russian root razval‑ ("to spread out, sprawl"), referring both to the outward‑spreading poles and the roomy, open design of the sledge.
  - Troika — sleigh driven by three horses abreast
  - Vozok — an enclosed winter sleigh; a large carriage body mounted on runners.

== Carriages of indigenous peoples of Russian Empire and modern Russia ==
- Arba, in Central Asia, Caucasus, Ukraine, Southern Russia; drawn by horses or oxen
- Britzka; originating in Poland, it was common in Russian Empire
- Tachanka, Ukraine, Southern Russia

== Drawn by other animals ==
- ru:Нарты; most commonly it is translated as dog sled; but narty may also be pulled by reindeer (Russian North, Siberia and Far East)
- ru:Керёжа, fi:Ahkio, traditional Finnish reindeer-pulled narrow sled (Kola Peninsula)

== See also ==
- Horses in Russia
