= Kibitka =

Russian covered carriage

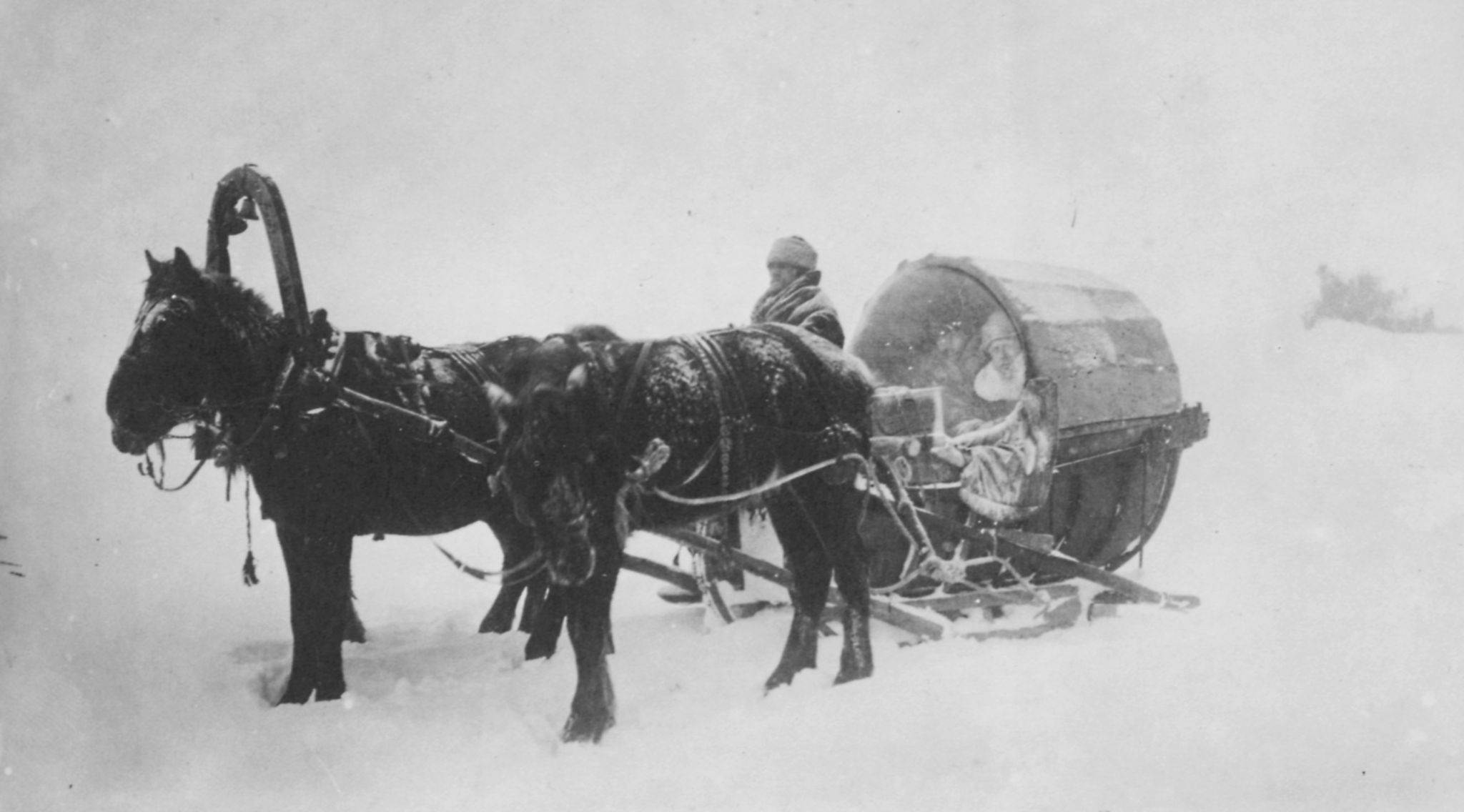
A kibitka on sleigh runners

A kibitka (Russian: кибитка, from the Arabic kubbat, 'dome') is a Russian type of carriage with a cloth cover stretched over wooden bows. It is roughly made, and is held together with ropes, often making a sling seat upon which a hay-filled cushion might be placed. It may be installed on wheels or sleigh runners. It could be used as a posting wagon.

In Russian literature and folklore, the term kibitka is used in reference to Gypsy wagons.

The use in the Russian Empire of kibitki to transport disgraced noblemen into exile, and convicts to katorga forced labor inspired the German-language term Kibitkenjustiz and the equivalent English-language concept of "kibitka justice".

Previously, in the Russian Empire the term was used in reference to a yurt of steppe nomads. In these times there was a "kibitka tax" levied upon the steppe nomads for any type of nomadic temporary and semi-temporary dwellings.

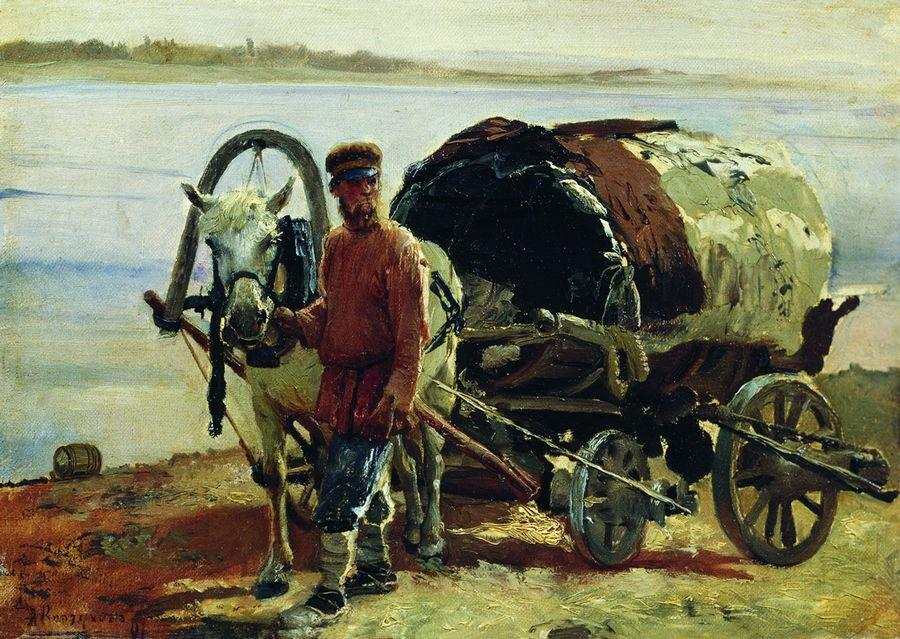
Painting of a kibitka on wheels by Alexei Korzukhin, 1889

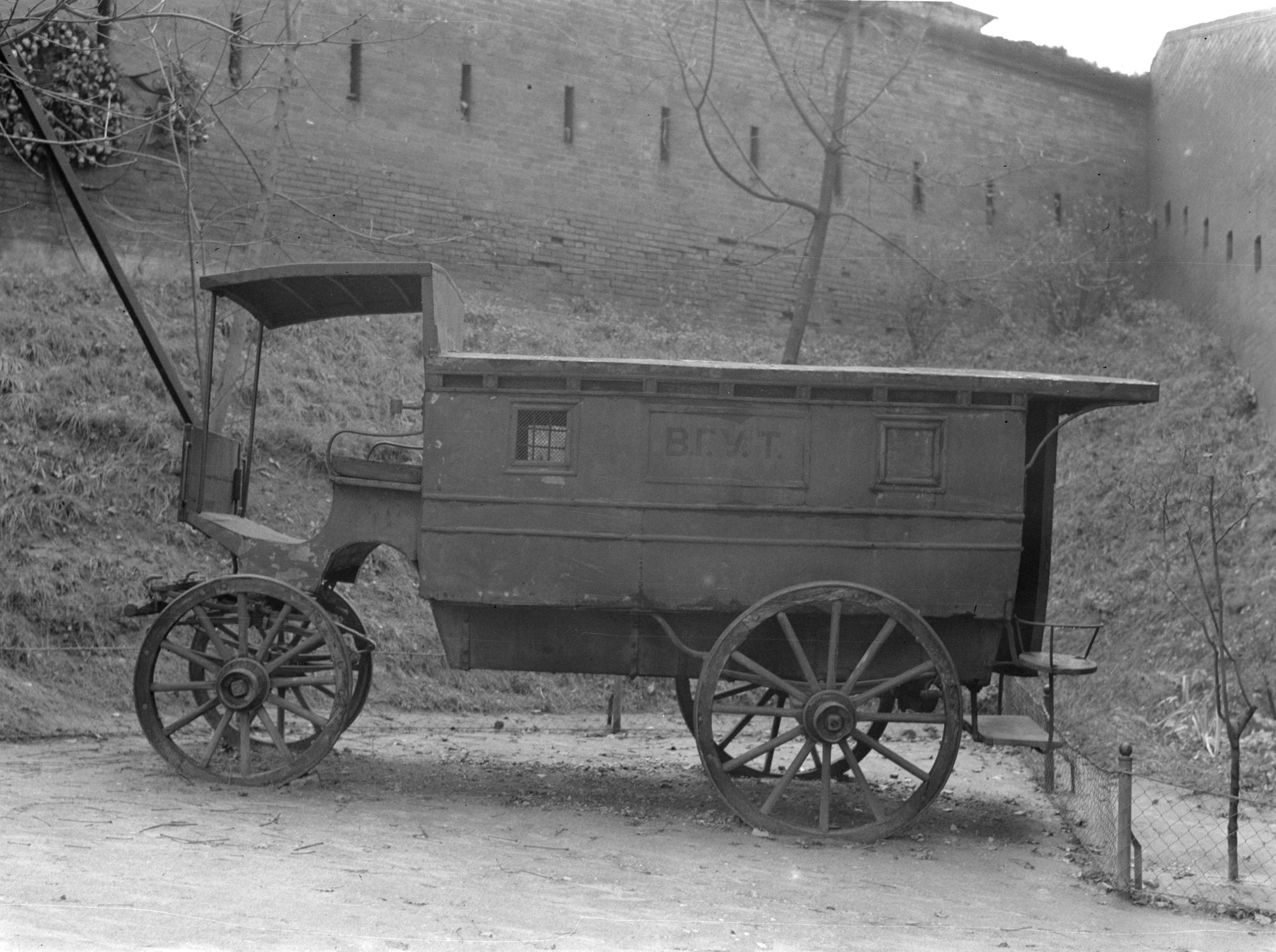
19th-century Russian Imperial prison van known in Polish as kibitka

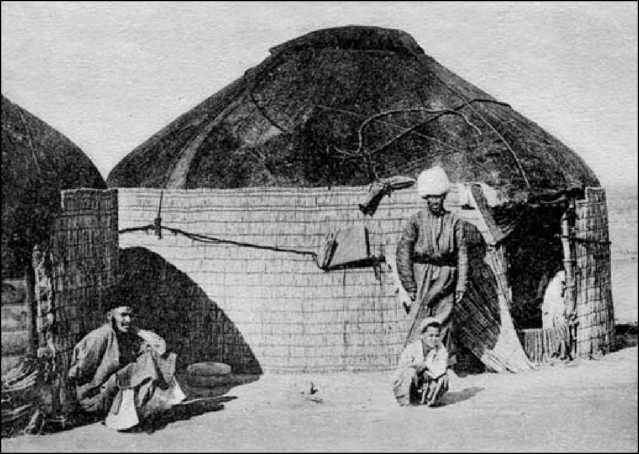
A yurt of Teke people called "kibitka" in the Russian Empire

== See also ==
- Glossary of Russian carriages
- Horses in Russia
