= Tarantass =

Horse-drawn vehicle of Russia

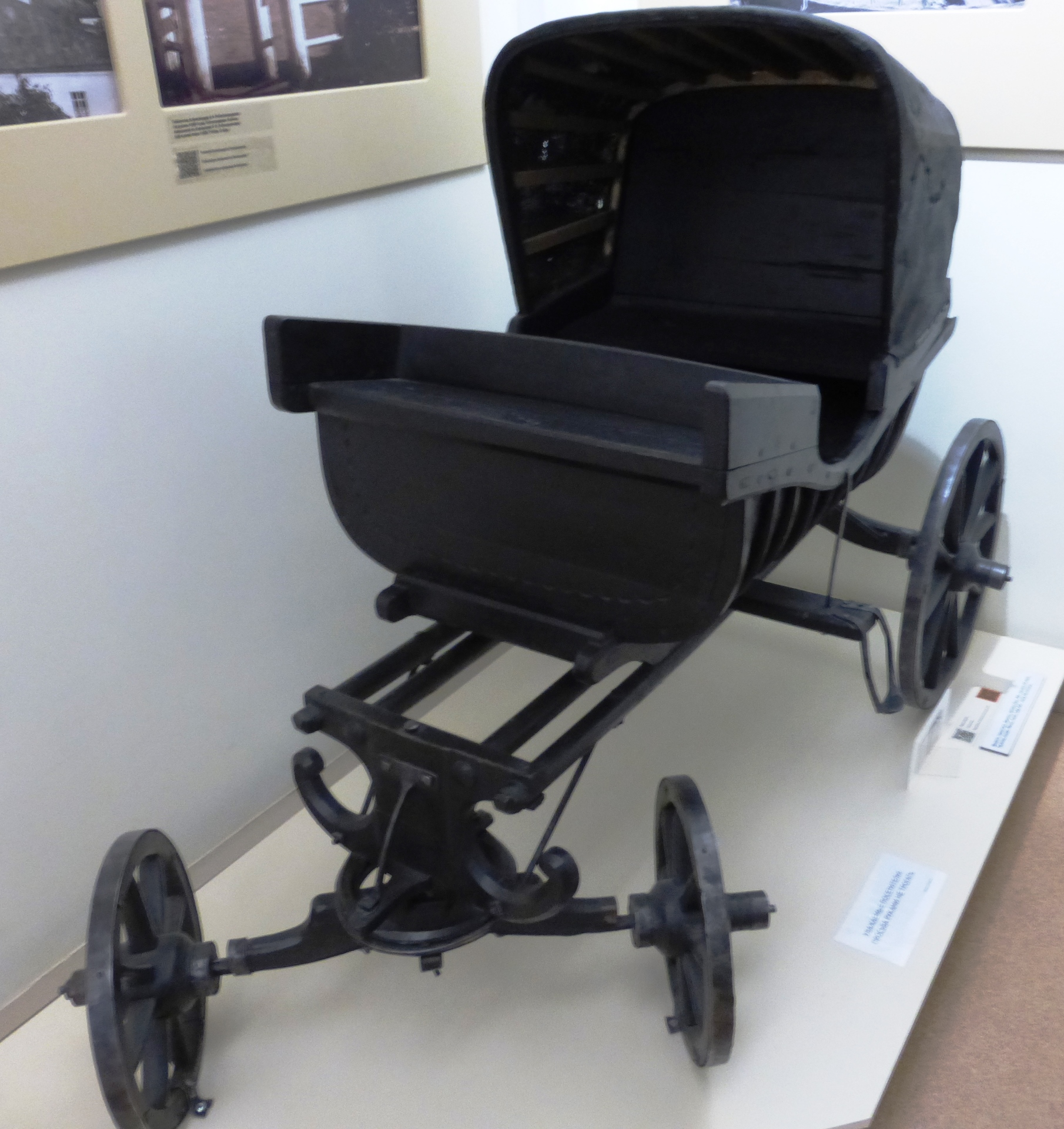
Tarantass displayed at National Museum of Karelia

The tarantass is a four-wheeled horse-drawn vehicle on a long longitudinal frame, reducing road jolting on long-distance travel. It was widely used in Russia in the first half of the 19th century. It generally carried four passengers.

== Design ==
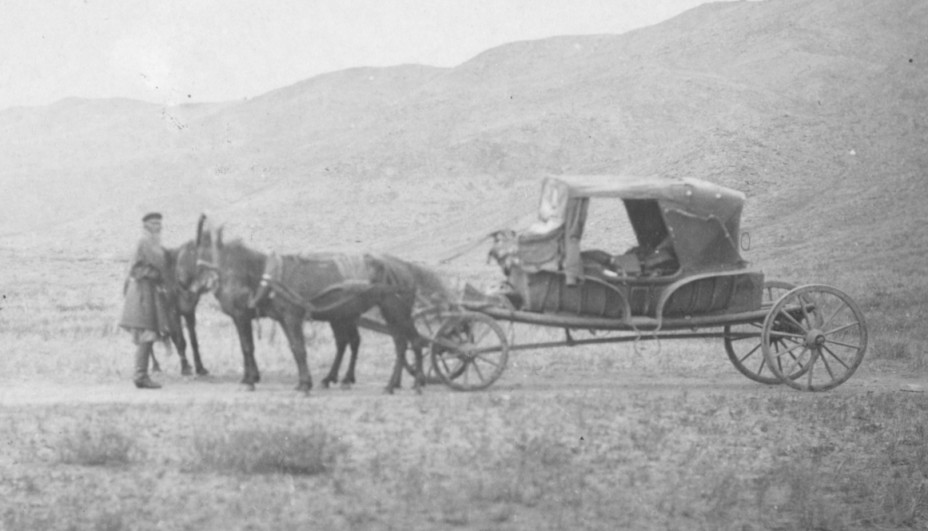
A tarantass in Siberia, c.1885

Vladimir Sollogub gave an ironic description of a tarantass. His and other descriptions may be summarized as follows. The tarantass has been described as two long poles serving as parallel axles supporting a large basket forming a cup or bowl. It is not suspended on springs, and generally has no benches. The vehicle is accessed by an external ladder. The interior is generally covered by straw, changed at intervals for cleanliness, upon which the passengers rest. A similar description was given in The Illustrated London News.

The types of a tarantass manufactured in early Soviet Union varied. In particular, they could have no springs, or two or four springs.

== Historical context ==
The origin of the word is not known: Max Vasmer's Etymological Dictionary of the Russian Language lists a number of variants from regional dialects to the ancient Indo-European roots with the mark "doubtful".

In 1840, Russian author Vladimir Sollogub published an ironical novelette "Tarantass", written in the form of a travelogue.

In 1893, medical doctor and Christian missionary Charles Wenyon travelled from Vladivostok to the Urals, to the marker on the boundary of Europe and Asia by a combination of tarantass and river steamer. He claimed to be one of the last Englishmen to take this route "in the old fashioned way", by steamboat (up the Ussuri and Amur), tarantas (across the expanses of Siberia), and rail (at the last stretch along the newly-constructed railroad branch from Europe, across the Ural River into Siberia). His journey is described in Four Thousand Miles Across Siberia: On the Great Post-Road. He described tarantas as "a sort of means of transport which combines the disadvantages of all the others".

== See also ==
- Glossary of Russian horse-drawn vehicles
- Horses in Russia
