= Dolgusha =

Dolgusha (Долгуша) may refer to the following places in Russia:

== Populated places ==
- Dolgusha, Kursk Oblast
- Dolgusha, Lipetsk Oblast
- Dolgusha, Moscow Oblast
- Dolgusha, Nizhny Novgorod Oblast
- Dolgusha, Pskovast
- Dolgusha, Vologda Oblast

== Rivers ==
- Dolgusha (Shosha tributary)
- Dolgusha (Yashchera tributary)

== See also ==
- Dolgusha (carriage)
