= To War (painting) =

1888 painting by Konstantin Savitsky

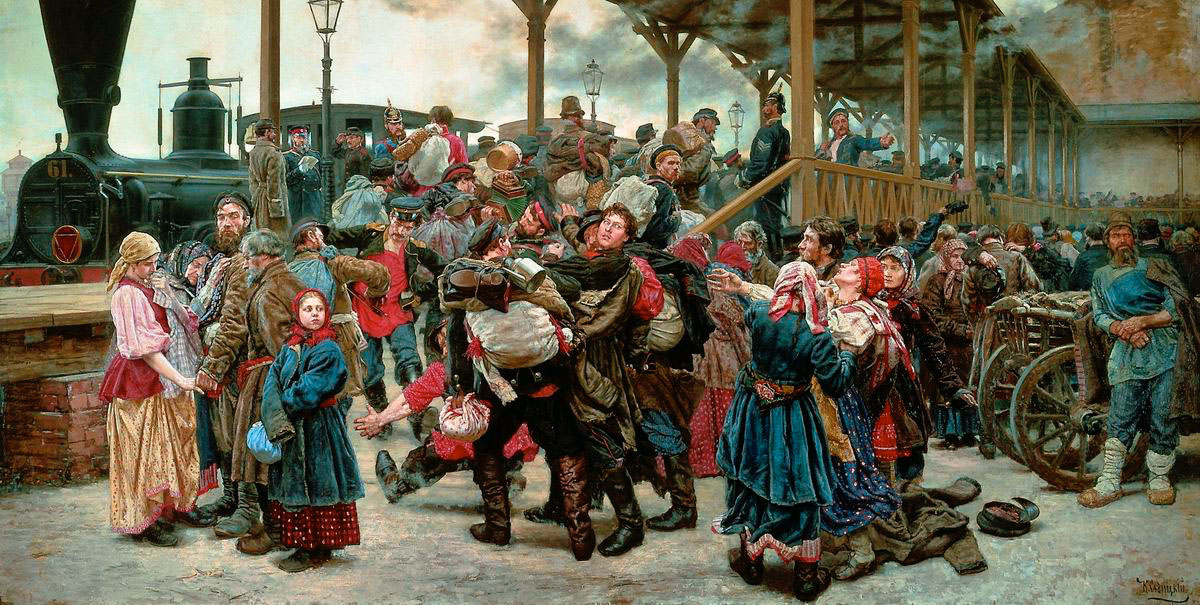
- Artist: Konstantin Savitsky
- Year: 1888
- Medium: Oil on canvas
- Dimensions: 207.5 cm × 303.5 cm (81.7 in × 119.5 in)
- Location: Russian Museum, Saint Petersburg

To War is a painting by the Russian artist Konstantin Savitsky (1844–1905), completed in 1888. It belongs to the State Russian Museum in St. Petersburg (Inventory No. Zh-4228). The dimensions of the canvas are 207.5 × 303.5 cm. Alternative titles are also used, including Sending Recruits Off to War and Seeing Off to War. The narrative revolves around the scene of soldiers going off to war, parting with their loved ones. It takes place during the Russo-Turkish War of 1877-1878.

Savitsky commenced work on the painting, entitled To War, during the second half of the 1870s. The initial version of the painting, completed in 1880, was exhibited at the 8th exhibition of the Society for Travelling Art Exhibitions (Peredvizhniki). The appearance of Savitsky's painting at the exhibition was met with a number of critical comments - in particular, that it was overloaded with too many figures. The painting received positive reviews as well. For instance, the art critic Vladimir Stasov acknowledged that, "despite many shortcomings, there was a lot of truth and feeling in the painting". Nevertheless, in response to the considerable criticism he had received, Savitsky decided to repaint the piece. As it turned out many years later, the initial iteration of the work was cut into pieces by the artist.

The second and final iteration of the painting was presented at the 16th exhibition of the Society for Travelling Art Exhibitions (Peredvizhniki), which opened on 28 February (11 March) 1888 in St. Petersburg. This time the painting was received more favourably: in particular, the artist Ilya Repin remarked that "Savitsky's painting 'To War' came out very well", and the critic Vladimir Stasov wrote that it was "an important page in the history of Russian art". Later, the art historian Mikhail Sokolnikov noted that Savitsky's To War was "one of the most significant paintings in the Russian realist school of painting".

== History ==
=== Work on the first version of the painting and the 8th travelling exhibition ===
Konstantin Savitsky commenced work on the painting, entitled To War, during the latter half of the 1870s. The first ideas related to the future canvas appeared to the artist while he was abroad. In 1876, Savitsky, who was then in Paris, exhibited a preliminary sketch of the painting to the artist Alexey Bogolyubov, who subsequently presented it to Alexander Alexandrovich, the future Emperor Alexander III. In the process of creating the painting, Savitsky used many studies, which he painted in Dinaburg, Moscow, near St Petersburg, and elsewhere. In a letter to the artist Ivan Kramskoi, dated 22 December 1878, Savitsky wrote: "I would give a lot to have one of my friends talk to me about the painting I am writing now. There are so many questions that one goes over in one's head in silence, and there is no answer to them."

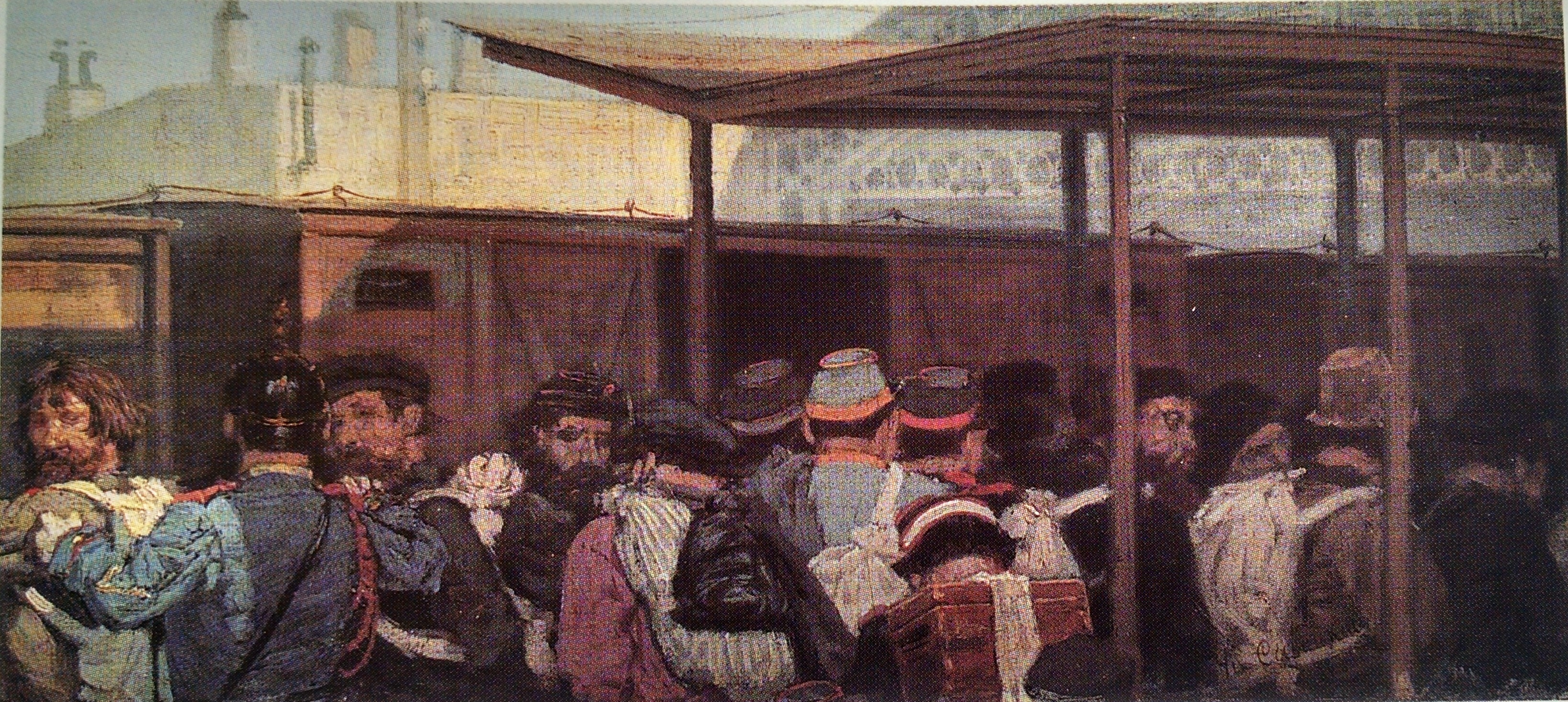
Soldiers crowding near railway carriages (fragment of the first version of the painting, 1880, State Tretyakov Gallery)

The initial iteration of the painting, completed in 1880, was showcased at the 8th exhibition of the Society for Travelling Art Exhibitions ("Peredvizhniki"), which commenced in St Petersburg on 6 (18) March 1880. The appearance of Savitsky's painting at the exhibition was met with a number of critical remarks. The reviewers, including authors of various periodicals, noted the painting's lack of compositional integrity, insufficient connection between groups and inaccuracies in the depiction of perspective.

The author of an article in the art and literary journal Vsemirnaya Illyustratsiya noted that the painting was "quite interesting and talented" in its details, but in some scenes "it is a motley crowd painted in two tiers", so that in general "there is not one whole picture". An observer for the Novoye Vremya newspaper wrote that Savitsky's work contained "abundant material for a dozen paintings", which was the reason that "the artist himself could not make sense of the mass of those leaving and seeing off". Nevertheless, paying tribute to the artist's skill, the author of an article in Novoye Vremya noted that "individual groups and faces are full of movement, life and expressiveness, and if you stop at them, you will read a whole drama in many faces and poses". In a review published in the newspaper Molva, the author posited that if you mentally try "to cut off as much as you like from any side of the painting or add as much to it in the same character - the content of the painting will neither win nor lose from this". The author of an article in the Peterburgskaya Gazeta noted that in Savitsky's painting "everything is interesting, but it is interesting in parts", and as a whole "there is no painting, or better to say, it is not concentrated, it is not connected together". Nevertheless, the critic from the Peterburgskaya Gazeta recognised that "the scenes and types are excellent, the expressions both in the movements and on the faces are vital, truthful and deeply felt". The art critic Vladimir Stasov observed that Savitsky's painting had an excessively grey background, although he conceded that, "despite many shortcomings, there was a lot of truth and feeling in this painting". The artist Ivan Kramskoy explained the shortcomings of the canvas, attributing them to the fact that shortly before the exhibition Savitsky had made substantial alterations to his painting, and "the alterations affected its pictorial side in the direction of deterioration".

=== Work on the second version of the painting and the 16th travelling exhibition ===
Apparently under the strong impression of this criticism, Savitsky decided to create a new version of To War. It is possible that Savitsky was also influenced by the works of other artists, particularly Vasily Surikov's multi-figure historical painting, The Morning of the Streltsy Execution, which was presented at the Peredvizhniki exhibition in 1881. Some of Savitsky's studies from this period are known to exist, including those depicting characters not included in the final version of the painting, such as Crying Soldier. In the eight years between the creation of the first and second versions of the painting, Savitsky also produced other works that contributed to the identification of the images of individual characters and, in general, to the completion of the final version of the painting. In the opinion of art historian Dmitri Sarabianov, the paintings Dark People (1882, Russian Museum), Horse Thief (1883) and Krutchnik (1884) are the most appropriate examples of such works.

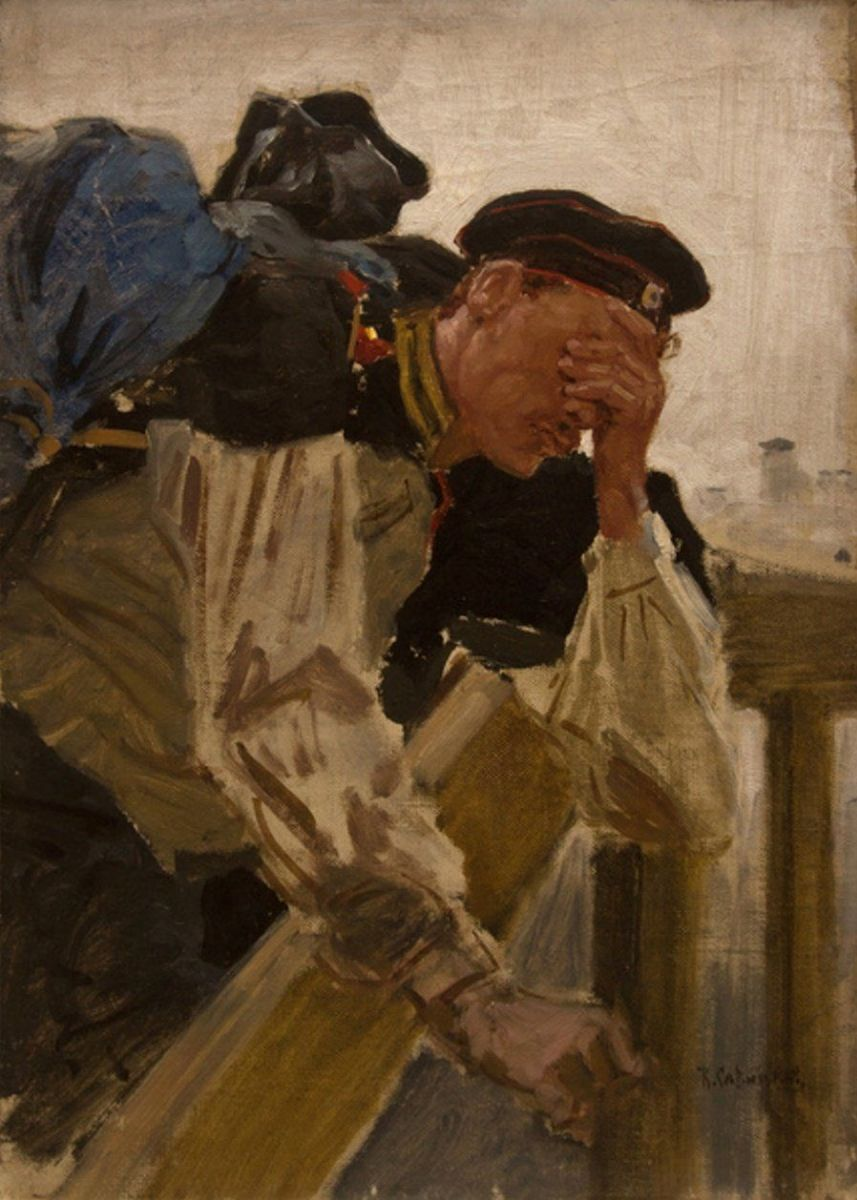
Crying Soldier (study, 1880s, Smolensk Art Gallery)

In his diaries, the State Secretary Alexander Polovtsov records that on 10 June 1886, at breakfast, the artist Alexei Bogolyubov informed him that the previous day, when presenting his painting The Opening of the Sea Canal to Alexander III, he had also shown the Emperor the new version of Savitsky's painting To War (perhaps one of the sketches). Grand Duke Vladimir Alexandrovich, who was present, was indignant: "What impertinence to present drunken soldiers to the sovereign!" It is possible that his response was influenced by the knowledge that Pyotr Iseev, the secretary of the Academy of Arts, was discontented. Iseev was not pleased with the fact that artists were communicating with Alexander III through other channels than himself. At the same time, the Empress Maria Feodorovna and the Grand Duchess Elizaveta Feodorovna tried to soften the "harshness of this stunt" of Vladimir Alexandrovich before Bogolyubov. Nevertheless, the final version of the painting was commissioned by Alexander III. This was likely due to the artist's removal or softening of several episodes present in the initial version of the painting, which depicted the disenfranchisement of soldiers and the abuse of authority.

In May 1887, Savitsky reported: "I am all, from the heels and to the very bush on my head, immersed in my painting. I only think how to see it as soon as possible completely established. And eat, and drink, and sleep all with the thought of it." Finally, on 23 February 1888, when the painting was finished, the artist said: "The painting is finished! It is so finished that I have decided to exhibit it; I have looked at it so closely that I could not decide myself. Tomorrow I am taking my brainchild to the exhibition." The second and final version of the painting was presented at the 16th exhibition of the Society for Travelling Art Exhibitions ("Peredvizhniki"), which opened on 28 February (11 March) 1888 in St Petersburg. This time, Savitsky's painting was met with a more favourable response from experts and critics. In a letter to the publisher Vladimir Chertkov dated 14 April 1888, the artist Ilya Repin highlighted two paintings presented at the exhibition: "A good thing was here at the exhibition - Yaroshenko 'Everywhere Life'. Perhaps they have already sent it to you. And Savitsky's painting 'To War' came out very well, you should have and show both these paintings. It would not be a bad idea to publish them for the people."

Despite the favourable reviews that the painting To War received at the 16th travelling exhibition, Savitsky continued working on it, thereby postponing its transfer to the customer. In September 1888 he wrote to the painter Alexander Kiselyov: "...do you know that I, miserable, to this day am still fiddling with my big child? Not only have [I] not yet handed [it] over, but I write and write to the [point of] stupor. Had the misfortune to paint a small repetition for the province, painted outside, it came out better, and I saw the light, now I am struggling out of the darkness. It does not come easily to me."

=== After creation ===
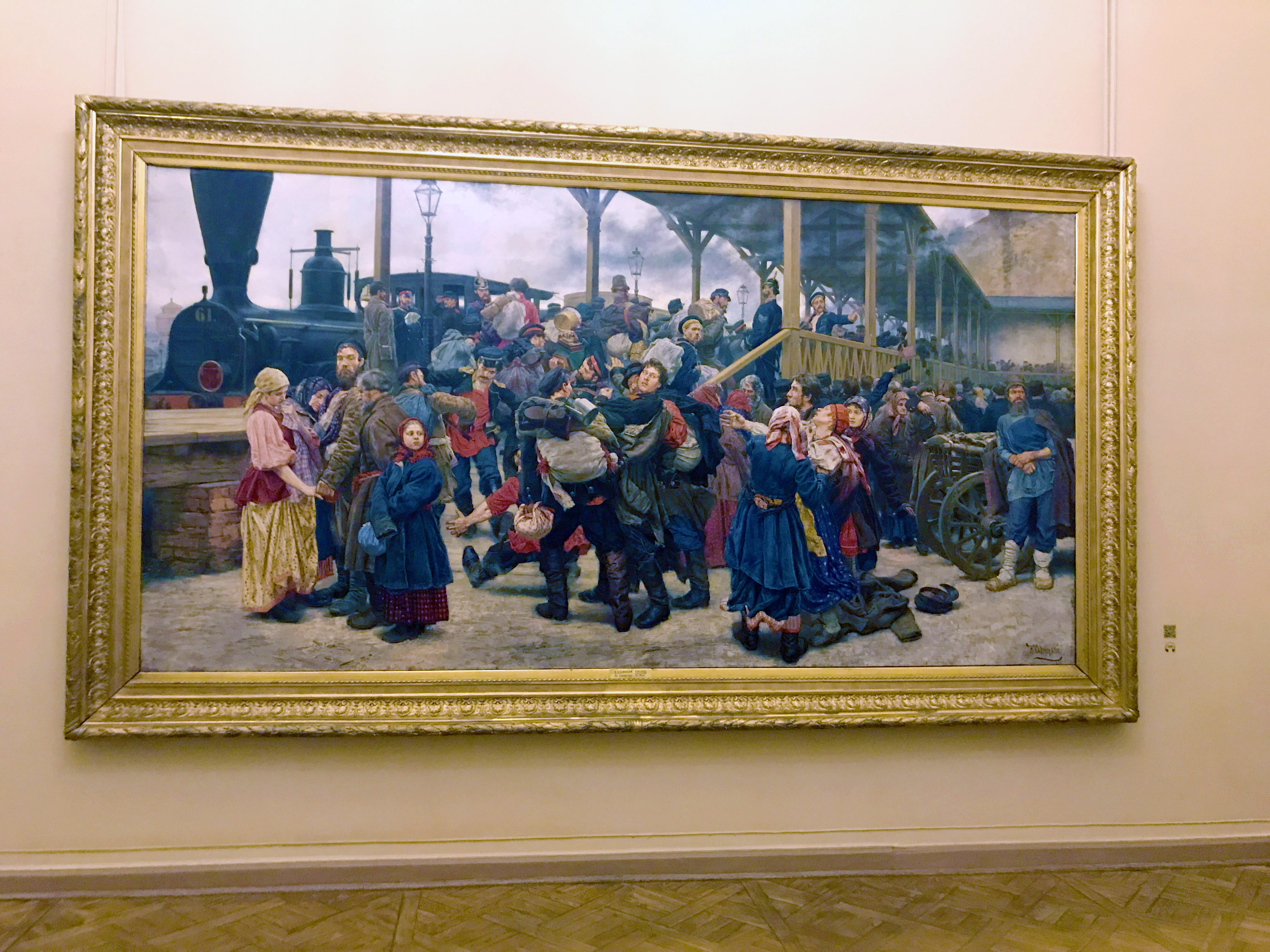
The painting To War in the State Russian Museum

The painting To War, was originally located in the Winter Palace. In 1897, it was transferred to the Russian Museum of Emperor Alexander III (subsequently renamed the State Russian Museum), where it remains to this day. The painting was initially exhibited alongside several other notable works, including Ilya Repin's Reply of the Zaporozhian Cossacks, Vasily Surikov's Yermak's conquest of Siberia, and Vasily Polenov's Christ and the Woman Taken in Adultery. Additionally, it was displayed alongside works by Academy artists, such as Wilhelm Kotarbiński's Orgy, Konstantin Makovsky's Kissing Ceremony, and Henryk Siemiradzki's Christ and Sinner. The canvas To War is currently on display in Hall 31 of the Mikhailovsky Palace, where it can be seen alongside such works as Harvest time (The Reapers) by Grigoriy Myasoyedov, In a Warm Lands by Nikolai Yaroshenko, and others.

The fate of the first version of the painting To War, completed in 1880, remained unknown for a long time. In 1955, the State Tretyakov Gallery organised an exhibition of Konstantin Savitsky's works, presenting the second (final) version of the painting from the State Russian Museum, as well as 13 paintings and 66 graphic works related to the artist's exploration of this theme. In an article dedicated to the painting To War, which was published following this exhibition, art historian Sofia Goldstein conducted an analysis of the 13 paintings mentioned above. She divided them into two distinct groups: studies, which were characterized by incompleteness, and well-developed multi-figure compositions. Based on her analyses, she concluded that the paintings in the second group were fragments of the initial version of the painting, which had apparently been cut up by the artist. Subsequently, this perspective became generally accepted. Some fragments of the first version of the painting are housed in the State Tretyakov Gallery, the State Russian Museum, the Poltava Art Museum, and in a private collection in Moscow.

== Subject and description ==
In his work, Savitsky depicts the events of the Russo-Turkish War of 1877-1878. The painting, which is a multi-figure composition, does not depict military action but instead portrays the grief of relatives and friends as they bid farewell to soldiers – reserve conscripts – who are going off to war. By opting to portray the last minutes before the separation, the artist was able to "show the actors at a time when all the feelings and thoughts, usually hidden from view, are more vividly manifested". The canvas depicts the various stages of this event. On the right-hand side, the background depicts a dense crowd, with individual figures merging into one another. The central section of the painting, which features multiple groups painted in detail, depicts the most intense moments of the action. In the background, at the rear of the composition, the soldiers who have already bidden their relatives farewell are climbing the platform, attempting to, for the final time, catch the gaze of those who have come to see them off.

Fragments of the final version of the painting To War (1888)

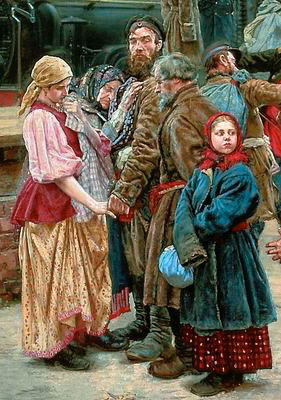
The group saying goodbye on the left side of the painting

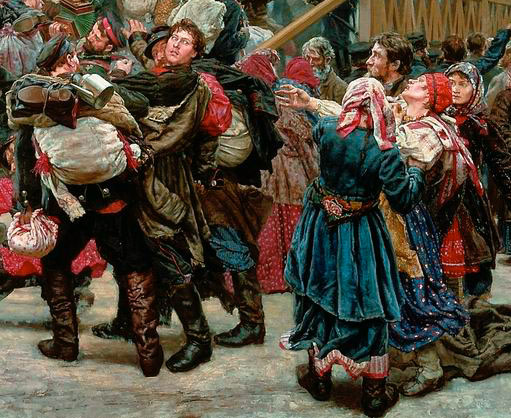
Centre group: soldiers take a conscript away from his wife and relatives

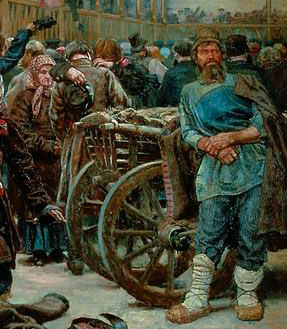
The peasant by the cart and the people saying goodbye in the crowd

The composition of the canvas is centred on the group of soldiers who have forcibly taken the conscript away from his wife and family. The conscript appears bewildered, seemingly unaware of the circumstances surrounding him and attempting to resist the violence, attempting to break free to return to his family. As posited by art historian Elena Levenfish, the image of this youthful, vibrant individual serves as a manifestation of defiance against the forces that condemn him and thousands of others to a fate of death. His wife, held and reassured by her relatives, struggles towards her departing husband, terrified by the imminent separation, "her terrible, heart-rending cry seems to fill the picture". The images of the young soldier and his wife present the most unadulterated form of the feelings experienced by other participants in the drama, which are otherwise concealed and restrained. At the same time, many of those around them are immersed in their own grief, thereby rendering the violent scene of the conscript's farewell to his wife unnoticed by the public.

The left side of the painting depicts another family group, in which a bearded soldier is seen bidding farewell to his parents and wife. This scene evinces a quality of "restrained and chaste grief." The soldier is not old and, like the other conscripts, he has served in the Tsarist army and has now been called up from the reserves. He thinks of the hard life without a breadwinner that his young wife and old parents will have to face. Without losing his dignity, he restrains his feelings with a strong tension; his face expresses "sublime nobility, majesty and inner significance". While he pensively clutches his wife's hand, his mother clings to his chest, not ruling out the possibility that this is the last time she will see her son. On the other side of the soldier is his father, next to whom stands a teenage girl, half turned to look at what is happening around her. This group was also present in the first version of the painting (fragment The group saying goodbye, Russian Museum), but it was on the right-hand side of the canvas rather than the left. In the final version of the painting, Savitsky "poeticized" the image of the soldier's wife compared to the 1880 version, depicting her as slimmer and younger, and more elegantly dressed, so that she even "somewhat lost the characteristic peasant look." The soldier's features have become more strong-willed, his father is less decrepit and his mother's face, which was hidden in the first version of the painting, is now visible. Other differences include the fact that the teenage girl in the 1880 version is holding a small child, which Savitsky decided not to include in the final version of the painting.

Another important figure is the peasant standing by the cart on the right-hand side of the canvas. Savitsky picks him out of the crowd of people bidding him farewell. His face, pose and movements convey strength and confidence. The peasant's clothes - a patched shirt, trousers, puttee and bast shoes - testify to his poverty. His figure is in the background, so that he can observe the farewell scene of the conscripts and their relatives in the foreground. The fact that he does not say goodbye to anyone suggests that his relatives are not among the soldiers going off to war - apparently he has just taken someone he knows with him on a cart. Obviously, he has seen a lot in his life, so he understands the essence of what is happening better than others - hence, according to Elena Levenfish's description, the "hatred in his sullen gaze, a maturing protest." Savitsky's contemporaries emphasised this character, calling him a "ploughman-athlete", a "mighty worker" and a "black soil strength". His image was later compared to two figures in Kramsky's paintings of the Peasant Cycle - Forester and Meditator. According to the art historian Mikhail Sokolnikov, the figure of the peasant forms a kind of centre in the right-hand part of the composition, and his "gigantic image breathes such power and strength, is so plastically expressive that the viewer feels in him a symbol of the people awakening to consciousness and the unbending will of the people". A similar image of the peasant was also present in the 1880 version, albeit with the addition of a weeping peasant woman next to him, covering her face with her hands and leaning against the edge of the cart (fragment Crying Peasant Woman and Peasant Man at the Cart, private collection). In contrast to the final version, in the initial version the group with the cart was situated in the foreground on the left side of the painting.

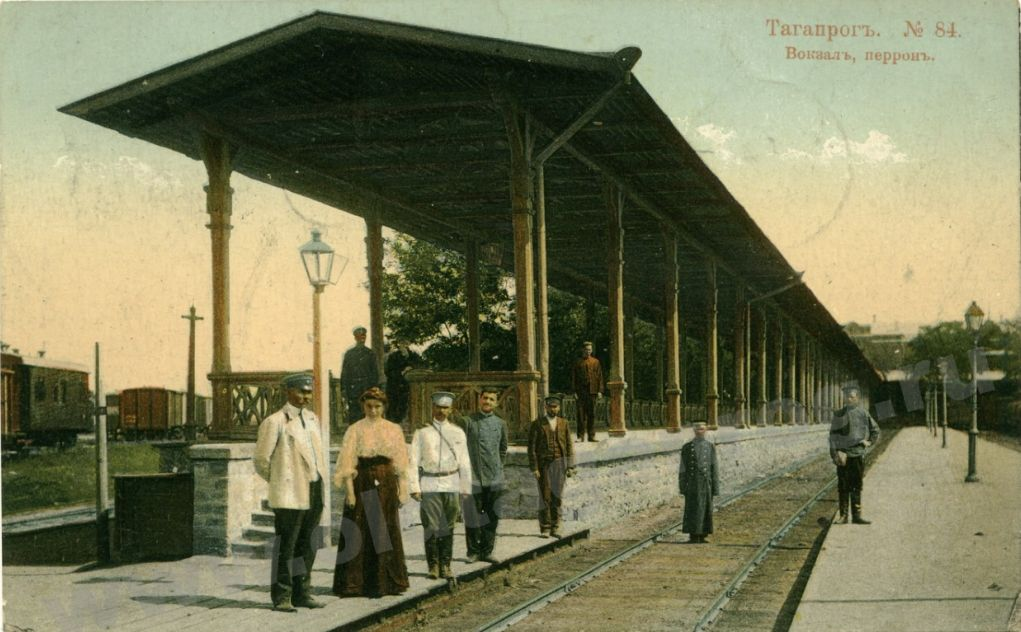
Old railway station landing stage in Taganrog

Another group of people saying goodbye can be discerned behind the cart, situated just to the left of the peasant. It consists of a soldier resting his head on his father's shoulder and a mother holding back tears as she sees her son off to war. In the 1880 version, this scene was positioned in the foreground on the left side of the painting. However, in the 1888 version, it was relocated to a more distant area, and because of this "lost its expressiveness".

In the background to the left of the painting, partially obscured by the figures in the foreground, is a group of drunken soldiers dancing to a harmonica and violin. According to Dmitry Sarabianov, "now these people do not care where they will be taken, what they will be forced to do, with whom they will have to fight; for a while they have drowned their greif in wine, but the more bitter the hangover will be". Other writers, on the other hand, saw in this scene "the breadth of Russian nature and the ineradicable folk optimism". The artist's wife, Valeria Ippolitovna, recalled that Savitsky "fiddled a lot with perspective, especially confused by the figure of the dancing soldier, where the leg is at a great angle".

In the background, soldiers climb the steps to the carriages. They are being watched by gendarmes who appear to be coldly indifferent to the people's grief. An officer stands on the platform, with two soldiers standing at attention in front of him. Unlike the first version of the painting, in which the station's platform was parallel to the plane of the canvas, the final version shows it in perspective distance. According to some sources, the painting depicts the landing stage of the Taganrog railway station, according to others it is one of the St Petersburg railway stations.

== Studies, fragments and repetitions ==
The State Russian Museum houses three studies for the original version of the painting To War dated 1878–1880. These are Two Old Women (oil on canvas, 38.5 × 42.5 cm, inv. Zh-1131, received from the Art Committee of the Council of People's Commissars of the RSFSR in 1932), Peasant at the Cart (oil on canvas, 15.5 × 22 cm, Inventory Zh-1163, received from N. M. Novopolsky in 1946), and Three Peasants Walking (oil on canvas, 22.5 × 15.5 cm, Inventory Zh-1163, received from Mikhail Avilov in 1937).

Studies for the first version of the painting To War (1880)

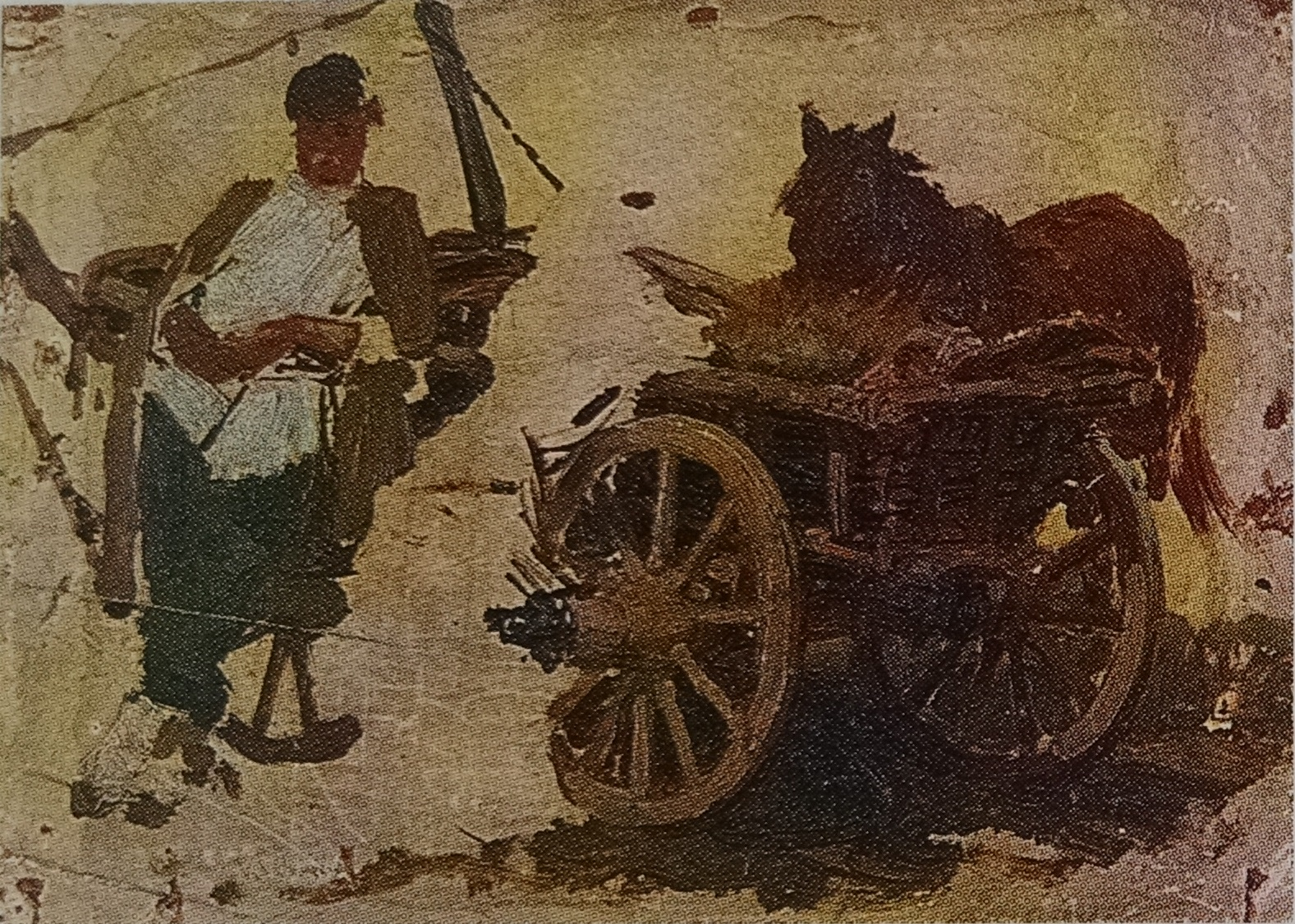
Peasant at the Cart

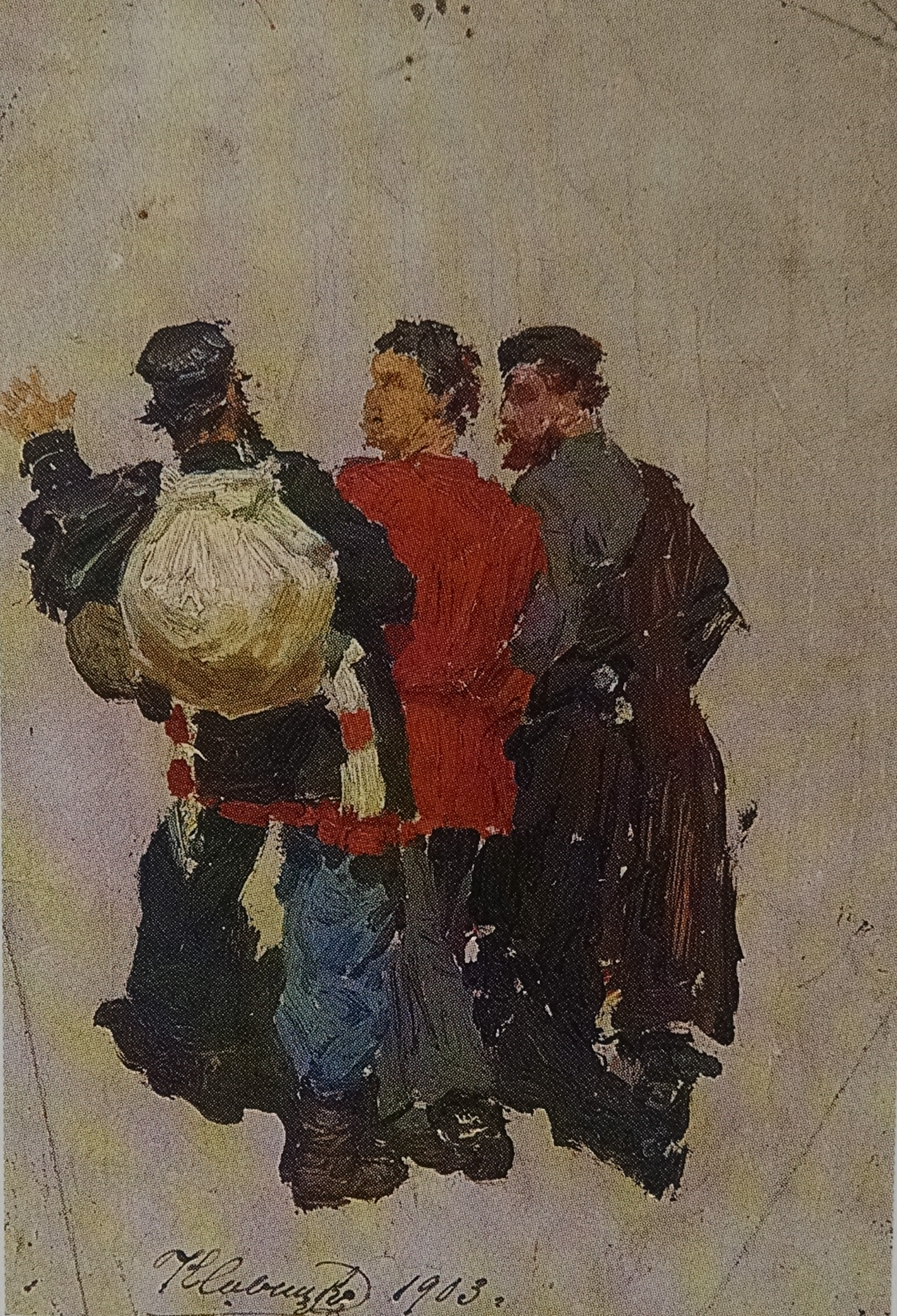
Three Peasants Walking

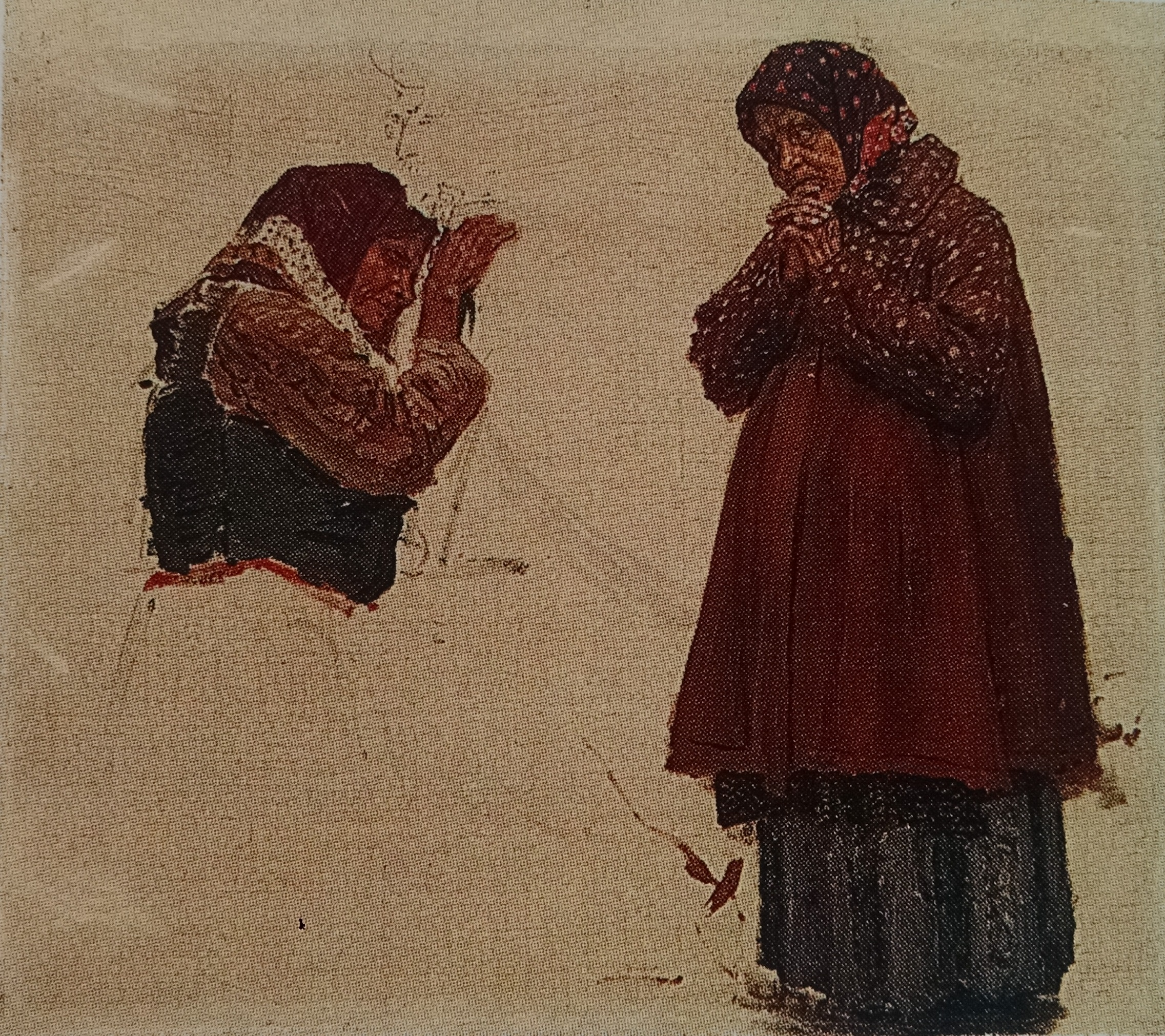
Two Old Women

The State Tretyakov Gallery holds three fragments of the original version of the painting To War (canvas, oil, 1880) - A Group of Soldiers with an Accordionist and a Violinist (29.5 × 29.7 cm, Inventory No. 10343, acquired from B. S. Petukhov in 1928), A Group Saying Goodbye to a New Recruit (48 × 31 cm, Inventory No. 11169, acquired from the Ilya Ostroukhov Museum in 1929), and Soldiers Crowding at Railway Carriages (23.8 × 52.4 cm, Inventory No. Zh-20, acquired from A. V. Gordon in 1956). The State Russian Museum owns another fragment of the original version of the painting, A Group Saying Goodbye (oil on canvas on cardboard, 70 × 56 cm, inv. Zh-1420, received from K. I. Shishkina in 1908). A fragment, entitled Soldiers Walking along the Landing Stage, is held in the Poltava Art Museum. Another fragment, entitled Crying Peasant Woman and Peasant Man at the Cart, is held in one of private collections in Moscow (according to information from 1955 to 1957, it is the collection of K. M. Shishkova).

Fragments of the first version of the painting To War (1880)

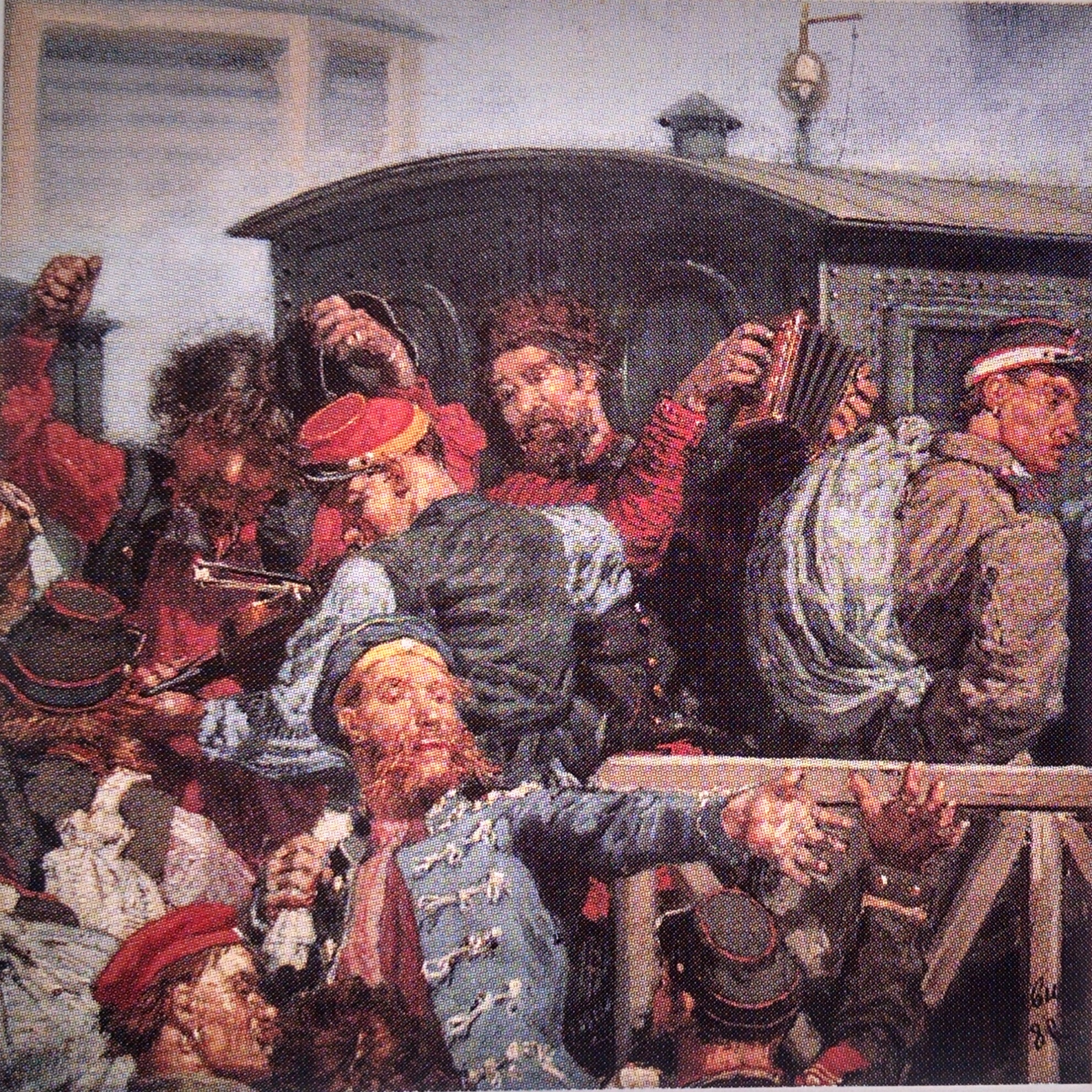
A Group of Soldiers with an Accordionist and a Violinist

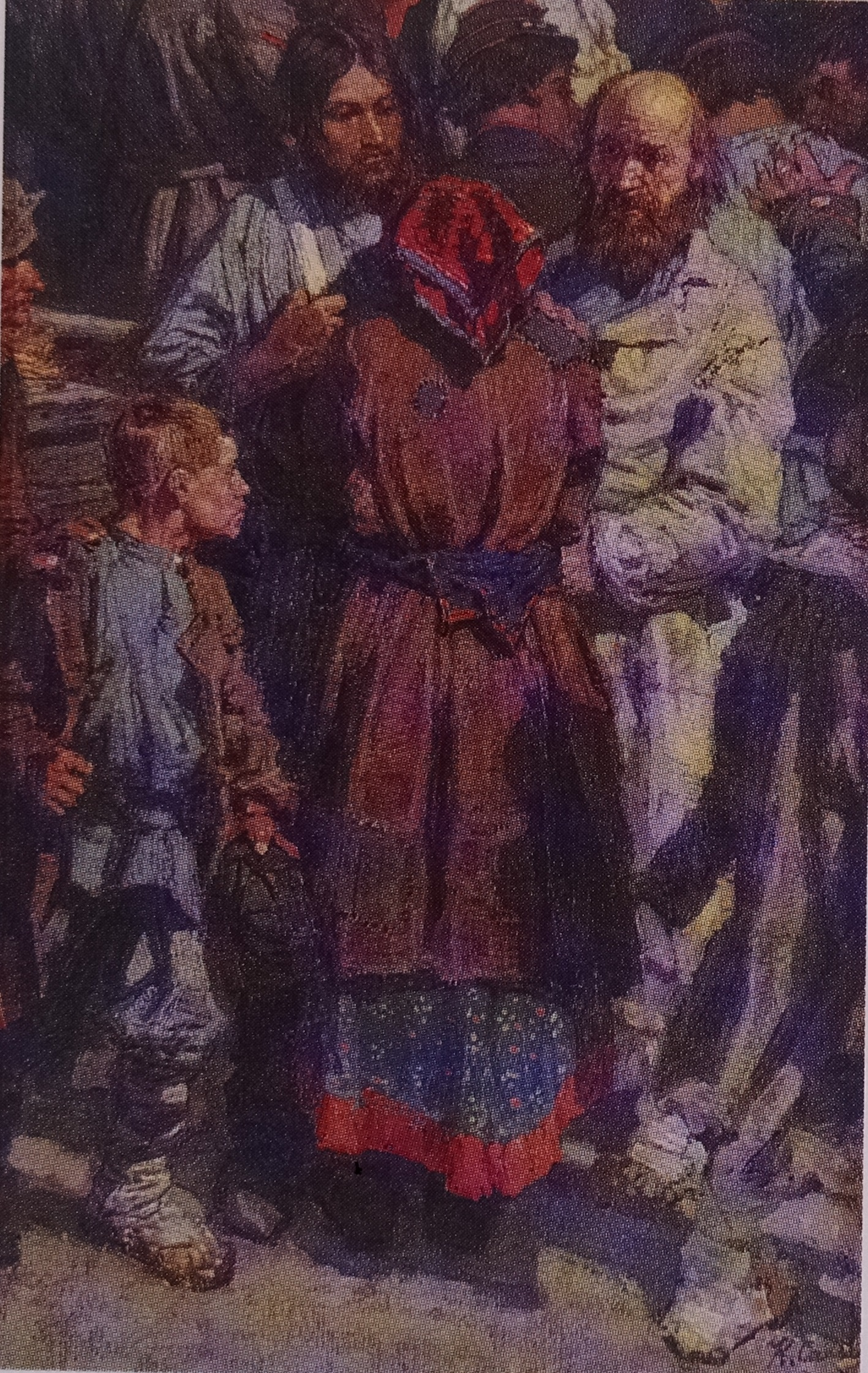
A Group Saying Goodbye to a New Recruit

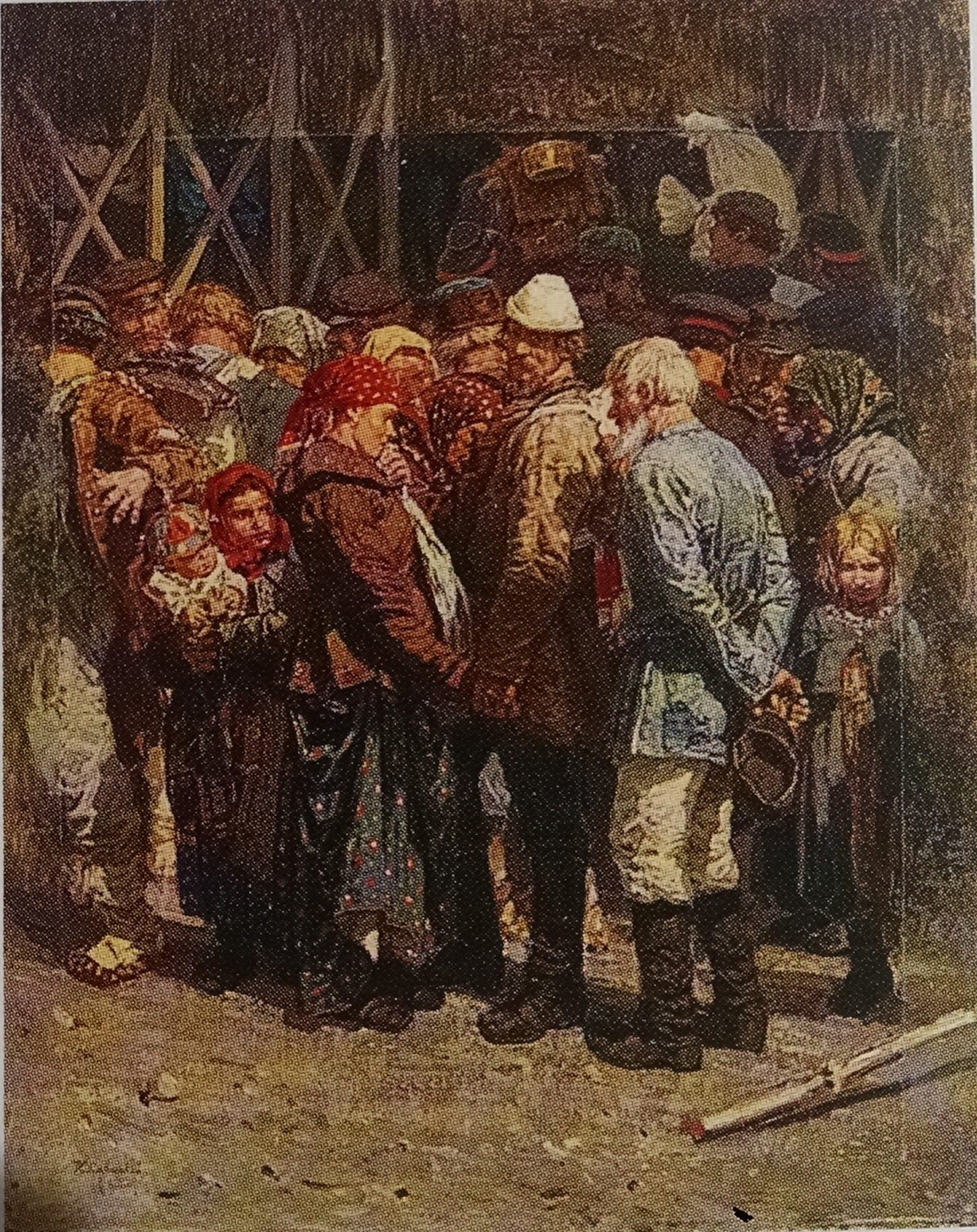
A Group Saying Goodbye

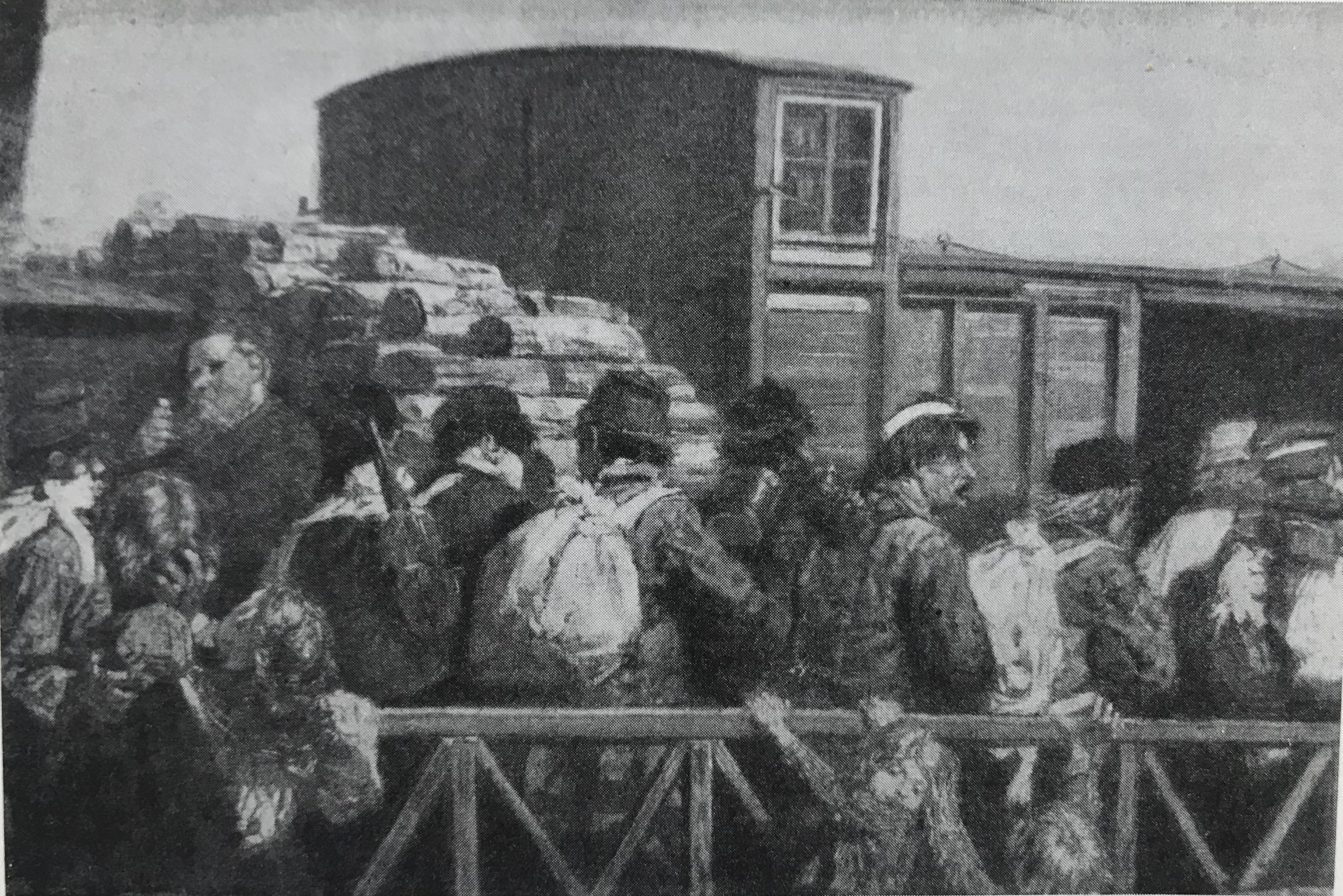
Soldiers Walking along the Landing Stage

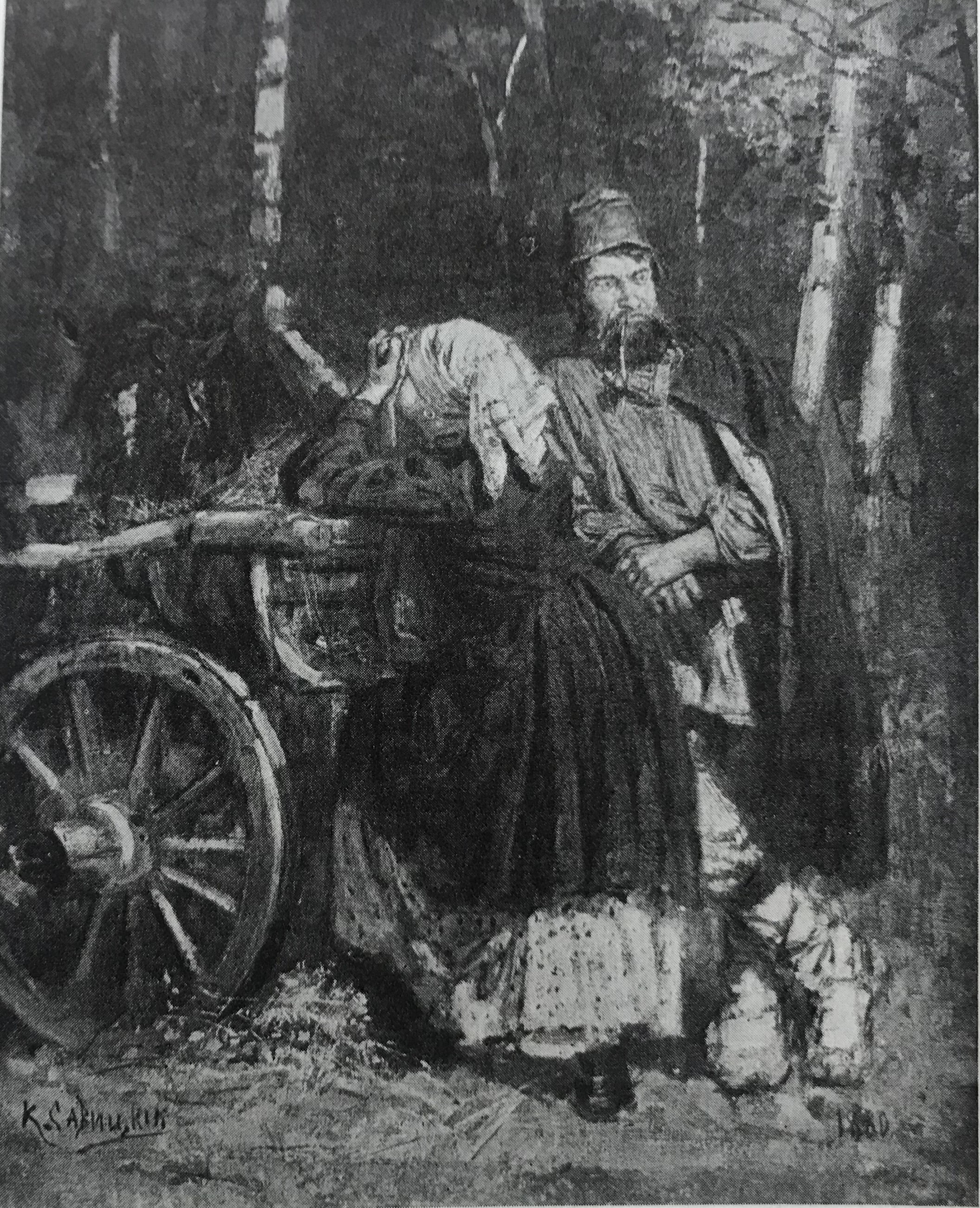
Crying Peasant Woman and Peasant Man at the Cart

Among the preparatory materials produced during the creation of the second version of the painting is the study entitled Crying Soldier (canvas, oil, 41.5 × 30 cm, 1880s). It was initially part of the Vysotsky collection in Moscow, subsequently transferred to the State Museum Fund, and in 1927 was acquired by the Smolensk Art Gallery (inv. Zh-98).

A smaller version of the painting To War (canvas, oil, 104 × 204 cm, inv. Zh-860), created by Savitsky in the same year, 1888, is held in the collection of the Perm State Art Gallery. It was transferred to the gallery in 1950 from the State Russian Museum.

== Reviews and criticism ==
In his article "16th Travelling Exhibition", published in the issue of News and Exchange Gazette on 6 March 1888, the critic Vladimir Stasov provided a comprehensive analysis of the painting To War, calling it Konstantin Savitsky's best creation. He wrote that it had enough "faithful human types, national and psychological truth", "tragic, wrenching scenes of farewell, carefree happiness, soldier's bravery, feminine grace and beauty in a simple young Russian peasant woman", and also noted "naivety and simplicity in old men and children", full of movement and life, "diversity of excitement of poor people", "diversity of interests" and ways of expressing them. Stasov noted that despite its "grey, bluish colour", this painting was "an important page in the history of Russian art". According to Stasov, "Savitsky is not a colourist, but he has many things that will always make you forget one or the other of his particular shortcomings".

In his book, History of Russian Painting in the 19th Century, first published in 1902, the artist and critic Alexandre Benois describes Savitsky's painting To War as a "clearly unsuccessful thing." However, he also acknowledges that its power of expression sets it apart as one of the best works created by the Peredvizhniki. In the view of Benois, even if technically Savitsky's most accomplished paintings, including To War, are inferior to those of Ilya Repin, they are nevertheless "quite satisfactory works, standing far above the general level of the school". According to Benois, Savitsky's principal advantages over his contemporaries were his objectivity and his "serious attention to landscape, types and poses."

In 1947 the art historian Mikhail Sokolnikov wrote that painting Seeing off to War was one of the "most significant paintings of the Russian realist school". Noting the ideological content, the monumentality of the subject and execution, and the popular character of the painting, Sokolnikov pointed out its affinity with the works of Ilya Repin. He wrote that the domestic plot of Savitsky's painting, depicting the farewell of conscripts going off to war, was "a broad, substantial and typical phenomenon of old life", to which the artist had given "a choral, popular, generalising meaning", imbuing it with a deep social meaning. According to Sokolnikov, Savitsky's painting, "terrible in its drama", managed to convey the psychology of the masses, the confusion of peasants sent to war who "do not know where they will be taken next, with whom and for what, for what interests they are going to war". For Sokolnikov, this "exposure" was the main point of Savitsky's painting.

In a book published in 1955, art historian Dmitry Sarabianov noted that the main character in To War is the people, through whose tragedy "the contradictions of reality" of the time are revealed. In Savitsky's painting, this tragedy "takes on an optimistic tone" because of the "great inner strength lurking" in the masses of people depicted by the artist. In Sarabianov's opinion, the painting To War, with its positive image of the people, develops the traditions of such paintings as Repin's Barge Haulers on the Volga and Savitsky's Repair Work on the Railway. It emphasises the "dramatic conflict of the action", which sharpens the feelings of the characters and gives the interpretation of the scene the heroism and suspense of such Surikov paintings as The Morning of the Streltsy Execution and Boyarina Morozova.

== Bibliography ==
- Артёмов, В.В. (2002). Войны, сражения, полководцы в произведениях классической живописи [Wars, battles, commanders in works of classical painting]. Героическая история России (in Russian). Moscow: Олма-пресс. ISBN 5-224-01585-5.
- Benois, Alexandre (1995). История русской живописи в XIX веке [History of Russian painting in the 19th century] (in Russian). Moscow: Республика. ISBN 5-250-02524-2.
- Боровиков, С.Г. (2008). "В русском жанре — 38" [In the Russian genre - 38]. Волга (in Russian). 4 (417).
- Гольдштейн, С.Н. (1957). "Из истории создания картины К. А. Савицкого "На войну"" [From the history of creation of K.A. Savitsky's painting "To War"]. Iskusstvo (in Russian) (4): 62–65.
- Гомберг-Вержбинская, Э.П. (1970). Передвижники [Peredvizhniki] (in Russian). Leningrad: Iskusstvo.
- Иванова, Ю.А.; Кондратович, Н.А. (2003). Жанровые сцены. Часть II [Genre scenes. Part II]. Детский музей. Русская живопись (in Russian). Moscow: Русское энциклопедическое товарищество. ISBN 5-901227-38-7.
- Коровкевич, С.В. (1961). "Бытовая живопись 1870—1880-х годов" [Household painting of the 1870s-1880s]. История русского искусства [History of Russian Art] (in Russian). А. Л. Каганович. Moscow: Publishing house of the Academy of Arts of the Soviet Union. pp. 217–222.
- Левенфиш, Е.Г. (1959). Константин Аполлонович Савицкий [Konstantin Apollonovich Savitsky] (in Russian). Leningrad - Moscow: Iskusstvo.
- Моложавенко, В.С. (1976). Повесть о Тихом Доне. Приглашение к путешествию [A Tale of the Silent Don. Invitation to a journey] (in Russian). Moscow: Советская Россия.
- Polovtsov, Alexander (2005). Дневник государственного секретаря [Diary of a Secretary of State] (in Russian). Vol. 1. 1883—1886. Moscow: Центрполиграф. ISBN 5-9524-1196-7.
- Repin, Ilya (1969). Избранные письма [Selected Letters] (in Russian). Vol. 1 (1867—1892). Moscow: Iskusstvo.
- Рогинская, Ф.С. (1989). Товарищество передвижных художественных выставок [Society for Travelling Art Exhibitions] (in Russian). Moscow: Iskusstvo.
- Романов, Г.Б. (2003). Товарищество передвижных художественных выставок. 1871—1923. Энциклопедия [Society for Travelling Art Exhibitions. 1871-1923. Encyclopaedia] (in Russian). Saint Petersburg: Санкт-Петербург Оркестр. ISBN 5-87685-054-3.
- Сарабьянов, Д.В. (1955). Народно-освободительные идеи русской живописи второй половины XIX века [People's liberation ideas in Russian painting of the second half of the 19th century] (in Russian). Moscow: Iskusstvo.
- Сокольников, М.П. (1947). Савицкий [Savitsky]. Массовая библиотека (in Russian). Moscow: Iskusstvo.
- Stasov, Vladimir (1952). Избранные сочинения: живопись, скульптура, музыка [Selected Works: Painting, Sculpture, Music] (in Russian). Vol. 2. Moscow: Iskusstvo.
- Stasov, Vladimir (1952). Статьи и заметки, публиковавшиеся в газетах и не вошедшие в книжные издания [Articles and notes published in newspapers and not included in book editions] (in Russian). Vol. 1. Moscow: Издательство Академии художеств СССР.
- Цветова, А.В. (1959). Пермская государственная художественная галерея. Путеводитель [Perm State Art Gallery. Guide] (in Russian). Vol. 1. Perm: Пермское книжное издательство.
- Государственная Третьяковская галерея — каталог собрания [State Tretyakov Gallery - catalogue of the collection] (in Russian). Vol. 4: Живопись второй половины XIX века, книга 2, Н–Я. Я. В. Брук, Л. И. Иовлева. Moscow: Красная площадь. 2006. ISBN 5-900743-22-5. 9
- Государственный Русский музей — Живопись, XVIII — начало XX века (каталог) [State Russian Museum - Painting, 18th - early 20th century (catalogue)] (in Russian). Leningrad: Aurora and Iskusstvo. 1980.
- Государственный Русский музей — каталог собрания [State Russian Museum - catalogue of the collection] (in Russian). Vol. 7: Живопись второй половины XIX века (Н—Я). В.А. Леняшин. Saint Petersburg: Palace Editions. 2017. ISBN 978-3-906917-17-7.
- Государственный Русский музей — Из истории музея [State Russian Museum - From the history of the museum] (in Russian). И.Н. Карасик, Е.Н. Петрова. Saint Petersburg: State Russian Museum. 1995. ISBN 5-900872-04-1.
- Пермская государственная художественная галерея. Каталог произведений живописи, скульптуры, графики [Perm State Art Gallery. Catalogue of works of painting, sculpture, graphics] (in Russian). В.И. Корнилова. Perm: Пермское книжное издательство. 1963.
- Русская жанровая живопись XIX — начала XX века [Russian genre painting of the 19th - early 20th century]. Т.Н. Горина. Moscow: Iskusstvo. 1964.
