= Droshky =

Russian carriage

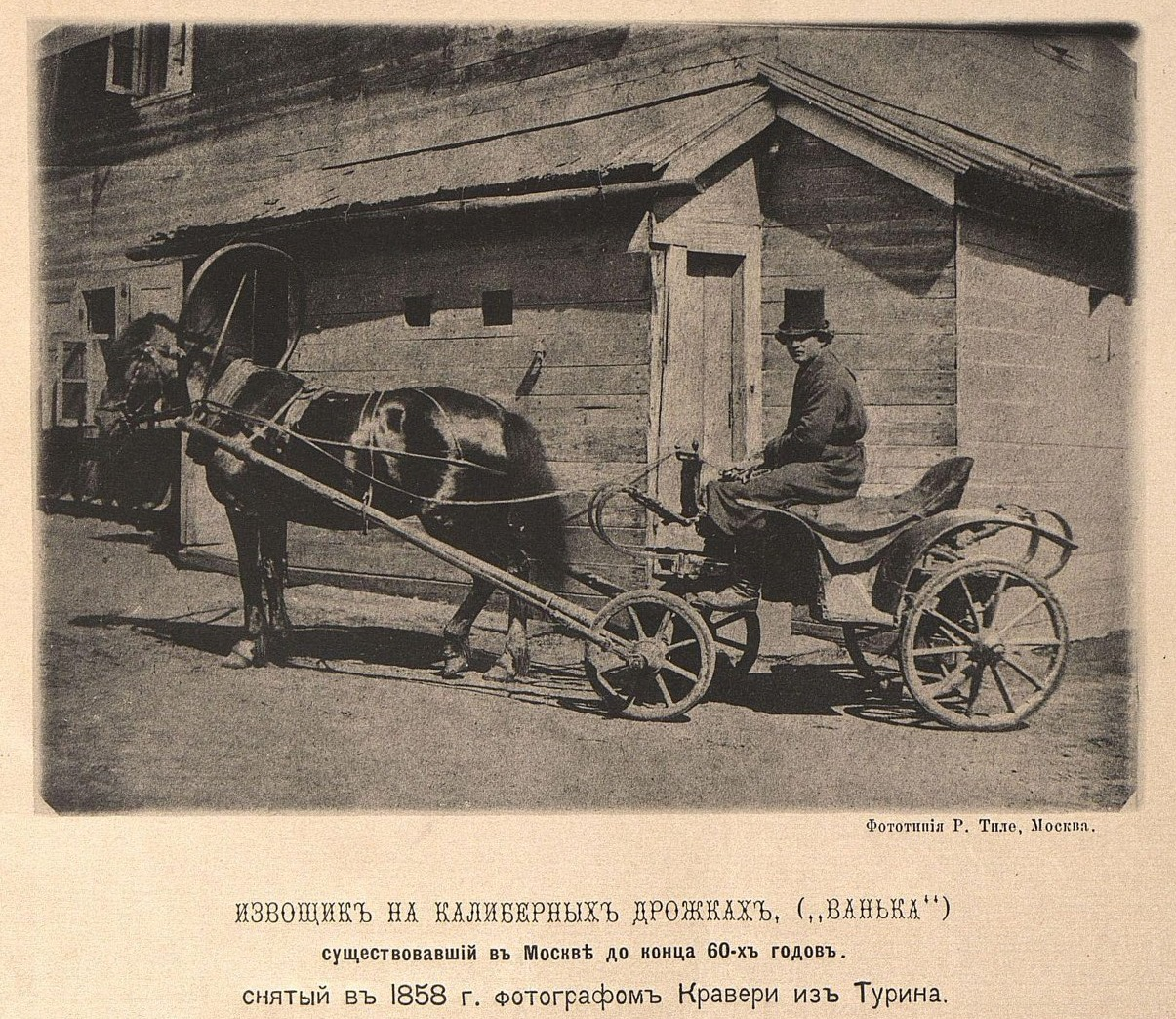
Drosky 1858

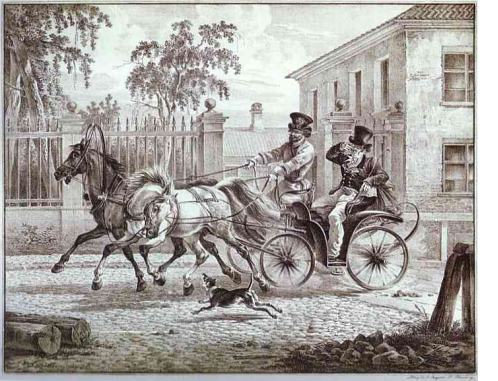
Dorożka (Street-cab), a sketch by Aleksander Orłowski

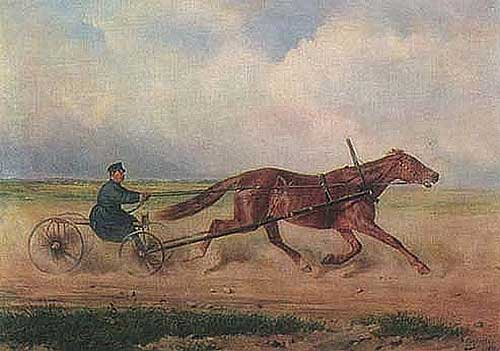
Orlov Trotter Krasa in racing droshky by Sverchkov

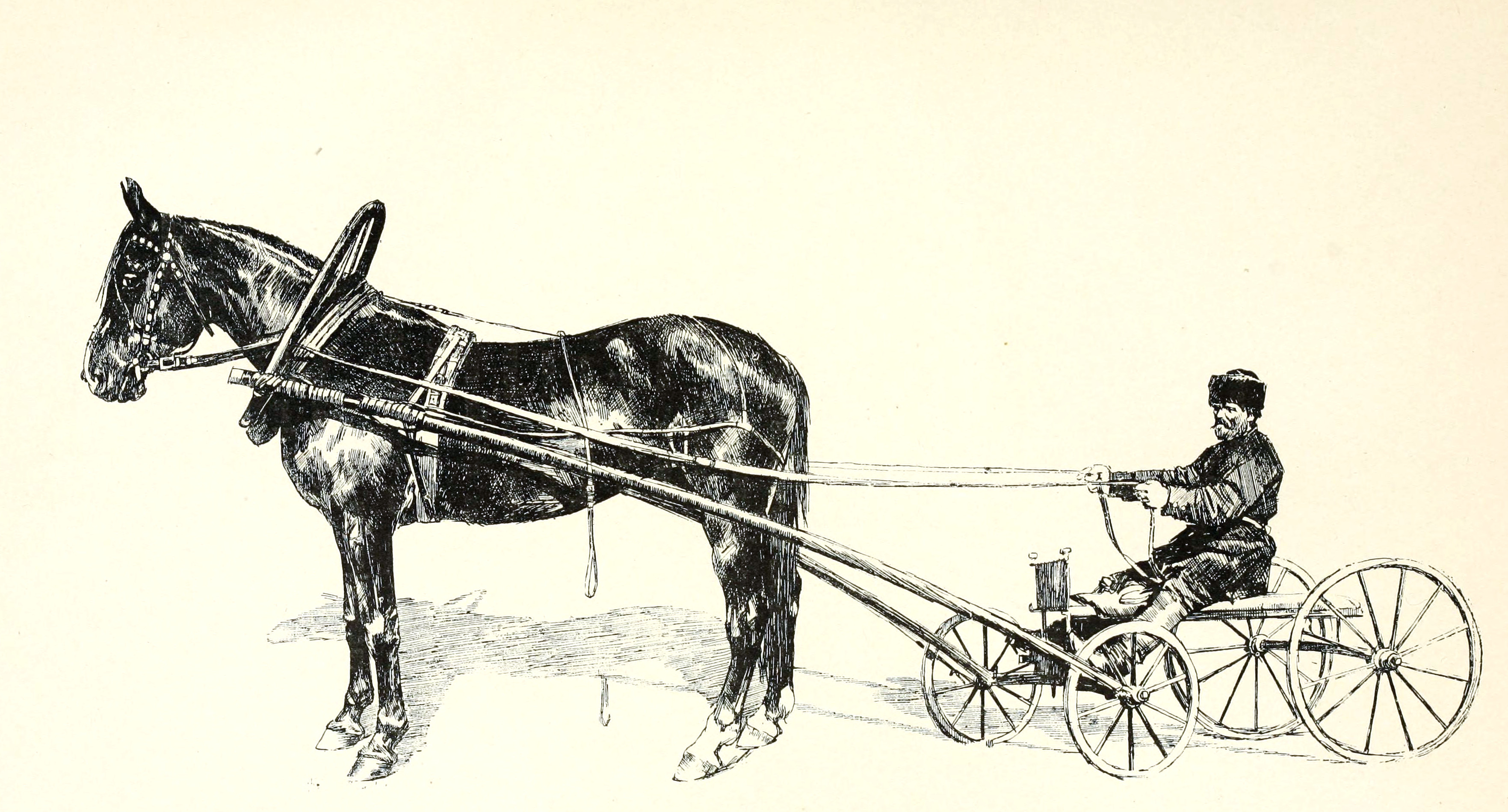
A racing droshky

A droshky or drosky (Russian: дрожки (plural); Polish: dorożka (singular); German: Droschke (singular); Estonian: troska (singular)) is a term used for a four-wheeled open carriage used especially in Russia. The vehicle has a long bench on which the driver or passengers sit as if on a saddle, either astride or sideways. From droga, the beam that connects the front and rear axles.

== See also ==
- Glossary of Russian horse-drawn vehicles
- Horses in Russia
