= Britzka =

Horse drawn carriage

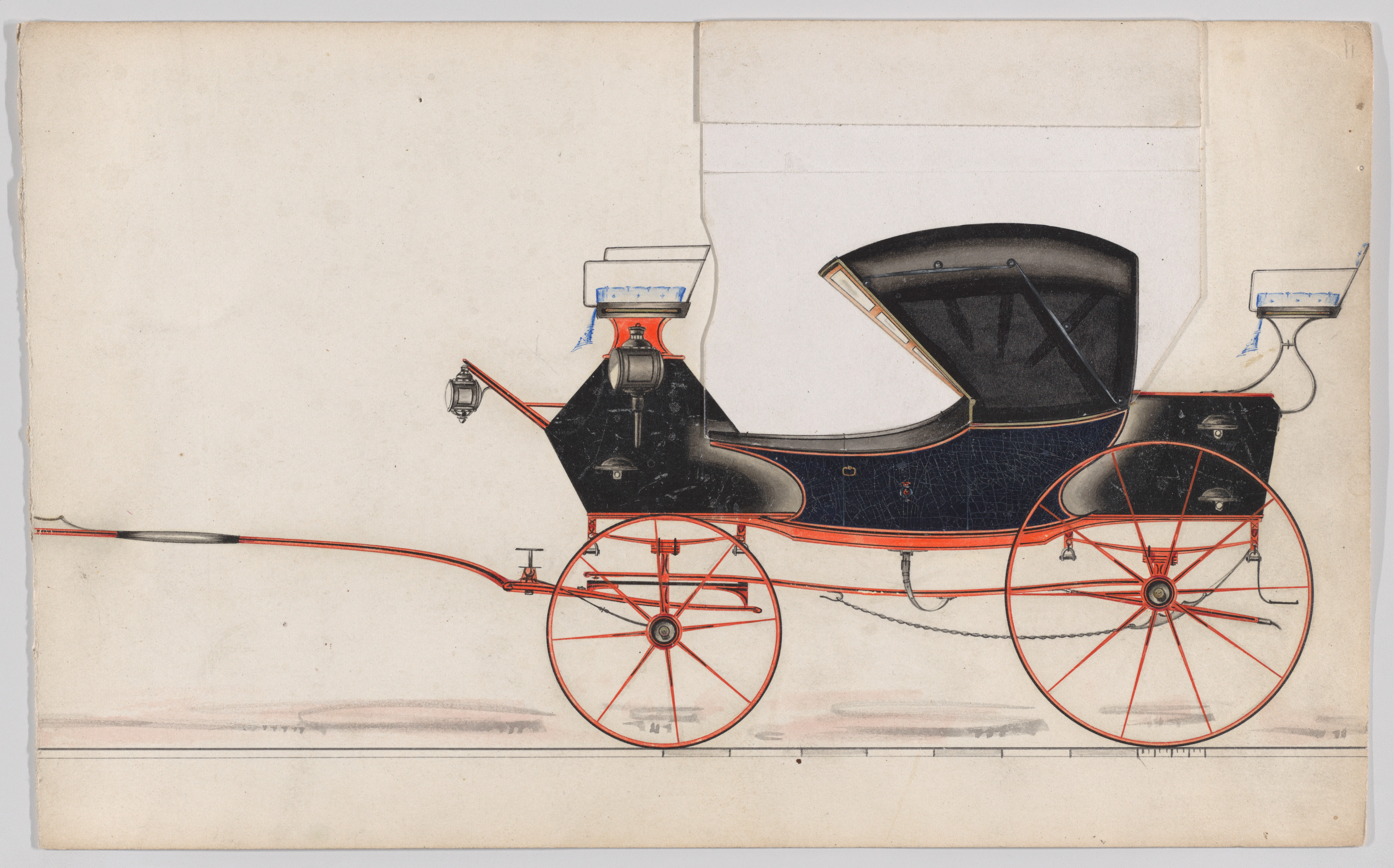
American Britzka design (1850–1870)

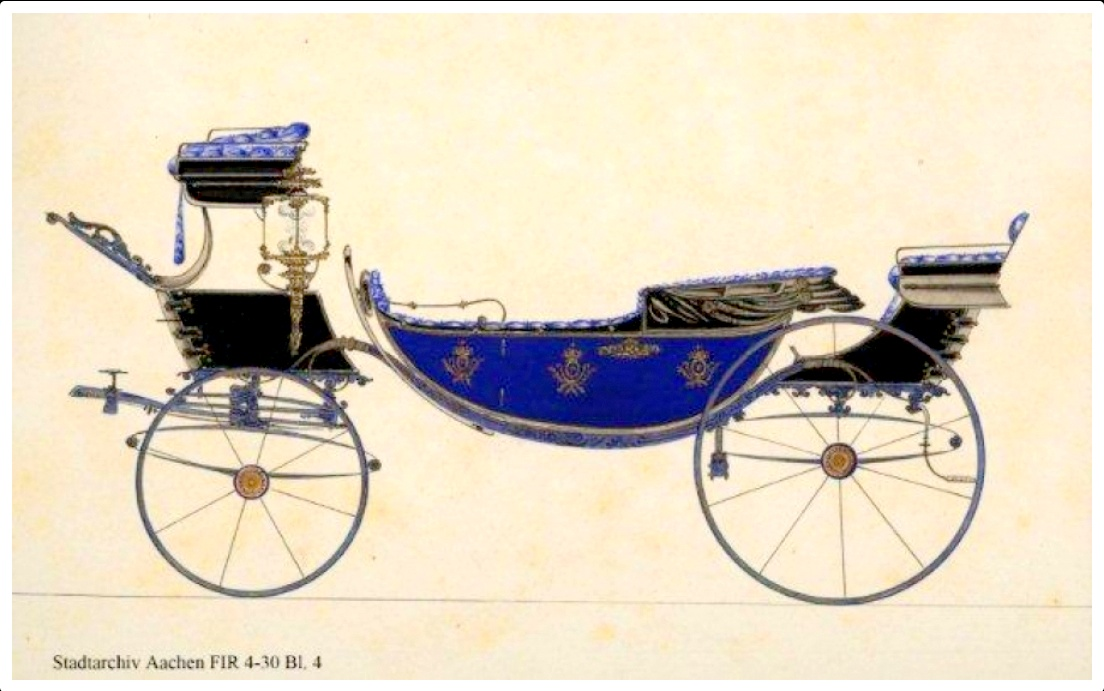
Austrian Britschka design (c. 1870)

A britzka or britschka (with numerous spelling variations (Note: Variously spelled: briska, britchka, britschka, britska, britzcha, britzka, britzschka, and britzska. Nicknamed briskie and brisker by English post boys and coachmen.)) is a type of horse-drawn carriage. What was originally an open wagon in Poland and Eastern Europe, became a passenger vehicle in Austria and was exported to Western Europe where it became popular as a travelling carriage. The carriage had four wheels, a long body with two seats (face to face), and a folding hood over the rear seat. The body could be converted to sleep two people full length. There was an elevated seat for the driver in front and a rear platform with a rumble seat for servants.

The term is a variant of the Polish term bryczka, a "little cart", from bryka, "cart", possibly coming into English via several ways, including German Britschka and Russian brichka (бричка).

The Great Western Railway engineer Isambard Kingdom Brunel used a black britzka as a mobile office whilst surveying the route of the railway. Nicknamed 'the flying hearse', it carried a drawing board, outline plans, engineering instruments, his favorite cigars, and a pull-out bed.
