= Telega =

Russian horse-drawn wagon

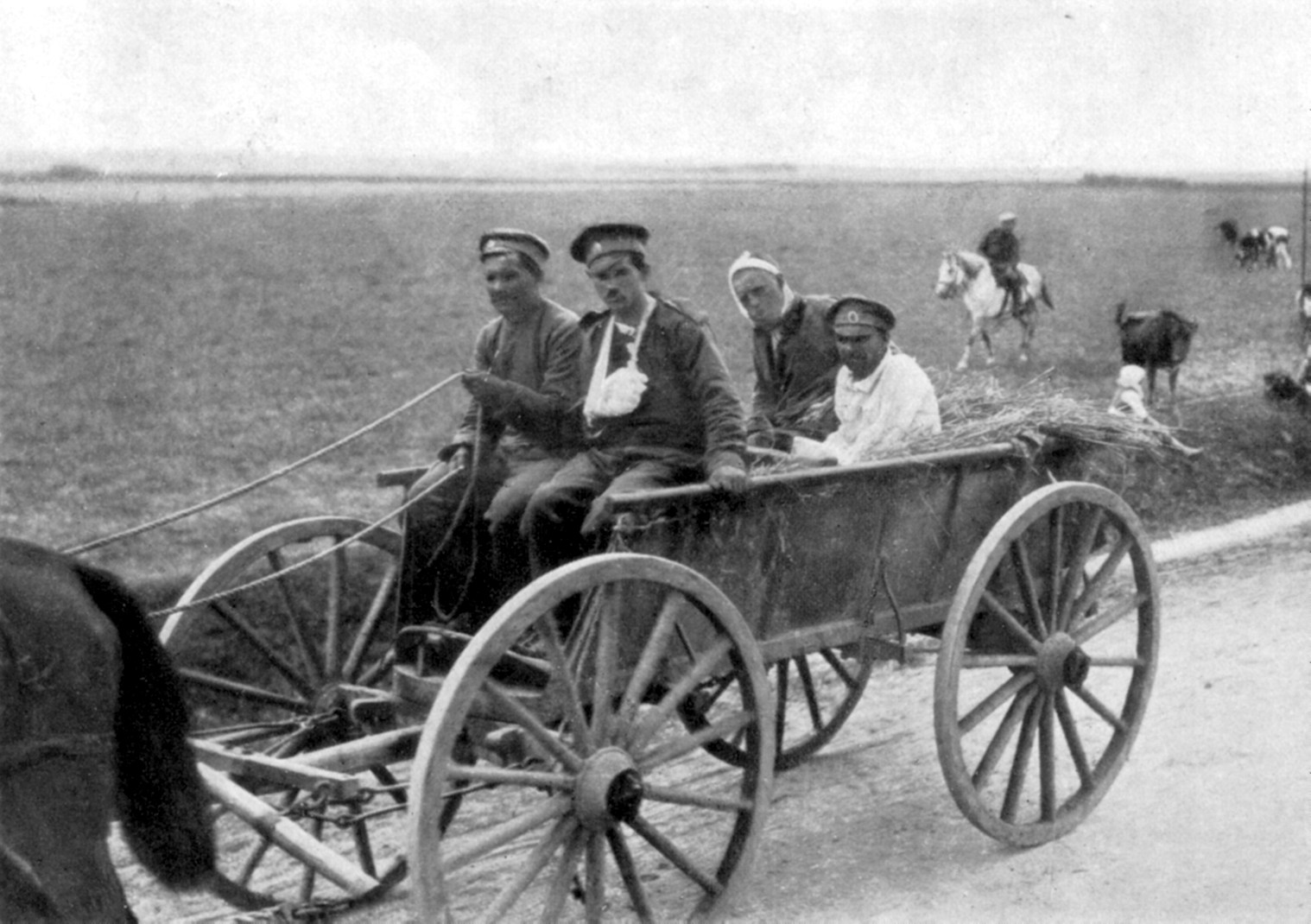
Wounded Russian soldiers in a telega (World War I)

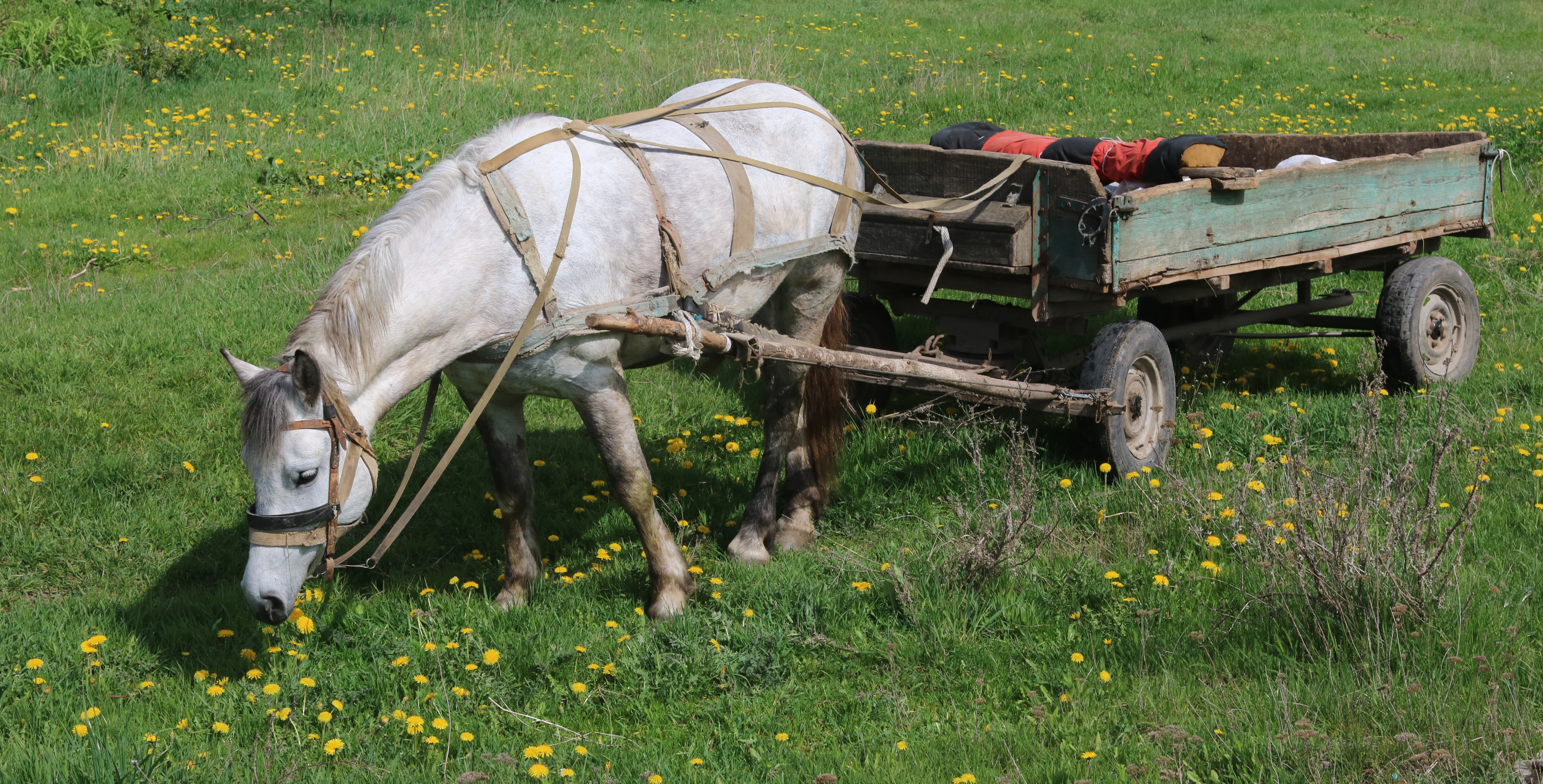
Telega (modern variant). Used in Ukraine in 2017

Telega (Russian: теле́га, IPA: [tʲɪˈlʲɛgə]) is a type of four-wheel horse-drawn vehicle, whose primary purpose is to carry loads, similar to a wain, known in Russia and other countries. It has been defined as "a special type commonly used in the southern and south-western provinces for the carriage of grain, hay and other agricultural products".

It is described and spelled telga in Jules Verne's novel Michael Strogoff. It is spelled telyega in Leo Tolstoy's story "The Two Old Men" in Tolstoy: Tales of Courage and Conflict.

== See also ==
- Glossary of Russian horse-drawn vehicles
- Horses in Russia
