= Horses in Russia =

The presence of horses in Russia is evidenced by prehistoric fossils and has remained consistent throughout its history, particularly during the Soviet era, due to the integration of territories with a strong equestrian tradition. Trick riding has its origins in the military practices of the Russian Cossacks. Russian equestrian culture is characterized by the exclusive use of the "duga" yoke, known in particular through the troika.

== History ==
According to Carole Ferret, the history of the horse in Russia has predominantly been explored by Soviet researchers from the relevant regions, resulting in limited accessibility to material and knowledge on the subject. Equine fossils dating from the Plio-Pleistocene have been found at Liventsovka, near Rostov-on-Don.

During Imperial times and shortly thereafter, horse breeding was primarily conducted by peasants, for whom it represented a vital resource. Horse theft was both common and feared, with numerous accounts documenting the lynching of thieves recognized by the community. Under the Soviet regime, regions with a strong equestrian tradition included Yakutia, Kazakhstan, Turkmenistan, and Kyrgyzstan, as well as Buryat populations. The integration of horses from conquered territories into the Russian army remains a topic of debate. The equestrian culture of the Cossacks, known for their ability to ride freely and exhibit considerable agility, is closely linked to the military practices that gave rise to trick riding.

== Breeding ==
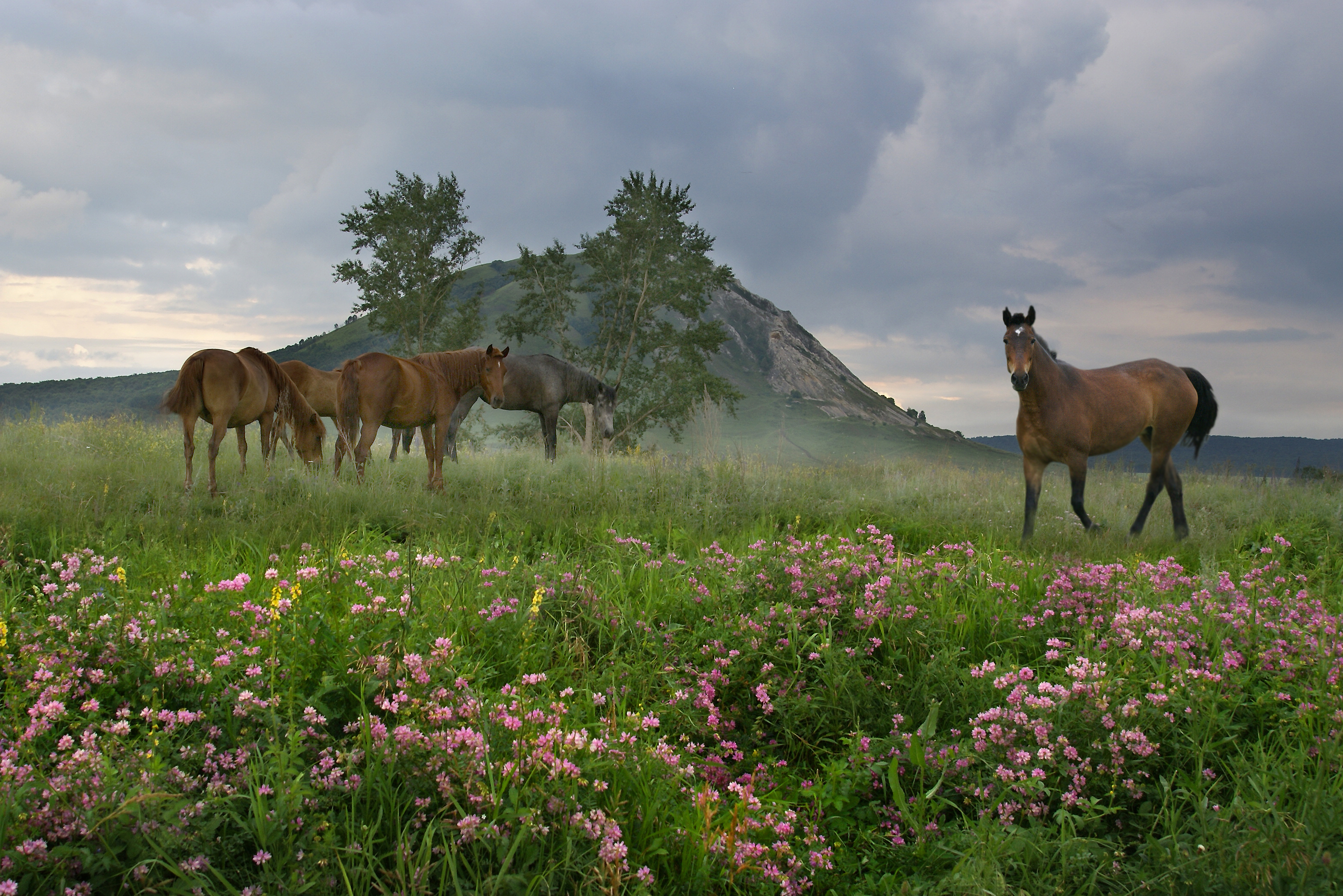
Group of Bashkir horses

Russia is home to a diverse array of horse breeds. The University of Oklahoma identifies 64 distinct horse breeds that were developed in the country during the Soviet era. Including extinct horses and Przewalski's horse (which is not classified as a breed), the FAO lists 69 horse breeds present or formerly present on the territory of the Russian Federation.

Among the most notable breeds, the Don horse is traditionally associated with the Don Cossacks, who bred it from crosses with oriental horses as early as the 16th century. The breed gained prominence due to its contributions to the Don Cossack victories over Napoleon's armies in 1812 and 1814. While French horses struggled with the unfamiliar climate, the Don horses were selectively bred for resilience in the harsh Russian winter.

In 1948, the Russian Federation had an average of 15 horses per 100 inhabitants. This statistic highlights significant regional disparities within the USSR: the number increased to 34 in Buryatia and 50 in Yakutia.

== Applications ==
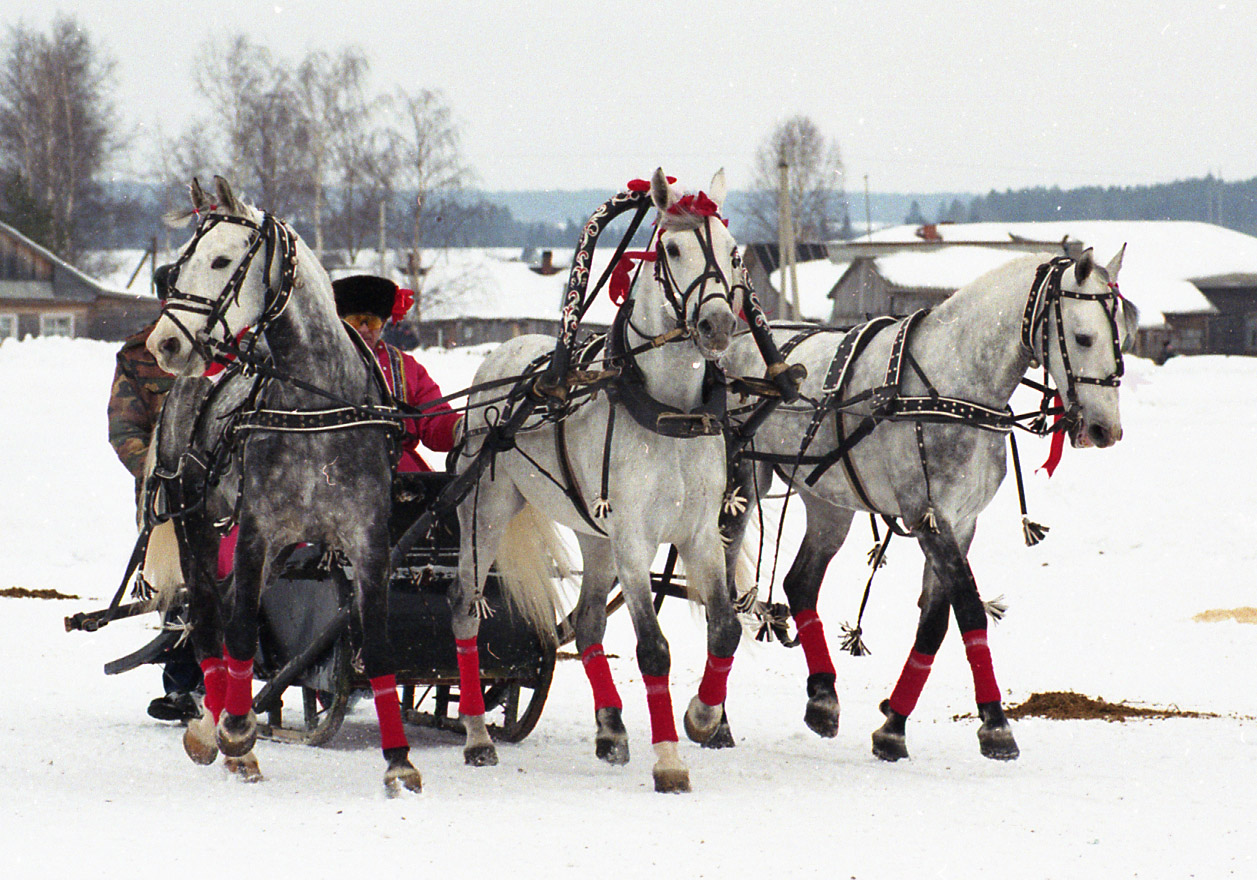
Troika utilizing the "douga" (on the middle horse).

The Russians and Yakuts use four-wheeled horse-drawn vehicles known as "telegas" for transportation. The Russian "douga" yoke, named after one of its components, is most recognized in its form as the troika, which was first documented in the 16th century. This yoke is characterized by the douga, an elastic wooden arch that connects the stretchers over the horse's withers, serving to keep the stretchers apart. The douga is used exclusively in Russia and offers the advantage of more efficiently harnessing the horse's strength, but it has the limitation of accommodating only one horse in a troika configuration, where only the middle horse is fitted with the douga.

Traditionally, Russians do not consume horse meat. However, there has been a gradual integration of populations, such as the Yakuts, for whom horsemeat consumption is customary. This cultural exchange did not result in a prohibition of horsemeat in Sakha; rather, it led to a "partial conversion of the Russians to horse-eating", as Russian settlers in the region began to adopt this practice.

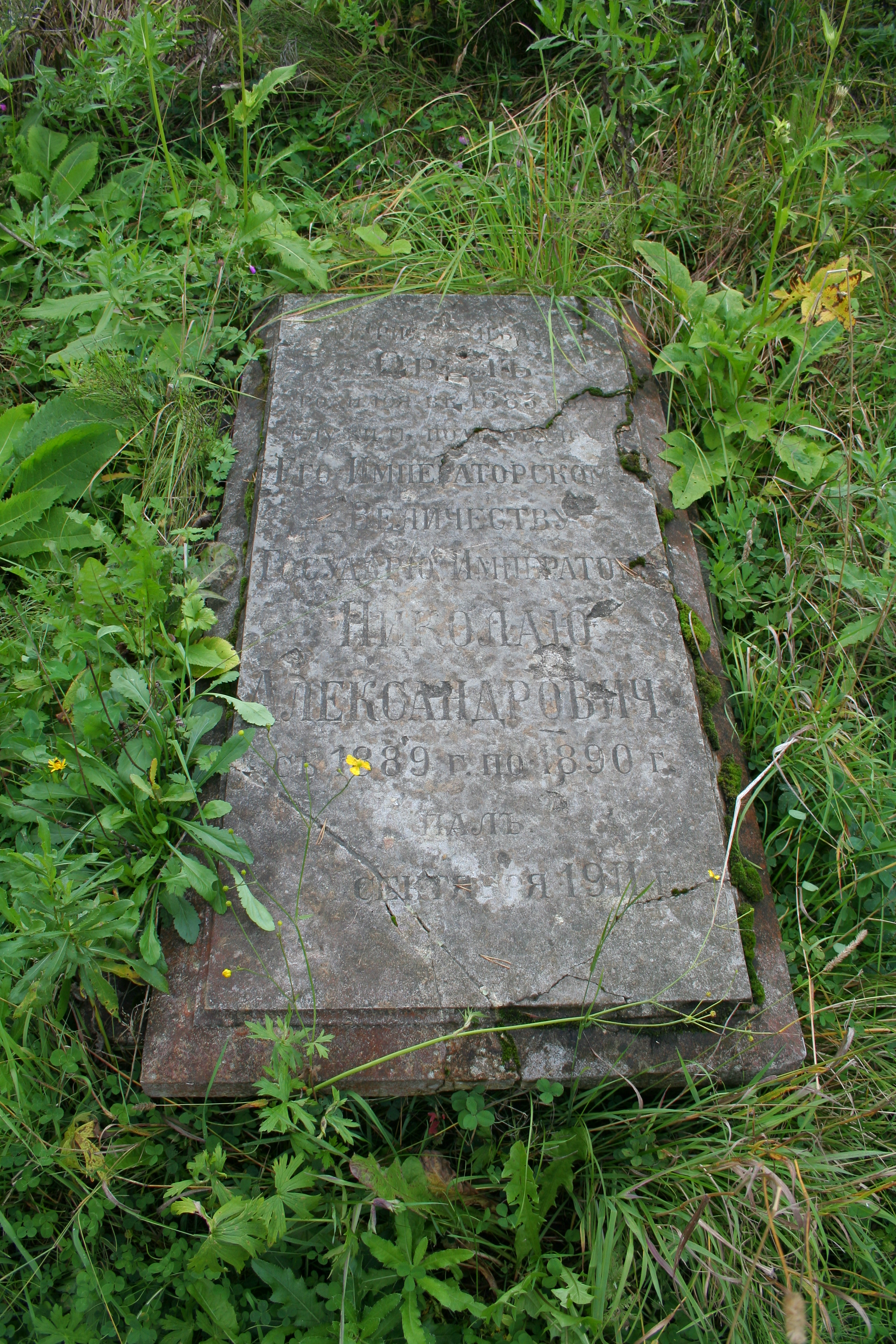
Tomb of a horse that belonged to Alexander III.

== Patrimony ==
Russia is home to the Imperial Horse Graveyard, which is likely the largest horse cemetery in the world. Active from 1834 to 1915, the cemetery fell into disrepair during the Soviet era. French writer Jean-Louis Gouraud, who rediscovered the site, has undertaken efforts to raise funds for its restoration.

The Central Moscow Hippodrome, one of the largest in Russia and the oldest in Europe, organizes renowned trotting races, hosts research and experimental teams on horse breeding, and houses a riding school.

== Culture ==
The tale of The Little Humpbacked Horse, written in 1834 by Pyotr Yershov, based on Russian folklore, is the inspiration for a ballet and an animated film.

Nicolas Swertschkoff (1817-1898) was a prominent artist specializing in horse painting, particularly equestrian portraits. He demonstrated a remarkable mastery of the animal's anatomy and expressions. Similarly, the Russian sculptor Evgueni Alexandrovitch Lanceray (1848-1886), recognized as "one of the best horse portraitists in the world", created approximately 400 works, with half dedicated to his favored subject. His work also inspired the American artist Frederic Remington. Despite remaining somewhat in the shadows, Lanceray was passionate about his subject and owned around twenty horses at his residence in Neskoutchnoïe.

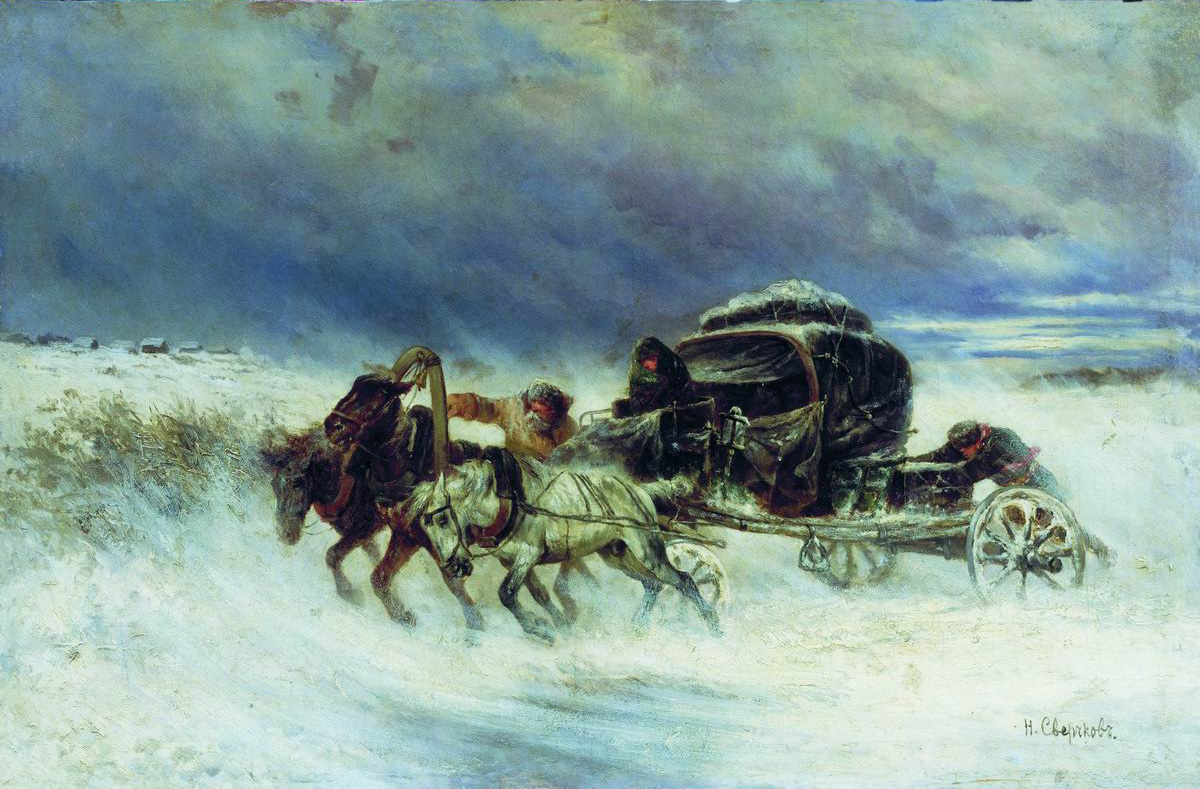
Caught in the storm, painting by Nicolas Swertschkoff (1950)

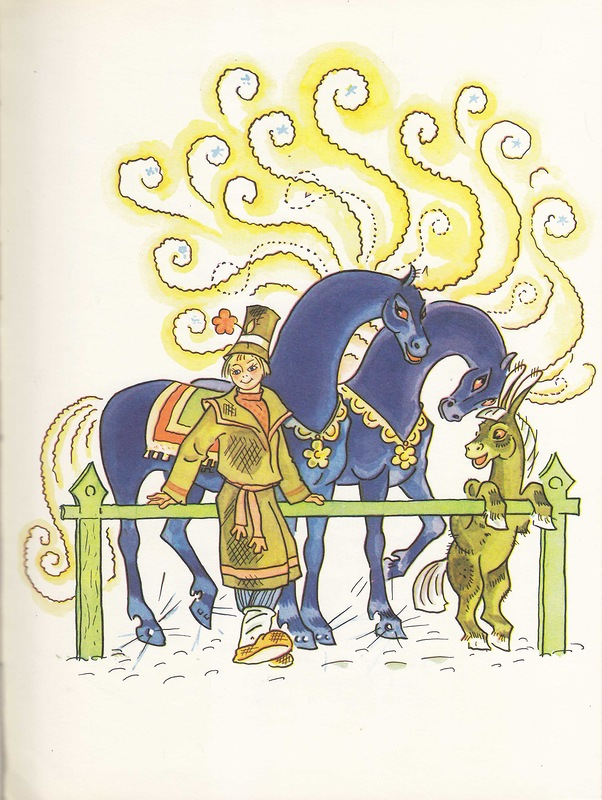
Drawing from the tale "The Little Humpbacked Horse"

== See also ==
- List of Russian horse breeds

== Bibliography ==
- Horace Hayes, Matthew (1900). Among Horses in Russia. R. A. Everett.
- Igor Bobilev (1977), Le grand livre du cheval en Russie (in French), translated by Nina de Spengler, La bibliothèque des Arts, ASIN B0014LVT3Q, Wikidata Q57933003
- Ferret, Carole (2009). Une civilisation du cheval (in French). Paris: Belin. ISBN 978-2-7011-4819-9.
- Gouraud, Jean-Louis; Prat, Thierry (2001). Russie, des chevaux, des hommes & des saints (in French). Paris: Belin. ISBN 2-7011-3019-0.
- Hendricks, Bonnie Lou (2007). International Encyclopedia of Horse Breeds. University of Oklahoma Press. ISBN 978-0-8061-3884-8.
