= 1871 in art =

Events from the year 1871 in art.

== Events ==
- March – Edward Lear settles at his villa in Sanremo.
- Spring – James McNeill Whistler publishes Sixteen etchings of scenes on the Thames and paints his first "moonlights" (later called "nocturnes") of the river.
- March 18–May 28 – Paris Commune:
  - April 5 – Federation of Artists, organized by Gustave Courbet, holds its first meeting in Paris. Membership includes Jules Dalou, Honoré Daumier, André Gill and Eugène Pottier; Jean-Baptiste-Camille Corot and Édouard Manet are also members but do not actively participate.
  - May 16 – Napoleonic column in the Place Vendôme is pulled down according to a suggestion by Courbet, one of the events photographed by Bruno Braquehais.
  - May – André-Adolphe-Eugène Disdéri photographs dead Communards.
  - c. May – James Tissot flees Paris for London.
- June 14 – Camille Pissarro marries his mistress Julie Vellay in the London borough of Croydon and moves to Pontoise.
- August 14 – Courbet is sentenced to 6 months imprisonment and a fine for his participation in the Paris Commune; during his time in prison he produces a series of still life paintings of fruit and flowers.
- Summer – Claude Monet visits Zaandam.
- December – Monet and his wife Camille move to Argenteuil.
- William Morris and Dante Gabriel Rossetti become tenants of Kelmscott Manor, which they share with Jane Morris.
- Marie Spartali marries William James Stillman.
- Edwin B. Crocker establishes the Crocker Art Museum in Sacramento, California.

== Works ==
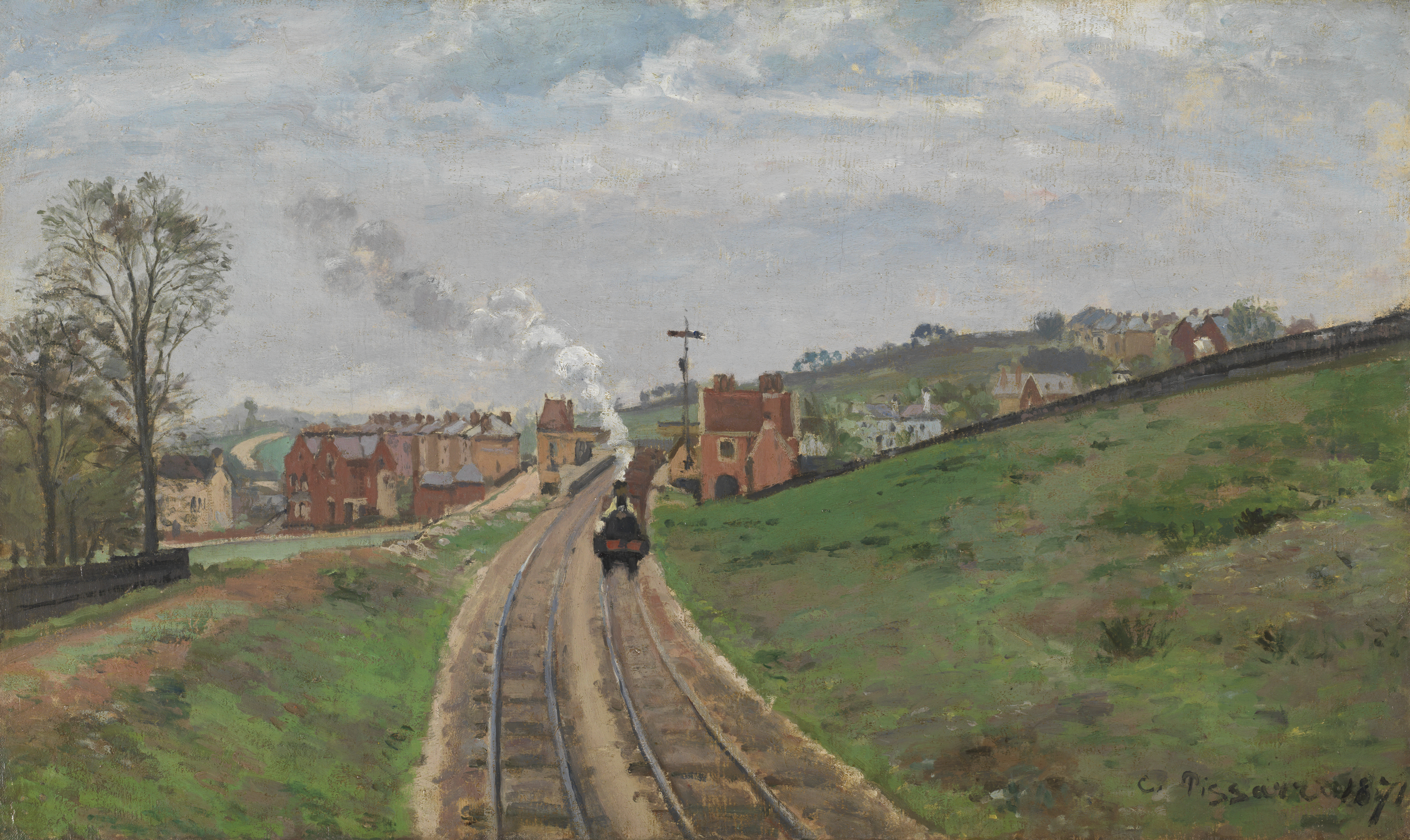
Lordship Lane Station, Dulwich by Camille Pissarro

Whistler's Mother

- Frederic Edwin Church – The Parthenon
- Antonio Ciseri – Ecce Homo
- Confederate Monument (Liberty, Mississippi)
- Edgar Degas – Count Lepic and His Daughters
- Friedrich Drake – Statue of Alexander von Humboldt (Philadelphia)
- Thomas Eakins – Max Schmitt in a Single Scull
- Armand Guillaumin – View of the Seine, Paris
- Martin Johnson Heade – Cattleya Orchid and Three Hummingbirds
- Frank Holl – No Tidings from the Sea
- Daniel Huntington – The Narrows, Lake George
- Eastman Johnson – The Old Stagecoach
- Ivan Kramskoi – The Mermaids
- Édouard Manet
  - The Harbour at Bordeaux (E.G. Bührle collection, Zürich)
  - The Barricade (Civil War) (Museum of Fine Arts (Budapest))
- John Everett Millais
  - The Martyr of the Solway
  - Victory O Lord!
- Claude Monet
  - Hyde Park
  - A Windmill at Zaandam
- Albert Joseph Moore – Sea Gulls
- Camille Pissarro
  - The Avenue, Sydenham
  - Lordship Lane Station, Dulwich
- Vinnie Ream – Abraham Lincoln (marble, United States Capitol rotunda, Washington, D.C.)
- Randolph Rogers – Statue of Abraham Lincoln (bronze, Philadelphia)
- Dante Gabriel Rossetti
  - Dante's Dream
  - Pandora
- Amanda Sidwall – Self-portrait
- George Blackall Simonds – The Falconer sculpture
- James Tissot – The Farewells
- Vasily Vereshchagin
  - At the city wall: "Let them in!"
  - The Apotheosis of War
- Heinrich von Angeli – Crown Princess Victoria of Prussia
- George Frederic Watts – Portrait of Frederic Leighton
- Alfred Waud – A Home on the Mississippi
- James McNeill Whistler
  - Arrangement in Grey and Black No.1 ("Whistler's Mother")
  - Nocturne: Blue and Silver – Chelsea
  - Symphony in Grey: Early Morning, Thames
  - Variations in Pink And Grey – Chelsea
  - Variations in Violet and Green – Chelsea

== Births ==
- January 27 – Samuel Peploe, Scottish painter (died 1935)
- March 2 – Albert Herter, American painter (died 1950)
- March 9 – Granville Redmond, American painter (died 1935)
- April 11 – Theodor Pallady, Romanian painter (died 1956)
- May ? – Elinor Darwin, née Monsell, Irish-born engraver and portrait painter (died 1954)
- May 1 – Miklós Ligeti, Hungarian sculptor (died 1944)
- May 11 – Mariano Fortuny, Spanish-born fashion designer (died 1949)
- May 27 – Georges Rouault, French Expressionist painter and stained glass artist (died 1958)
- June 12 – Victor David Brenner, Lithuanian-born American medalist, sculptor and engraver (died 1924)
- July 24 – Giacomo Balla, Italian painter (died 1958)
- August 22 – Émile André, French architect and designer (died 1933)
- October 26 – Guillermo Kahlo, German-born photographer (died 1941)
- date unknown – Peter Moog, German outsider artist (died 1930)

== Deaths ==
- January 1 – Alexander Munro, Scottish-born Pre-Raphaelite sculptor (born 1825)
- January 14 – Eduardo Zamacois y Zabala, Spanish painter (born 1841)
- January 18 – Sir George Hayter, English painter, specialising in portraits (born 1792)
- January 19 – Henri Regnault, French painter (born 1843)
- February 8 – Moritz von Schwind, Austrian painter (born 1804)
- February 20 – Paul Kane, Irish-Canadian painter (born 1810)
- February 26 – Sophia Hawthorne, American painter and illustrator (born 1809)
- March 3 – Michael Thonet, German-Austrian furniture designer (born 1796)
- March – Emma Fürstenhoff, Swedish florist (born 1802)
- April 6 – Emma Eleonora Kendrick, English miniature painter (born 1788)
- April 24 – Karl Girardet, French painter (born 1813)
- June 9 – Anna Atkins, English botanist and pioneer photographer (born 1799)
- June 19 – Johann Fischbach, Austrian painter of landscapes and genre arts (born 1797)
- July 30 – Edwin Wilkins Field, English lawyer and painter (born 1804)
- October 14 – Johan Frederik Møller, Danish painter and photographer (born 1797)
- December 9 – Josef Mánes, Czech painter (born 1820)
- December 21 – Paul Guigou, French painter (born 1834)
