= Portrait of an Unknown Woman =

1883 painting by Ivan Kramskoi

- Неизвестная (Russian)
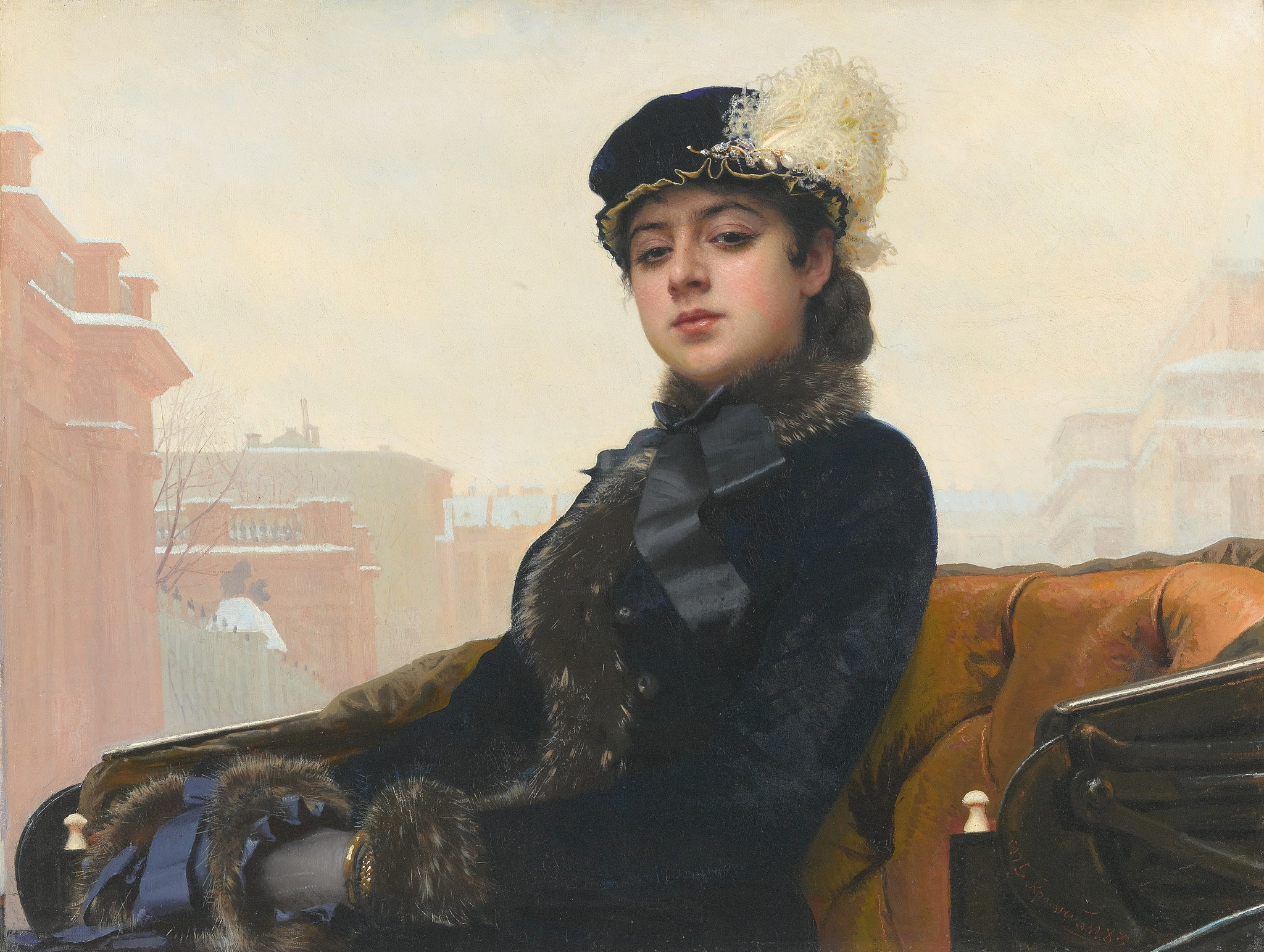
- Artist: Ivan Kramskoi
- Year: 1883
- Medium: Oil on canvas
- Dimensions: 75.5 cm × 99 cm (29.7 in × 39 in)
- Location: Tretyakov Gallery, Moscow
- Owner: Pavel Tretyakov
- Website: tretyakov.ru/...8396

Portrait of an Unknown Woman, also known as The Unknown Woman, An Unknown Lady or Stranger (Russian: Неизвестная, romanized: Neizvestnaya) is an oil painting by the Russian artist Ivan Kramskoi, painted in 1883. The model, whose identity is unknown, is a woman of "quiet strength and forthright gaze". It is one of Russia's best-known artworks, although a number of critics were indignant when the painting was first exhibited and condemned what they saw as a depiction of a haughty and immoral woman. Its popularity has grown with changes in public taste.

The painting hangs in the Tretyakov Gallery, Moscow, while an earlier version, also dated 1883, is housed at the Kunsthalle Kiel.

== Description and reception ==
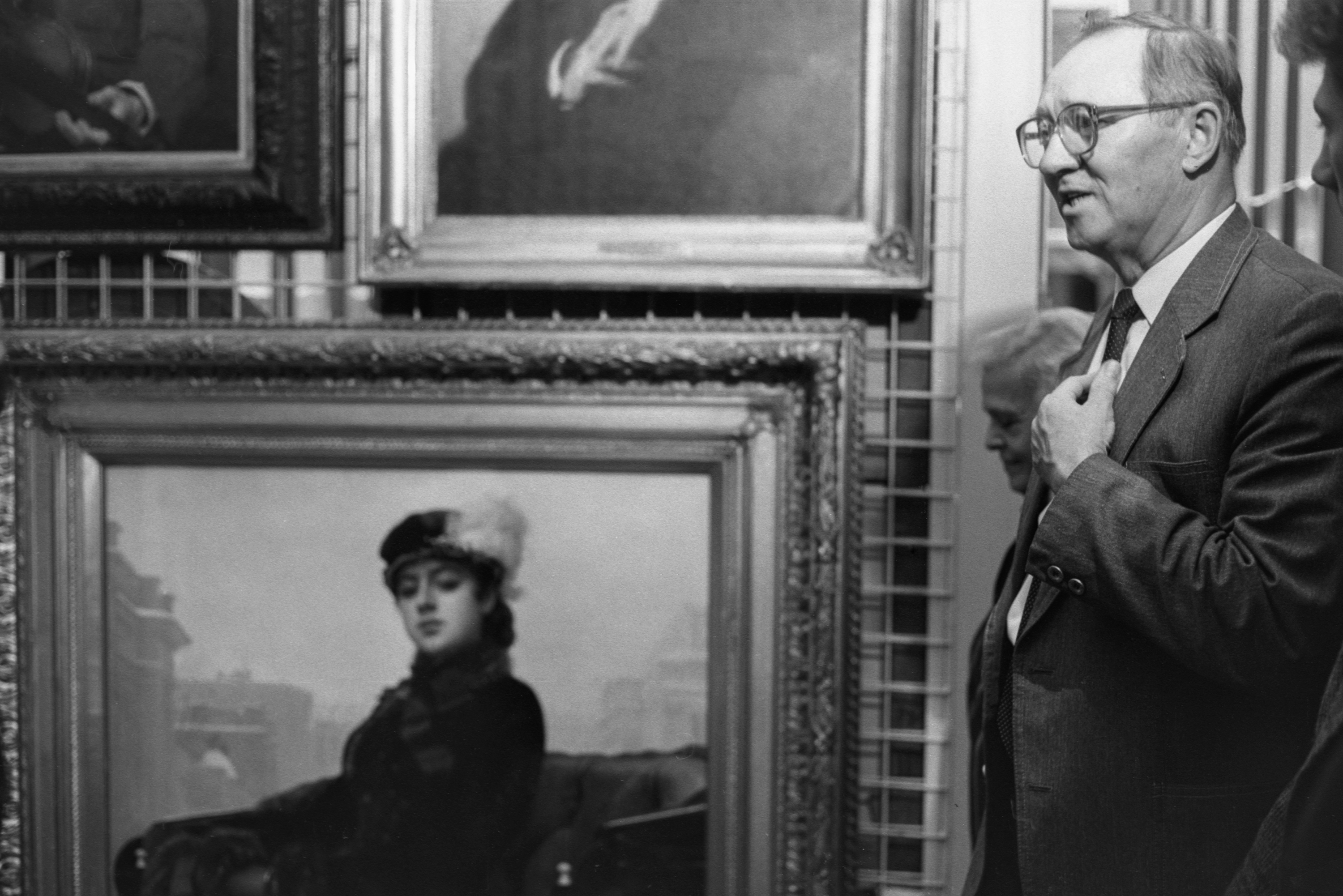
Yuri Korolev, Director of the Tretyakov Gallery, presents a painting in storage during the reconstruction of the gallery's main building, August 1991

Portrait of an Unknown Woman combines elements of the genre and portrait traditions in art. She is dressed in a black fur and velvet coat, fur hat, with leather gloves. The woman is seated on an open carriage at the Anichkov Bridge in Saint Petersburg. The woman's identity has not been established by art historians. Kramskoi titled the painting Unknown and did not mention her in any of his letters or diaries, leading to much speculation and contributing to the painting's highly enigmatic reputation.

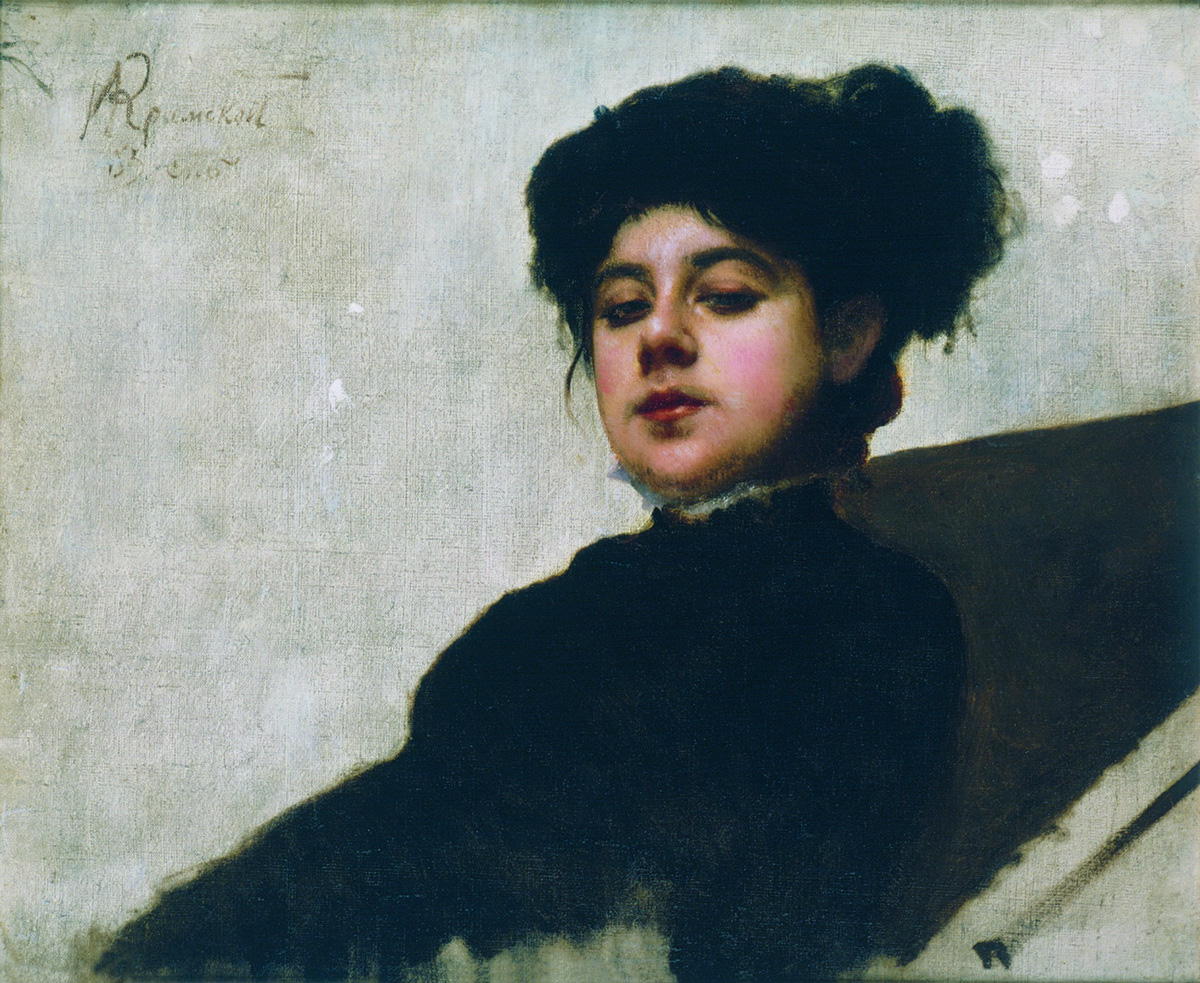
Preparatory study

The portrait was painted late in Kramskoi's life. He had begun his career as a rebel working outside of the establishment and was early on expelled from the Russian Academy. By 1883, he was at the height of his fame and reputation and working at the highest level of patronage, producing portraits of Czar Alexander III and his wife Maria Feodorovna. He was also one of the founders and leaders of The Wanderers.

However, Portrait of an Unknown Woman caused a sensation when first exhibited, more as a result of the subject matter than the aesthetics of the work. A number of critics presumed that the woman was a prostitute. One critic described the painting as a portrayal of "a coquette in a carriage", while another wrote of "a provocatively beautiful woman, all in velvet and fur, throwing you a sneeringly sensuous glance from a luxurious carriage – is this not one of the effluvia of big cities that allow contemptible women dressed in outfits purchased for the price of their female chastity onto the streets". Kramskoi remarked, "Some people have said it is not known who this woman is. Is she decent, or does she sell herself? But within her is an entire epoch."

Pavel Tretyakov refused to buy the painting for the Tretyakov. However, the painting's popularity quickly grew, in part as the beauty of sin became a popular theme with the following generation of Russian artists. It has been described as "unusually bright, densely painted, and relaxed. Kramskoi clearly tried to shine with his outstanding painterly mastery."

The painting has been used as the cover for some editions of Leo Tolstoy's Anna Karenina. In 2008, the Guggenheim curator Valerie Hillings observed that "many people just think she's sort of like Anna Karenina. She has that kind of special feel, that special Russianness".

== Sources ==
- Wachtel, Andrew. Plays of Expectations. University of Washington Press, 2007. 58. ISBN 0-295-98647-6
