= Self-Portrait (Kramskoi) =

Painting by Ivan Kramskoi

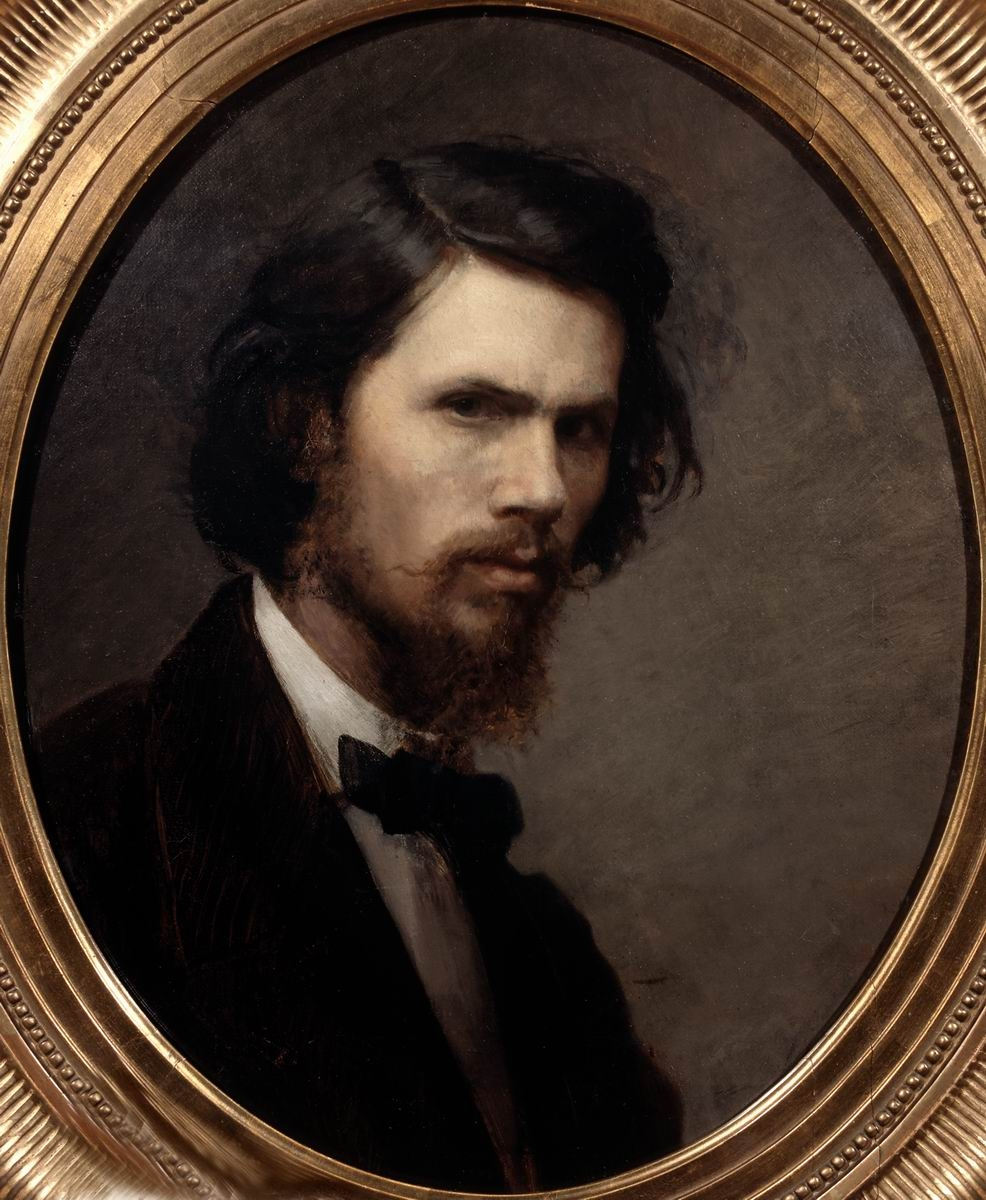
Self-Portrait (1867), 52.7 cm × 44 cm. Tretyakov Gallery, Moscow

Self-Portrait is an oil-on-canvas painting of 1867 by the Russian artist Ivan Kramskoi. Oval in shape, it is a self-evaluation: Kramskoi indicates how he sees his own facial features and his relationship with the world around him. Then 30 years old, the artist renders himself formally dressed, handsome and intelligent-looking. His pose causes him to be gaze down on the viewer, with an appearance that is, according to the Tretyakov Gallery, "severe and demanding".

The painter Ilya Repin wrote of the work, "What eyes! You can’t hide from them. They are small and are sunk deep in their orbits; gray, lit up…What a serious face!"

== Sources ==
- Sarabianov, Dmitri V. Russian Art: From Neoclassism to the Avant Garde 1800-1917 : Painting Sculpture Architecture. Harry N Abrams, 1990. ISBN 978-0-8109-3750-5
