= Christ in the Desert =

Painting by Ivan Kramskoi

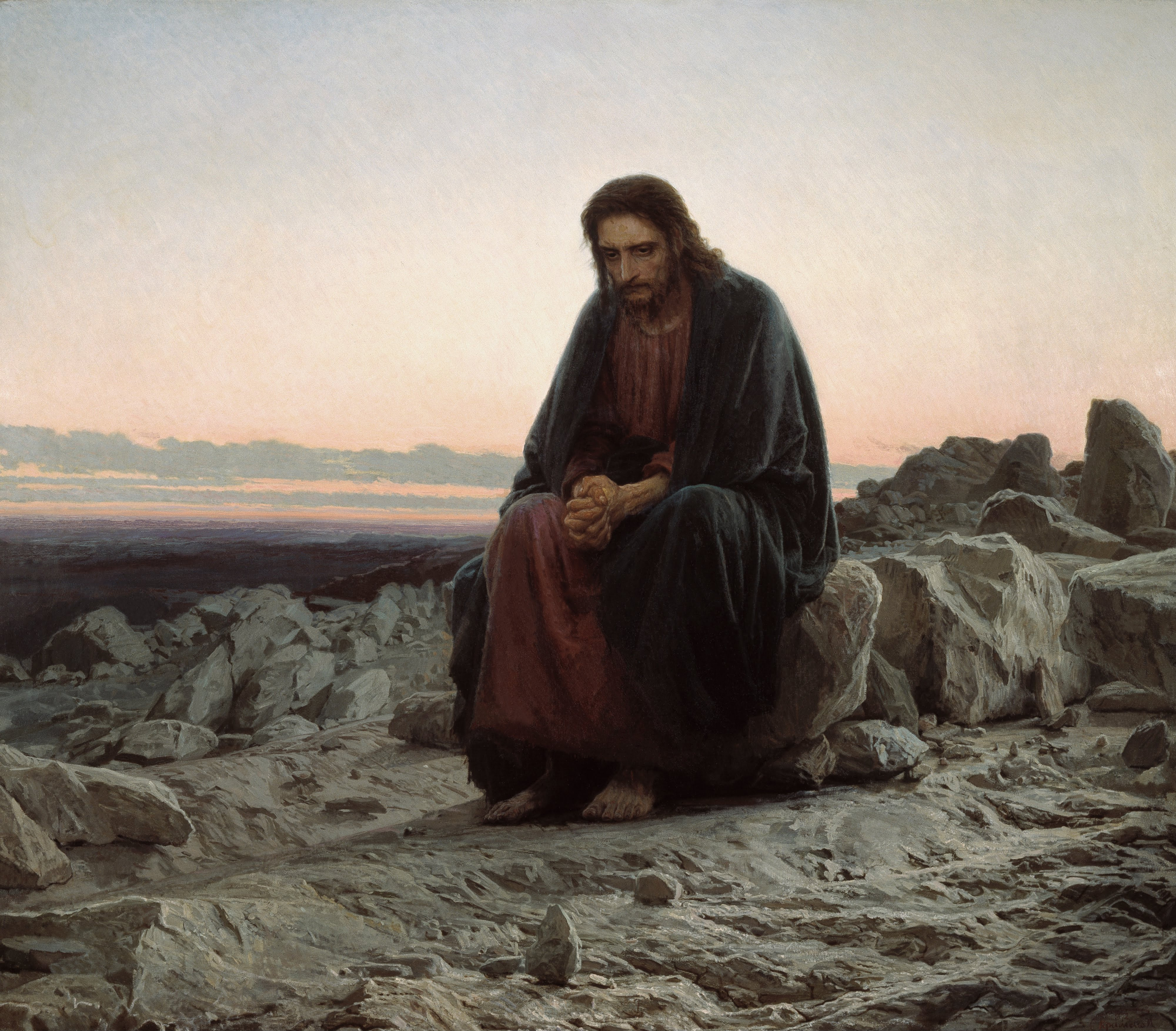
- Artist: Ivan Kramskoi
- Year: 1872
- Medium: Oil on canvas
- Dimensions: 184 cm × 214 cm (72 in × 84 in)
- Location: Tretyakov Gallery; Moscow

Christ in the Desert or Christ in the Wilderness (Russian: Христос в пустыне, romanized: Khristos v pustyne) is an 1872 painting by Russian artist Ivan Kramskoi, reflecting the temptation of Christ. Kramskoi was offered a professorship for the painting by the Russian Academy of Arts Council but rejected it in the beginning of 1873. He had been expelled from the Academy earlier, and chose to keep his "youthful commitment to independence from the Academy". Subsequently, it became one of the favourite paintings of Pavel Tretyakov, who bought it for his gallery in the year the painting was finished.

== History ==
The theme of Christ's temptation had attracted Kramskoi already in the early 1860s. In that period he made the first sketch of the composition. The first version of Christ in the Desert is dated to 1867, but turned out to be unsuccessful. Kramskoi realized that the choice of vertical format was inappropriate. He opted for the horizontal format and introduced the pallid rocky desert in the background.

Kramskoi described the early history of the painting in his letters to writer Vsevolod Garshin.

== The painting ==
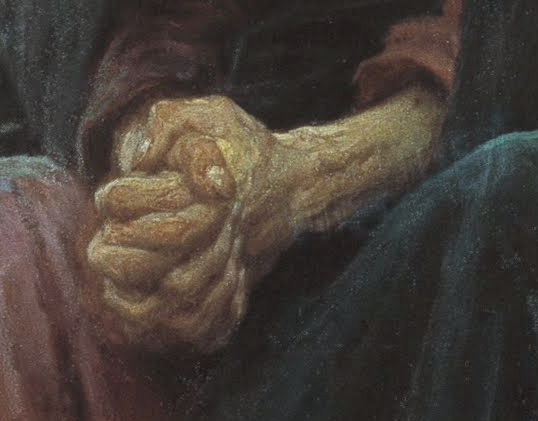
Jesus' clasped hands as pictured in the painting

Christ in the Desert is one of Kramskoi's Jesus-themed paintings, the other being Rejoice, King of the Jews and Herodias. Kramskoi used primarily cold colours to reflect the chill dawn in the background. The thoughtful figure of Christ, wearing a dark wrap and a red tunic underneath, is slightly shifted to the right of centre. Kramskoi wrote: "To the question 'this is not Christ, how do you know he looked like that?', I permitted myself to reply 'but even the actual, living Christ has not been recognised'." The painting emphasizes Jesus's human constituent of hypostatic union and features a mind in struggle instead of action. Because the horizon divides the canvas plane almost in half, the figure of Jesus dominates the painting space and harmonizes with the stern wilderness simultaneously.

Ivan Kramskoi sold his work to Tretyakov for 6,000 rubles.

== Reception ==
The painting received a wide feedback and appeared at the Peredvizhniks' second exposition of 1873. Pavel Tretyakov wrote: "I liked Kramskoi's Saviour very much... that's why I was harrying up to purchase him, but many people did not appreciate him much and the others did not at all. In my opinion this is the best painting in our school recently; maybe I am mistaken". Critic Vladimir Stasov noted that a "sorrowful note sensibly resounds in the general physiological array of the work". Vsevolod Garshin outlined the "expression of immense moral force, hatred against evil and complete resoluteness to fight it". According to Ivan Goncharov, who wrote "Christ in the Desert. A Painting of Mr. Kramskoi" (original Russian title: "Христос в пустыне». Картина г. Крамского"), "the entire figure seems to have diminished a bit from its natural size, contracted, not from starvation, thirst and bad weather, but from internal, inhuman insight to his thought and will during the struggle of forces of spirit and flesh". He also emphasized that "there is nothing festive, heroic, victorious — the future fate of the world and of all livings is concealed in that miserable, small being, in pauper appearance, under the rags, in humble simplicity, inseparable with true majesty and force". The Russian art researcher Georgy Wagner wrote the article "On the Interpretation of I. N. Kramskoi's Painting "Christ in the Desert" (Russian: "Об истолковании картины И.Н. Крамского "Христос в пустыне").
