= Lordship Lane Station, Dulwich =

Painting by Camille Pissarro

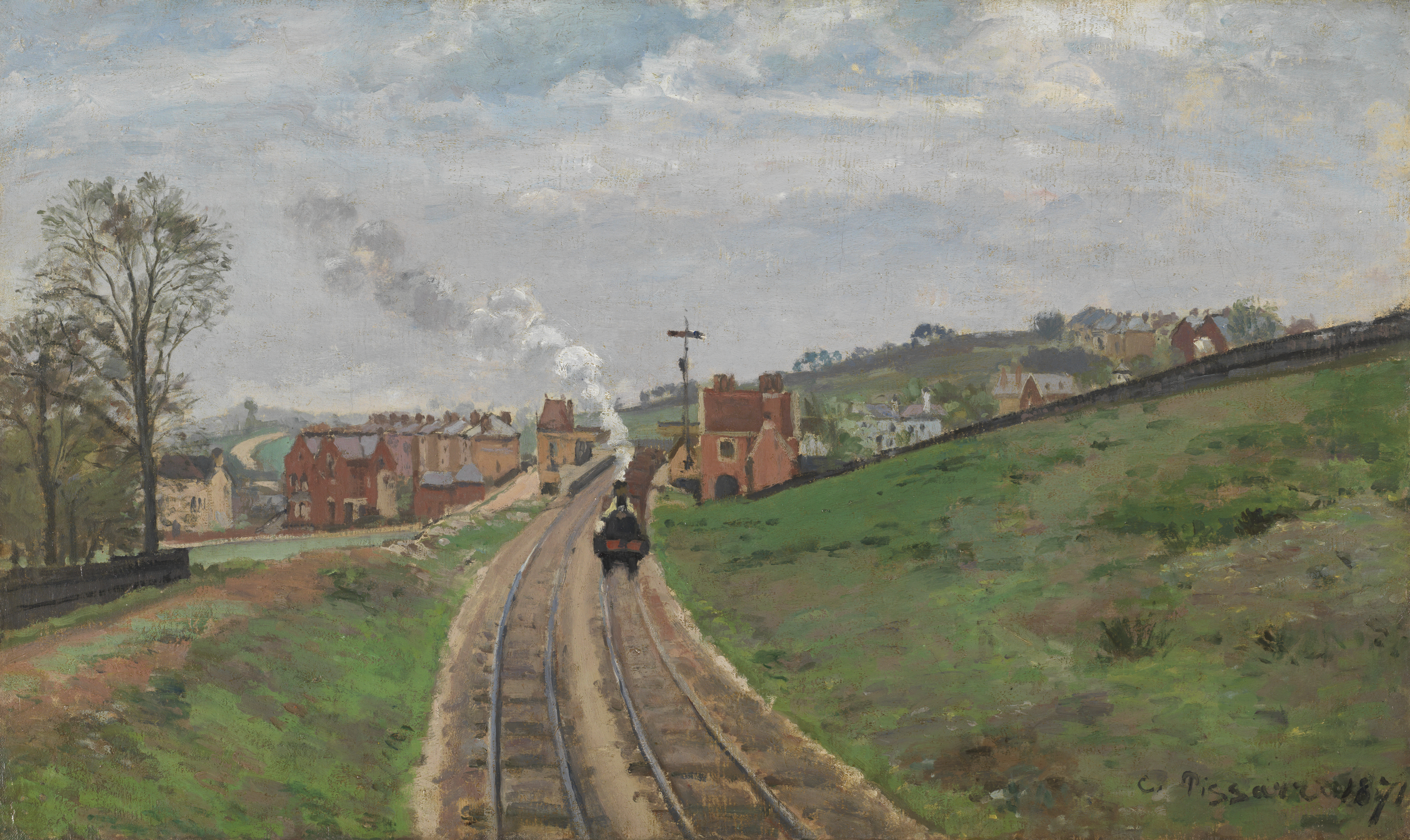
- Artist: Camille Pissarro
- Year: 1871
- Medium: Oil on canvas
- Dimensions: 44.5 cm × 72.5 cm (17.5 in × 28.5 in)
- Location: Courtauld Gallery, London

Lordship Lane Station, Dulwich is an 1871 landscape painting by the French artist Camille Pissarro. It depicts a view of Lordship Lane railway station in East Dulwich, which had opened six years earlier. Pissarro, a noted impressionist, was in London following the outbreak of the Franco Prussian War. The work may have been inspired by J.M.W. Turner's 1844 Rain, Steam and Speed – The Great Western Railway, which was on display at the National Gallery during Pissaro's stay in London.

Today the painting is in the Courtauld Gallery, having been acquired in 1948.

== See also ==
- List of paintings by Camille Pissarro

== Bibliography ==
- Rothkopf, Katherine. Pissaro: Creating the Impressionist Landscape. Baltimore Museum of Art, 2006.
- Rubin, James H. Impressionism and the Modern Landscape: Productivity, Technology, and Urbanization from Manet to Van Gogh. University of California Press, 2008.
