= View of the Seine, Paris =

Painting by Armand Guillaumin

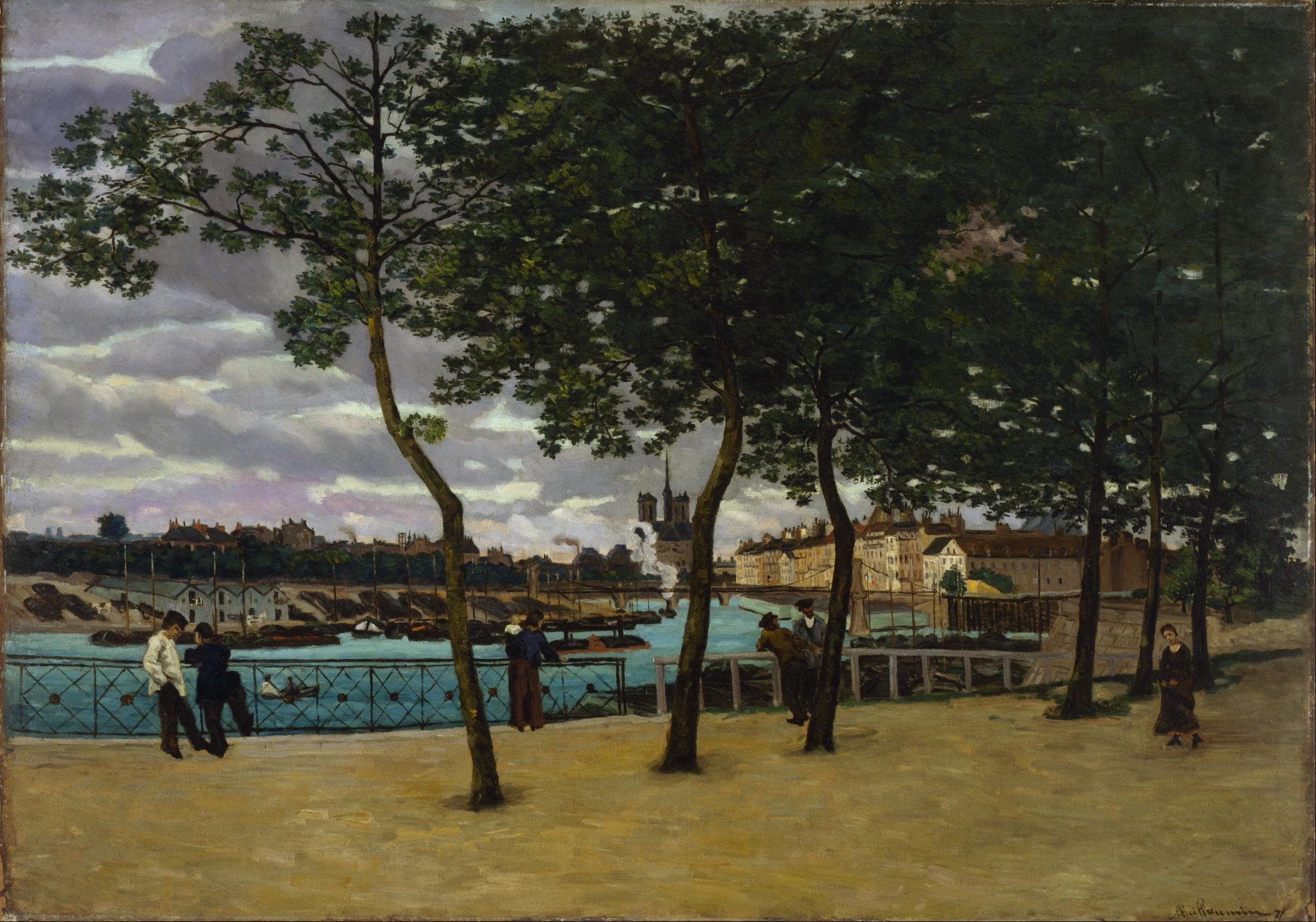
- Artist: Armand Guillaumin
- Year: 1871
- Medium: Oil on canvas, landscape painting
- Dimensions: 126.4 cm × 181.3 cm (49.8 in × 71.4 in)
- Location: Museum of Fine Arts, Houston

View of the Seine, Paris is an 1871 oil painting by the French artist Armand Guillaumin. A cityscape it depicts a view of the River Seine from the Quai Henri-IV looking towards Notre-Dame de Paris. It was produced in the months after the Franco-Prussian War and defeat of the Paris Commune. The painting was displayed at the First Impressionist Exhibition of 1874. It did not initially sell and remained in his studio for several years. Paul Cézanne used it as the backdrop of his first self-portrait which he produced in 1875. Today it forms part of the collection of the Museum of Fine Arts, Houston in Texas.

== Bibliography ==
- Elderfield, John (ed.) Cézanne Portraits. Princeton University Press, 2017.
- Woodson-Boulton, Amy (ed.) Visions of the Industrial Age, 1830-1914: Modernity and the Anxiety of Representation in Europe. Taylor & Francis, 2017.
