= Ivan Kramskoi =

Russian painter (1837–1887)

- Иван Крамской
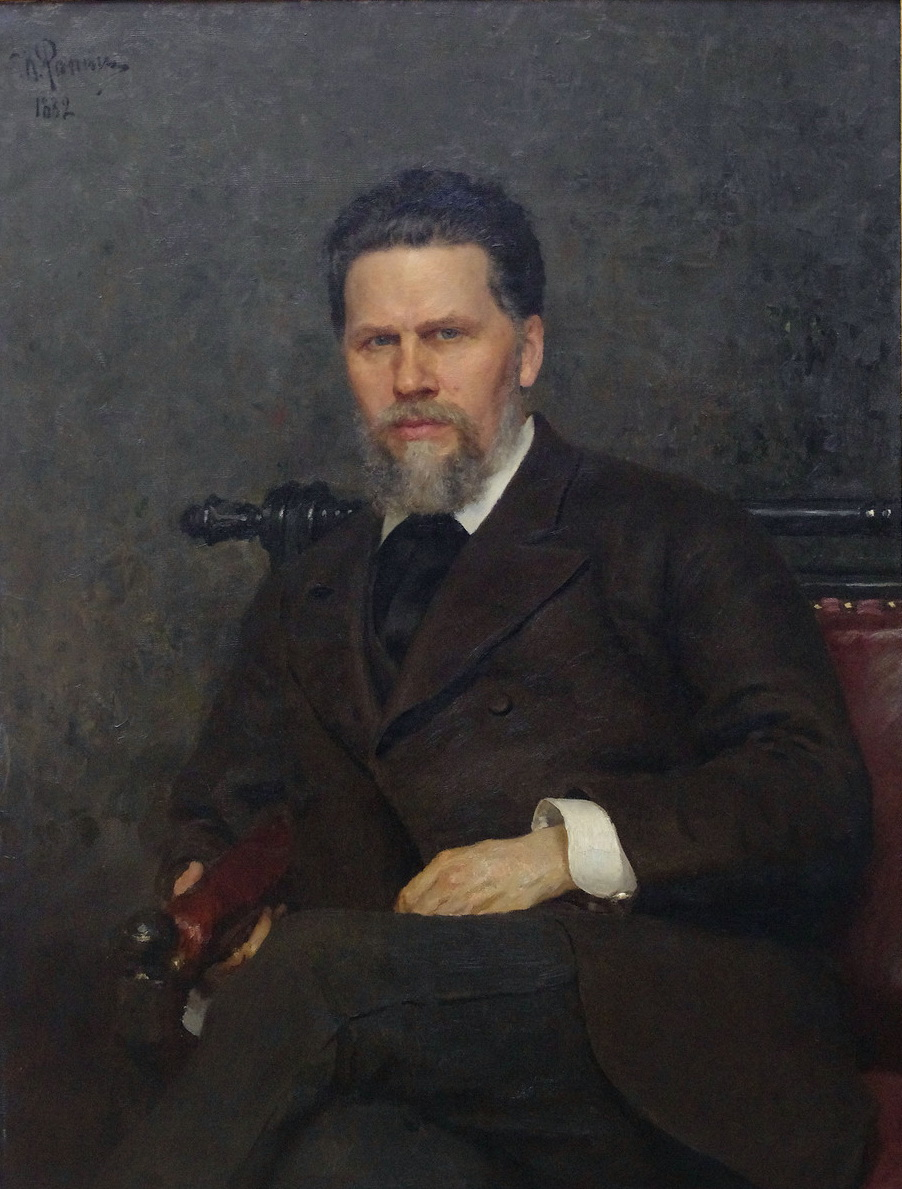
- Portrait by Ilya Repin, Tretyakov Gallery, Moscow (1882)
- Born: 27 May [O.S. 15 May] 1837; Ostrogozhsk, Voronezh Governorate, Russia
- Died: 5 April 1887 (aged 49); St. Petersburg, Russia
- Resting place: Tikhvin Cemetery, St. Petersburg
- Education: Mikhail Tulinov; Alexey Markov
- Notable work: The Mermaids (1871); Christ in the Desert (1872); Portrait of an Unknown Woman (1883)
- Movement: Realism, Peredvizhniki
- Spouse: Sophia Prokhorova (m. 1863)
- Children: seven, including Nikolai and Sophia
- Elected: Member Academy of Arts (1869)
- Patrons: Pavel Tretyakov

Ivan Nikolayevich Kramskoi (Note: Also spelled Kramskoy, as in Valkenier 1996.) (Russian: Иван Николаевич Крамской; 8 June [O.S. 27 May] 1837 – 5 April [O.S. 24 March] 1887) was a Russian Realist painter and art critic. One of the most prominent artisans during Tsar Alexander II's reign, he is remembered as co-founding member and public frontman of the Peredvizhniki movement.

== Life ==
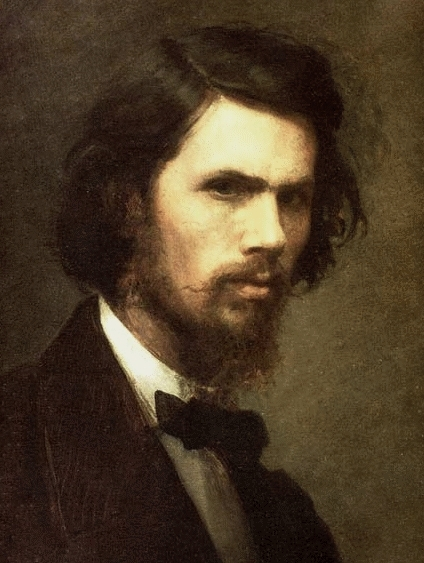
Self-Portrait, 1867

Kramskoi came from an impoverished petit-bourgeois family. From 1857 to 1863 he studied at the St. Petersburg Academy of Arts; he reacted against academic art and was an initiator of the "Revolt of the Fourteen" which ended with the expulsion from the Academy of a group of its graduates, who organized the Artel of Artists ("Артель художников").

Influenced by the ideas of the Russian revolutionary democrats, Kramskoi asserted the high public duty of the artist, principles of realism, and the moral substance and nationality of art. He became one of the main founders and ideologists of the Company of Itinerant Art Exhibitions (or Peredvizhniki). In 1863–1868, he taught at the drawing school of a society for the promotion of applied arts. In 1871, ten years after Taras Shevchenko's death, Kramskoi created a portrait of the poet that became widely popular. He created a gallery of portraits of important Russian writers, scientists, artists and public figures (Lev Nikolaevich Tolstoy, 1873, Ivan Shishkin, 1873, Pavel Mikhailovich Tretyakov, 1876, Mikhail Saltykov-Shchedrin, 1879, Sergei Botkin, 1880) in which expressive simplicity of composition and clarity of depiction emphasize profound psychological elements of character. Kramskoi's democratic ideals found their brightest expression in his portraits of peasants, which portrayed a wealth of character-details in representatives of the common people.

In one of Kramskoi's most well known paintings, Christ in the Desert (1872, Tretyakov gallery), he continued Alexander Ivanov's humanistic tradition by treating a religious subject in moral–philosophical terms. He imbued his image of Christ with dramatic experiences in a deeply psychological and vital interpretation, evoking the idea of his heroic self-sacrifice.

Aspiring to expand the ideological expressiveness of his images, Kramskoi created art that existed on the cusp of portraiture and genre-painting ("Nekrasov during the period of 'Last songs,'" 1877–78; "Unknown Woman," 1883; "Inconsolable grief," 1884; all in Tretyakov gallery). These paintings disclose their subjects' complex and sincere emotions, their personalities and fates. The orientation of Kramskoi's art, his acute critical judgments about it, and his persistent quest for objective public criteria for the evaluation of art exerted an essential influence on the development of realist art and aesthetics in Russia in the last third of the nineteenth century.

Kramskoi was considered an eccentric for giving his works to customers in expensive frames and not charging money for it. He died from an aortic aneurysm while working at his easel, aged only forty-nine.

== Gallery ==
Narrative paintings

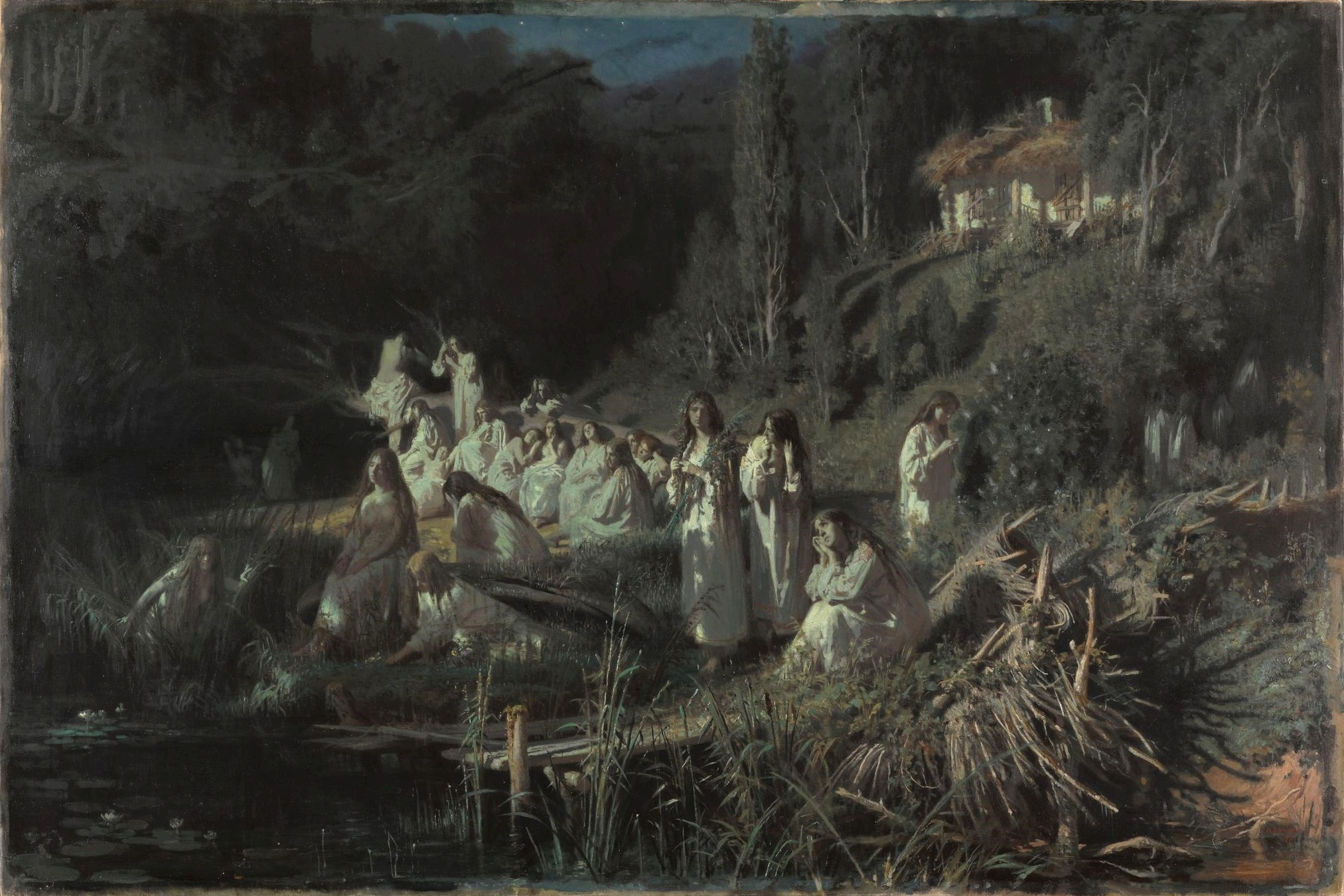
The Mermaids, 1871

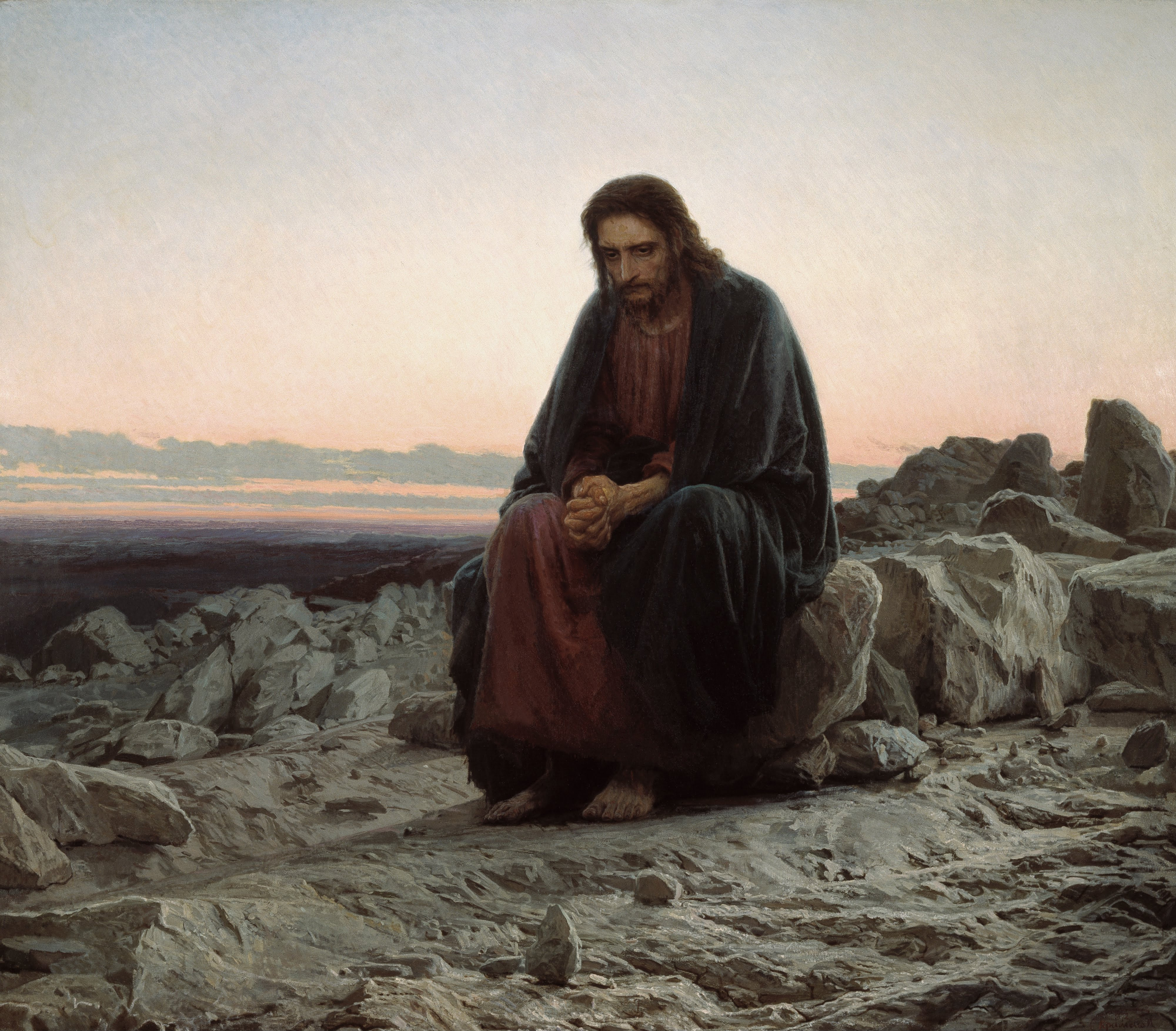
Christ in the Desert, 1872

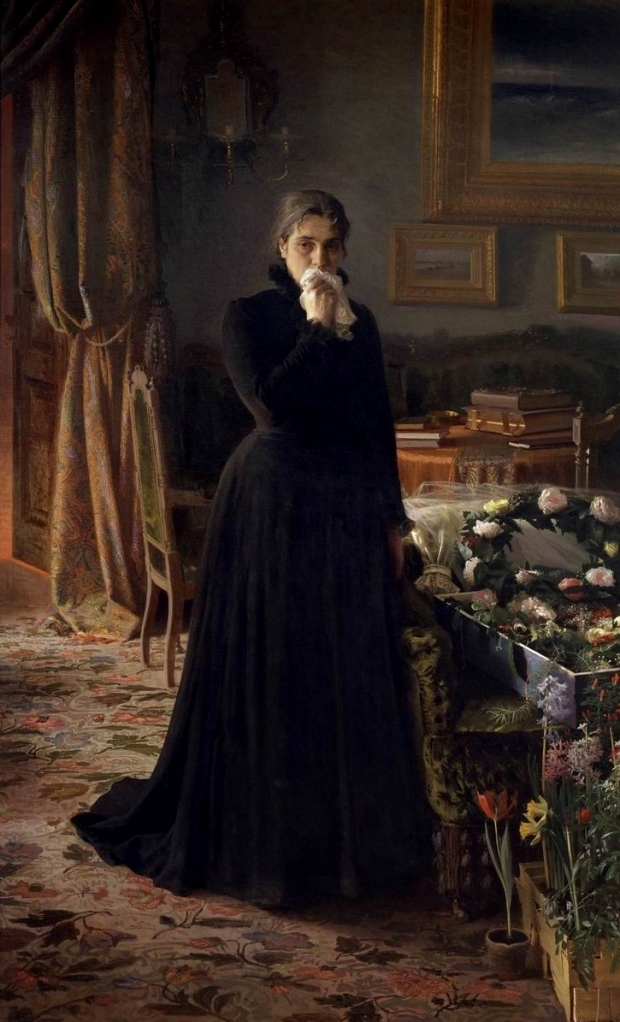
Inconsolable Grief, 1884
Portraits

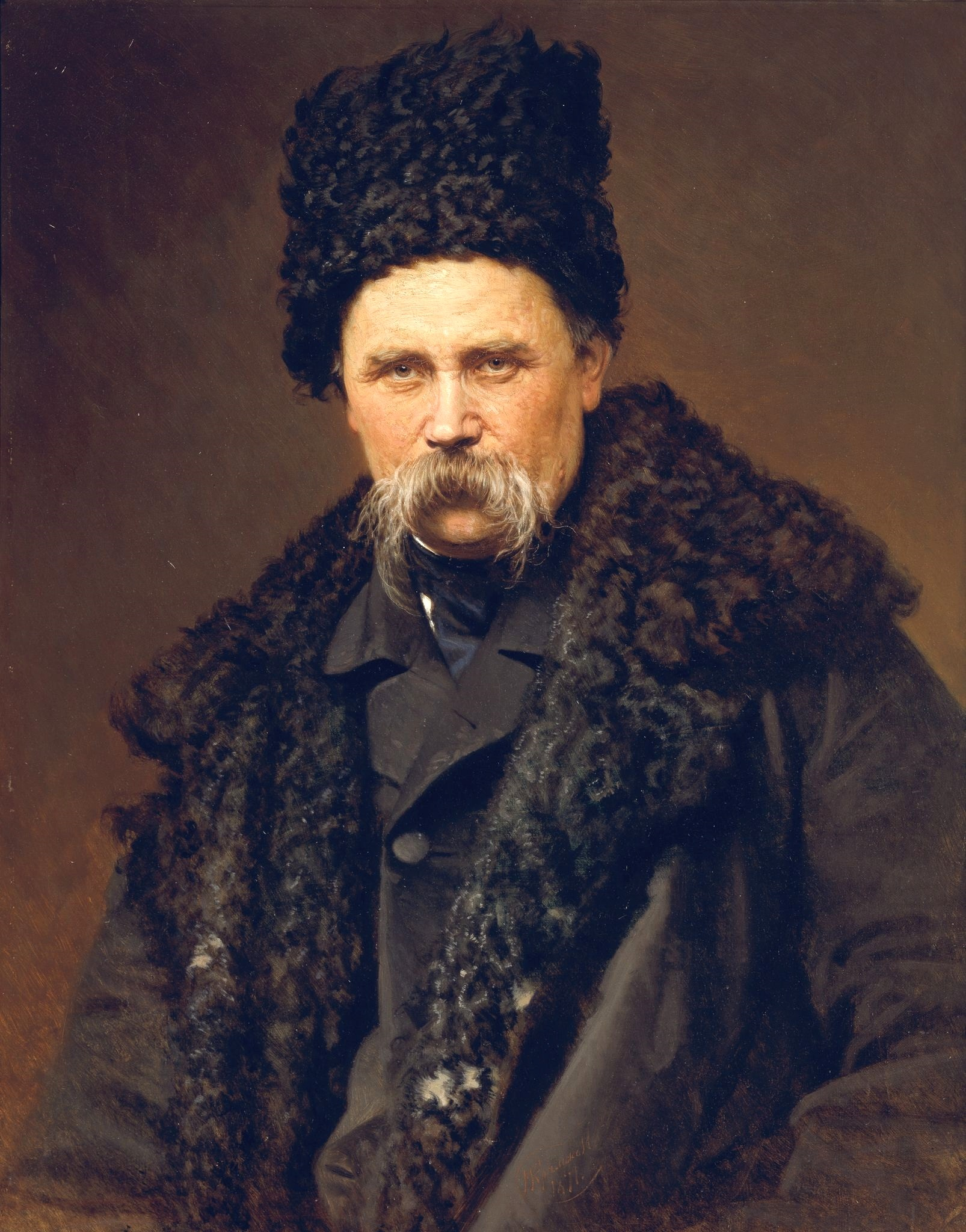
Taras Shevchenko, 1871, after the 1859 photograph by Andrey Denyer

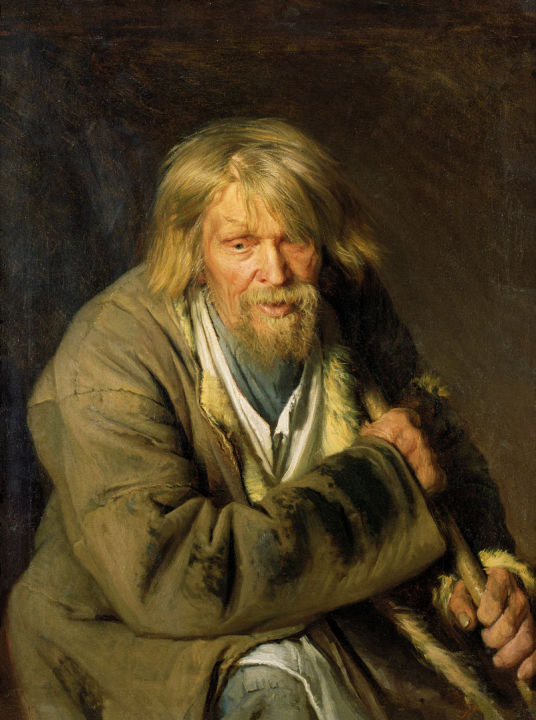
Old Man with a Crutch, 1872

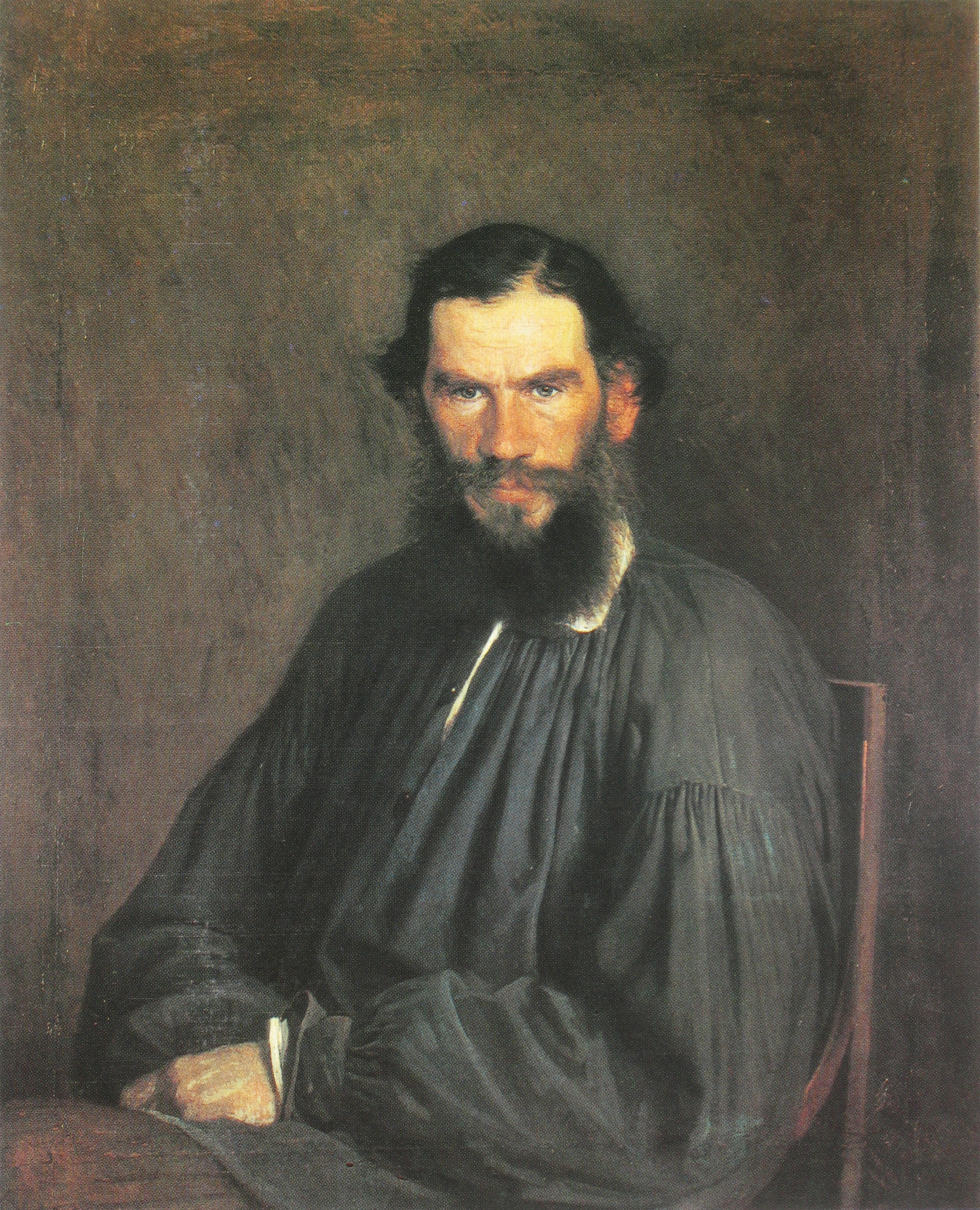
Leo Tolstoy, 1873

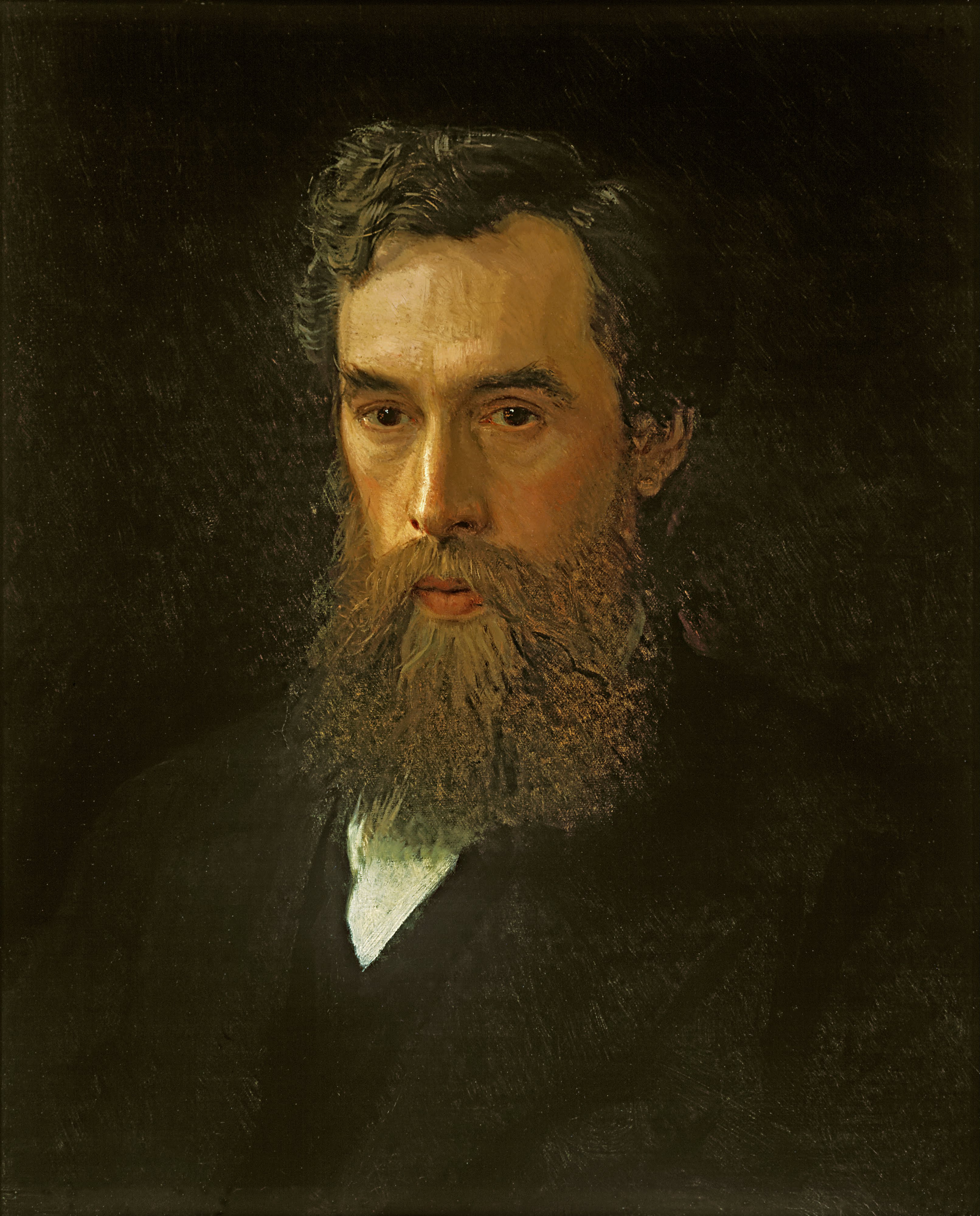
Pavel Tretyakov, 1876

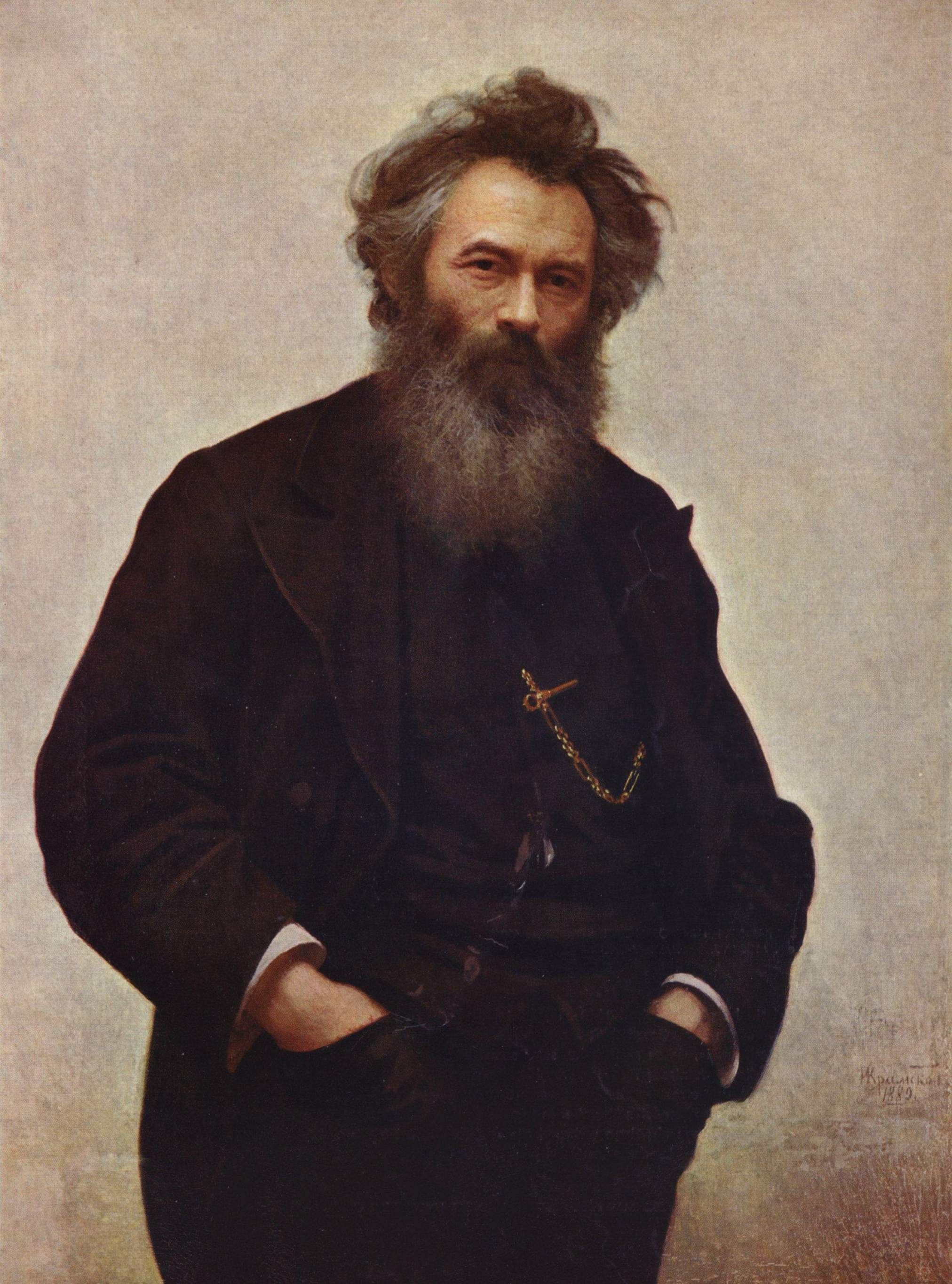
Ivan Shishkin, 1880

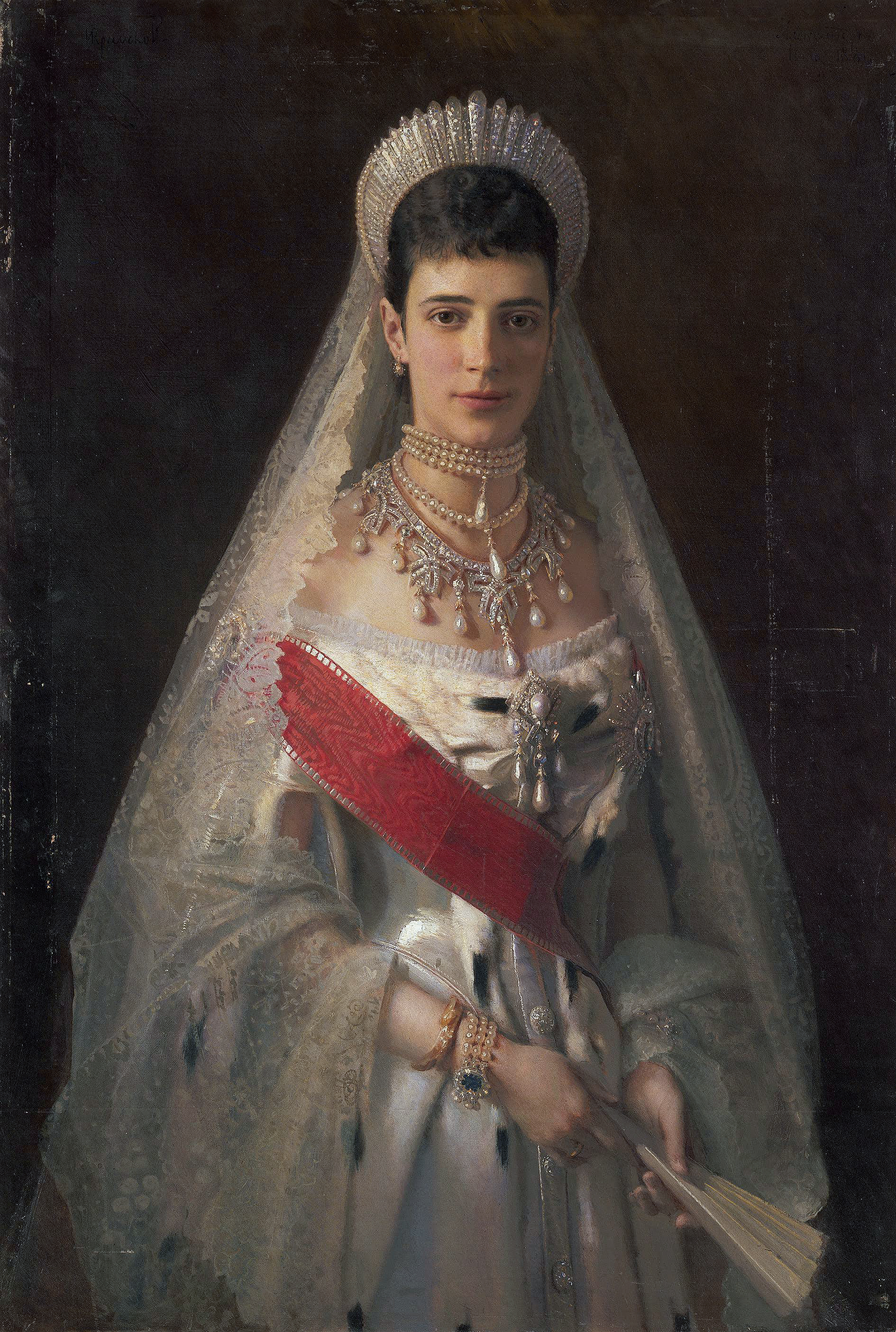
Empress Maria Feodorovna, 1880s

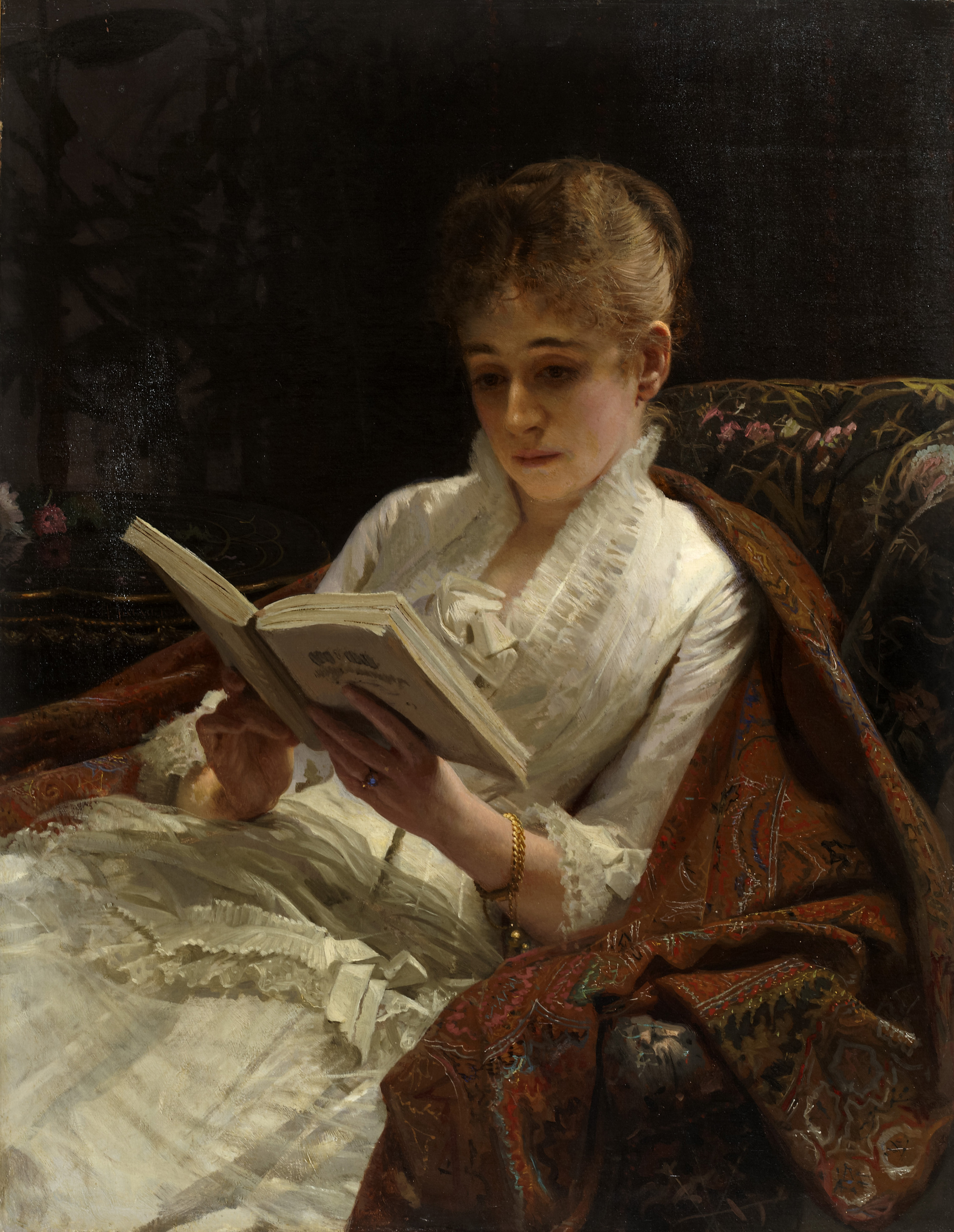
The Reading, 1881

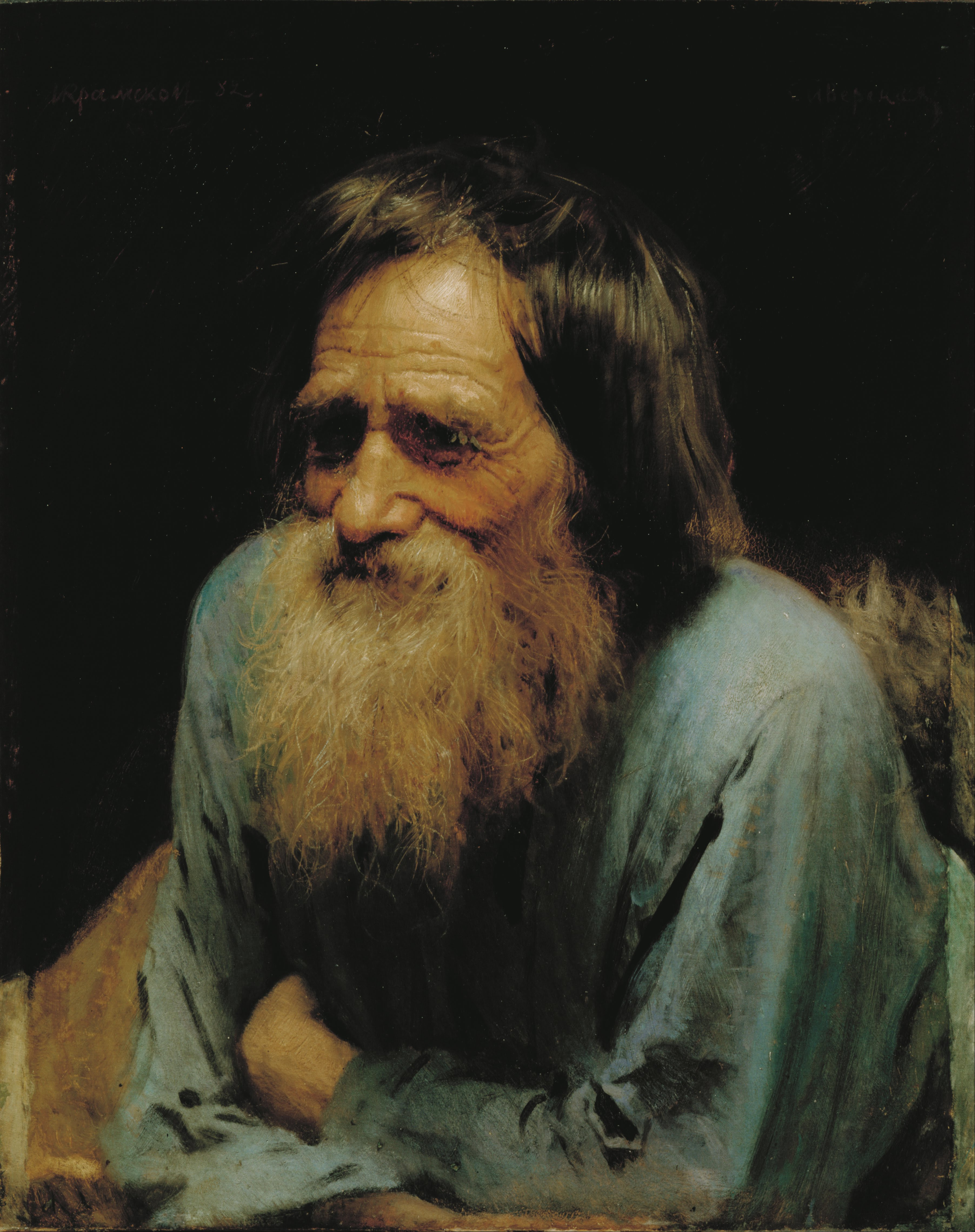
Mina Moiseyev, 1882

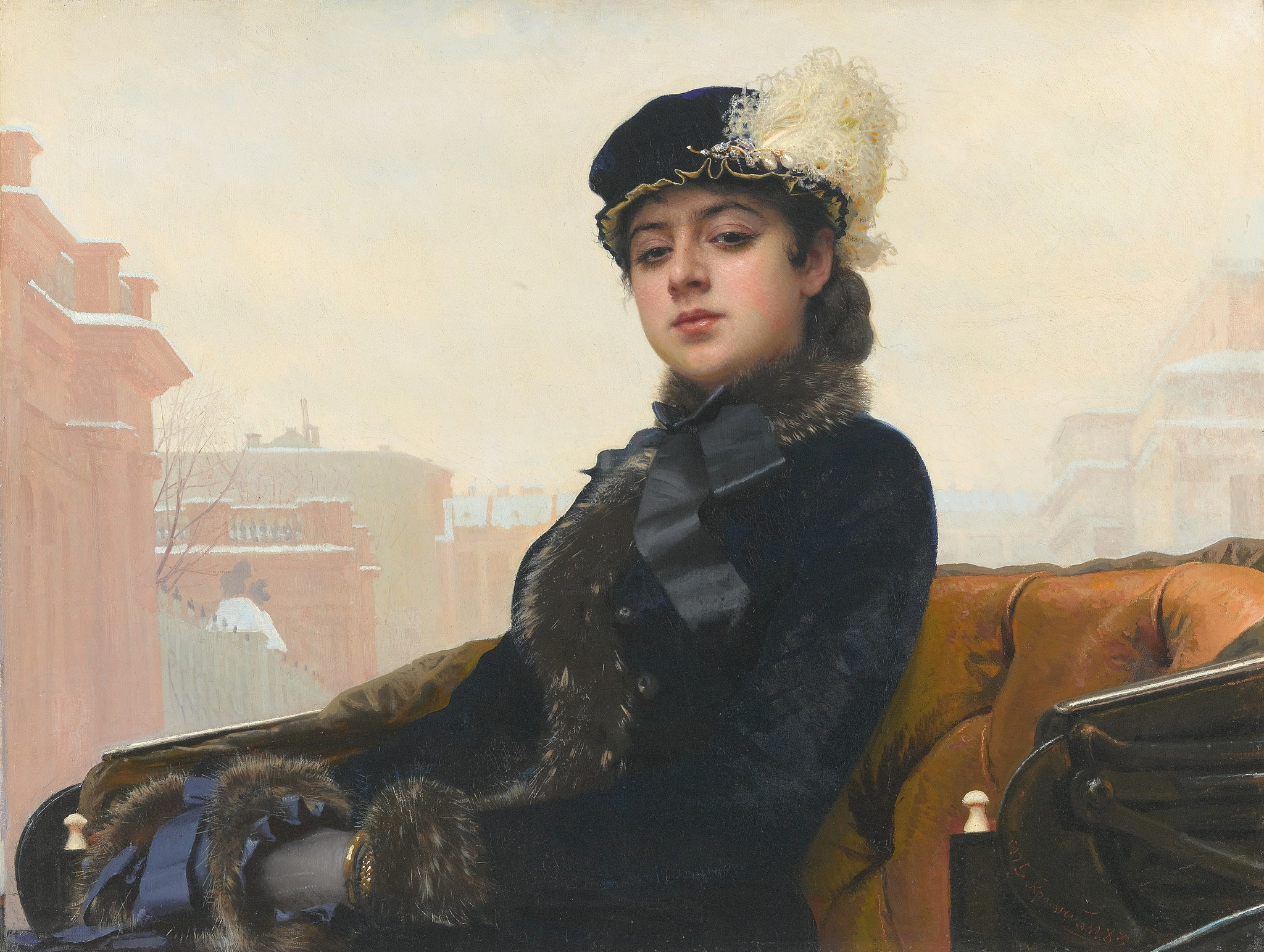
Portrait of an Unknown Woman, 1883

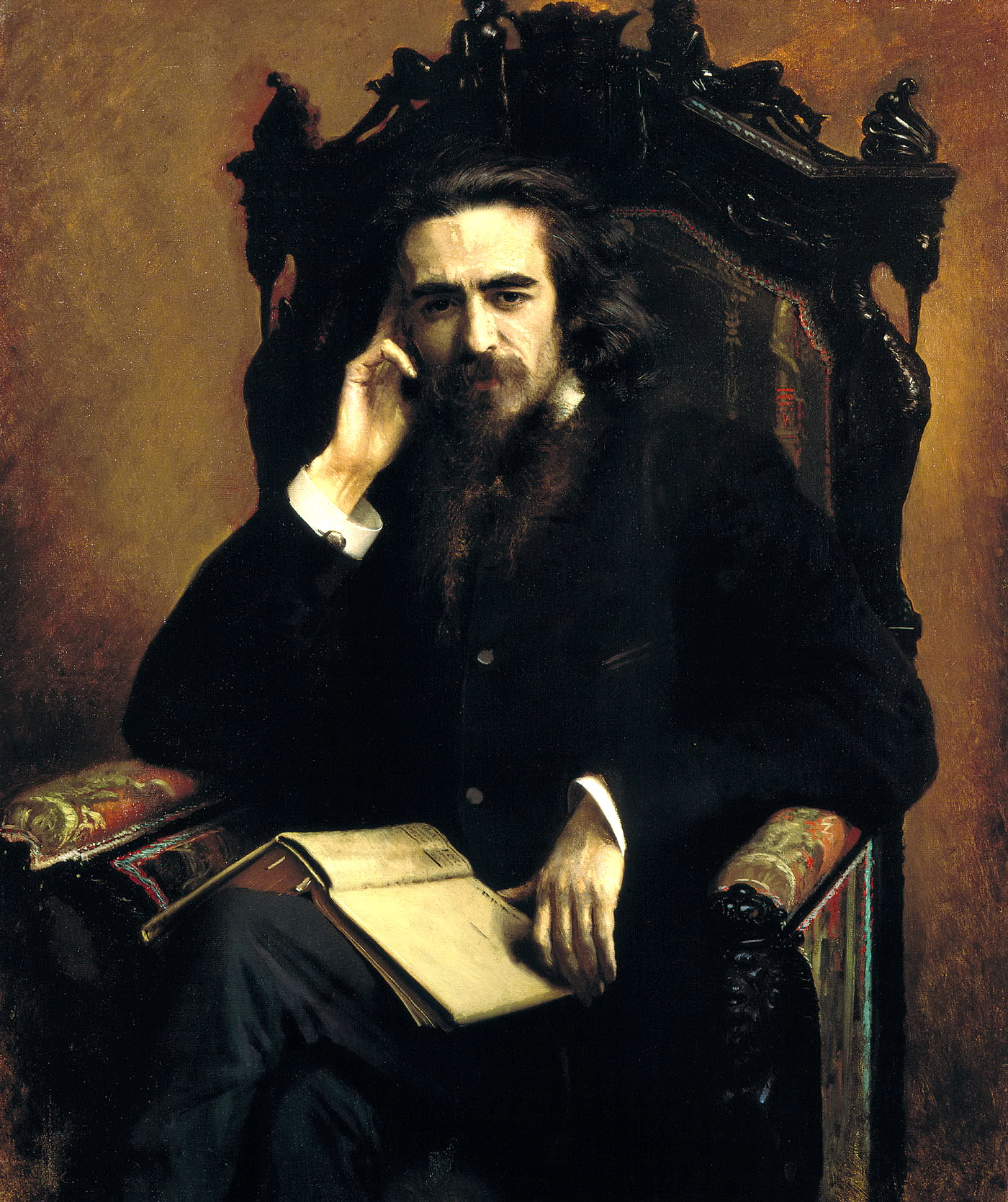
Vladimir Solovyov, 1885

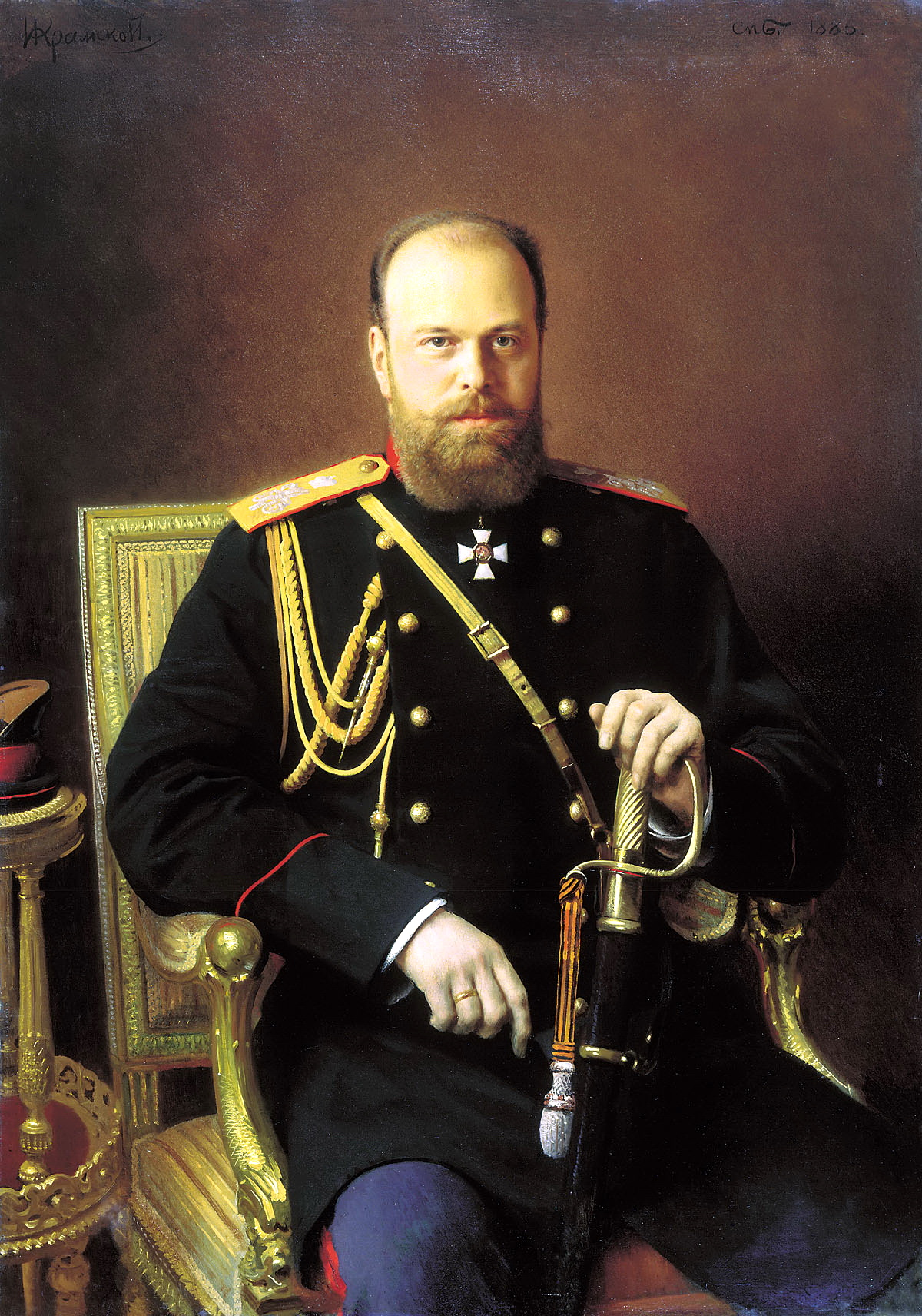
Tsar Alexander III, 1886

== Publications ==
- Kramskoi, Ivan N.; et al. (1888). Suvorin, Aleksey S. and Stasov, Vladimir V. (eds.). Иван Николаевич Крамской. Его жизнь, переписка и художественно-критические статьи, 1837–1887 (in Russian). Saint Petersburg: Suvorin Typography. OCLC 568434544, listed in Freitag 1997, p. 207, no. 6304.
- Kramskoi, Ivan N. (1965–1966). Goldstein, Sofya N. [in Russian] (ed.). Крамской: Письма. Статьи (2 vols.) (in Russian). Moscow: Iskusstvo.
