= Hyde Park (painting) =

Painting by Claude Monet

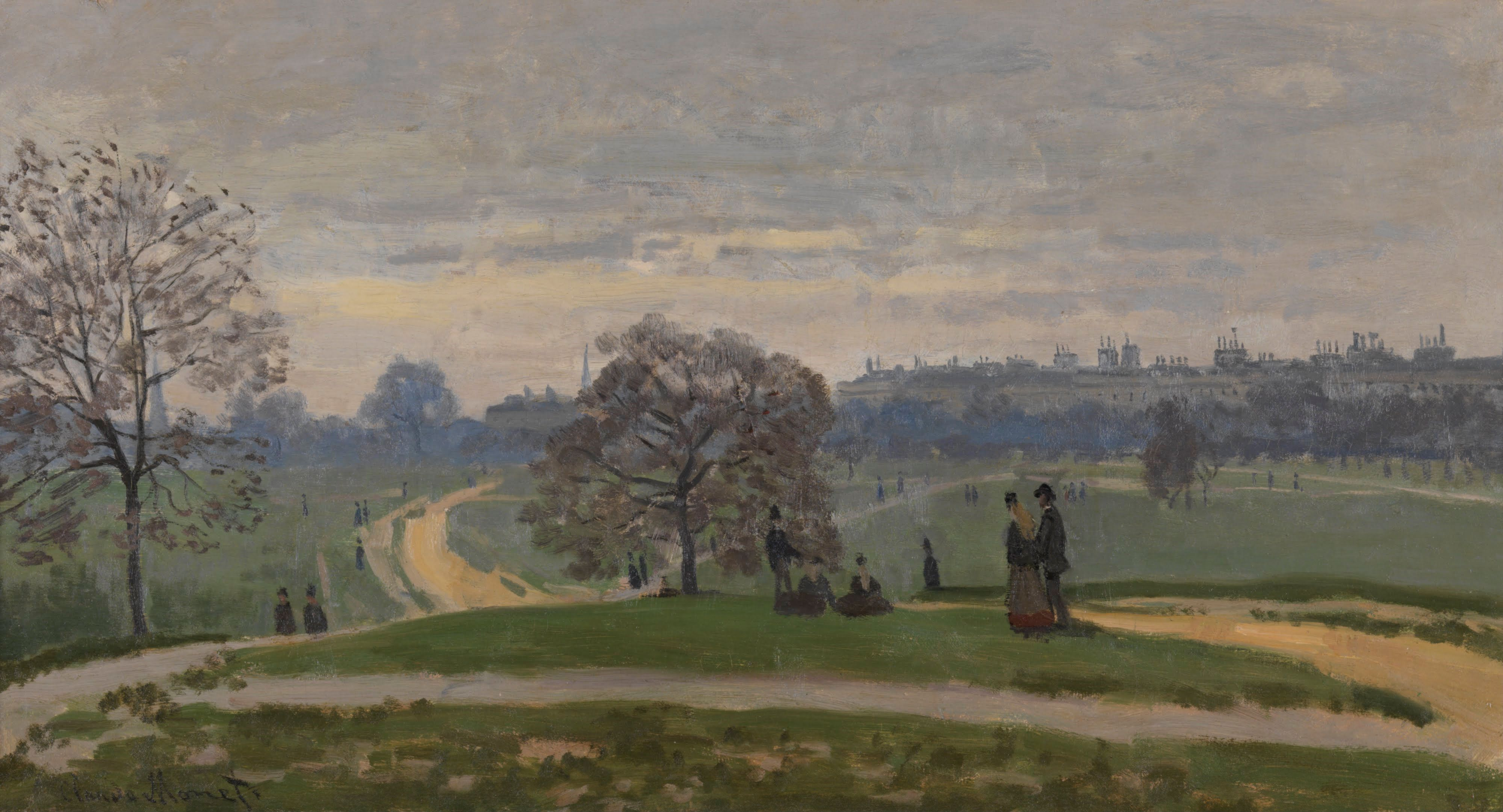
- Artist: Claude Monet
- Year: c.1871
- Medium: Oil on canvas, landscape painting
- Dimensions: 40.5 cm × 74 cm (15.9 in × 29 in)
- Location: Rhode Island School of Design Museum, Providence

Hyde Park is an 1871 oil painting by the French artist Claude Monet. It depicts a view of Hyde Park in London. Monet had fled to England on the outbreak of the Franco-Prussian War. Monet shows a panoramic of the park with various locals strolling through it, emphasising the scale of the park in contrast to the smaller more, landscaped public gardens of Paris. It features the path running from The Serpentine to the Bayswater Road, with the two church spires on the horizon representing St James's in Sussex Gardens and Christ Church in Lancaster Gate. He also produced a companion work Green Park. The picture is in the collection of the Rhode Island School of Design Museum in Providence having been acquired in 1942.

== See also ==
- List of paintings by Claude Monet

== Bibliography ==
- Corbeau-Parsons, Caroline (ed.) Impressionists in London: French Artists in Exile 1870–1904. Tate Publishing, 2017.
- McConkey, Kenneth. Impressionism in Britain. Yale University Press, 1995.
