= Armand Guillaumin =

French painter

- Born: Jean-Baptiste Armand Guillaumin; 16 February 1841; Paris, France
- Died: 26 June 1927 (aged 86); Orly, Val-de-Marne, France
- Known for: Painting
- Movement: Impressionism

Signature
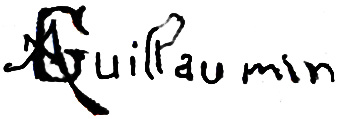

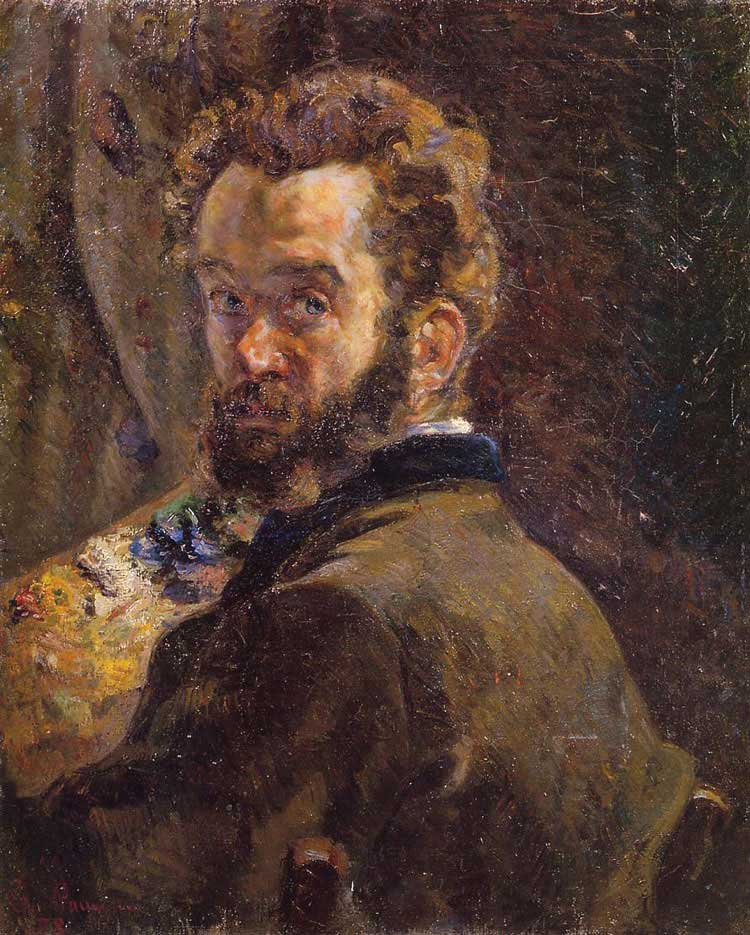
Self-Portrait, 1878

Armand Guillaumin (French: [aʁmɑ̃ ɡijomɛ̃]; 16 February 1841 – 26 June 1927) was a French Impressionist painter and lithographer.

== Biography ==
=== Early years ===
Born Jean-Baptiste Armand Guillaumin in Paris, he worked at his uncle's lingerie shop while attending evening drawing lessons. He also worked for a French government railway before studying at the Académie Suisse in 1861. There, he met Paul Cézanne and Camille Pissarro, with whom he maintained lifelong friendships. While he never achieved the stature of these two, his influence on their work was significant. With these two friends, Guillaumin exhibited at the Salon des Refusés in 1863.The three artists frequently painted in each other's company in the 1870s; for a time, Guillaumin and Cézanne had studios next door to each other on the Île Saint-Louis in Paris. In 1873, Cézanne made the only etchings of his career, one of them depicting Guillaumin (see Gallery below).

Guillaumin was a member of the Société anonyme des artistes peintres, sculpteurs et graveurs (later dubbed Impressionistes) from the start and he participated in six of the eight Impressionist exhibitions: 1874, 1877, 1880, 1881, 1882 and 1886. In the eyes of contemporary critics, he became known for his assured brushstroke and use of bold colours. In 1886, an astute critic, Félix Fénéon, called him a "furious colourist"; By the 1890s, his palette had grown even bolder, less faithful to nature. He was a Fauve a decade before Fauvism.

=== Full-time painter ===
In 1886, he became a friend of Vincent van Gogh, whose brother, Theo, exhibited and sold some of his works. Vincent held Guillaumin's work in high regard, commenting on it in at least 36 letters written from 1888 to 1890. In the mid 1880s, Guillaumin's studio was a meeting place for young artists such as Paul Gauguin, Paul Signac and Georges Seurat. Guillaumin was finally able to quit his government job and concentrate on painting full-time in 1891, when he won 100,000 francs in the state lottery.

=== Exhibitions and collections ===
Armand Guillaumin was given large solo exhibitions at many of the top Parisian galleries, including Galeries Durand-Ruel in 1895, Galerie Ambroise Vollard in 1897, Galerie Bernheim-Jeune in 1901 and 1906, and Galerie Paul Rosenberg in 1908. Noted for their intense colours, Guillaumin's paintings are represented in major museums around the world. These include the Musée d’Orsay (48 works) and Petit Palais (91 works) in Paris, the Tate Britain in London, major museums in Germany, Russia, the Netherlands and Spain, the Metropolitan Museum of Art in New York, the National Gallery of Art in Washington DC, the Art Institute of Chicago, and many others in the U.S.A,, Canada, Israel and Japan. Private collectors, many of whom owned dozens of works, bought up his production through the 1920s. Noteworthy among these are Count Armand Doria, Dr. Paul Gachet, Théodore Duret, Gustave Geffroy, Louis Vauxcelles, Tadamasa Hayashi, Sergei Shchukin, Chester Dale and Paul Mellon.

=== Legacy ===
Guillaumin is best remembered for his landscapes of Paris, the Creuse département, and the area around Les Adrets-de-l'Estérel near the Mediterranean coast in the Provence-Alpes-Côte d'Azur region of France. Guillaumin was called the leader of the École de Crozant, a diverse group of painters who came to depict the landscape in the region of the Creuse around the village of Crozant. One of these depictions, titled Landscape in Crozant, is housed in the Art Institute of Chicago. His bust is in the square near the village church in Crozant.

=== Death ===
Armand Guillaumin died in 1927 in Orly, Val-de-Marne just south of Paris.

== Gallery ==
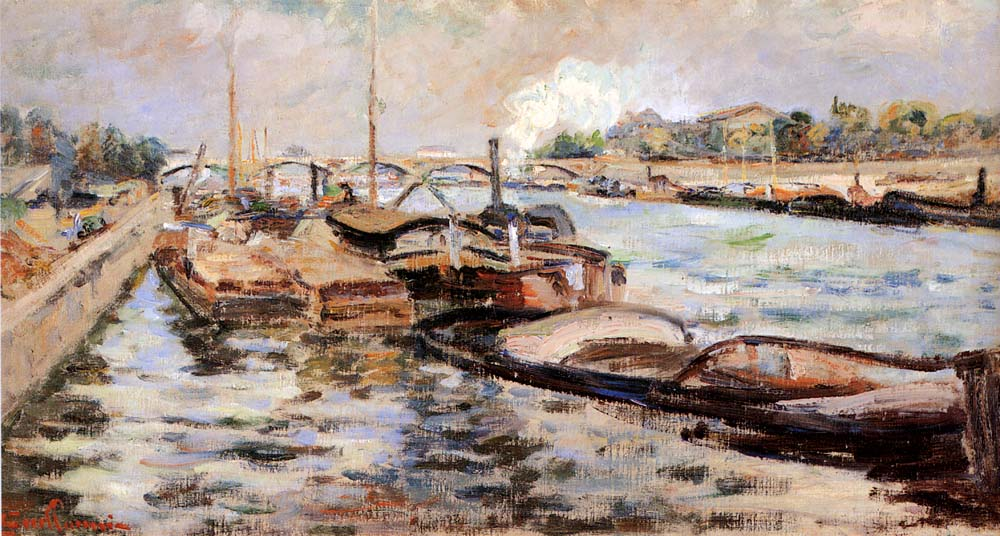
The Seine, 1867

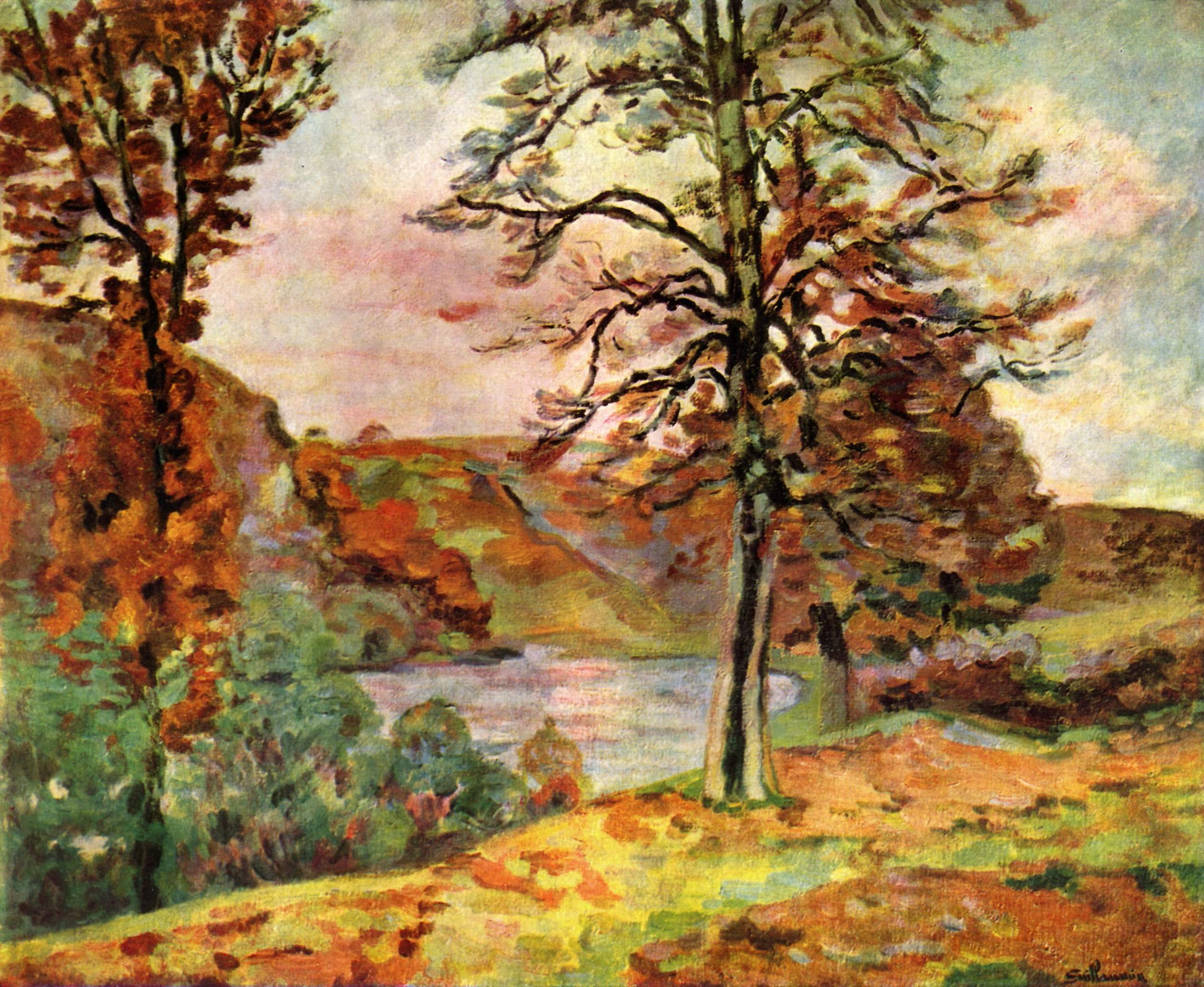
Landscape, 1870

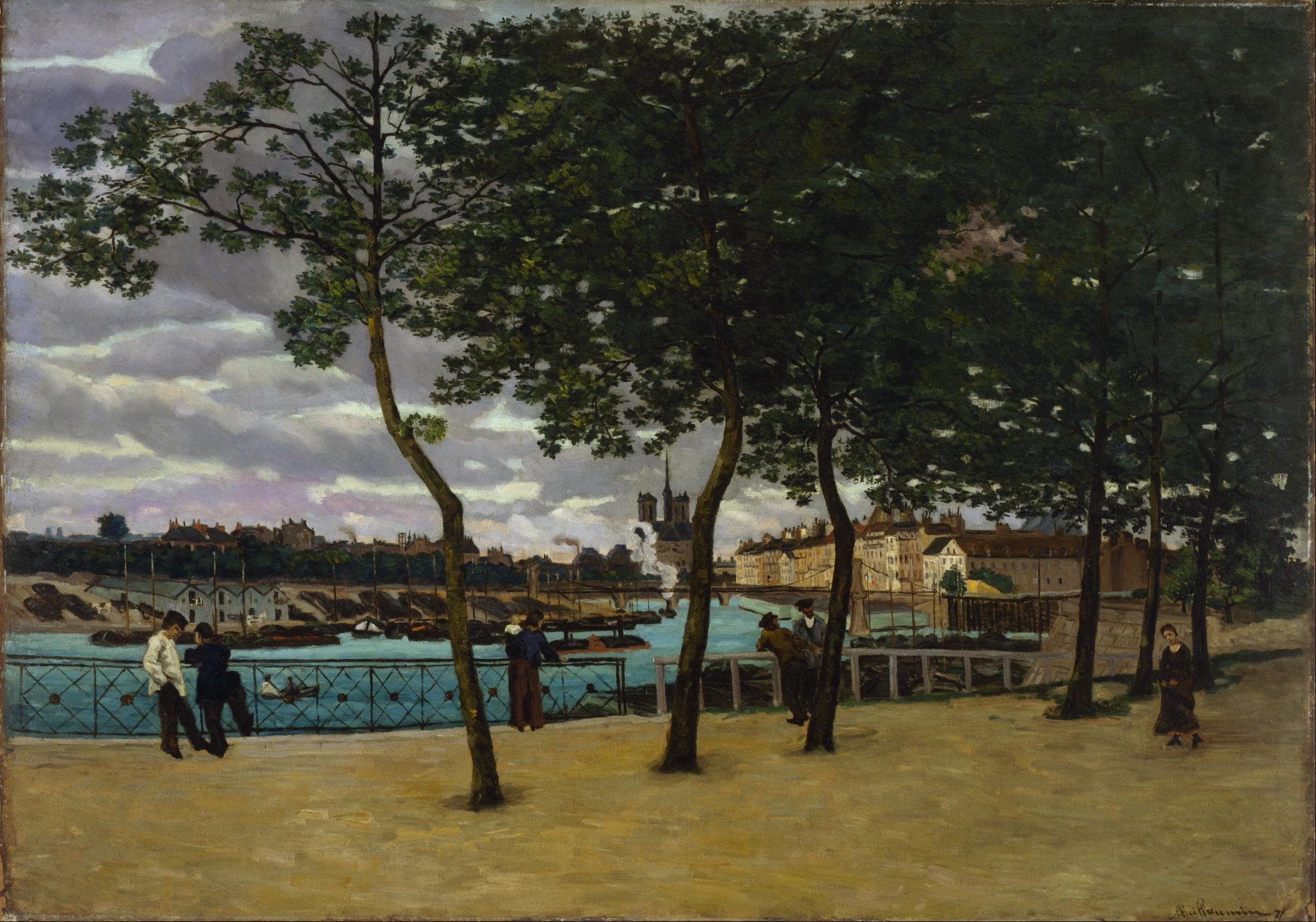
View of the Seine, Paris, 1871, Oil on canvas, 126.4 × 181.3 cm., Museum of Fine Arts, Houston

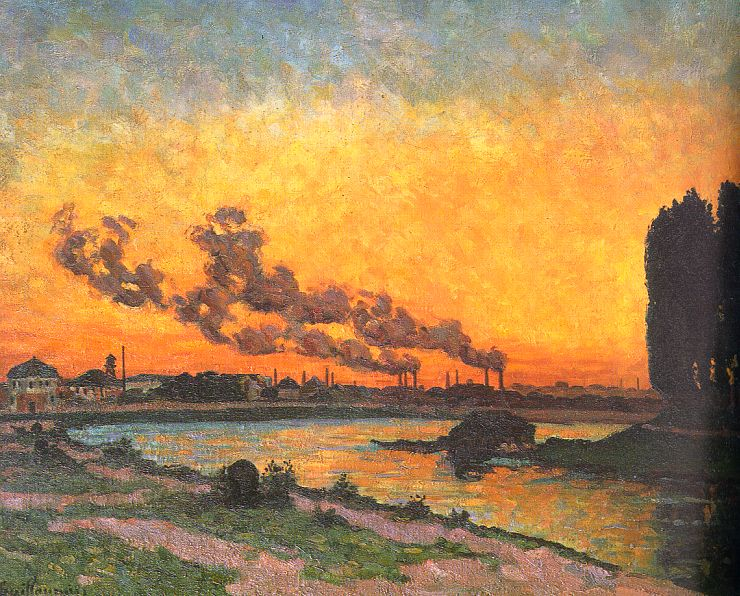
Sunset at Ivry (Soleil couchant à Ivry), 1873, 81 cm x 65 cm. Oil on canvas. Musée d'Orsay

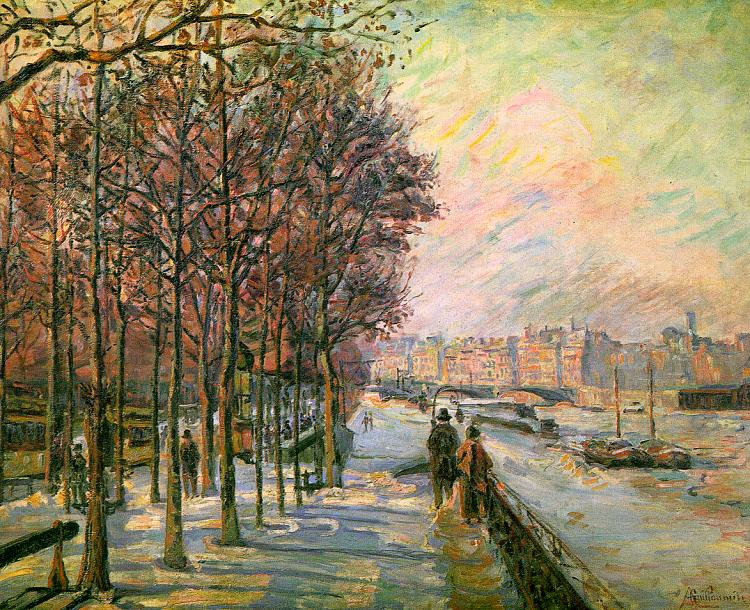
La Place Valhubert, 1875

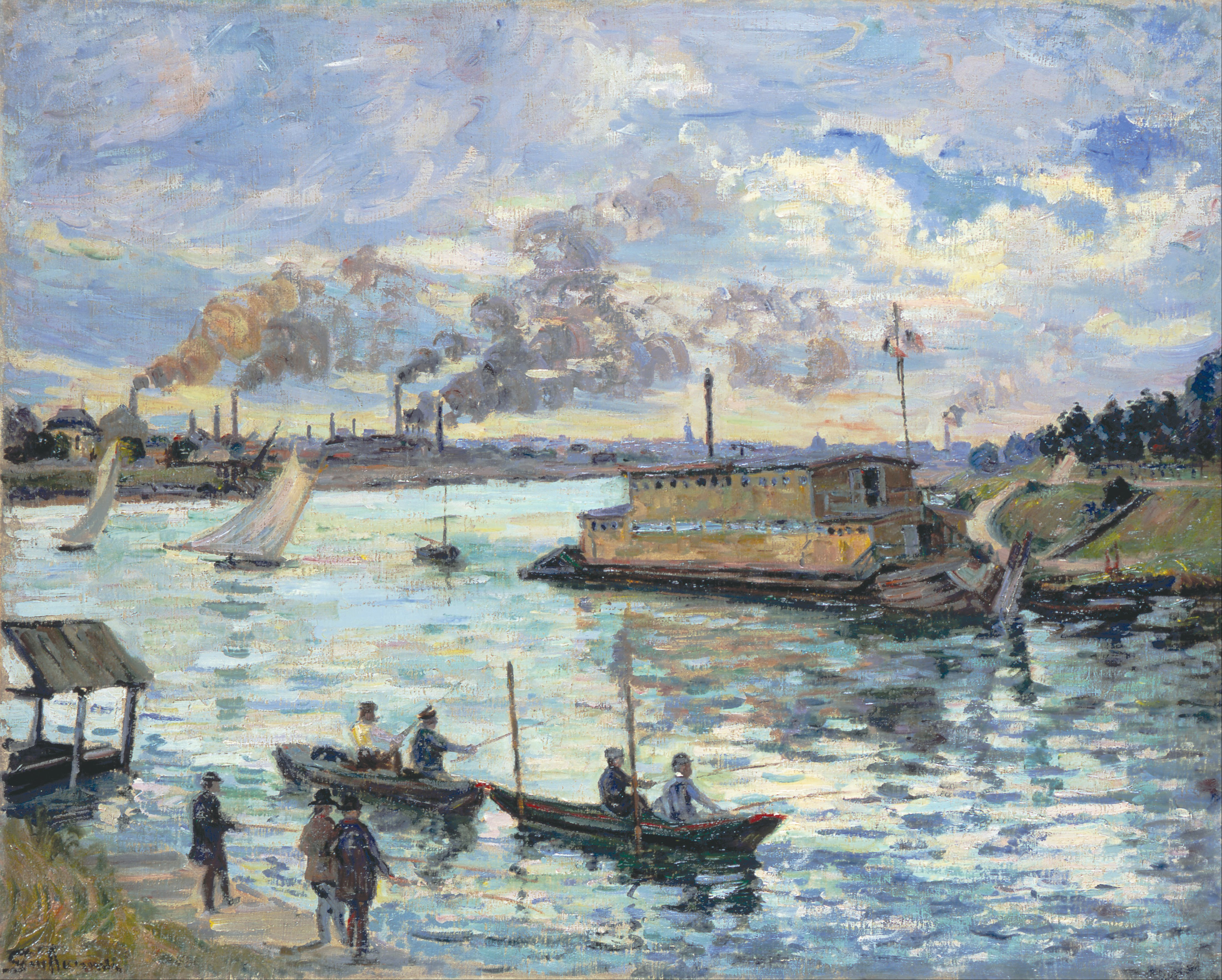
River Scene, c. 1890

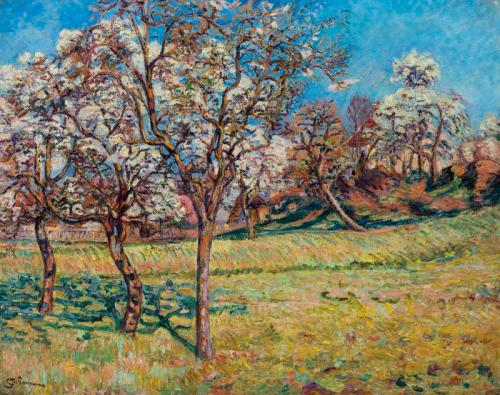
Les Pommiers à Damiette, 1893, Aberdeen Art Gallery

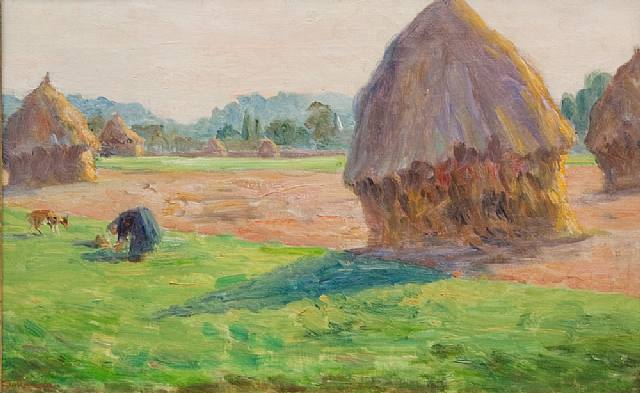
The Haystacks, c. 1890-1895

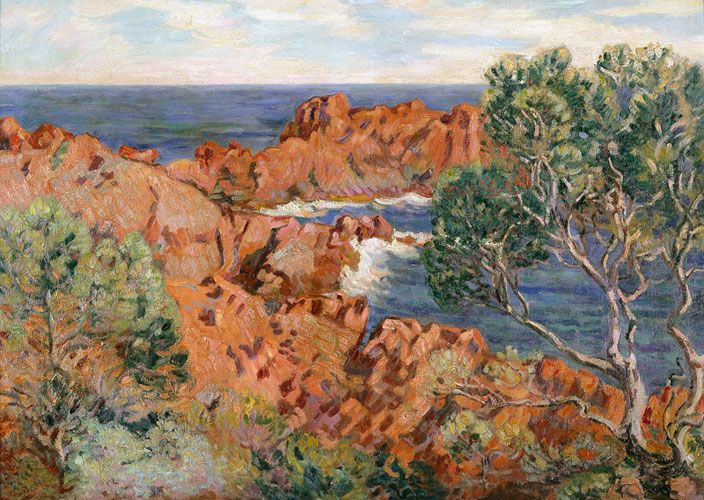
Agay by Jean-Baptiste Armand Guillaumin, circa 1901

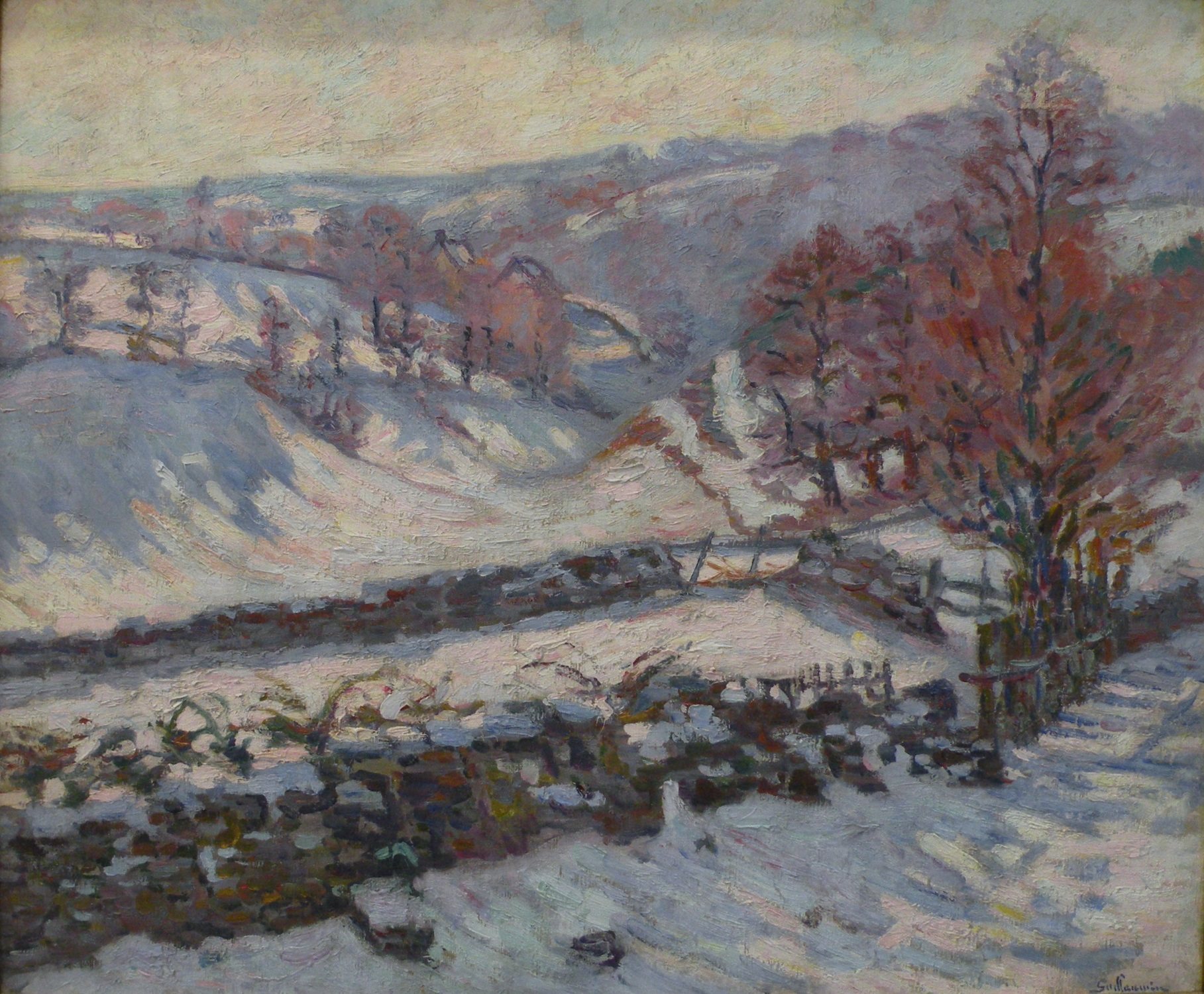
Snowy landscape in Crozant

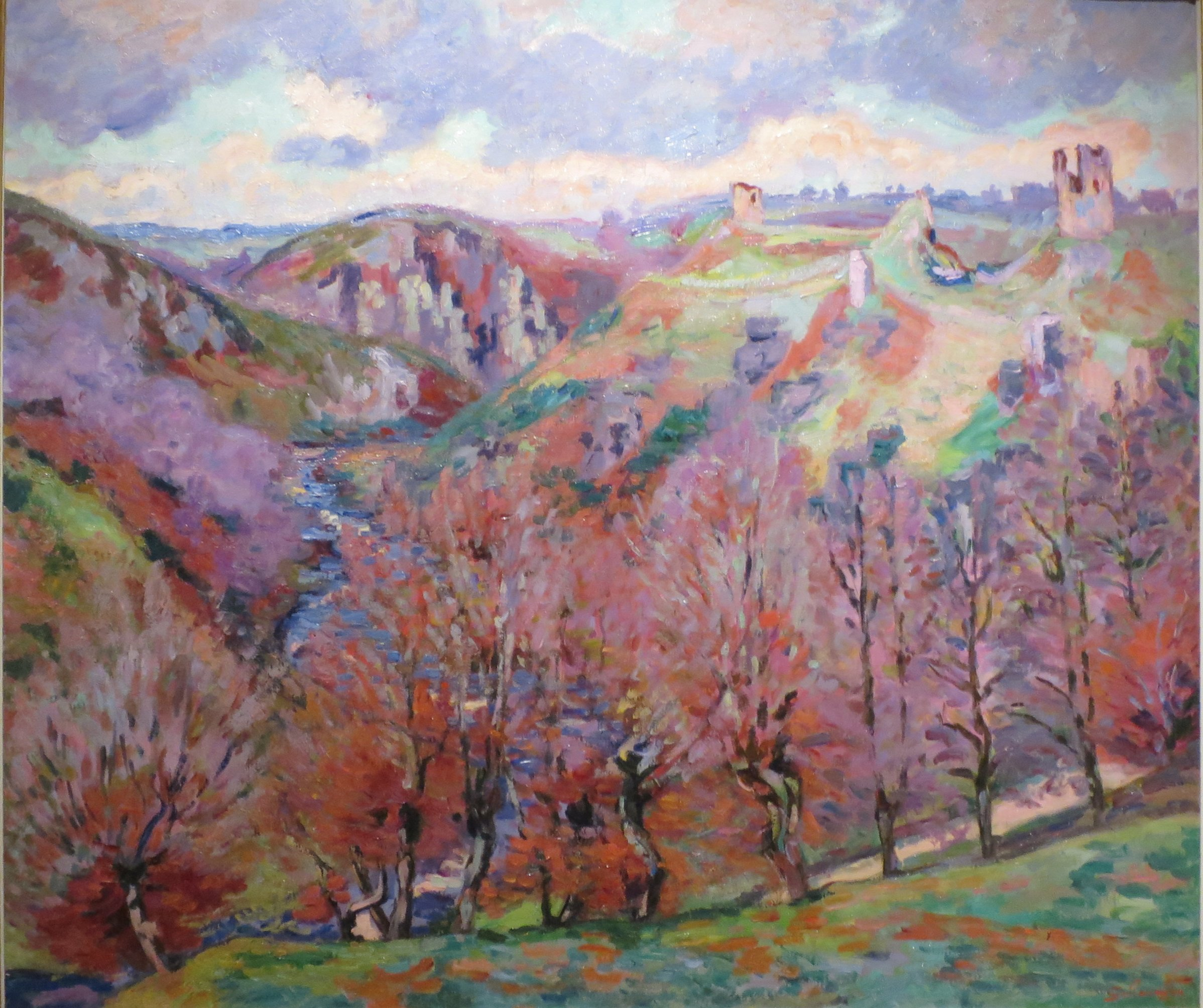
Landscape with Ruins, 1897

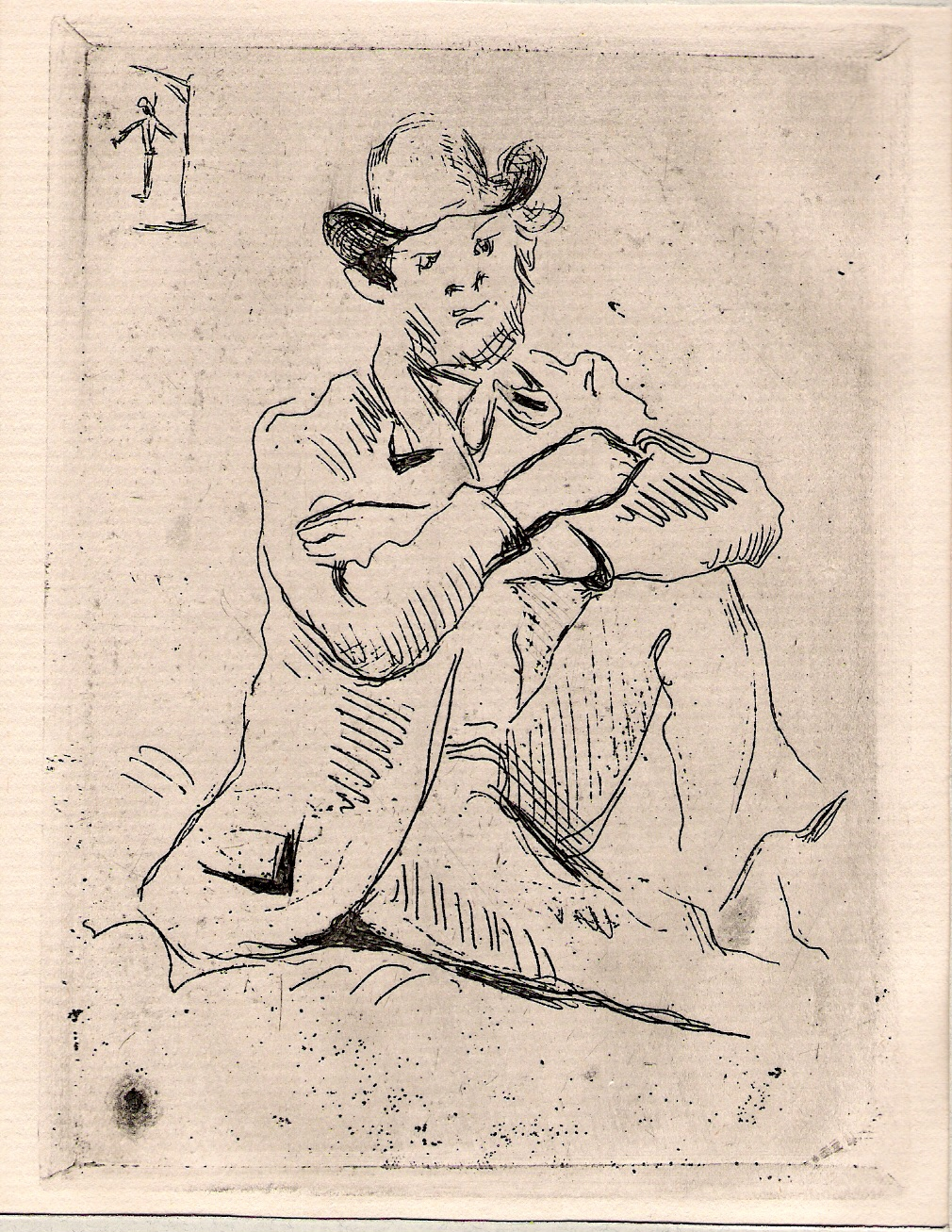
Paul Cézanne, Guillaumin Thinking, 1873
