= The Mermaids (Kramskoi) =

1871 painting by Ivan Kramskoi

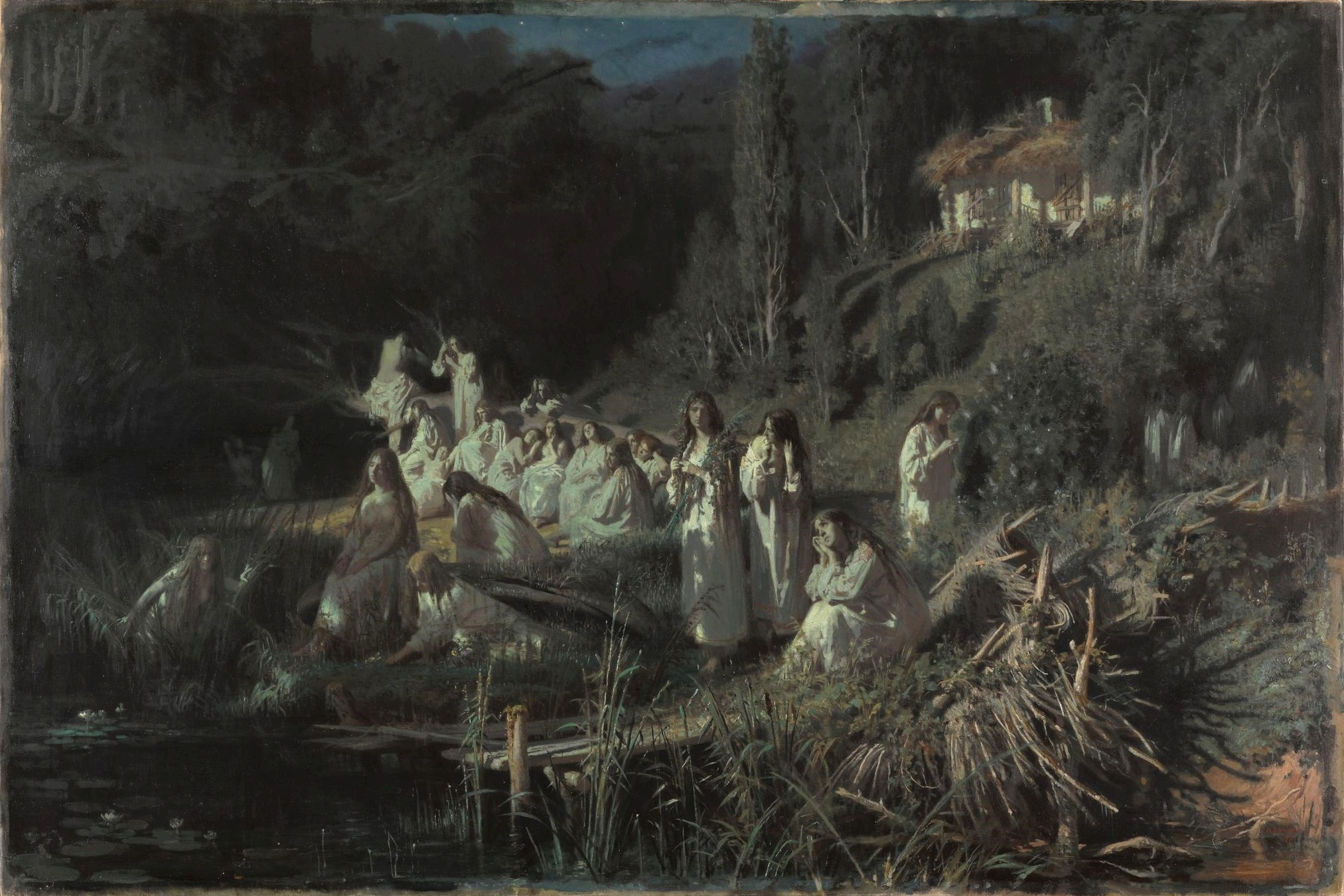
The Mermaids, 1871 (88cm × 132cm)

The Mermaids (also known as Drowned Maidens; Russian: Русалки) is an 1871 oil-on-canvas by the Russian artist Ivan Kramskoi.

It depicts nineteen rusalki, who, according to Slavic mythology, were river or lake spirits who appeared at night in the form of young women. Some versions of the myths describe them as spirits who had died unbaptised or unmarried, or had drowned themselves following an unrequited love. They would emerge from the water at night to sing and dance. They fulfilled a similar folkloric role to sirens; often enchanting young men before luring them to their deaths at the bottom of the water.

The painting is held in the Tretyakov Gallery, Moscow.

== Literary sources ==
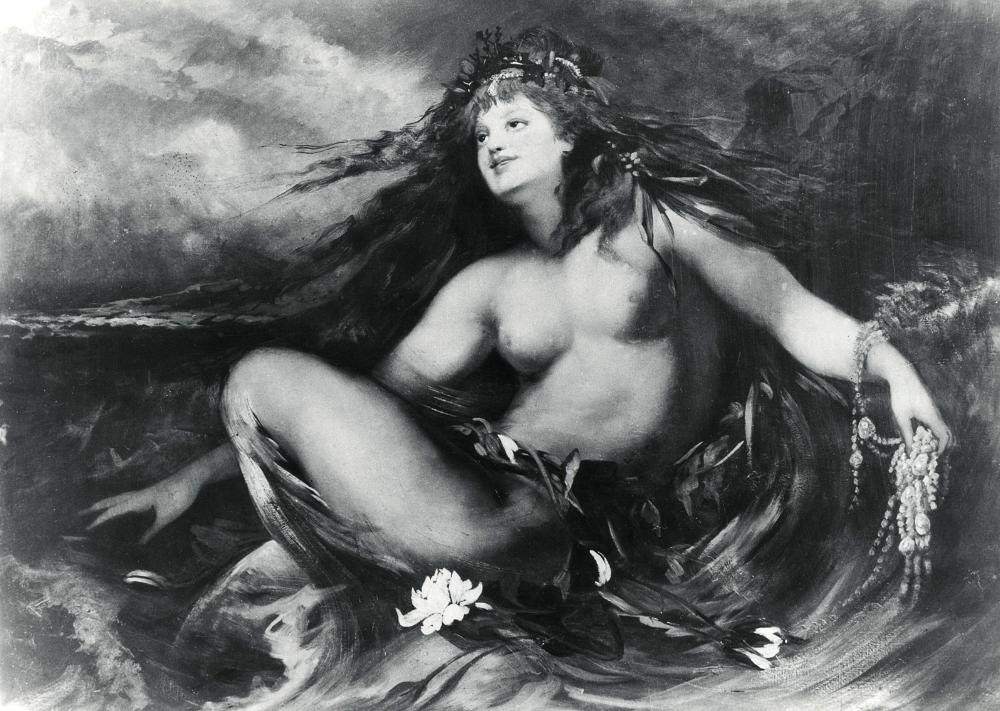
Hans Makart, Gifts of the Sea, 1870.

The painting is based around works by Alexander Pushkin and Nikolai Gogol's 1831 fantastic story "A May Night, or The Drowned Maiden," and shows that despite the realist principles of the newly formed Peredvizhniki movement in which Kramskoi was a leading light, the artist continued to be interested in more Romantic fantasy and fairy-tale subject matter.

== Description ==
The painting is set at night and is almost entirely without colour. The women occupy the centre mid-ground of the painting and are lit from high above the left hand of the canvas, presumably by the moon. The source of light throws shadow inconsistently.

Most of the women are huddled together in a row, while some are at the edge of the bank or alone to the right seemingly lost in their own thoughts. In the left foreground the last of Kramskoi's rusalki is emerging from among the reeds, while in the background one of the women wrings out the water from her hair. The water bank is at the foot of a steep hill and surrounded by deep forest to the right. At the top of the small hill and to the right background is a small, seemingly unoccupied cabin. The subject matter and composition is likely to have been influenced by the work of the Hungarian painter and designer Hans Makart.
