= Artel of Artists =

Cooperative association led by Russian artists during 1863–1871

- The St. Petersburg Artel of Artists
- Санкт-Петербургская артель художников
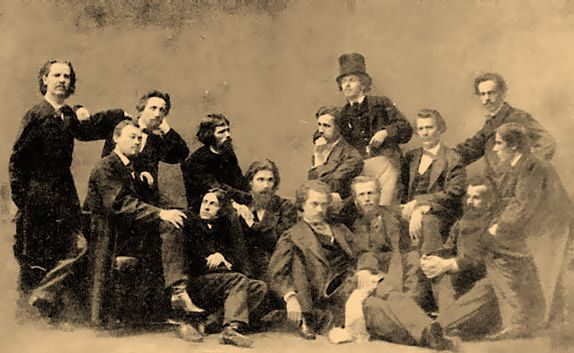
- Group photo, 1863.
- Formation: 1863; 163 years ago
- Founder: Ivan Kramskoi
- Dissolved: 1871; 155 years ago
- Type: Artel
- Location: Saint Petersburg, Russian Empire
- Members: Bogdan Wenig, Firs Zhuravlev, Alexander Morozov, Kirill Lemokh, Ivan Kramskoi, Alexander Litovchenko, Konstantin Makovsky, Nikolai Dmitriev, Nikolai Petrov, Vasily Kreitan, Mikhail Peskov, Nikolay Shustov, Alexei Korzukhin, Alexander Grigoriev
- Leader: Ivan Kramskoi
- Treasurer: Alexei Korzukhin

The St. Petersburg Artel of Artists was a cooperative association (artel) led by Russian artists during 1863–1871. It was founded in Saint Petersburg on the initiative of Ivan Kramskoi following a revolt by fourteen students in the St. Petersburg Academy of Arts (Revolt of the Fourteen).

== History ==
=== Formation and flourishing ===
On 9 November 1863, fourteen top students in the Imperial Academy of Arts held a protest against the Academy's decision to only allow artwork of Scandinavian mythology in the competition for the Large Gold Medal of Academia, held on the occasion of the 100th anniversary of the Academy of Arts. The subsequent exit of the artists from the Academy, which went down in the history as the "Revolt of the Fourteen", put its participants in a difficult financial situation.

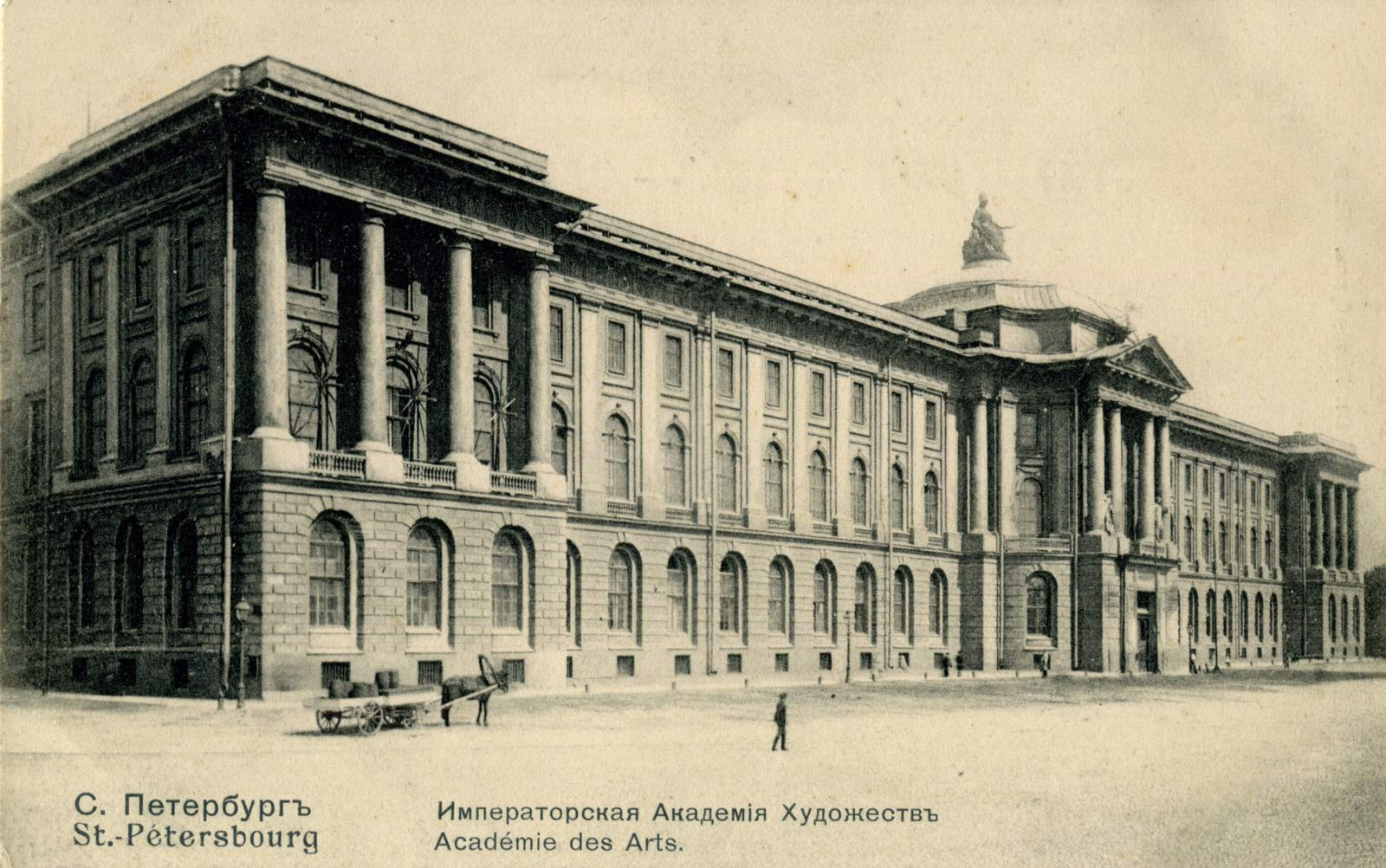
Imperial Academy of Arts

After leaving the Academy of Arts, the artists vacated their workshops in Academy, which were not only used for work, but also for living. As a result, the participants of the "revolt" united into a labour commune.

The idea for the artel was formed by Ivan Kramskoi. Thus, after its creation, he became the foreman of the artel and remained its leader until its collapse.

Artel workers rented an apartment on the Vasilyevsky Island, where there not only were rooms for living but also three large art workshops, in each of which several people could work at the same time. Together with the Kramskoi, five artists settled in a common apartment: Bogdan Venig, Alexander Grigoriev, Firs Zhuravlev, Alexei Korzukhin and Nikolay Shustov. The rest of the artel members lived in private apartments.

On 9 June 1865, the official charter of the Artel was approved, according to which the members of the Artel had to pay 10% of each independently sold work and 25% of the jointly performed work.

The first to leave the Artel was Alexander Litovchenko, who refused to spend money to place advertisements in the St. Petersburg Vedomosti newspaper. The second artist to leave the Artel was Konstantin Makovsky who rented his own studio on Palace Square as he was already earning a lot of money from his paintings. Part of the artel workers who remained the Artel often avoided contributing money to the general fund from the works sold independently. This outraged Kramskoi who agreed to the proposal of Alexey Tarasovich Markov to paint the main dome of the Cathedral of Christ the Saviour for 10,000 rubles. Bogdan Venig and Nikolay Koshelev became Kramskoi's assistants.

Kramskoi used the money he received for the painting to move the artel to a more prestigious area of the city. He rented an apartment in Admiralteyskaya Square in 1866. Gradually, the income of the artel grew. The increased income allowed Kramskoi to go abroad at his own expense. By 1868, the total capital of the Artel reached 10,000 rubles.

=== Dissolution ===
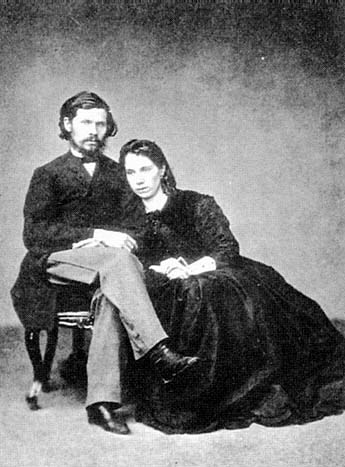
Photograph of Ivan Kramskoi with his wife (1863–1864)

In the fall of 1870, one of the members of the Artel, Nikolai Dmitriev, secretly submitted a petition to the Imperial Academy of Arts for a three-year overseas retirement, which was approved by the Academy Council. Outraged by the fact that a participant in the "Revolt of the Fourteen" was negotiating with the Academy behind the backs of the artel workers, Kramskoi submitted an application to the Artel demanding to publicly condemn the behaviour of Dmitriev on 19 October 1870.

On 7 November 1870, a meeting of members of the Artel was held, at which the artel workers refused to satisfy Kramskoi's statement, citing that Dmitriev did not formally violate any provisions of the charter. Dissatisfied with the decision of the meeting, Kramskoy submitted a second application, insisting on the exclusion of Dmitriev from the Artel. The members again refused to condemn Dmitriev. Outraged by the unscrupulousness of the members of the Artel, Kramskoi submitted an application to withdraw his membership from the Artel on 24 November 1870.

Having lost its founder and permanent leader, the Artel gradually fell into decay. It was formally disestablished in 1871. Some of the members of the Artel joined the newly created Association of Traveling Art Exhibitions, which subsequently played a key role in the development of Russian fine arts of the 19th century.

Some misunderstandings began in the Artel. At first, it was family disagreements between the wives of the artel workers, which ended in the exit of two members. One of the members of the Artel came under the special patronage of the Academy and in the future had a trip abroad at public expense. Kramskoi found this act of a comrade a violation of their main principle: not to use the benefits of the Academy alone, since it was decided upon leaving the Academy to stick to a partnership and not go for academic baits at retail. He submitted a written statement to his comrades and demanded that they express their opinion on how they view such an act. The comrades answered evasively, with silence. As a result, Kramskoi left the Artists' Artel. After this, the Artel lost its significance and imperceptibly melted away.

— Ilya Repin, Distant Close (1937)
