= Nikolai Petrovich Petrov =

Russian painter

- Николай Петрович Петров
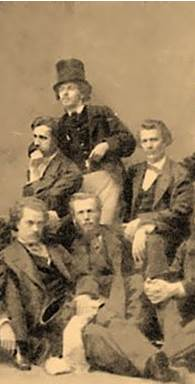
- Nikolai Petrov (in the hat) with other members of the Artel
- Born: September 6, 1834; Sankt Petersburg
- Died: July 13, 1876 (aged 41); Ariccia
- Education: Member Academy of Arts (1867)
- Alma mater: Imperial Academy of Arts (1863)
- Known for: Painting

Nikolai Petrovich Petrov (Russian: Николай Петрович Петров; 18 September 1834, in Saint Petersburg – 25 July 1876, in Ariccia) was a Russian genre painter; one of the founders of the Artel of Artists.

== Biography ==
He was born to a middle-class family and attended the Imperial Academy of Fine Arts, where he studied under Alexey Markov and was awarded several small silver medals. In 1860, he won a large silver medal for his painting of three fables by Ivan Krylov. In 1862, he was awarded a gold medal for his canvas "Courting the Tailor's Daughter", which remains one of his most familiar works.

The following year, he was one of the graduate students who participated in the "Revolt of the Fourteen"; refusing to compete for a special gold medal on the occasion of the Academy's 100th anniversary, in protest of the school's continued adherence to what they felt were outmoded styles and teaching methods. Later, they and joined together to form the "Artel of Artists", an organization devoted to promoting Realism in the arts.

Through the aegis of the Artel, he received numerous commissions. He was also involved in church decoration projects in Kronstadt, Ostrogozhsk, Oskol and Yekaterinodar and painted portraits of the nobility. For a time, he operated his own drawing school. In 1867, despite his participation in the Revolt, the Academy named him an "Academician" for his work, "Farmer in Distress".

In 1873, he began to show the symptoms of tuberculosis. In an effort to regain his health, he moved to Italy, spent some time studying the Old Masters, and created genre scenes on Italian subjects. The climate failed to improve his illness, however, and he died from it in 1876. He was buried at the Cimitero Acattolico in Rome, not far from his fellow Russian painters, Pimen Orlov and Karl Bryullov.

== Selected paintings ==
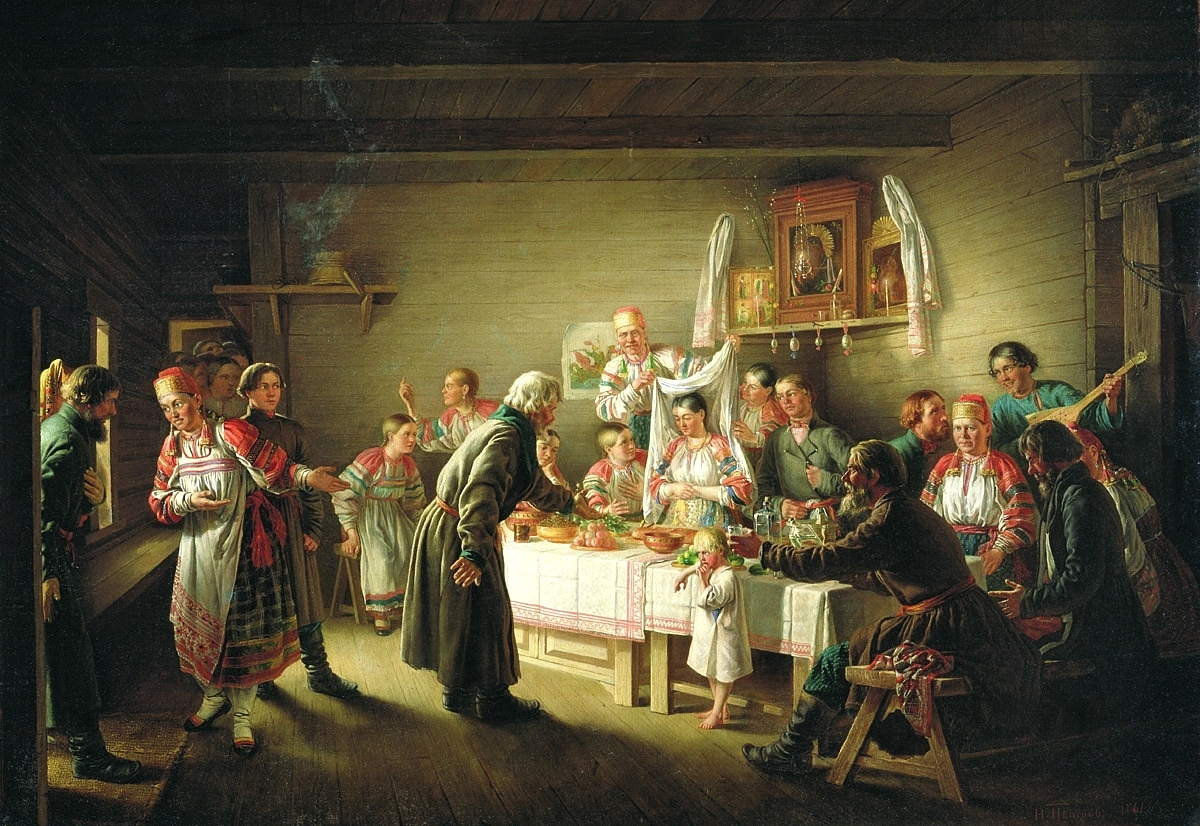
Bride before the wedding (1861)

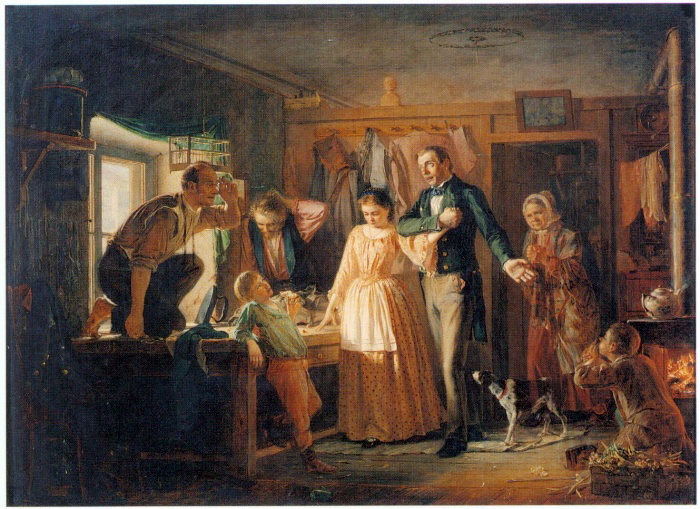
Courting the Tailor's Daughter (1862)

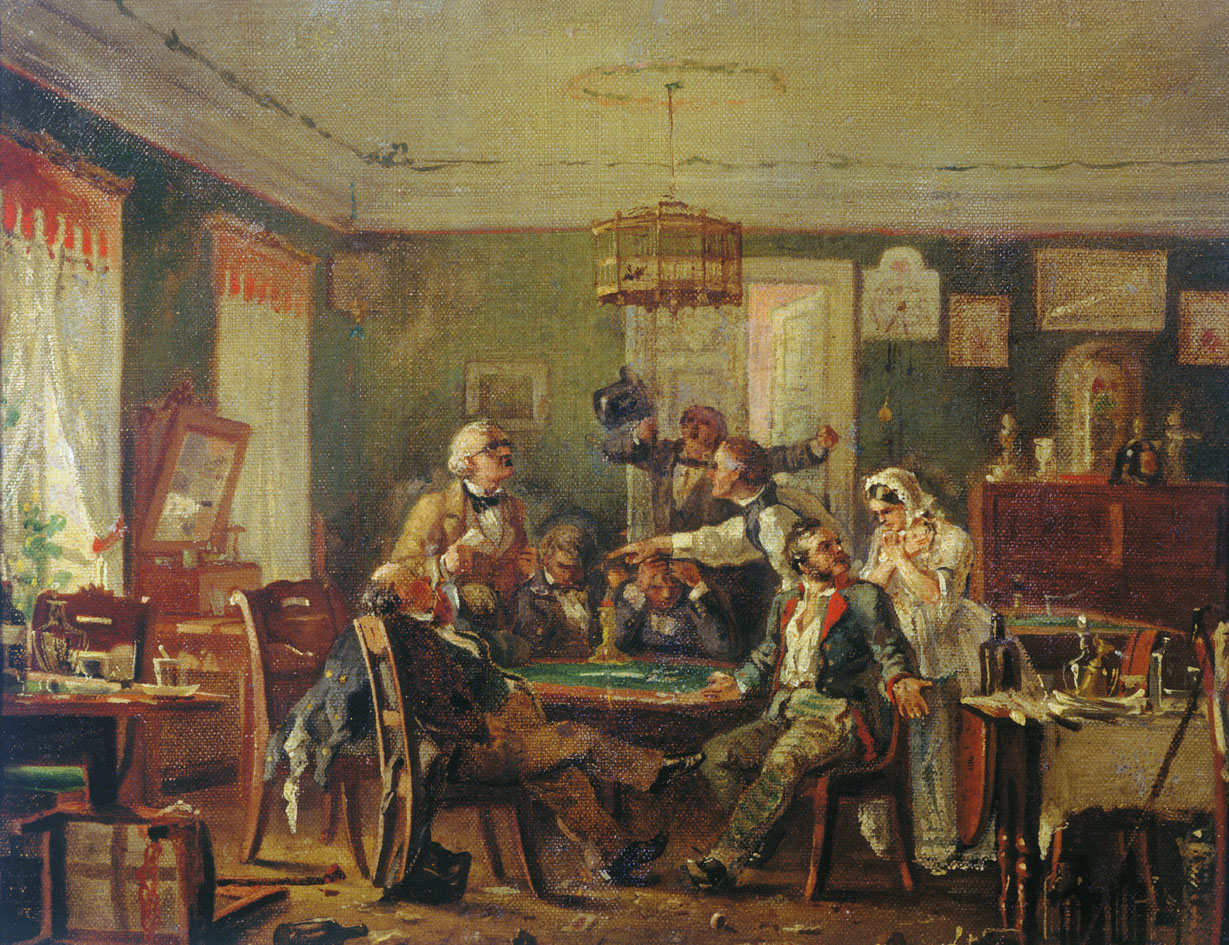
Card game (before 1876)

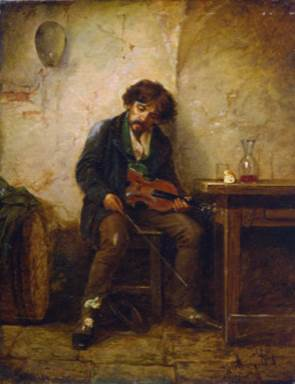
Musician (1876)

== Literary sources ==
- С. Н. Кондаков (1915). Юбилейный справочник Императорской Академии художеств. 1764-1914 (in Russian). Vol. 2. p. 152.
