= Alexei Korzukhin =

Russian painter

- Алексей Корзухин
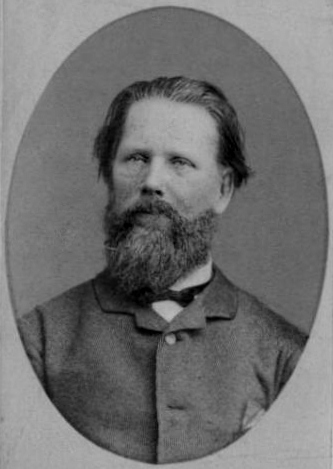
- Photograph by Andrey Denyer
- Born: March 11, 1835; Perm Governorate
- Died: October 18, 1894 (aged 59); Saint Petersburg
- Education: Member Academy of Arts (1868)
- Alma mater: Imperial Academy of Arts (1863)
- Known for: Painting
- Movement: Peredvizhniki

Alexei Ivanovich Korzukhin (Russian: Алексей Иванович Корзухин; 1835–1894) was a Russian genre painter.

== Biography ==
He was born into a family of gold prospectors near Yekaterinburg. As a young man, he worked in a local railway factory and the mint. He had started painting when he was still a child so, in 1858, he entered the Imperial Academy of Fine Arts where he studied under Pyotr Basin and Fyodor Bruni. In 1861, he was awarded a gold medal and a stipend for travelling expenses.

However, in 1863, he became a member of the "Revolt of the Fourteen", a group of students who favored Realism and were protesting the Academy's insistence on painting in the Classical style. He and the others withdrew from the Academy, accepting the designation of "Artist Second-Class". Shortly thereafter, he joined the Artel of Artists, an artistic commune, and remained with them until they disbanded in 1871. He also became a member of the "Association of Travelling Art Exhibitions" (Peredvizhniki) and taught drawing at the "Imperial Society for the Encouragement of the Arts".

In 1865, his painting "Wake in the Village Cemetery" earned him the rank of "Artist First-Class" and, three years later, he was named an Academician. In addition to his paintings of daily life, he did portraits and religious works. These include icons and depictions of the Four Fathers of the Church at the Cathedral of Christ the Saviour; wall paintings at the Ascension Cathedral in Yelets; and thirteen images for the narthex of Nativity Cathedral, Riga. He also exhibited widely, including the Second Annual International Exhibition in London (1872), the Weltausstellung in Vienna (1873) and the Centennial Exposition in Philadelphia (1876).

He was a witness to the extremely bloody assassination of Tsar Alexander II in 1881. This resulted in severe nervous shock and he never fully recovered his health.

== Selected paintings ==
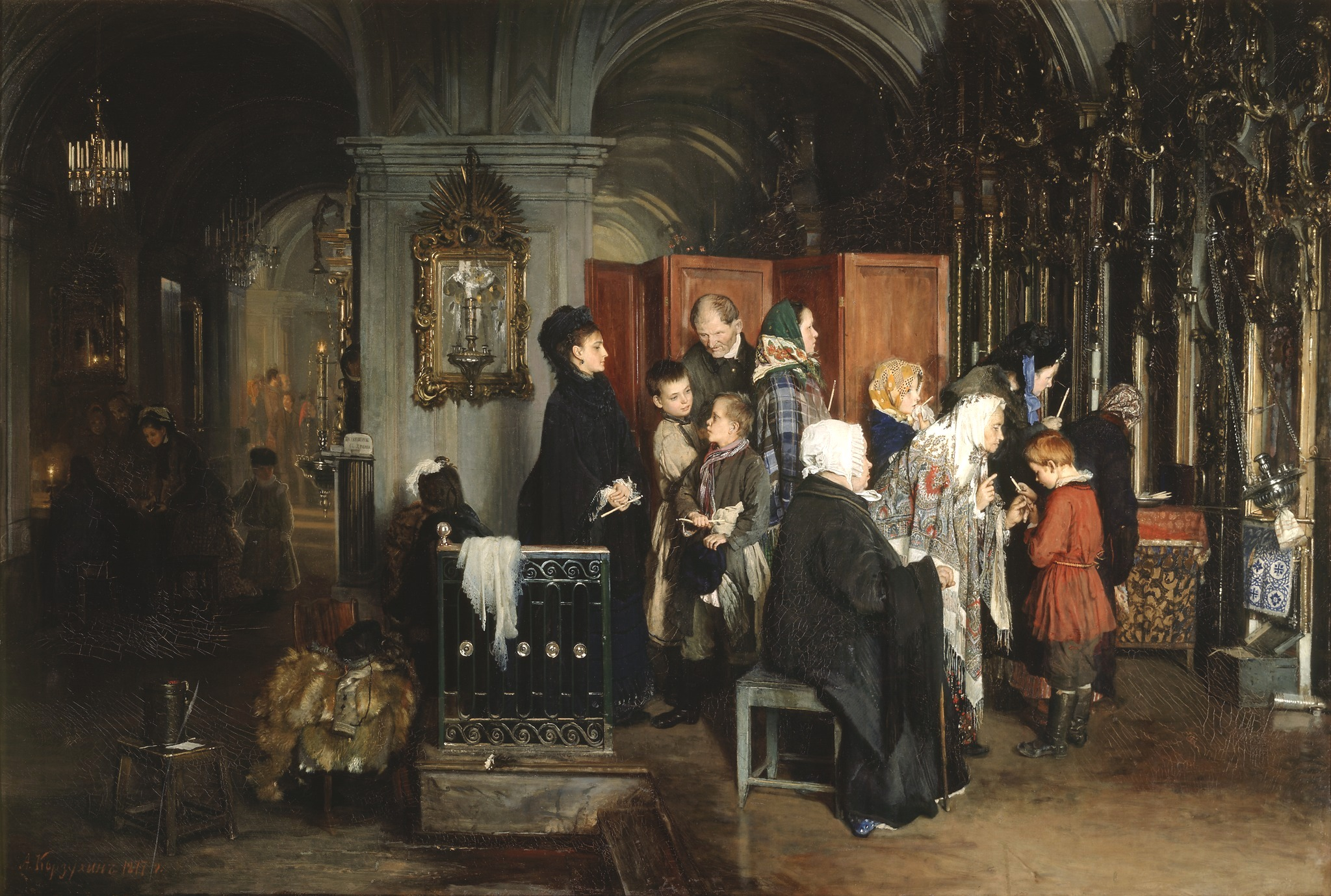
Before Confession (1877), Tretyakov Gallery

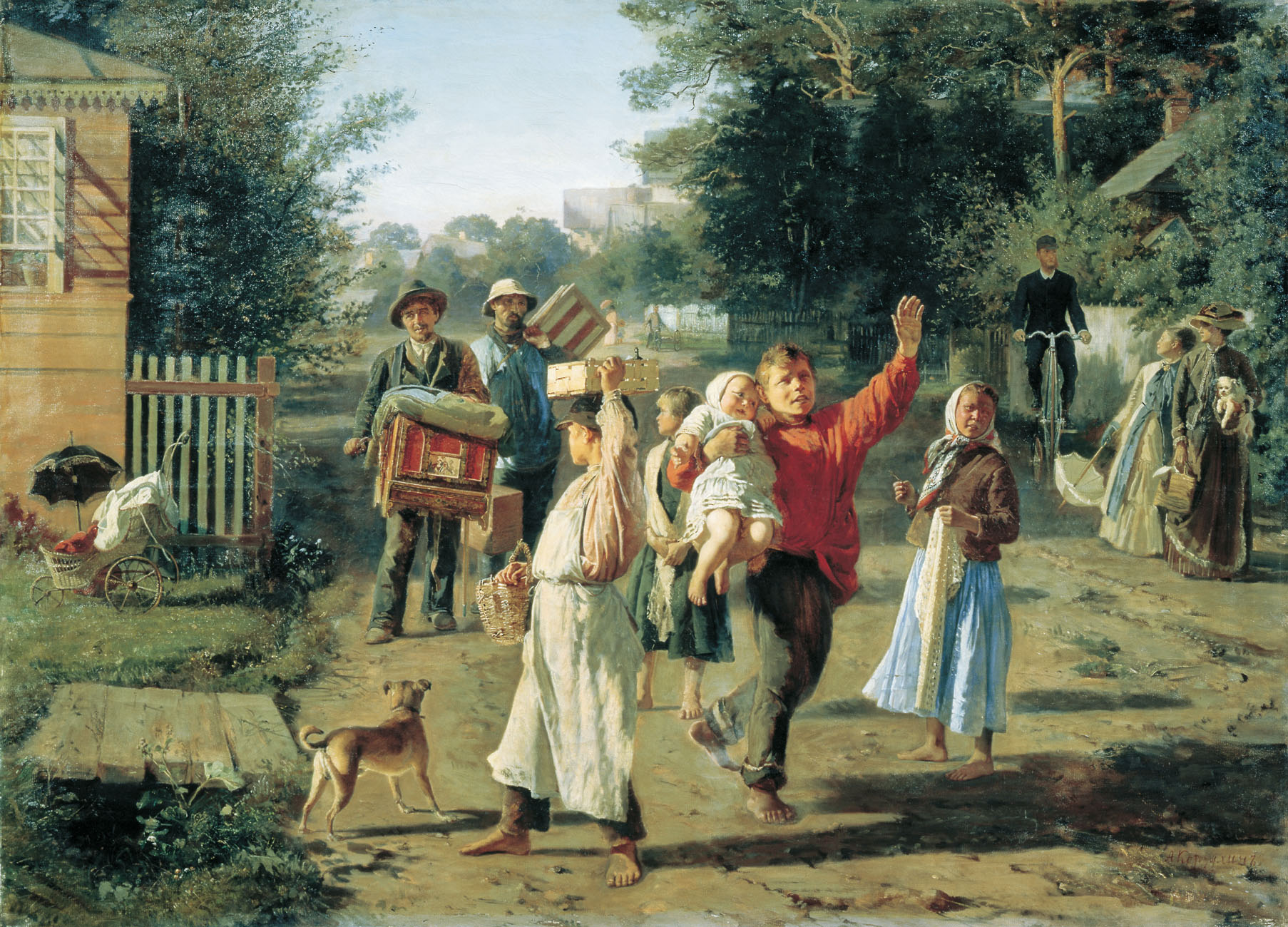
Petrushka Goes! (1888), Radishchev Art Museum

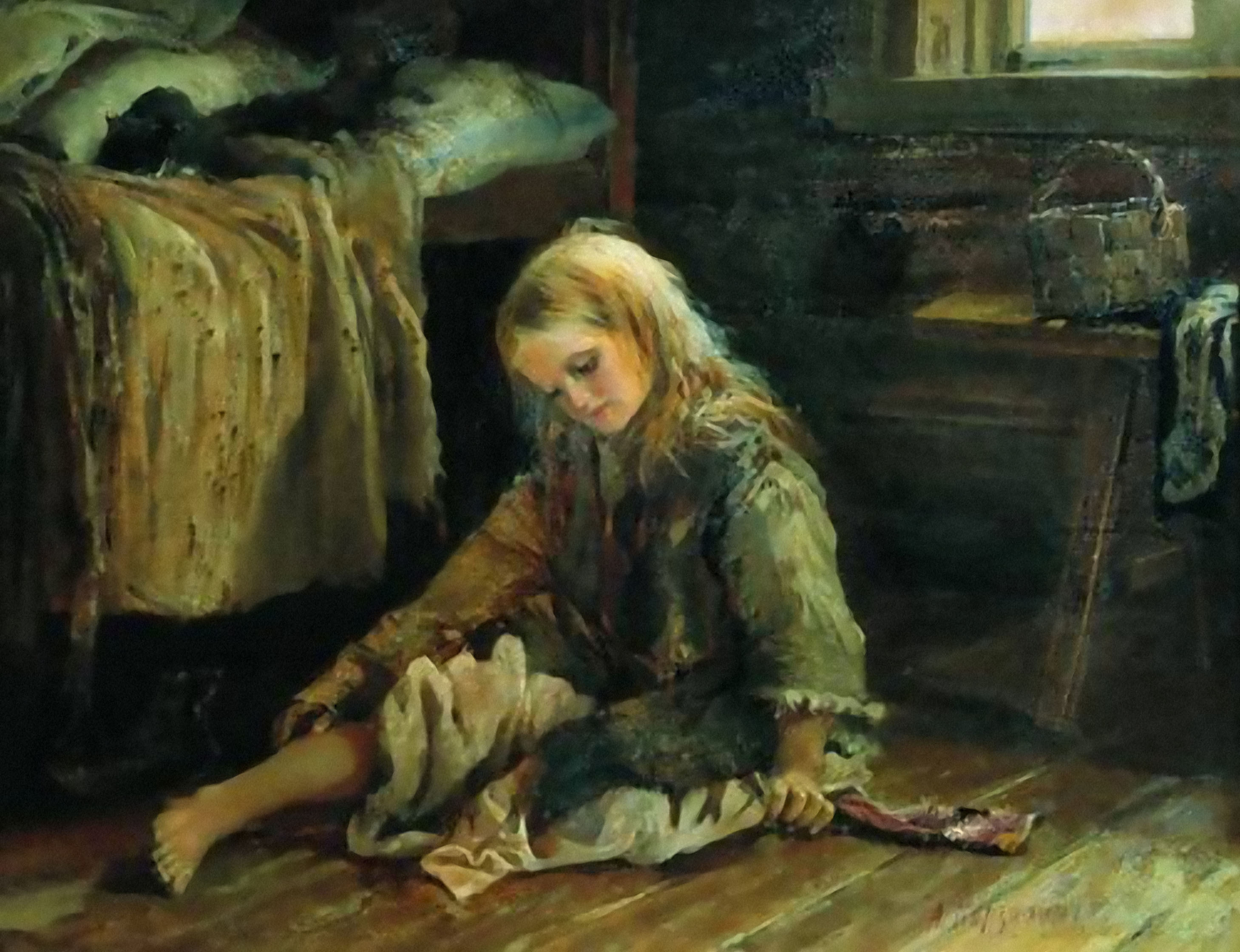
Girl (1877)

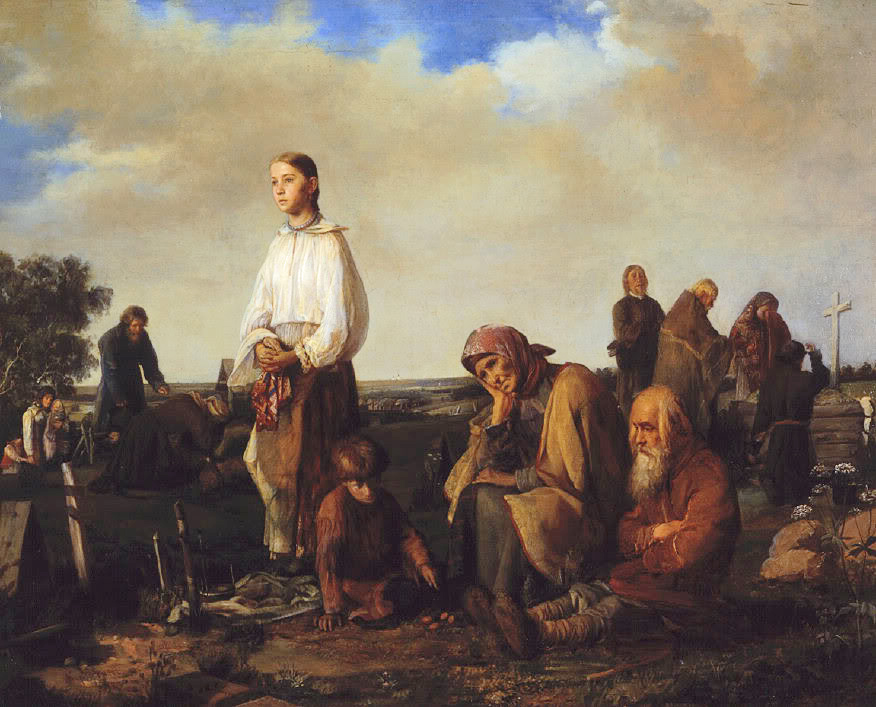
Wake in the Village Cemetery (1865), Russian Museum

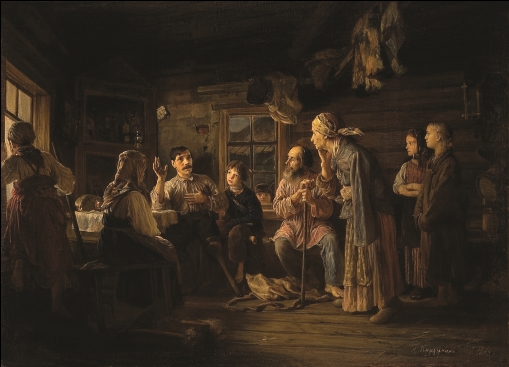
Return from the war (1865), National Art Museum of Azerbaijan

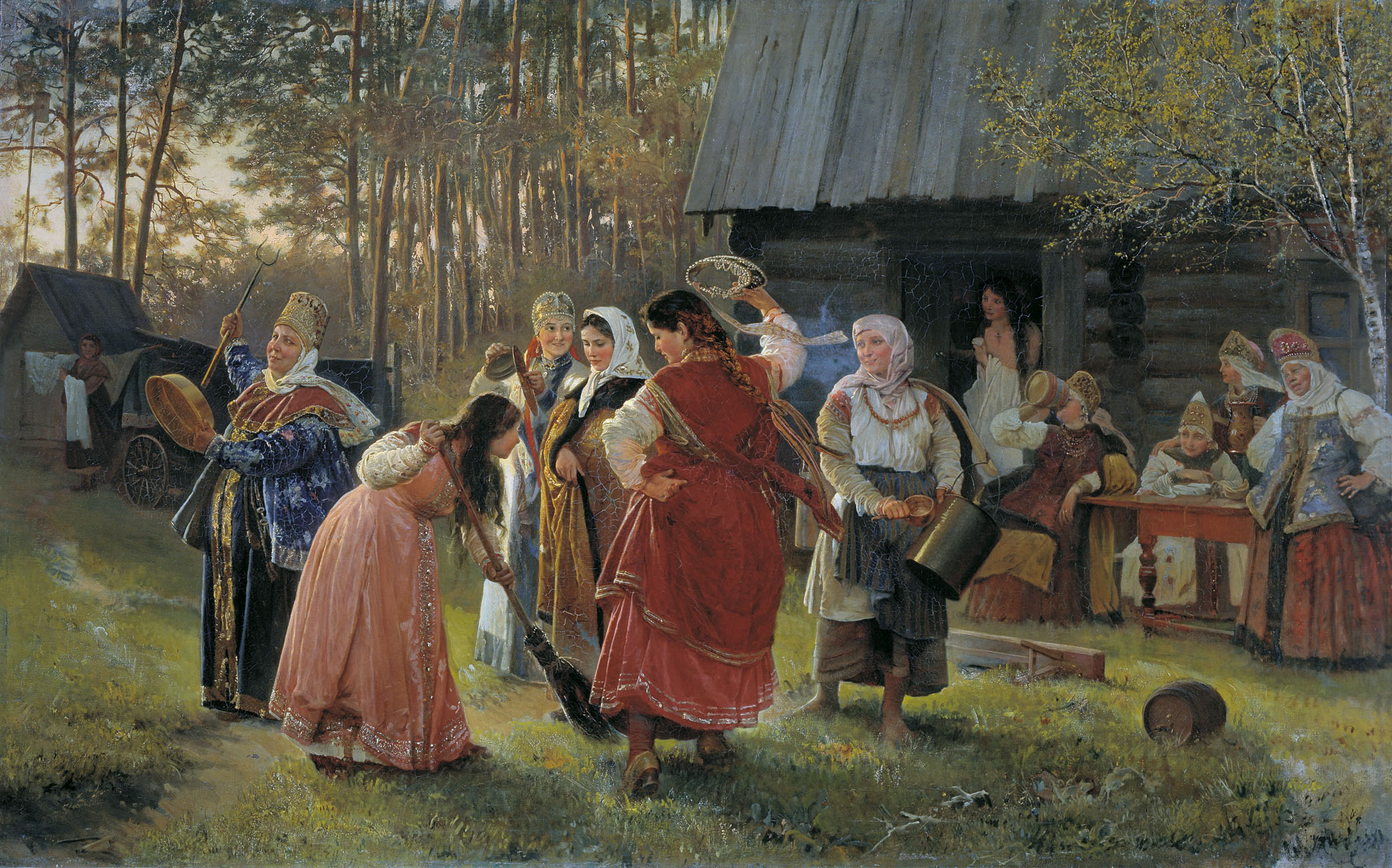
Girlish BBQ (1889)

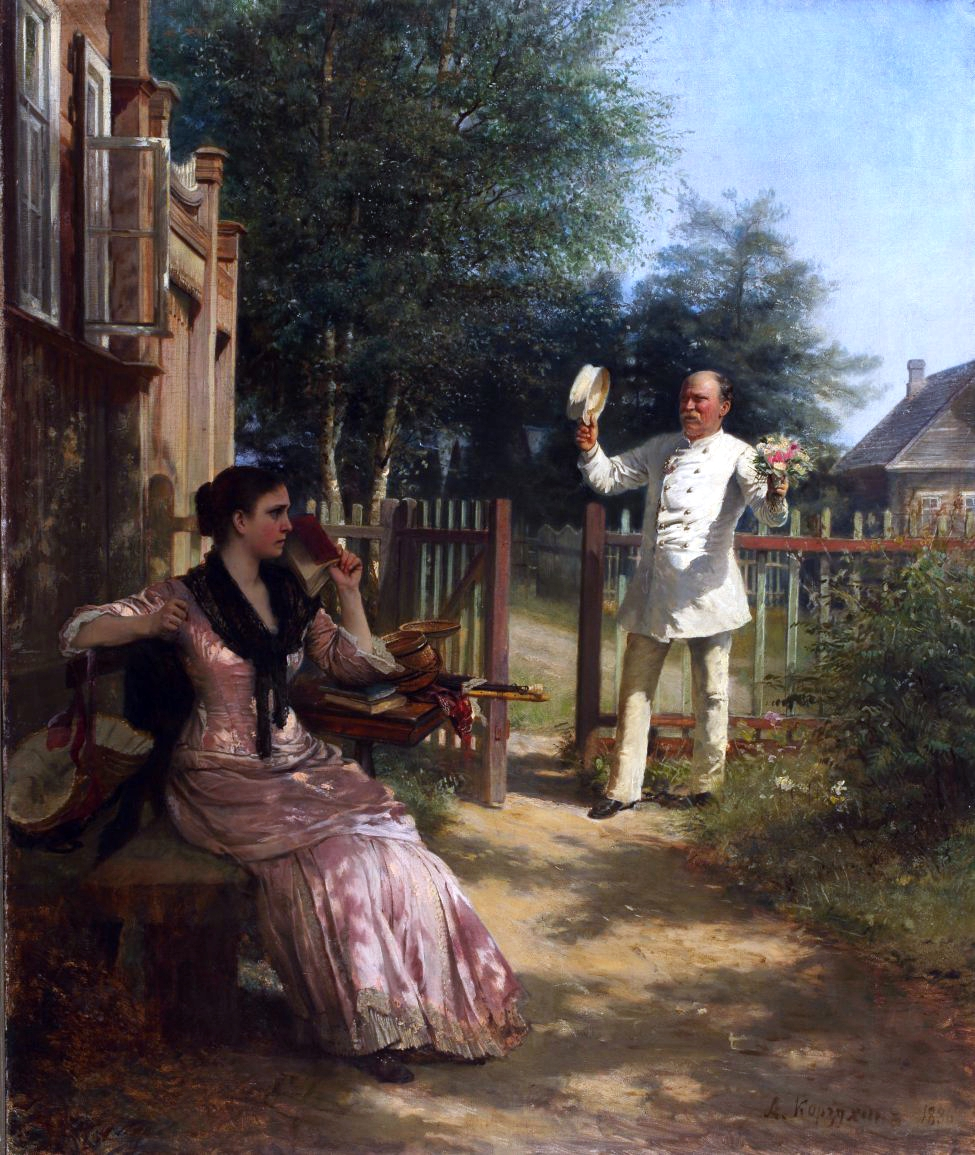
Fed up (1886)

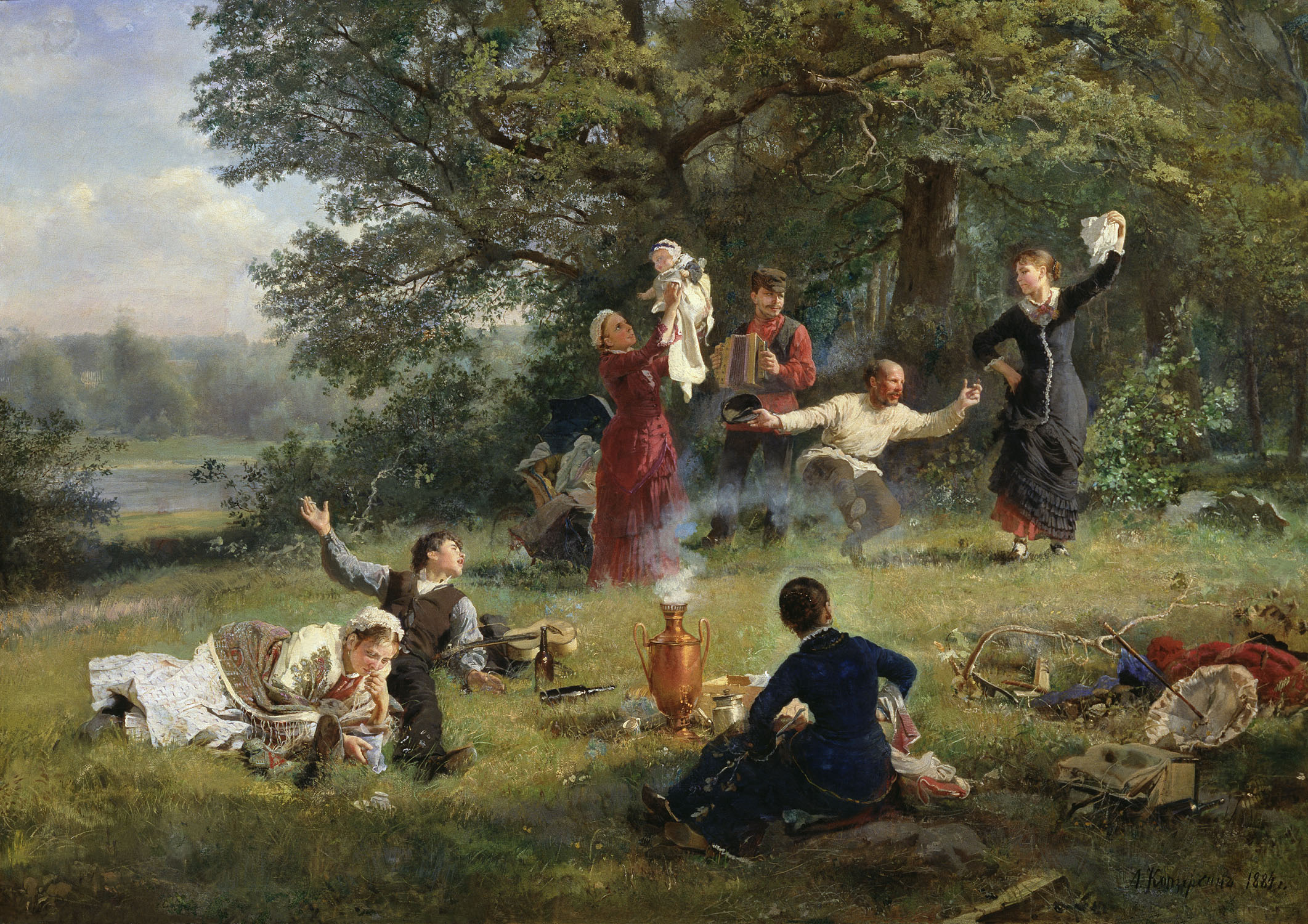
The Sunday (1884)

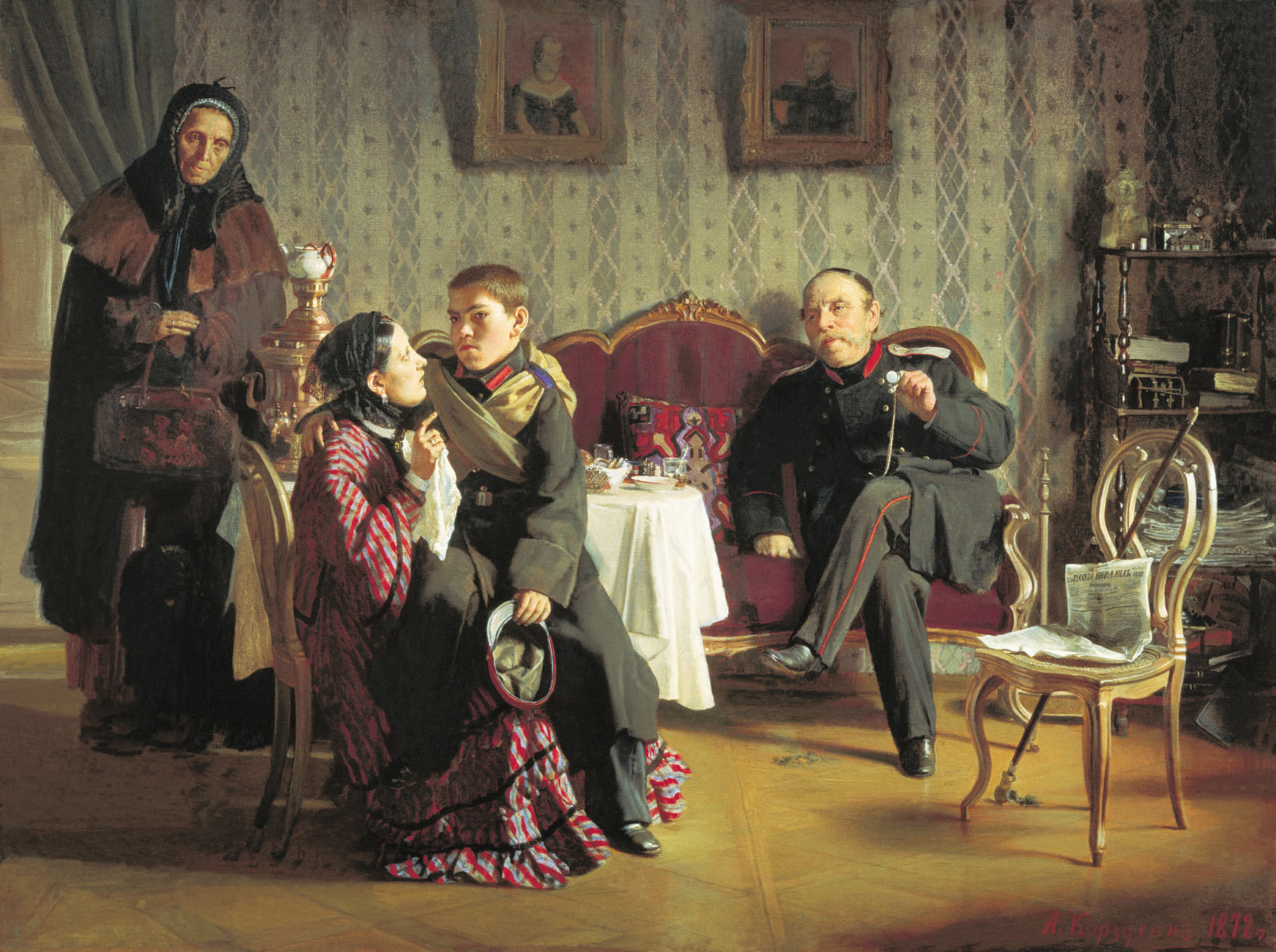
Parting (1872), Tretyakov Gallery

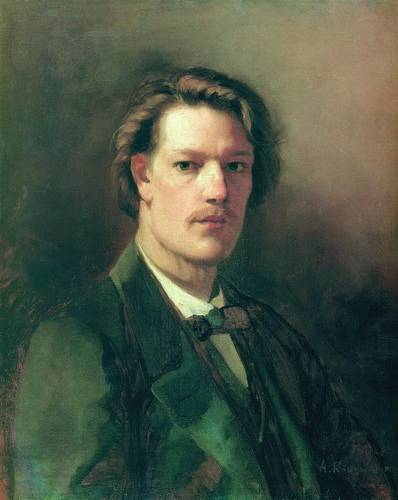
Portrait of the artist M. I. Peskov (1863), Russian Museum
