= Firs Zhuravlev =

Russian painter (1836–1901)

- Фирс Журавлёв
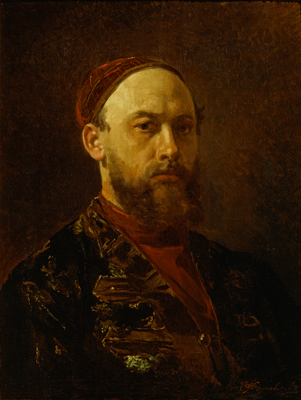
- Self-Portrait, 1870s, oil on canvas; Tretyakov Gallery, Moscow
- Born: December 10, 1836; Saratov, Russia
- Died: September 4, 1901 (aged 64); Saint Petersburg, Russia
- Resting place: Kazan Monastery, Vyshny Volochyok
- Education: Imperial Academy of Arts (1864)
- Known for: Painting
- Elected: Member Academy of Arts (1874)

Firs Sergeyevich Zhuravlev or Zhuravlyov (Russian: Фирс Сергеевич Журавлёв; 22 December 1836 – 17 September 1901) (Note: Or 22 August [O.S. 10 August] 1902, if Suvorin's Russian Calendar of 1903 is to be believed.) was a Russian genre painter.

== Biography ==
He attended the Imperial Academy of Arts, where he studied history painting under Timofey Neff and Fyodor Bruni. In 1863, he became part of the "Revolt of the Fourteen", a group of students who supported Realism and were protesting the Academy's insistence on promoting the Classical style. He joined the others in withdrawing from the school and accepting a designation as "Artist Second-Degree". Soon after, together with Ivan Kramskoi, he helped to found the Artel of Artists, a group of painters who formed a sort of commune, sharing workshops and maintaining a common household on Vasilyevsky Island. He also taught drawing at the Society for the Encouragement of the Arts (1866, 1871–72). From 1862 to 1874, he was under police surveillance for alleged ties to revolutionary groups, possibly due to the social criticism inherent in many of his portrayals of peasant life.

His first exhibition at the Academy came in 1868 and, six years later, a display of his work earned him the title of "Academician". During 1888 and 1889, he participated in showings by the "Association of Travelling Art Exhibitions" (Peredvizhniki), but never became a formal member of the group. He also participated in the Centennial Exposition in Philadelphia, the Exposition Universelle (1889) and the All-Russia Exhibition 1896.

In addition to his oil paintings, he helped to decorate the Cathedral of Christ the Saviour in Moscow, and the Nativity Cathedral, Riga, and created mosaics for the Church of the Savior on Blood.

== Selected paintings ==
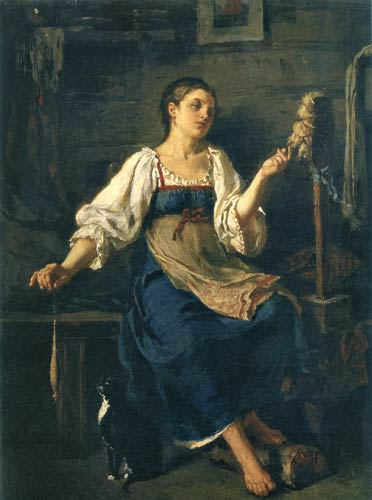
The Spinner (1864)

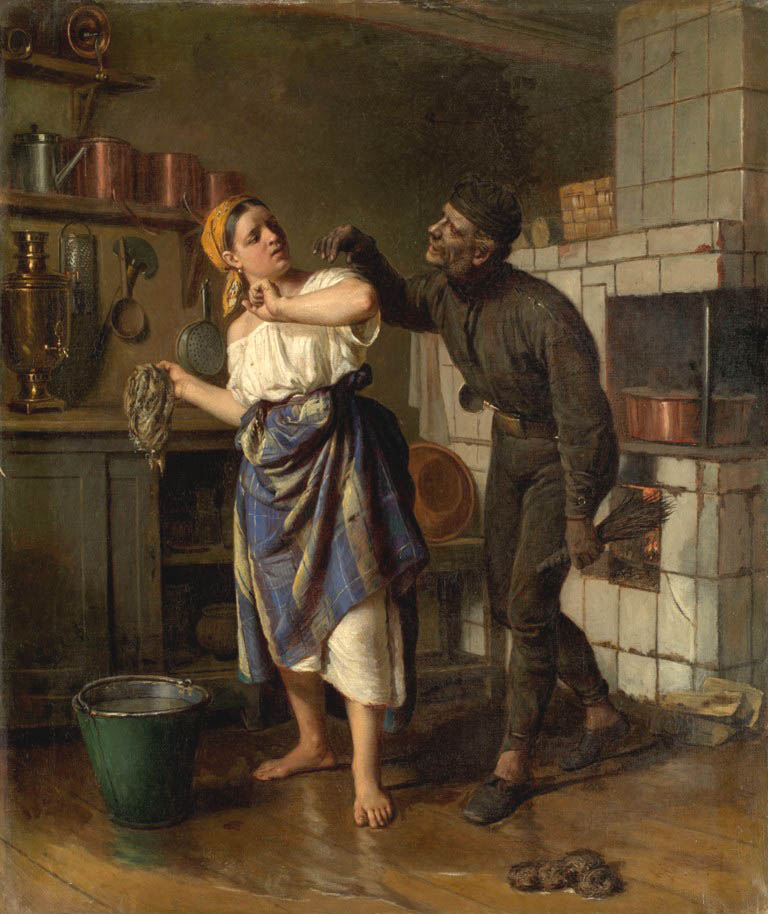
The Chimneysweep
(date unknown)

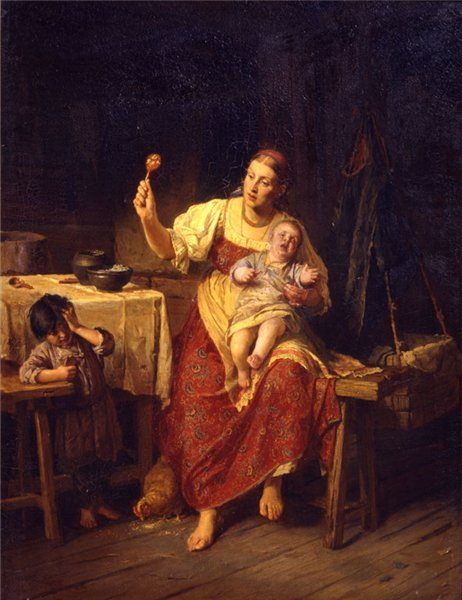
The Stepmother (1874)

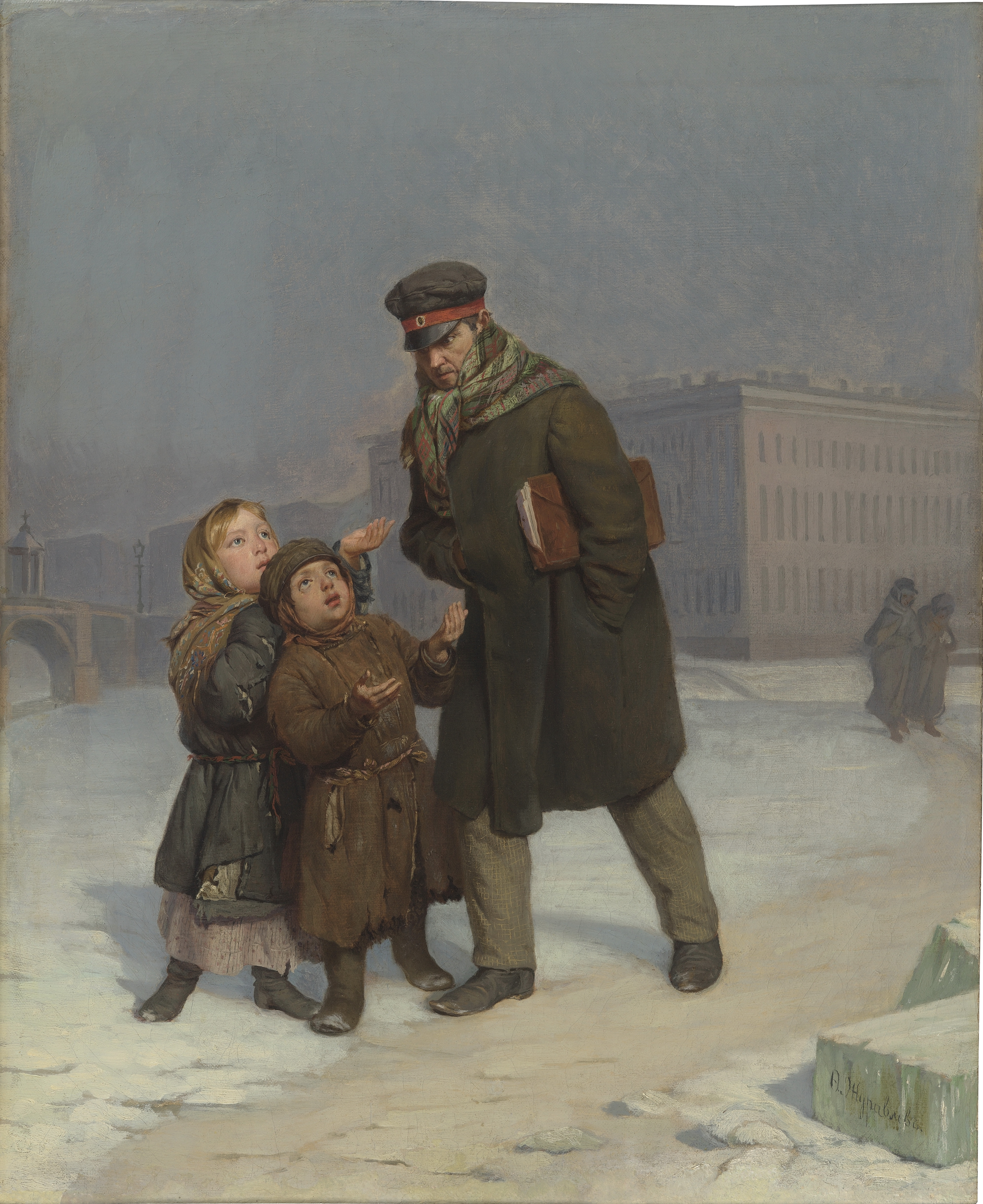
Child Beggars (1870)

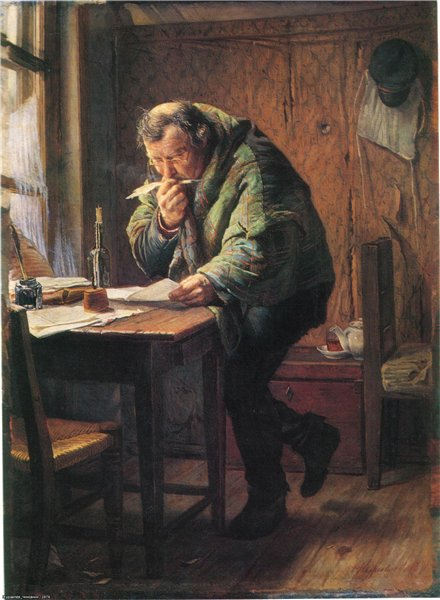
The Clerk (1884)
