= Nikolai Dmitriev-Orenburgsky =

Russian painter

- Николай Дмитриев-Оренбургский
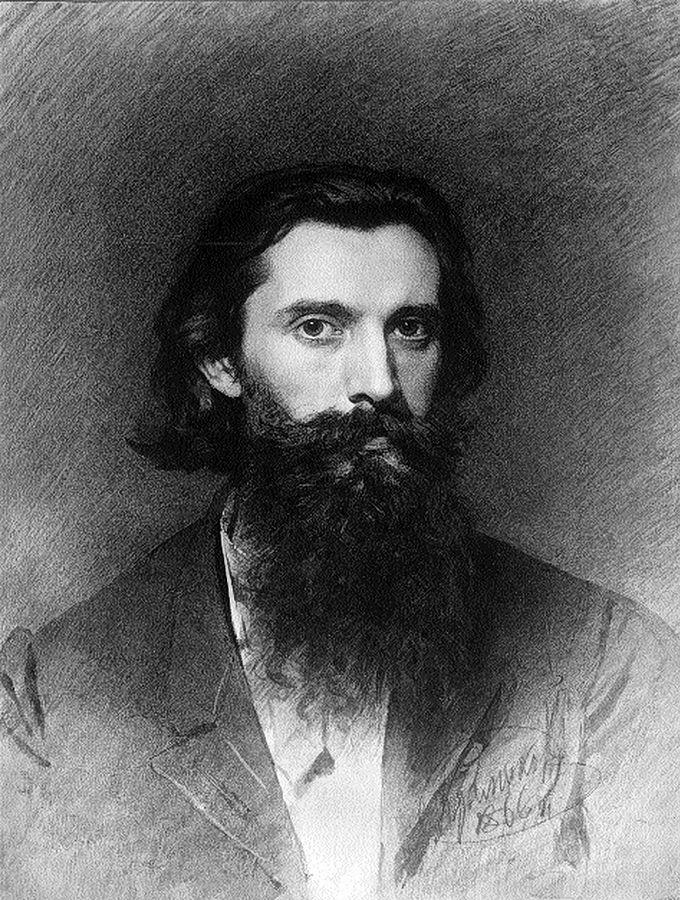
- Ivan Kramskoi, Nikolai Dmitriev-Orenburgsky, 1866, sauce and black chalk on paper; Russian Museum, Saint Petersburg
- Born: Nikolai Dmitrievich Dmitriev; 1 April 1837; Nizhny Novgorod
- Died: 21 April 1898 (aged 61); Saint Petersburg
- Resting place: Smolensky Cemetery, Saint Petersburg
- Education: Member Academy of Arts (1868); Professor by rank (1883)
- Known for: Painting

Nikolai Dmitrievich Dmitriev-Orenburgsky (Russian: Николай Дмитриевич Дмитриев-Оренбургский; 1 November 1838 or 1 April 1837 – 21 April 1898) was a battle and genre painter from the Russian Empire who added to his surname, to distinguish him from other artists Dmitrievs, epithet: Orenburgsky. He lived and worked in Paris from 1875 to 1885.

== Biography ==
Orenburgsky was one of the fourteen students who decided in 1863 to leave the Imperial Academy of Arts as part of the Revolt of the Fourteen and to form an independent artistic society, the Petersburg Cooperative of Artists (Artel), which preceded the Association of Travelling Art Exhibits, the basis of the peredvizhniki circle.

Orenburgsky is known for the military themes that predominated his work after he participated in the Russo-Turkish War of 1877-78, and for paintings depicting Russian village life (the lives of simple people, the peasants, in specific). In the project documenting The World's Columbian Exposition of 1893, in which some of his Russian village life paintings were exhibited, it is so commented of Dmitriev-Orenburgsky's work: "A noticeable feature is the air of sadness depicted in scenes of Russian life, even in those which portray its more cheerful phases. Thus in "Sunday in a Village", by Dmitrieff-Orenbursky, where peasants are trying to make merry, we can see that they are only trying, and with indifferent success", and it is commented furthermore: "To stand before this canvas is to have very much the sensation of being set down in a Russian village on a Sunday afternoon".

Dmitriev-Orenburgsky's work is collected and exhibited, inter alia, in the Hermitage Museum, The Russian Museum, the Military Historical Museum and The Museum of Russian Art.

== Works ==
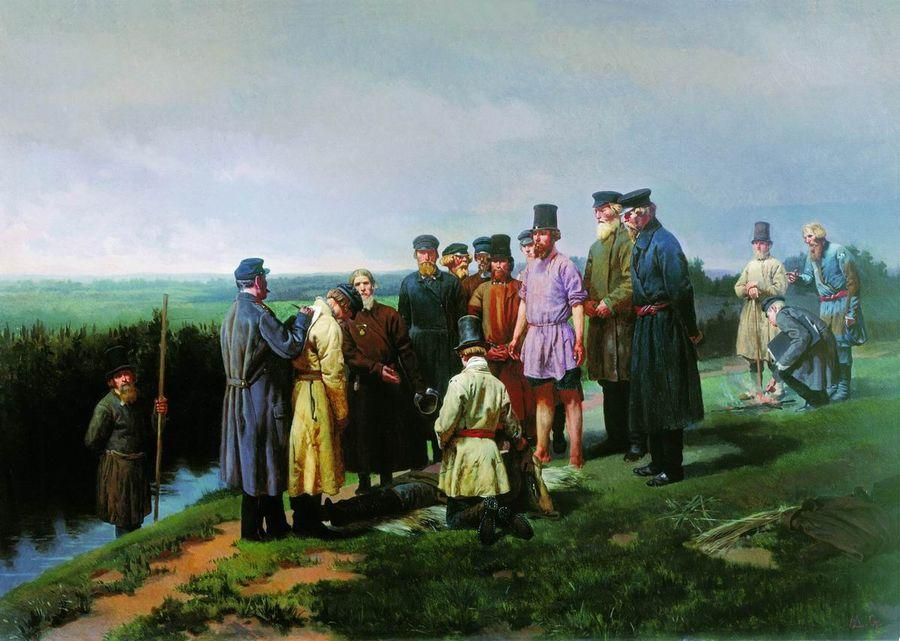
Drowned in a Village (1868, in the State Russian Museum, Saint Petersburg)

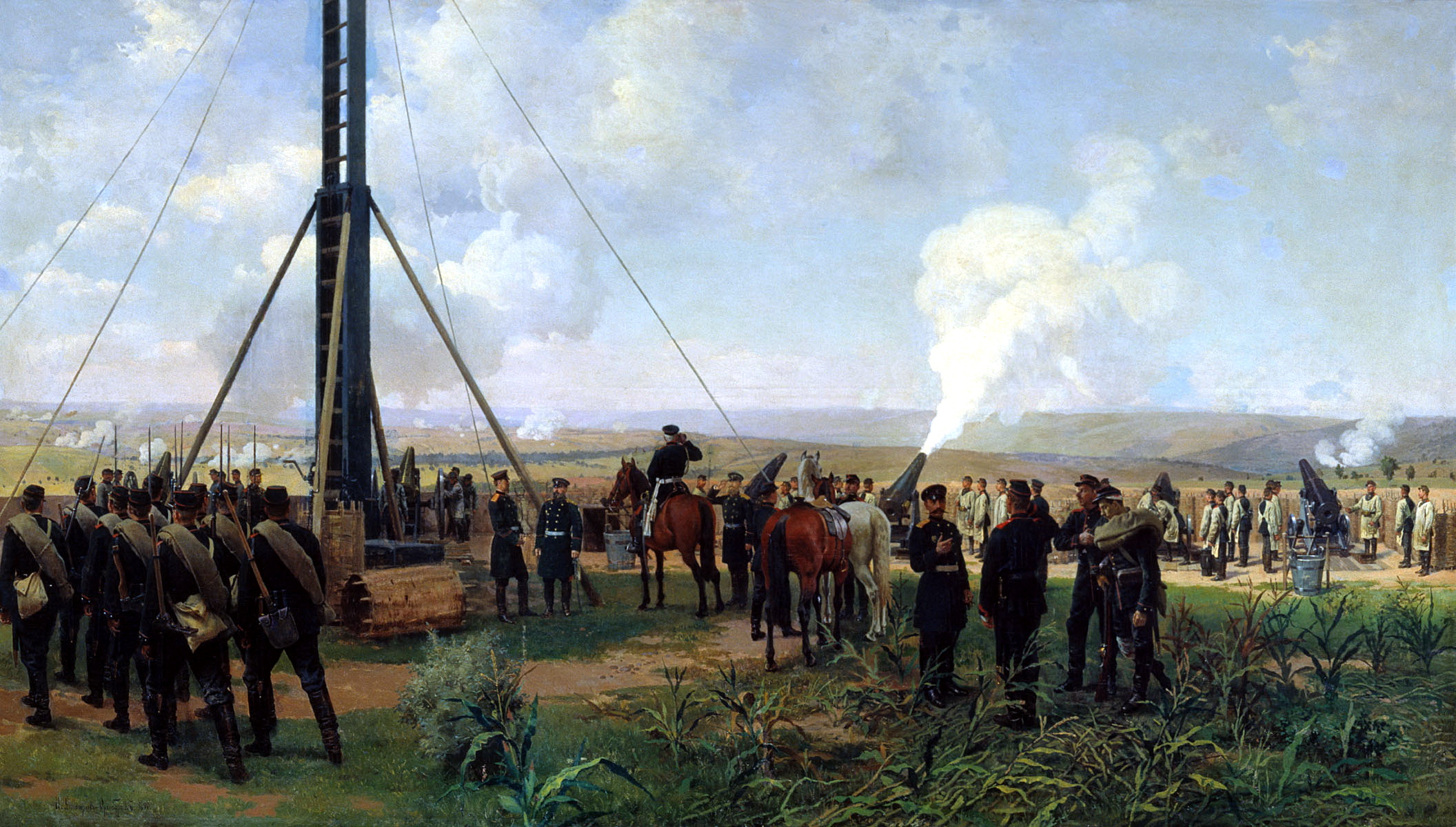
Siege of Plevna: Artillery Battle (1880, in the Artillery Museum, Saint Petersburg)

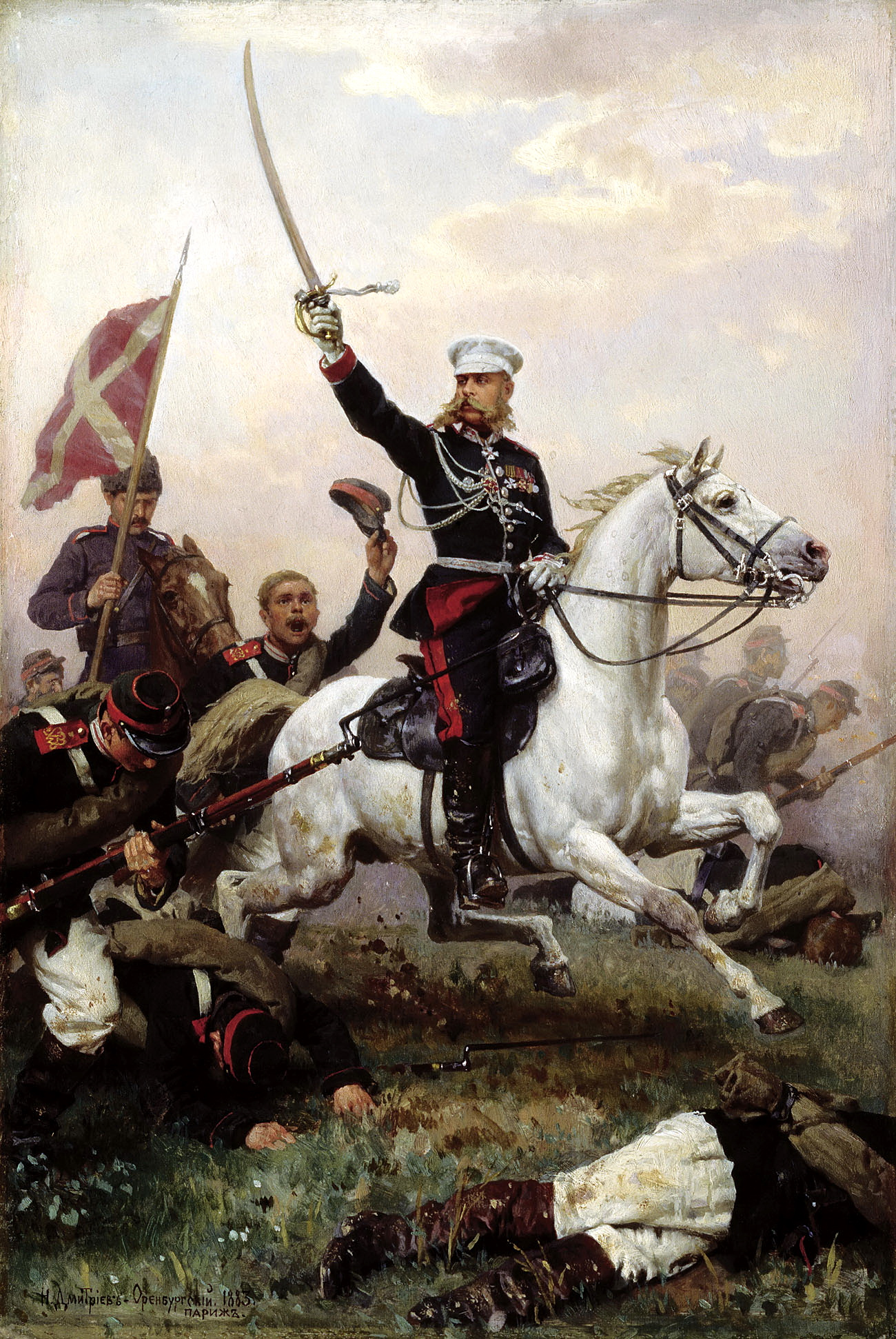
General M. D. Skobelev on his horse in the Russo-Turkish war 1877/78 (1883, in the Irkutsk Regional Art Museum)

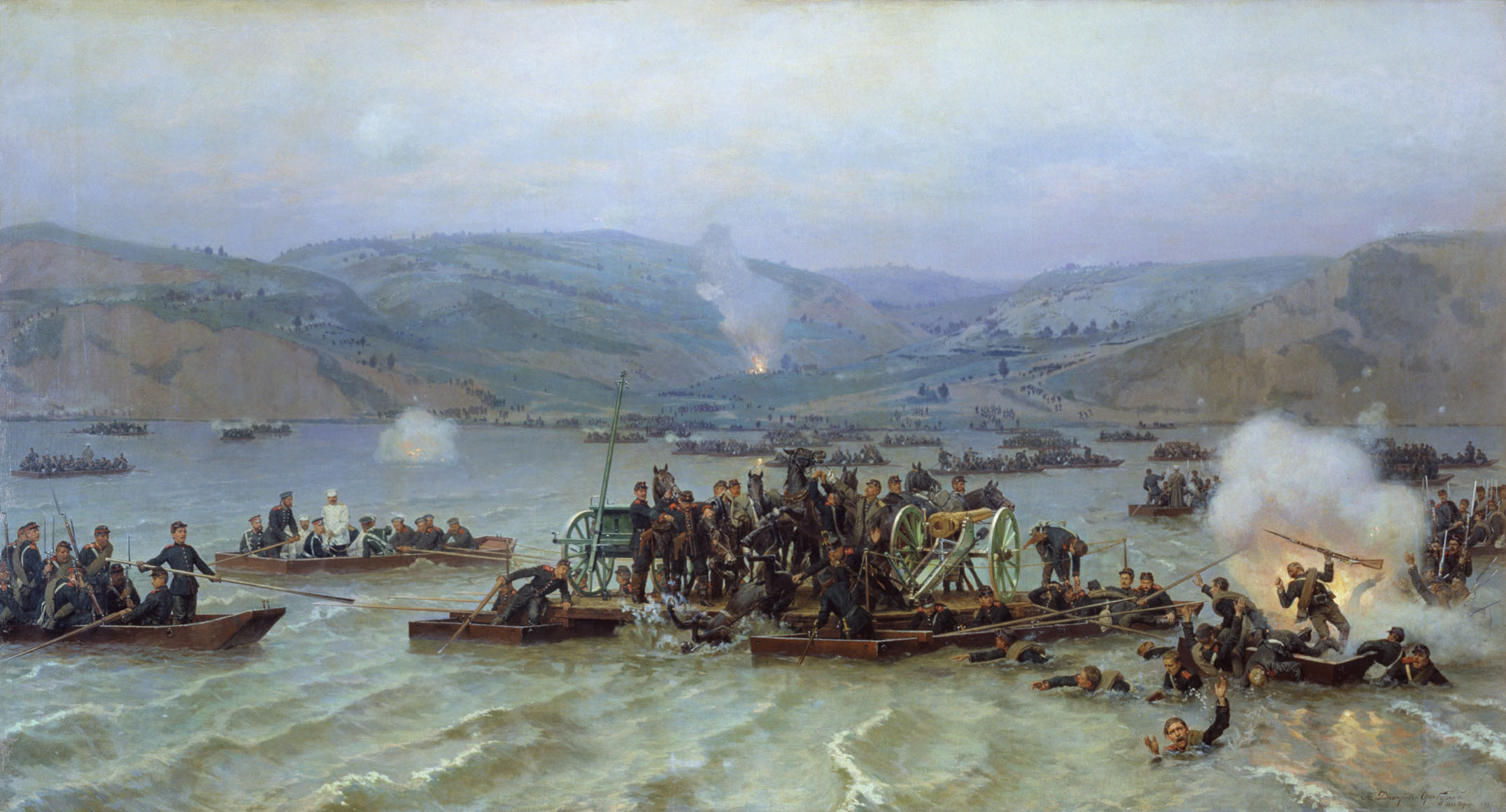
Crossing of the Russian army across the Danube (1883, in the Artillery Museum, Saint Petersburg)

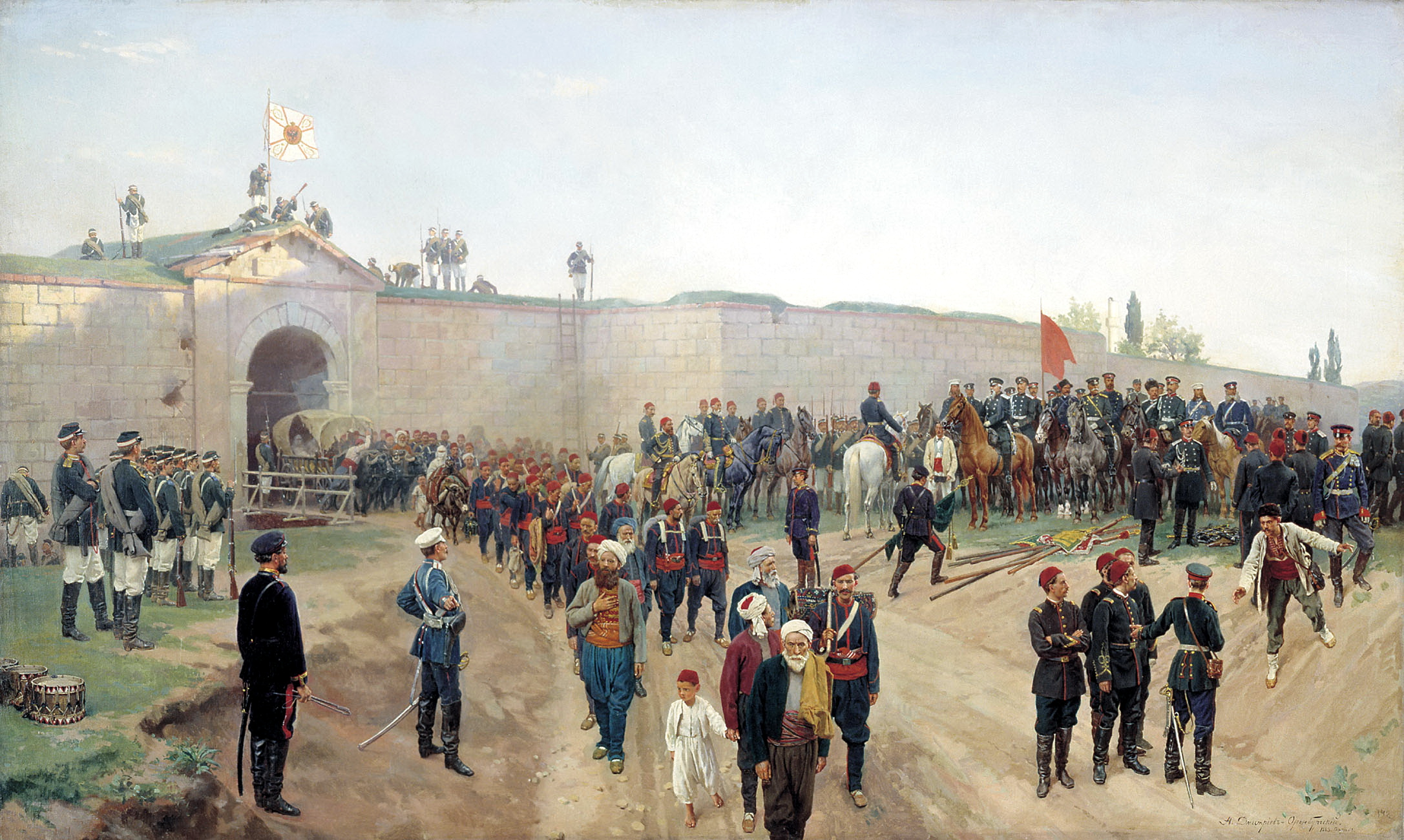
Delivery of the fortress Nikopol (1883, in the Artillery Museum, Saint Petersburg)

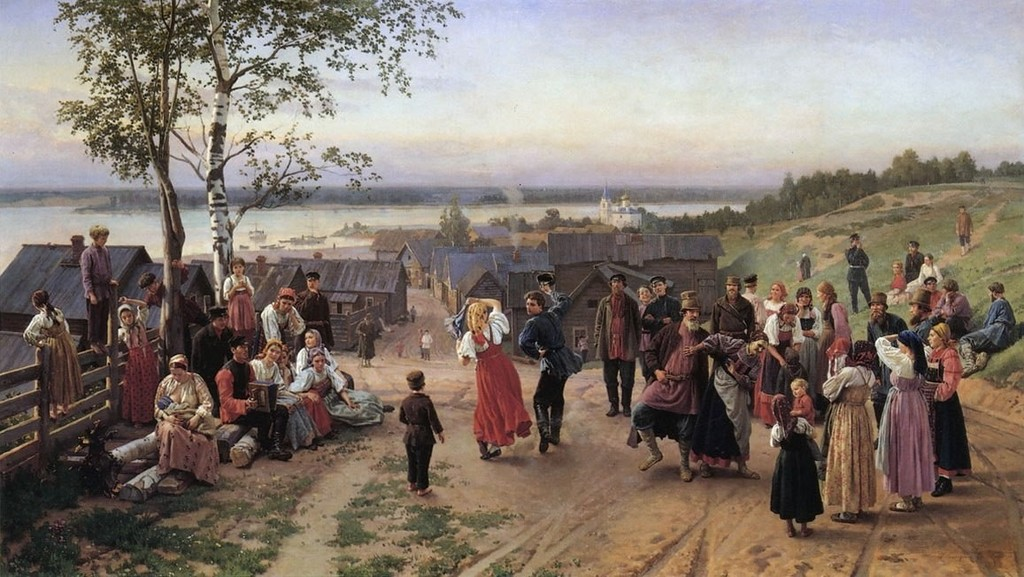
Sunday in a Village (1884)

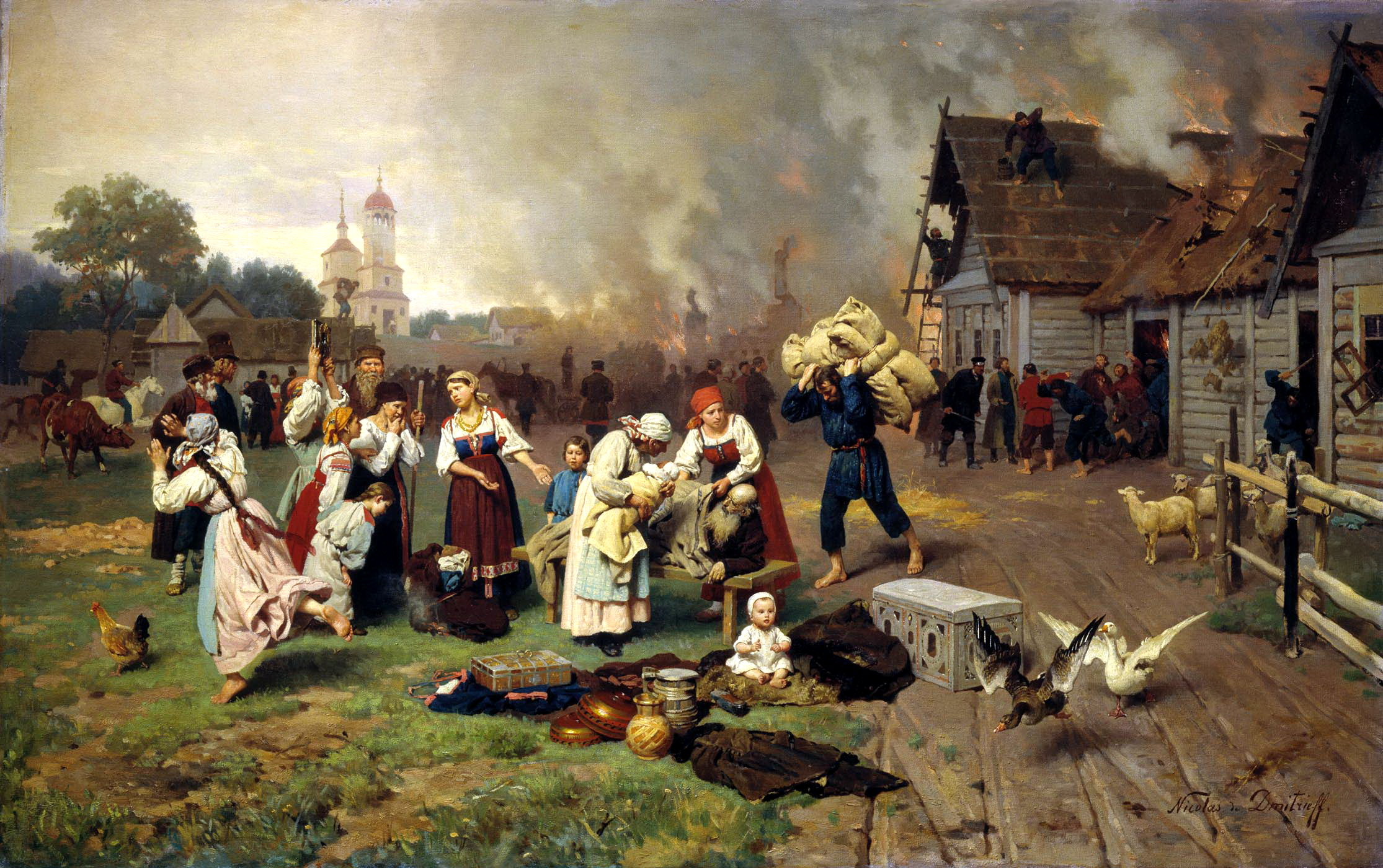
Fire in a Village (1885, in the State Russian Museum)

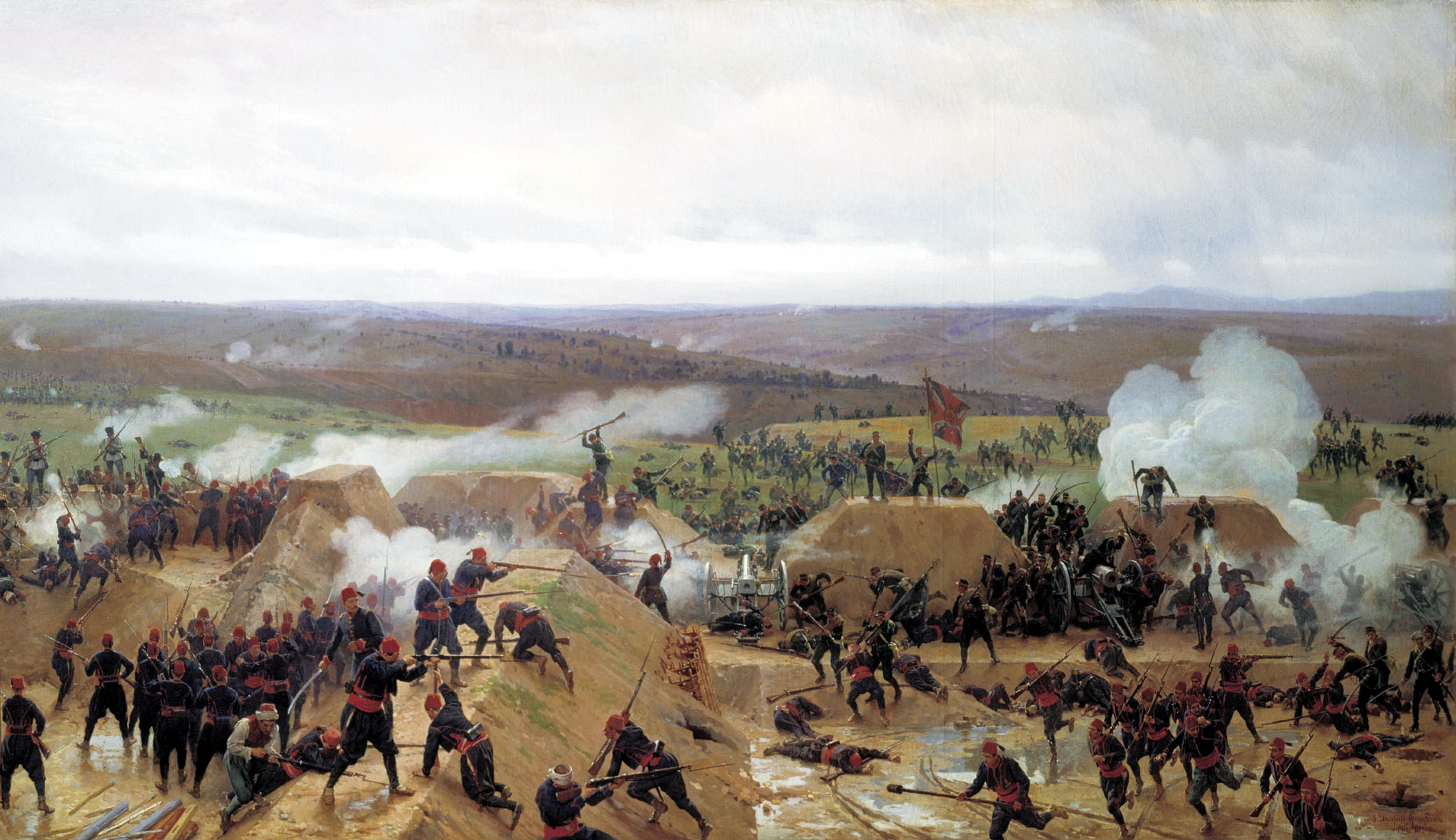
Siege of Plevna: Capture Redoubt (1885, in the Artillery Museum, Saint Petersburg)

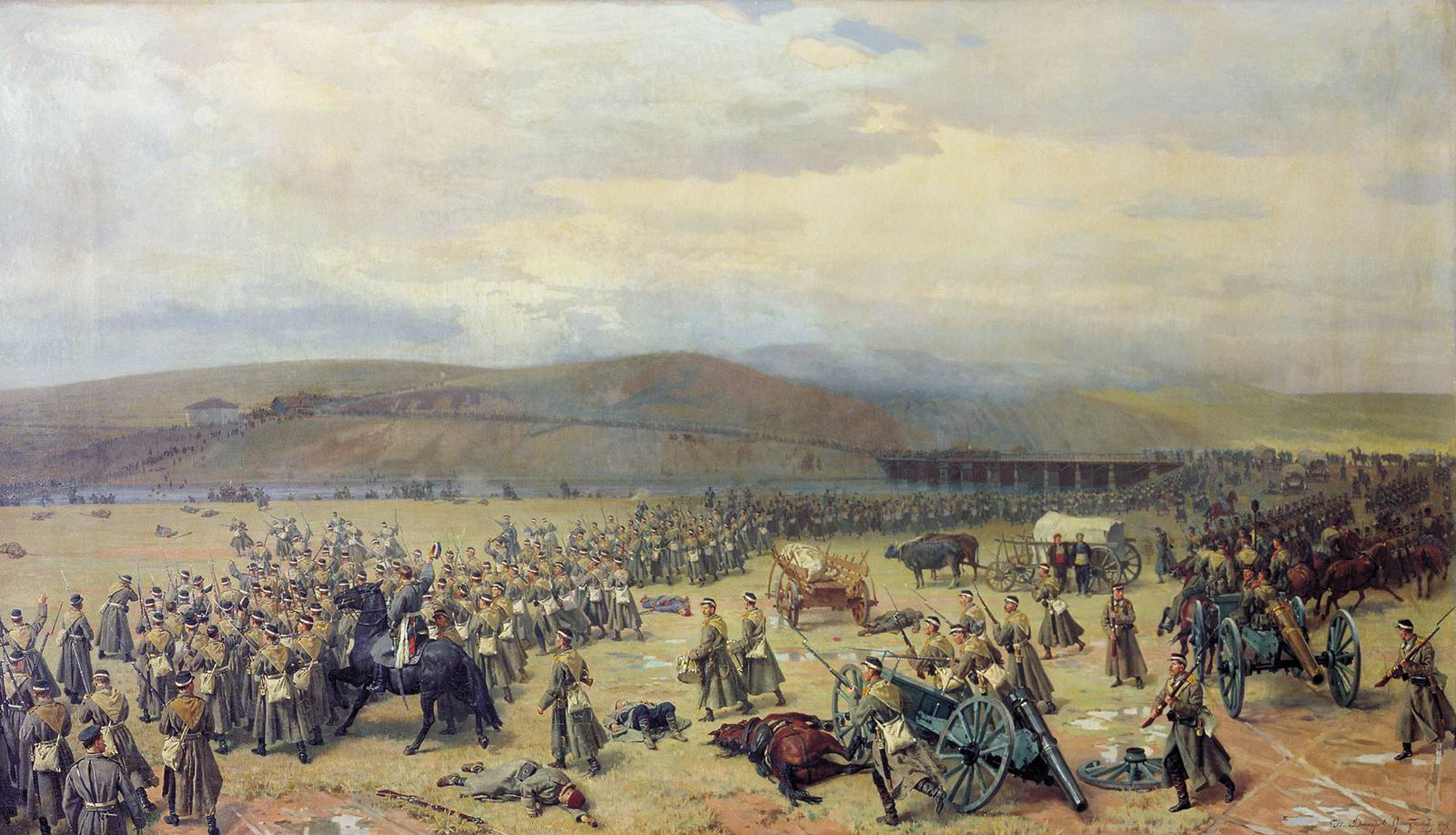
The last battle at Plevna November 28, 1877 (1889, in the Artillery Museum, Saint Petersburg)

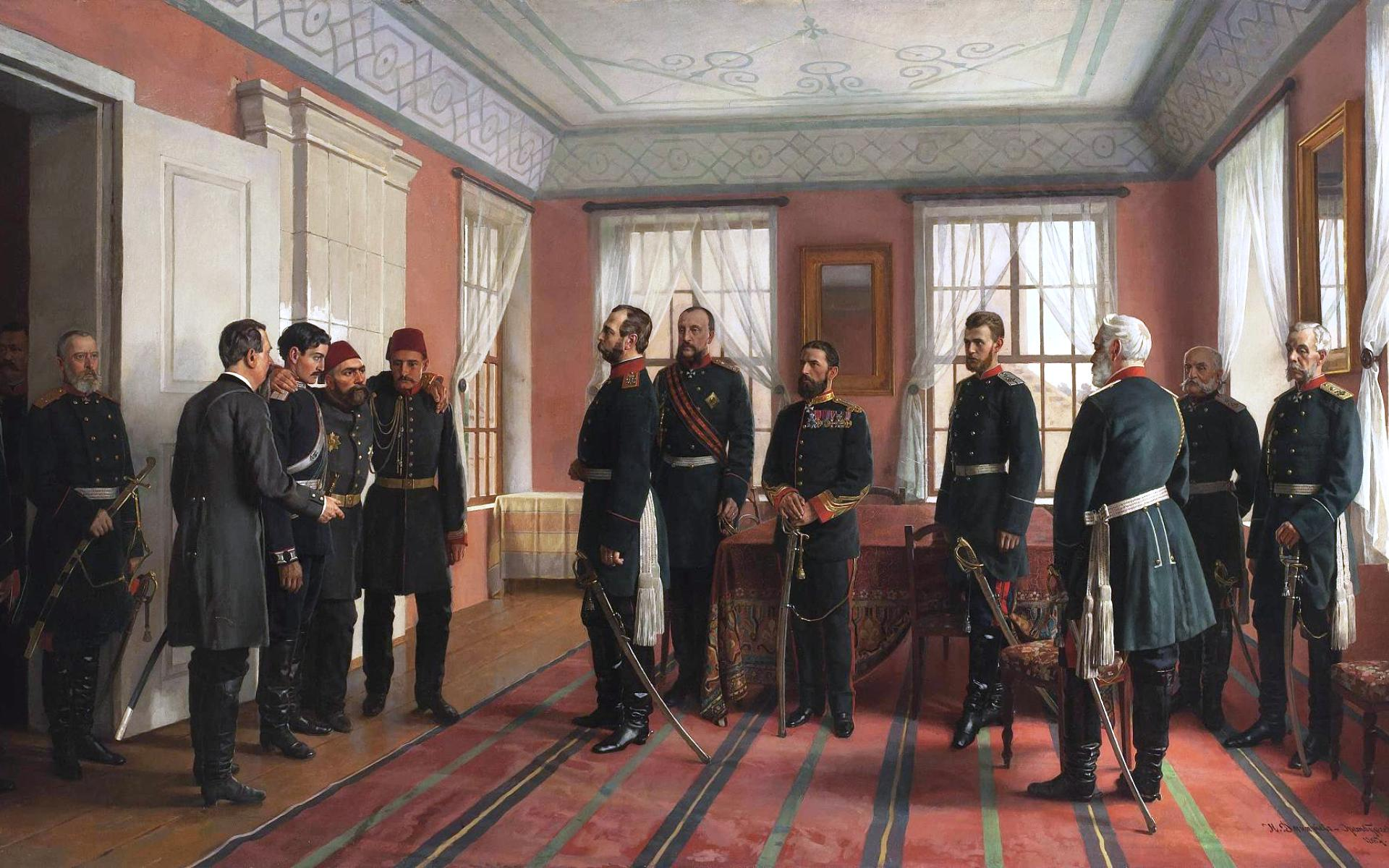
Siege of Plevna: Presentation of the captive Osman Pasha to Alexander II (1898, in the Hermitage Museum, Saint Petersburg)
