= Revolt of the Fourteen =

1863 protest of art students in Russia

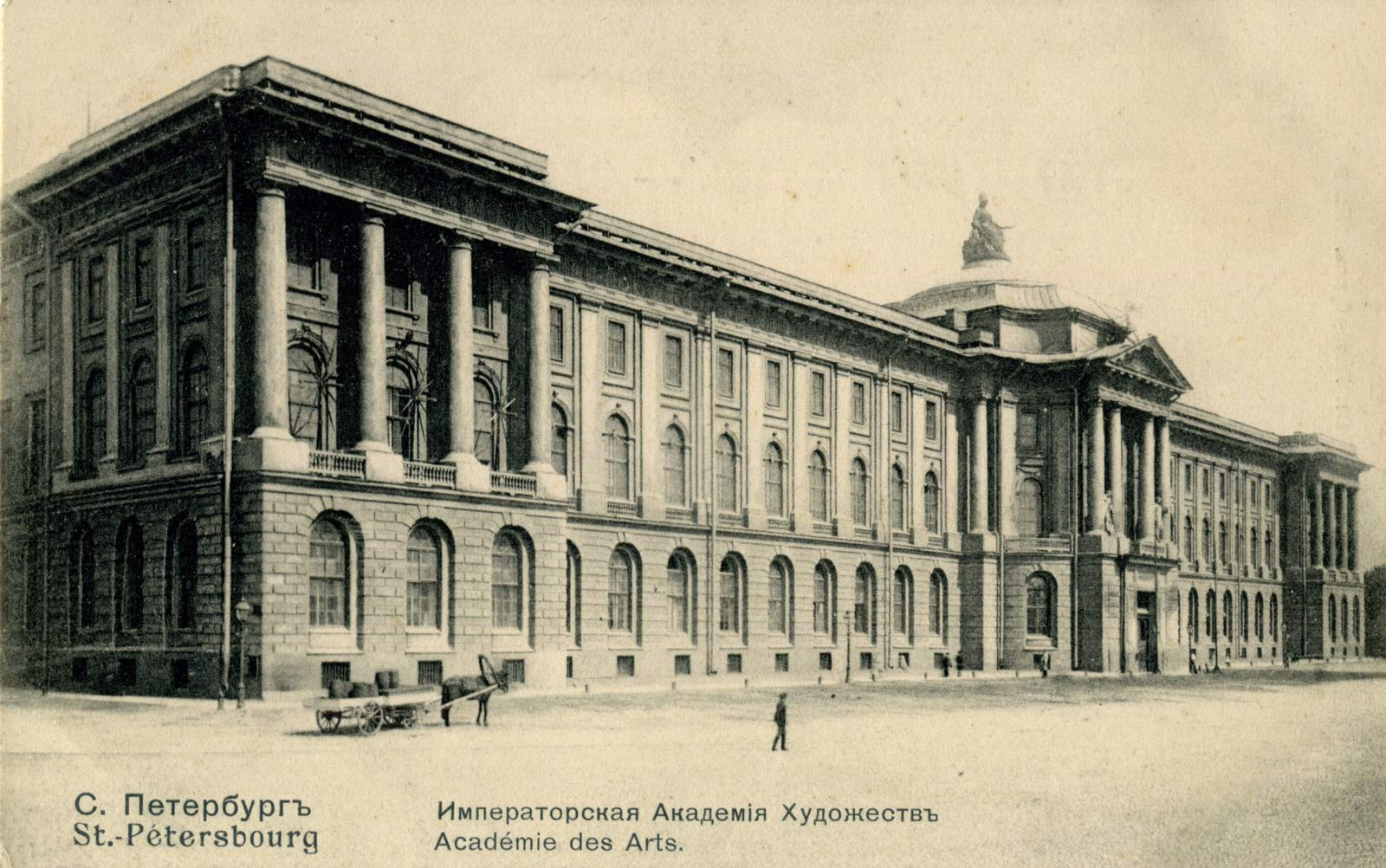
- Imperial Academy of Arts
- Native name: Бунт четырнадцати
- Date: November 9, 1863
- Location: Imperial Academy of Arts, Saint Petersburg, Russian Empire
- Organised by: Ivan Kramskoi
- Participants: Bogdan Wenig, Firs Zhuravlev, Alexander Morozov, Kirill Lemokh, Ivan Kramskoi, Alexander Litovchenko, Konstantin Makovsky, Nikolai Dmitriev, Nikolai Petrov, Vasily Kreitan, Mikhail Peskov, Nikolay Shustov, Alexei Korzukhin, Alexander Grigoriev

The Revolt of the Fourteen (Russian: Бунт четырнадцати, romanized: Bunt chetyrnadtsati) was the refusal of 14 top students in the Imperial Academy of Arts of the Russian Empire to participate in a competition that was held on the 100th anniversary of the Academy on 9 November 1863. The revolt, which was led by the realist painter Ivan Kramskoi, was a response to the academy's refusal to give the competitors a free choice of art subject in the competition. The subsequent withdrawal of artists from the academy was the first demonstration by realist artists against the classical style that was popular in 19th-century Russia and is sometimes cited as the source of realism in Russian art.

== Background ==
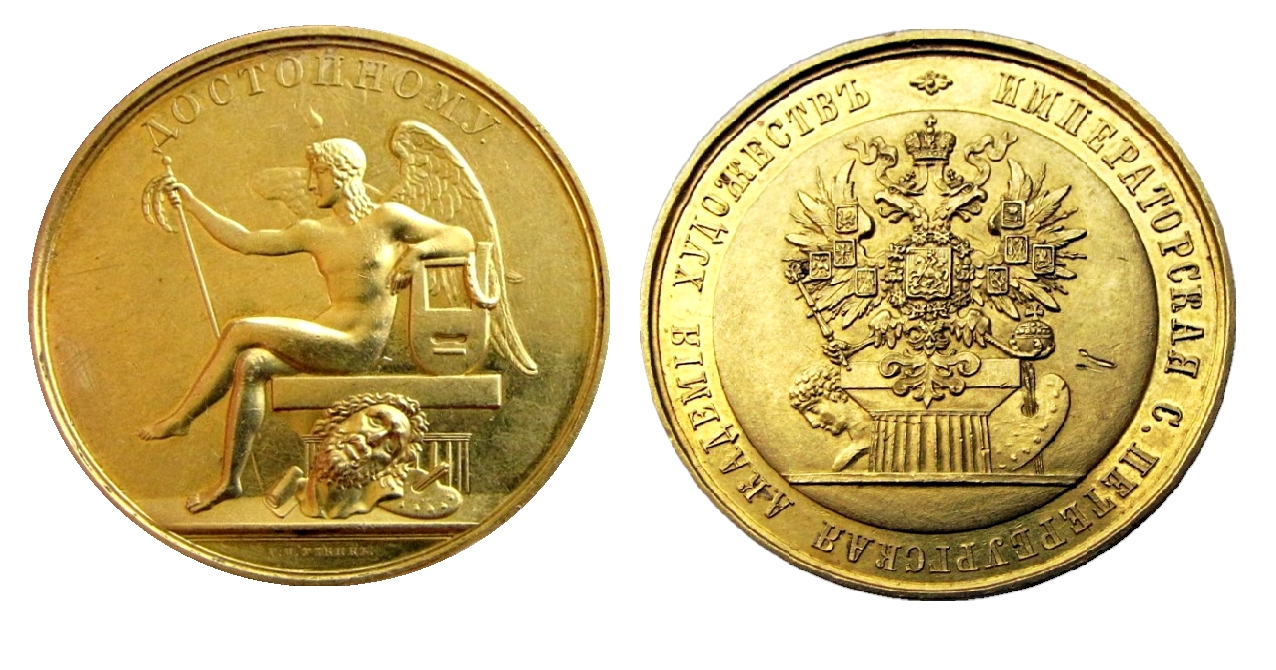
Grand Gold Medal of the Academy

A number of Academy graduate students who completed the full course of study were allowed to compete for the Grand Gold Medal, an honour that carried a six-year fellowship to work in Italy or France. Contestants had to create their compositions on a given topic, usually one the Academic Council had gleaned from classical antiquity and the mythological repertoire. When the theme of the competition was announced, the contestants had to stay in isolated workshops for a full day, and had 24 hours to plan their entries and draw a sketch of a future picture. The Academy Council approved the sketch, which was not allowed to be changed.

The Academy had been criticised for its use of "antiquated" subjects for years so in 1863, it announced contestants would be given general themes such as joy, anger, and longing instead of explicit subjects to give students a better opportunity to demonstrate their abilities and inclinations. The rendering specifics were left to the contestant. The Academy opened up the subject matter for historical painters. Genre painters had always had almost a free choice of subject. This announcement, however, also said: "Contestants will be allowed to participate only once, and for all the contestants there will be only one golden medal of the first class". To further complicate matters, an unusually large number of graduate students qualified for the contest that year. In previous years, fewer contestants competed for more medals, and could compete again the next year if unsuccessful. In 1863, the competition promised to be very tough; the chances for success were slimmer and failure would be final.

== Initial protests ==
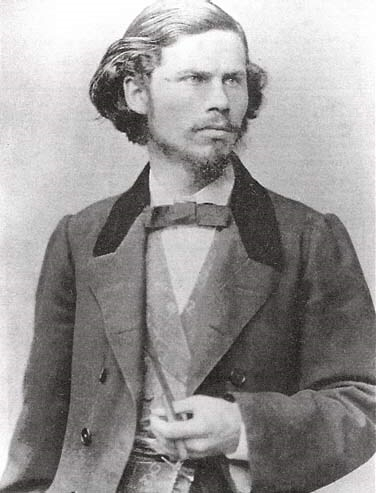
Ivan Kramskoi. 1860s

The competitors decided the new rules put genre and historical painters in an unequal position so on 8 October 1863, one of the competitors Ivan Kramskoi organized a collective letter to the Academic Council, asking them to give the participants a free choice of subject if the theme set by the Council did not correspond to the artists' personal inclinations. The letter also questioned the advisability of isolating the participants for 24 hours to work on a sketch of the future painting. Their letter was rejected on 10 October.

After the rejection, the students sent a more detailed letter to the president of the Academy Prince Grigory Gagarin, which was left unanswered. In their third attempt, the competitors wrote to the chairman of the Council, Rector F. Bruni and went to the homes of at least four professors to ask each of them to change the rules. As a result, the Council decided not to implement broad themes and reverted to the usual practice of assigning the competitors specific topics.

== Revolt ==
The students were offended by the lack of response to their petitions and decided if their request was not satisfied, they would refuse to participate in the competition, and that each of them would apply for graduation from the Academy on the night before the competition. At 10 am on 9 November 1863, all fifteen participants of the competition were summoned to the Academy's conference hall, where Gagarin announced the theme of the upcoming competition would be "The Feast in Valhalla" with a focus on the posthumous bliss of the fallen heroes from the Nordic sagas. After the announcement, Ivan Kramskoi delivered a short speech declaring his refusal to participate in the competition, and criticising the Academy for not responding to their petitions. Following the speech, all but one of the fifteen students started to leave the conference hall. On their way out, each student left a prepared letter announcing he would not take part in the contest and asking to be granted a diploma as a ranked artist, to which each student was entitled regardless of his success in the contest.

The remaining participant was historical artist Pyotr Zabolotsky, who announced his intention to participate in the competition. The Academy Council told Zabolotsky the competition could not take place with just one person.

== Result ==
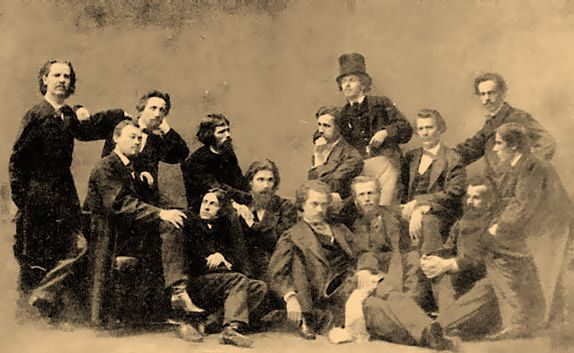
Group photo of Artel, 1863.

The thwarted competition was reported to Emperor Alexander II, who ordered police supervision of the former participants.

In late 1863, the artists went on to establish the Artel of Artists, where they could independently sell their own work. Despite its economic success, the group disbanded eight years later and some of its members joined a new group called the Society for Travelling Art Exhibitions (Peredvizhniki). Seven of the fourteen members of the revolt, including Ivan Kramskoi, later received the honorary title Academician while three received the title Professor of the Imperial Academy of Arts. One of the participants of the revolt Kirill Lemokh became a teacher of arts for the children of Emperor Alexander III. This is an indication the artists were not opposed in principle to the Academy of Arts, to which they belonged in many respects; they wanted to be free to independently show and sell their work. The Academy provided the Peredvizhniki with exhibition space for the next several years.

The event was the first demonstration by realist artists against the classical style that was popular in 19th-century Russia. Historians such as John Ellis Bowlt and Tamara Talbot Rice cite the revolt as the source of realism in Russian art.
