= Nikolay Shustov =

Russian painter (1834–1868)

- Николай Семёнович Шустов
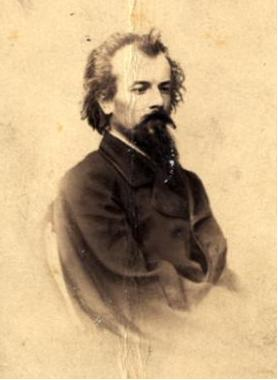
- Photograph (before 1868)
- Born: December 29, 1834; St. Petersburg
- Died: December 5, 1868 (aged 33); St. Petersburg
- Education: Imperial Academy of Arts (1863)
- Known for: Painting
- Style: Academism
- Elected: Member Academy of Arts (1865)

Nikolay Semyonovich Shustov (Russian: Николай Семёнович Шустов; 29 December 1834 — 5 December 1868) was a Russian painter, active in St. Petersburg during Tsar Alexander II's reign, most known for his part in the Revolt of the Fourteen.

== Biography ==
His father was a merchant. He received his initial training at the Imperial Academy of Arts. In 1856, he was awarded a silver medal for "painting from nature" and the following year was awarded another for "sketching from life". This was followed by a gold medal in 1858, and another in 1861 for his rather lengthily titled painting "Иоанн III свергает татарское иго, разорвав изображение хана и приказав умертвить послов" (Ivan III overthrowing the Mongol yoke, destroying the Khan's image and killing his ambassadors).

Two years later, he joined the "Revolt of the Fourteen", a group of students who supported the newer Realistic art and were protesting the Academy's insistence on promoting the Classical style. He and the others tendered their resignations and were graduated as "Artists Second-Class". He later joined Ivan Kramskoi and other members of the revolt in a new group called the Artel of Artists.

In 1865, at an exhibition by the Artel, his portrait of Mikhail Korsakov (Governor-General of Eastern Siberia) drew attention and he was elevated to the title of "Academician" at the Academy. He died, aged only thirty-three, after suffering from a sudden mental derangement, implied by Ilya Repin to be a consequence from excessive drinking.

== Selected works ==
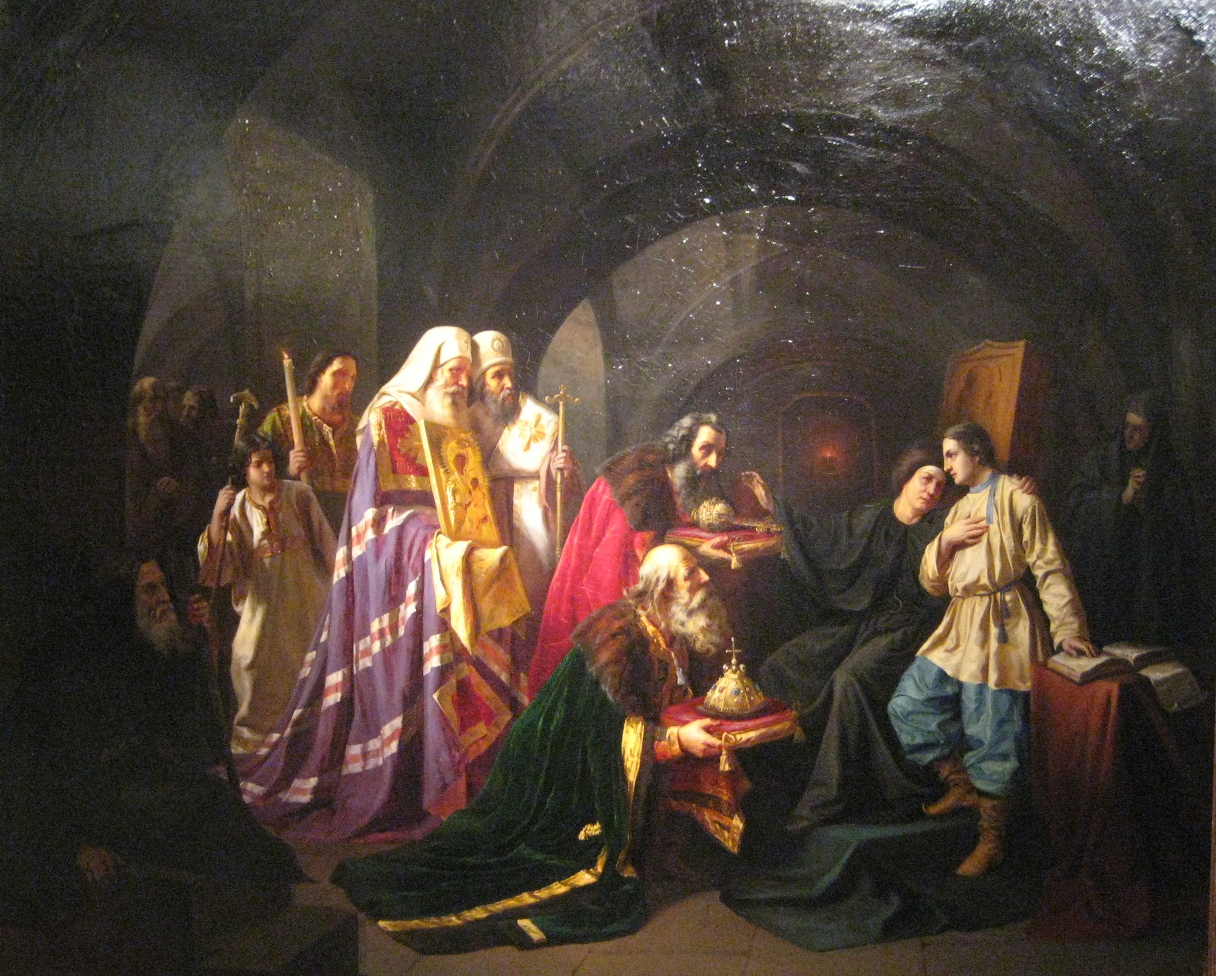
Michael's calling to rule (1859)

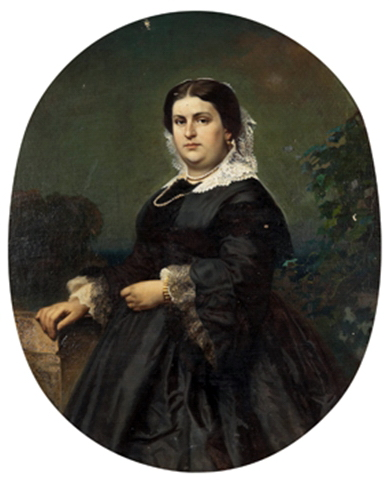
Portrait of Karin Palander Poppius (1867)

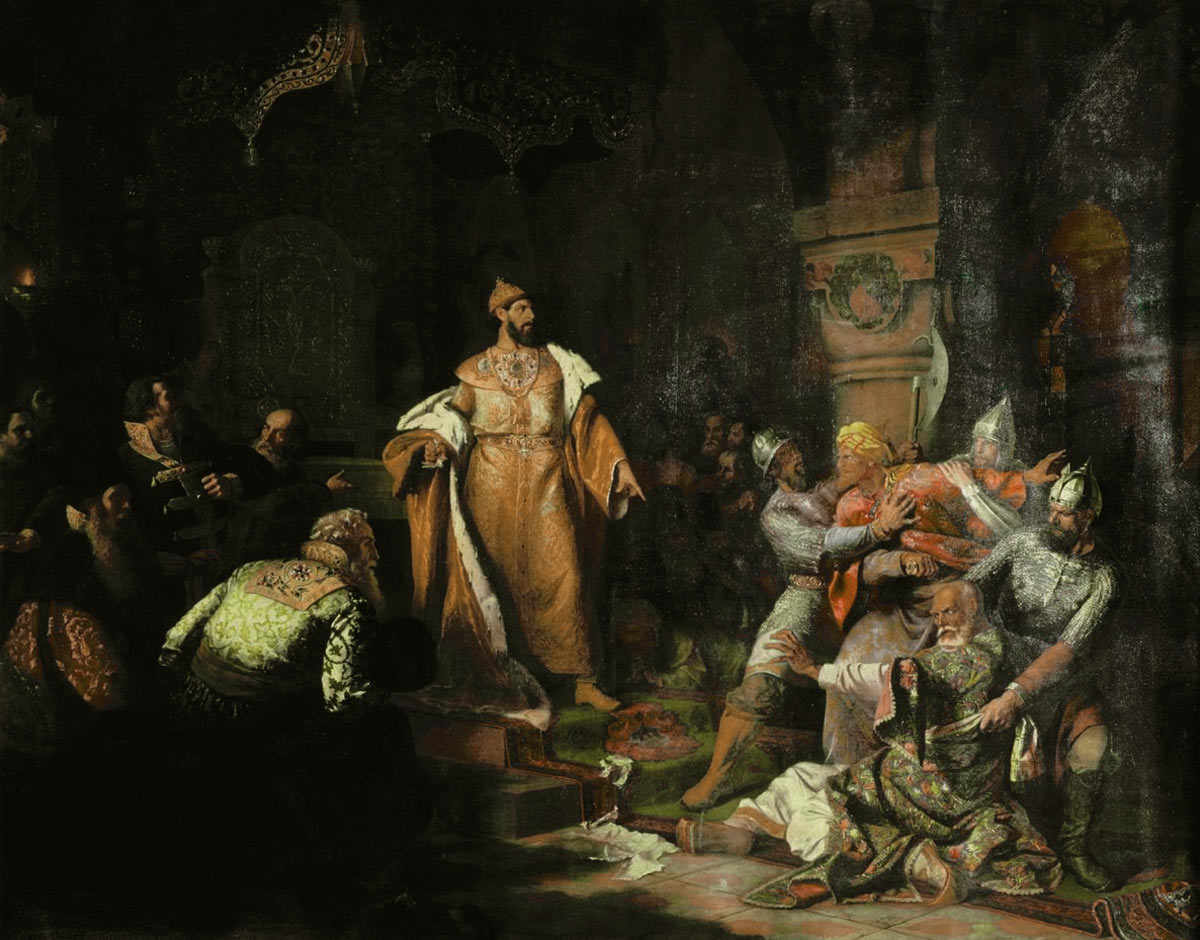
Ivan III overthrows the Mongol-Tatar yoke, breaking the image of the Khan and ordering the killing of the ambassadors (1862)

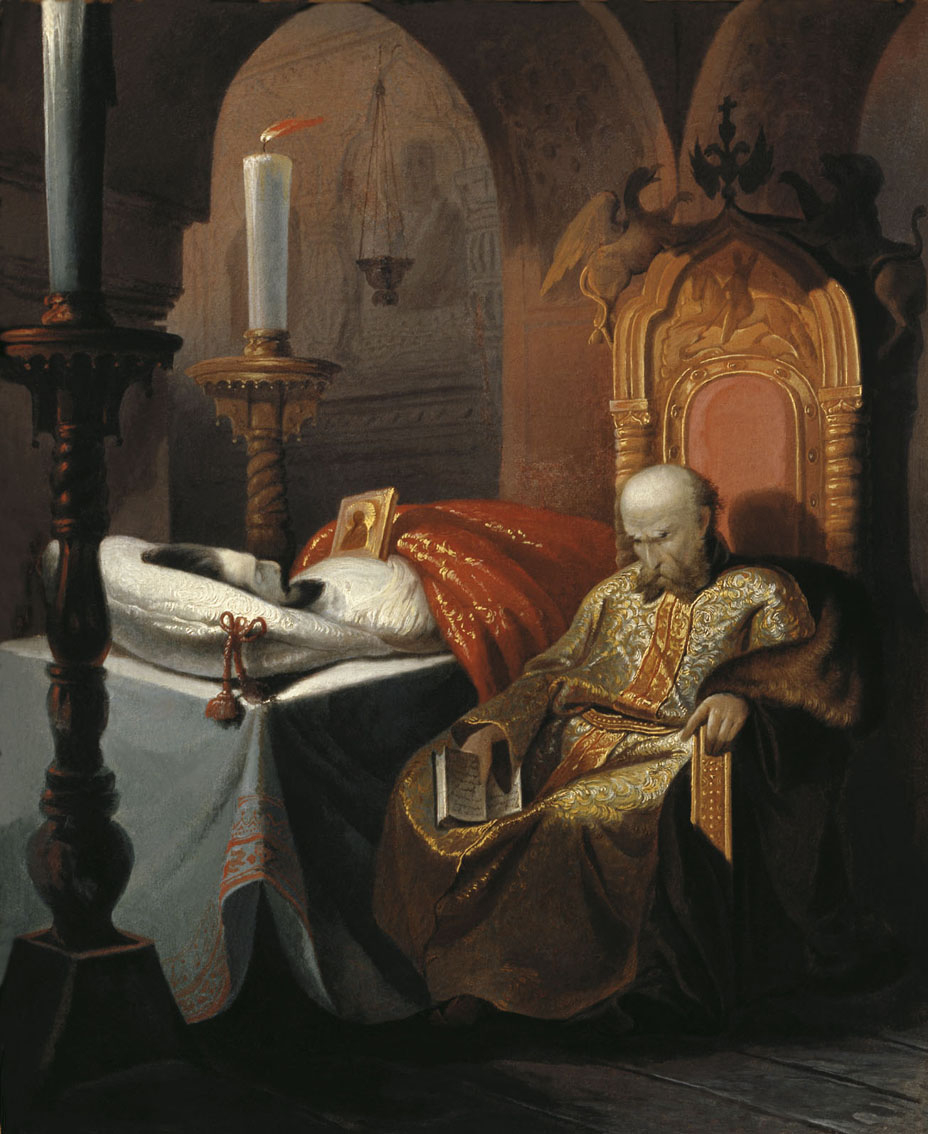
Ivan the Terrible with the Body of his Son, Who he has Murdered (1860s)
