= Alexander Litovchenko =

Russian painter

- Александр Литовченко
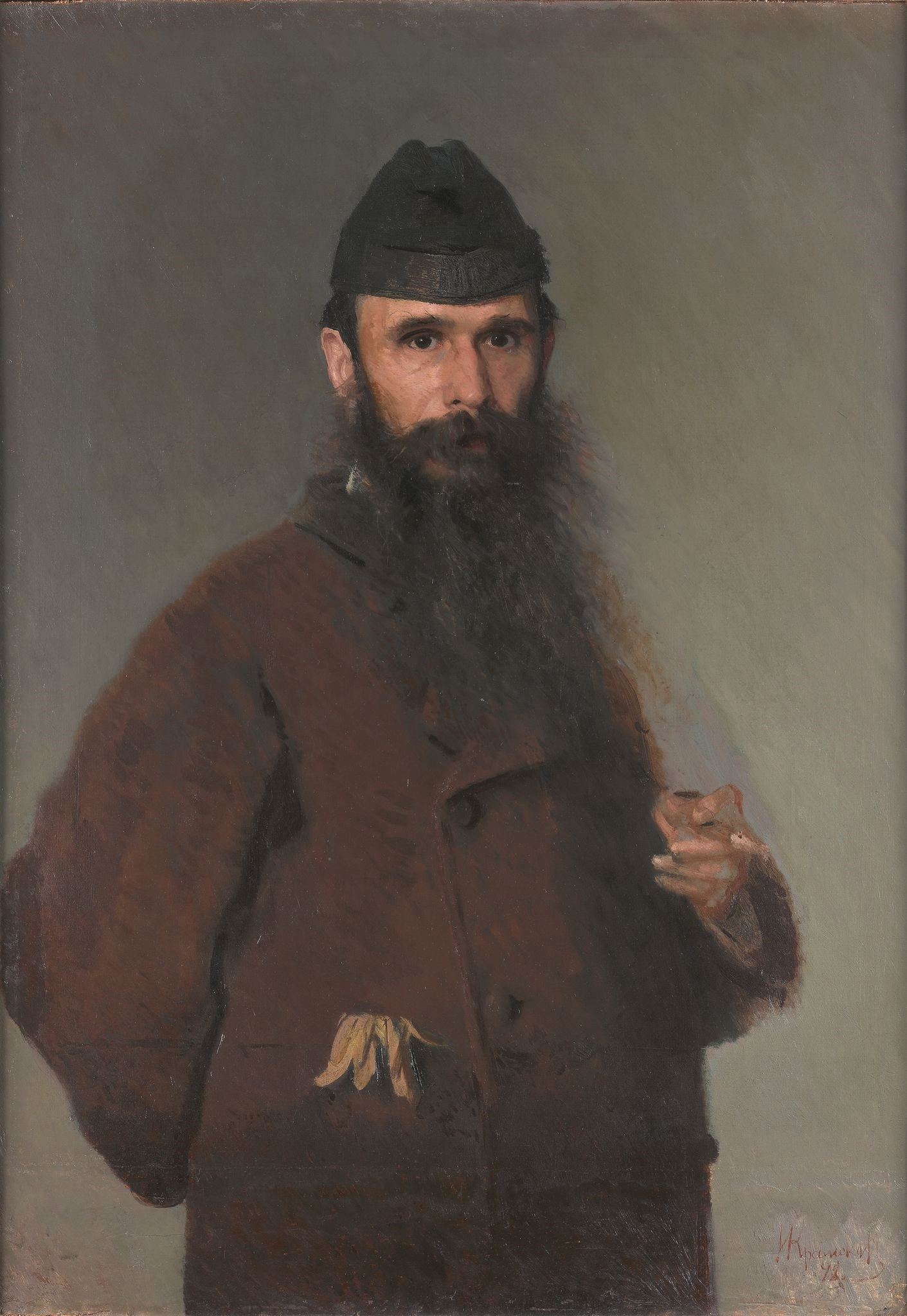
- Portrait by Ivan Kramskoi (1878)
- Born: March 14, 1835; Kremenchuk, Russian Empire
- Died: June 16, 1890 (aged 55); Saint Petersburg, Russian Empire
- Resting place: Novodevichy Cemetery, Saint Petersburg
- Education: Member Academy of Arts (1868)
- Alma mater: Imperial Academy of Arts (1863)
- Known for: Painting
- Style: Realism, Classicism
- Movement: Peredvizhniki

Alexander Dmitrievich Litovchenko (Russian: Александр Дмитриевич Литовченко; Ukrainian: Олександр Дмитрович Литовченко; 26 March [O.S. 14 March] 1835 – 28 June [O.S. 16 June] 1890) was a Russian painter. He specialized in depicting Muscovite Russia of the 16th and 17th centuries.

== Biography ==
Litovchenko attended the Imperial Academy of Arts and, although criticised by his peers for rather stilted compositions, was awarded a lesser gold medal for his rendering of Charon transporting the souls of the dead across the Styx. Along with several other young painters, he challenged the spirit of academism that was prevalent at the Academy and in 1863 left it to become a freelance painter, joining the Peredvizhniki movement in 1876.

In 1868, Litovchenko was recognized as an academician for his picture of a falconer serving at the court of Tsar Alexis (one of his several versions of the subject). Among his larger paintings, Ivan the Terrible Showing His Treasures to Jerome Horsey (1875) was purchased by the Tsar for the Alexander III Museum in St. Petersburg, and Tsar Alexis and Archbishop Nikon Venerating the Relics of Patriarch Philip (1886) was acquired by Pavel Tretyakov for his collection in Moscow (as were the finest of his portraits).

Litovchenko is also remembered as the author of seven murals in the Cathedral of Christ the Saviour in Moscow and a set of icons for the Crimean War memorial in Sevastopol.

Alexander Litovchenko's works

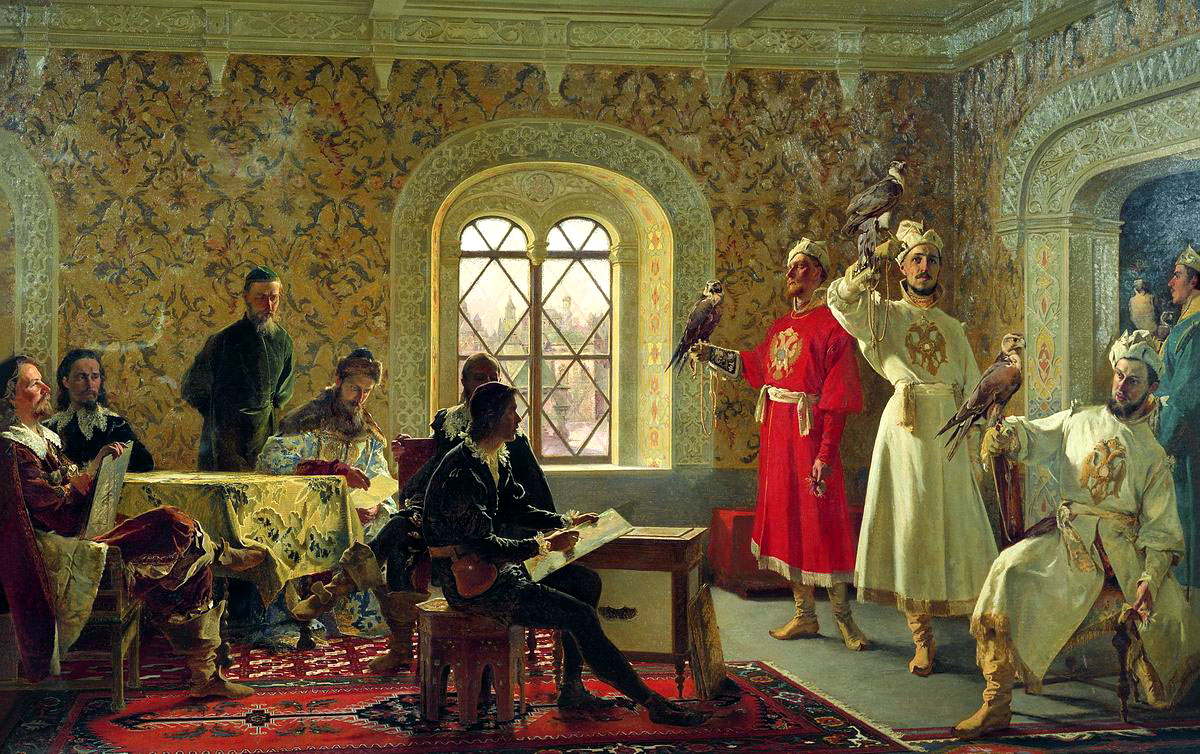
Ambassador Horatio Calvucci sketching the favorite falcons of Tsar Alexis I (1889)

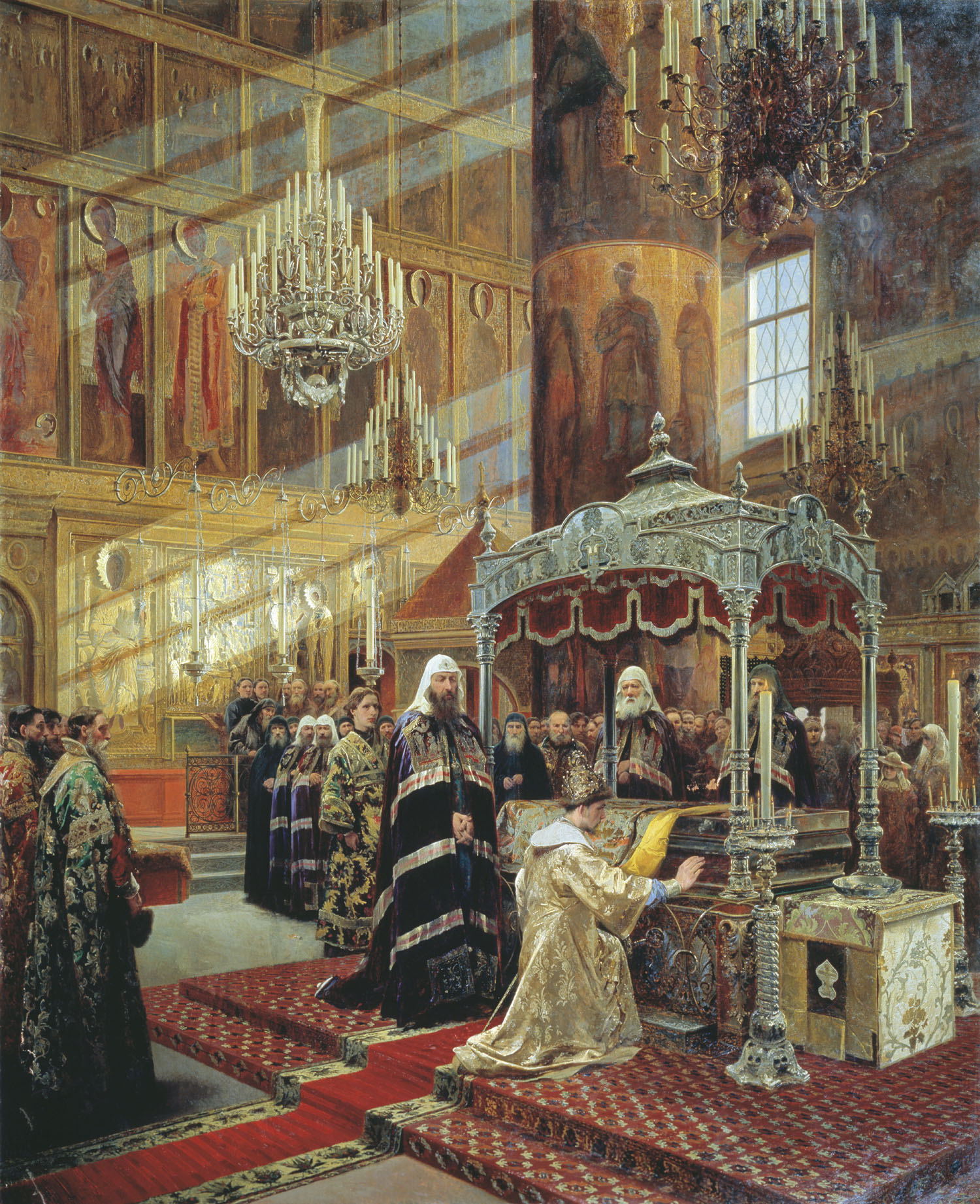
Tsar Alexis praying before the relics in the presence of Metropolitan Philip and Patriarch Nikon

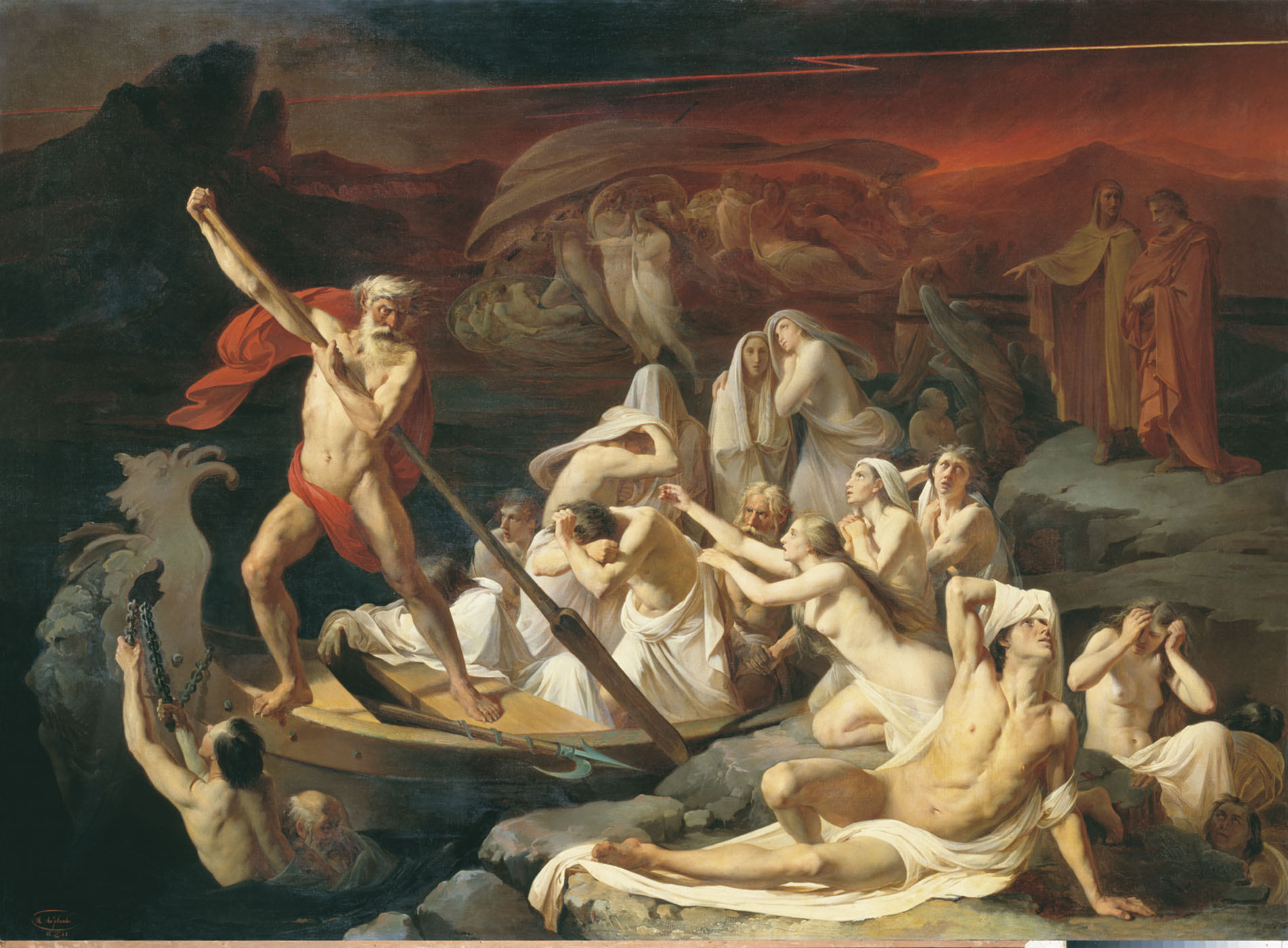
Charon Carrying Souls Across the River Styx (1861)

Ivan the Terrible showing his treasures to Jerome Horsey, the English Ambassador (1875)

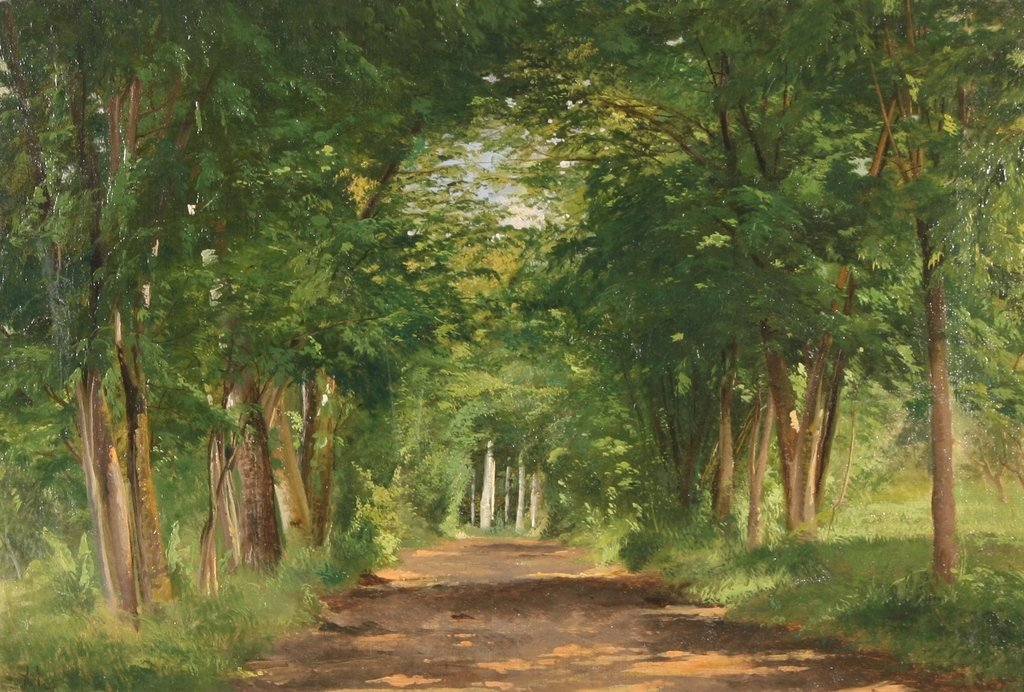
A sunny path in the forest (1874; private collection)

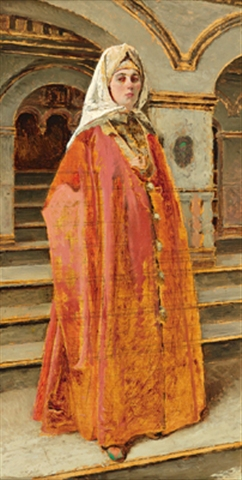
Boyarynya (1870-1880; private collection)

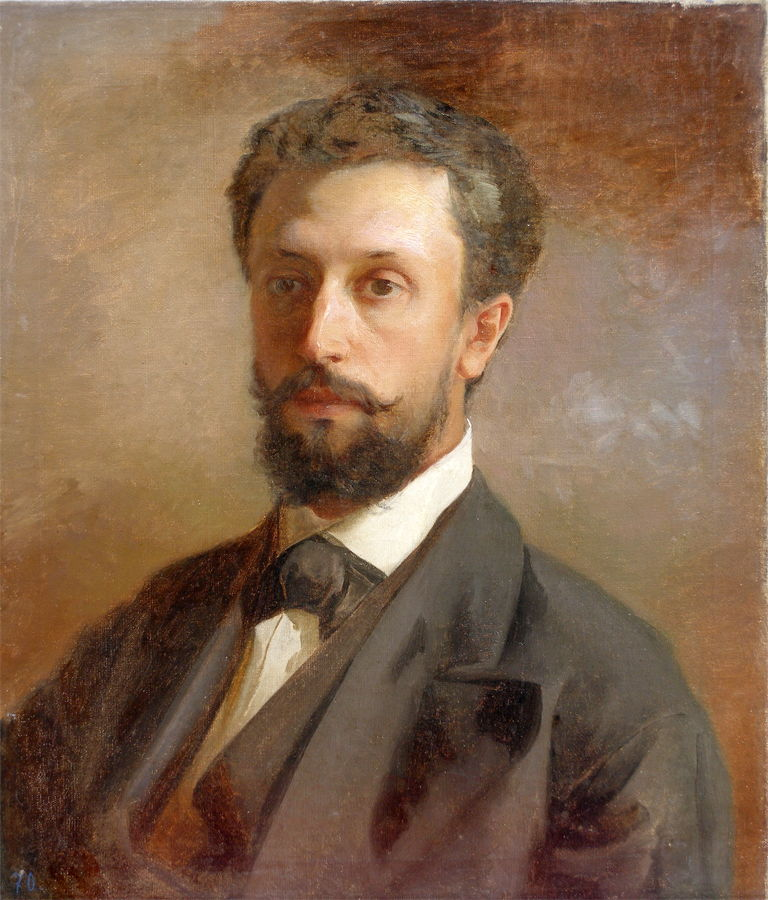
Portrait of Evgeny Grigoryevich Schwartz (1874)

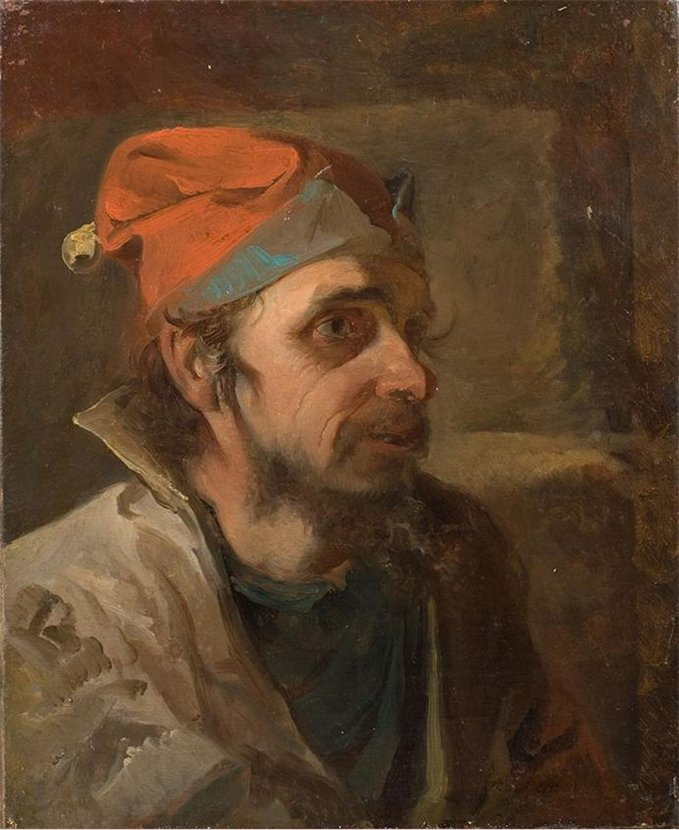
The Fool (1875)
