= Peredvizhniki =

1870s–1890s group of Russian realist artists

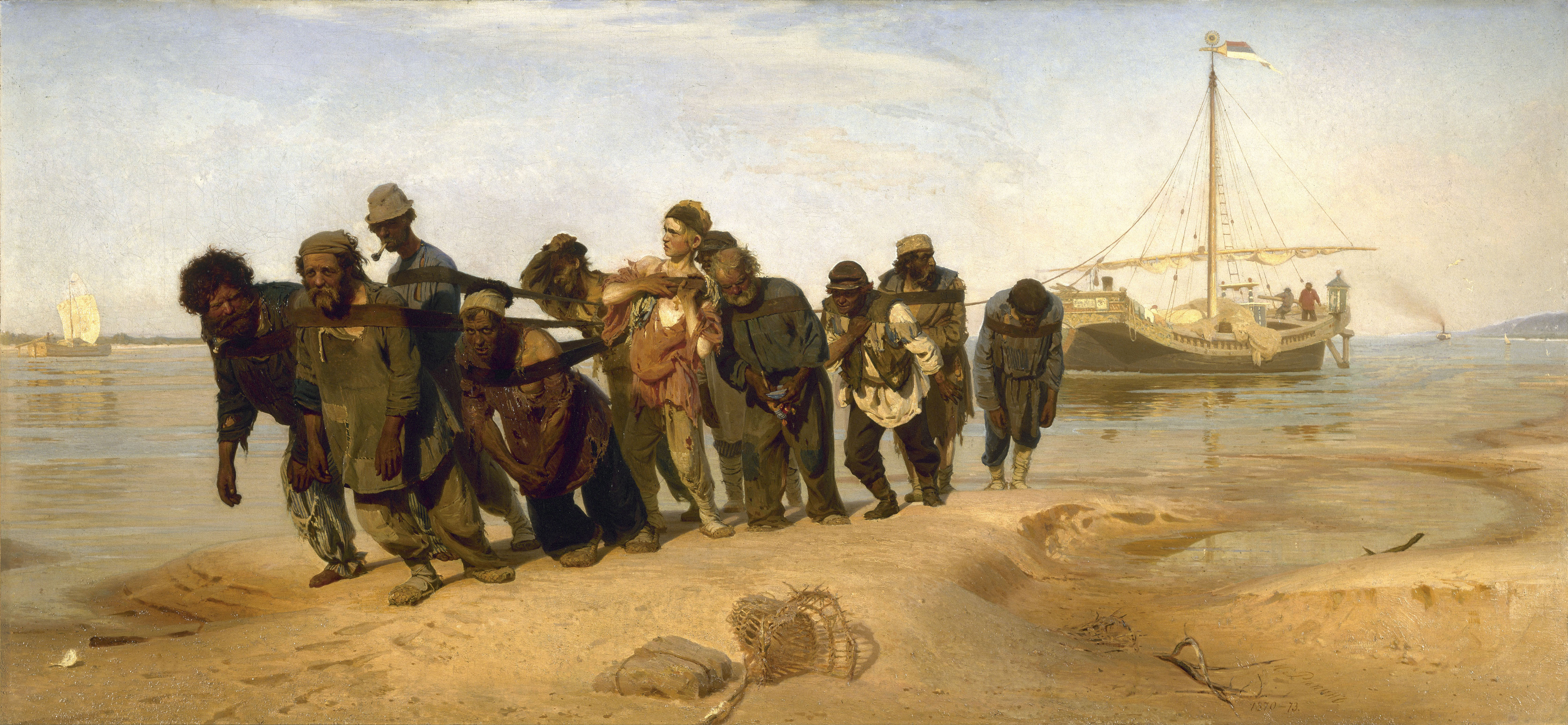
Ilya Repin, Barge Haulers on the Volga, 1870–1873

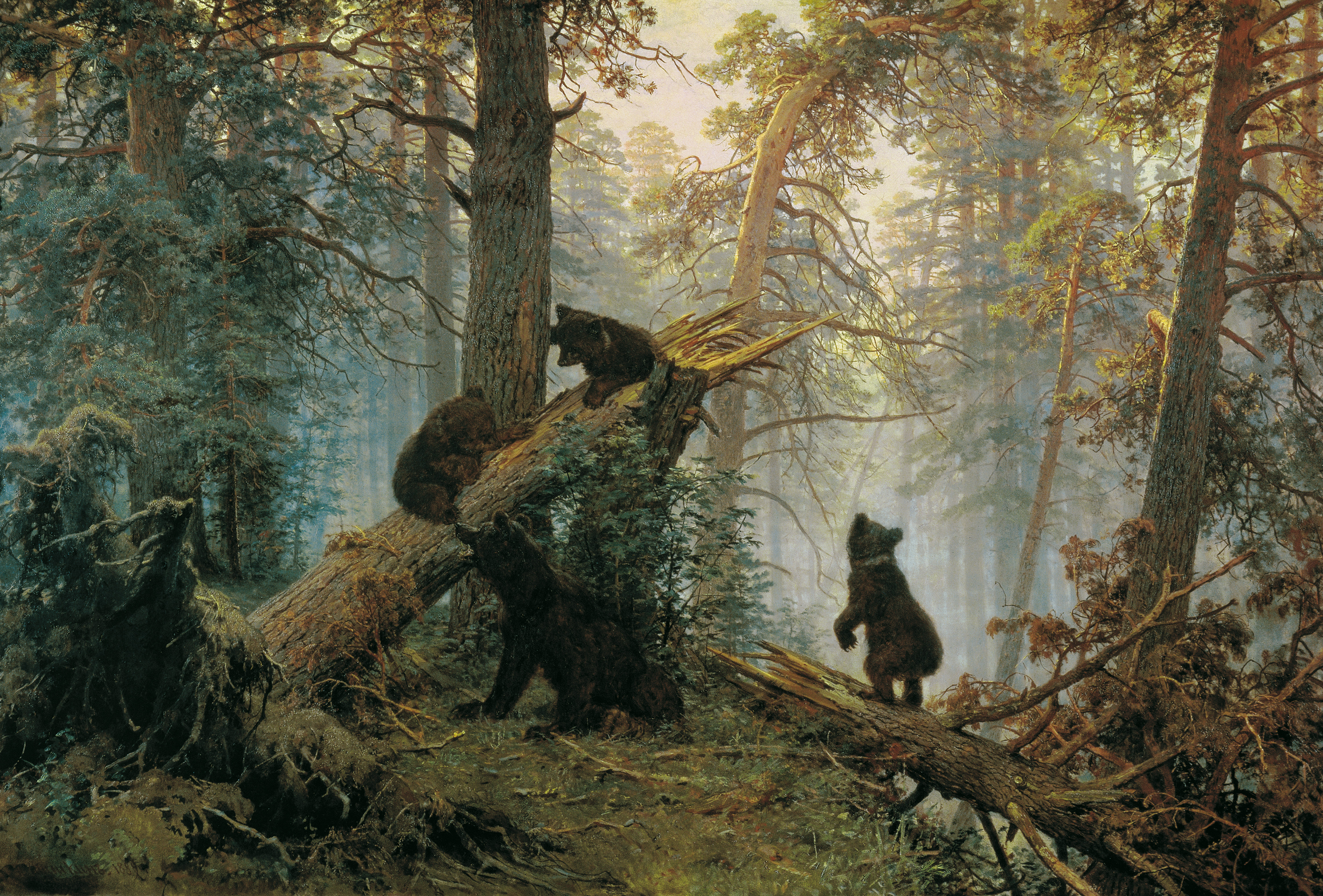
Ivan Shishkin and Konstantin Savitsky, Morning in a Pine Forest, 1878

Peredvizhniki (Russian: передви́жники, IPA: [pʲɪrʲɪˈdvʲiʐnʲɪkʲɪ]), often called The Wanderers or The Itinerants in English, were a group of Russian realist artists who formed an artists' cooperative in protest of academic restrictions; it evolved into the Society for Travelling Art Exhibitions, in short Peredvizhniks, in 1870.

== History ==
In 1863, a group of fourteen students decided to leave the Imperial Academy of Arts in Saint Petersburg. The students found the rules of the Academy constraining; the teachers were conservative and there was a strict separation between high and low art. In an effort to bring art to the people, the students formed an independent artistic society; The Petersburg Cooperative of Artists (Artel). In 1870, this organization was largely succeeded by the Association of Travelling Art Exhibits (Peredvizhniki) to give people from the provinces a chance to follow the achievements of Russian Art, and to teach people to appreciate art. The society maintained independence from state support and brought the art, which illustrated the contemporary life of the people from Moscow and Saint Petersburg, to the provinces.

From 1871 to 1923, the society arranged 48 mobile exhibitions in St. Petersburg and Moscow, after which they were shown in Kiev, Kharkov, Kazan, Oryol, Riga, Odessa and other cities.

== Influence of literary critics ==
Peredvizhniki were influenced by the public views of the literary critics Vissarion Belinsky and Nikolai Chernyshevsky, both of whom espoused liberal ideas. Belinsky thought that literature and art should attribute a social and moral responsibility. Like most Slavophiles, Chernyshevsky ardently supported the emancipation of serfs, which was finally realized in the reform of 1861. He viewed press censorship, serfdom, and capital punishment as Western influences. Because of his political activism, officials prohibited publication of any of his writing, including his dissertation; but it eventually found its way to the art world of nineteenth-century Russia. In 1863, almost immediately after the emancipation of serfs, Chernyshevsky's goals were realized with the help of Peredvizhniki, who took the pervasive Slavophile-populist idea that Russia had a distinguishable, modest, inner beauty of its own and worked out how to display it on canvas.

== Subjects of the paintings ==
External videos
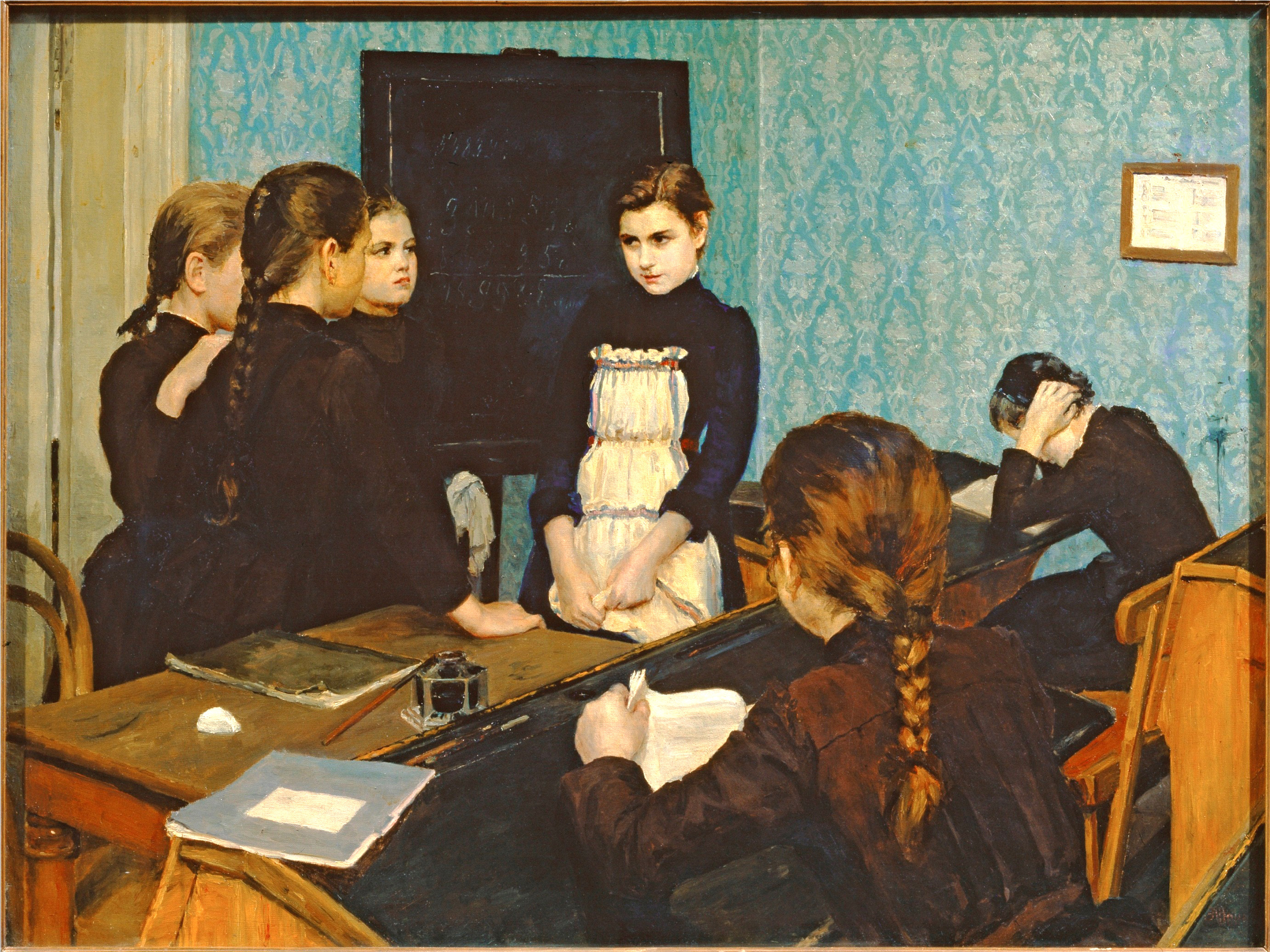
- Newcomer at School by Emily Shanks
- An introduction to Peredvizhniki, 12:20, in Swedish with English subtitles.
- Interview with guest curator David Jackson, 3:30, in English with Swedish subtitles.
- Interview with Galina Tjurak, 2:30, in Russian with English subtitles. Nationalmuseum (Stockholm), 2011

Peredvizhniki portrayed the many-sided aspects of social life, often critical of inequities and injustices. But their art showed not only poverty but also the beauty of the folk way of life; not only suffering but also fortitude and strength of characters. Peredvizhniki condemned the Russian aristocratic orders and autocratic government in their humanistic art. They portrayed the emancipation movement of Russian people with empathy (for example, The Arrest of a Propagandist, Refusal of Confession, and They Did Not Expect Him by Ilya Yefimovich Repin). They portrayed social-urban life, and later used historic art to depict the common people (The Morning of the Streltsy Execution by Vasily Surikov).

During their blossoming (1870–1890), the Peredvizhniki society developed an increasingly wider scope, with more natural and free images. In contrast to the traditional dark palette of the time, they chose a lighter palette, with a freer manner in their technique. They worked for naturalness in their images, and the depiction of people's relationship with their surroundings. The society united most of the highly talented artists of the country. Among Peredvizhniki there were artists of Ukraine, Latvia, and Armenia. The society also showed the work of Mark Antokolski, Vasili Vereshchagin, and Andrei Ryabushkin. The work of the critic and democrat Vladimir Stasov was important for the development of Peredvizhniki's art. Pavel Mikhailovich Tretyakov showed the work of these artists in his gallery and gave them important material and moral support.

== Landscape as the most popular genre of Peredvizhniki ==
Landscape painting flourished in the 1870s and 1880s. Peredvizhniki painted mainly landscapes; some, like Polenov, used plein air technique. Two painters, Ivan Shishkin and Isaak Levitan, painted only landscapes of Russia. Shishkin is still considered to be the Russian "Singer of forest", while Levitan's landscapes are famous for their intense moods. The Russian landscape gained importance as a national icon after Peredvizhniki.

Peredvizhniki painted landscapes to explore the beauty of their own country and encourage ordinary people to love and preserve it. Levitan once said, "I imagine such a gracefulness in our Russian land – overflowing rivers bringing everything back to life. There is no country more beautiful than Russia! There can be a true landscapist only in Russia". Peredvizhniki gave a national character to landscapes, so people of other nations could recognize Russian landscape. The landscapes of Peredvizhniki are the symbolic embodiments of Russian nationality.

== Reproduction of works ==
Even though the number of travelling exhibition visitors from the provinces was increasing during the years, the main audience was the urban elite. Local photographers created the first reproductions of Peredvizhniki's paintings, which helped popularize the works and could be bought at exhibitions. Niva magazine also published illustrated articles about the exhibitions. Since 1898, the landscapes of the society have been used in the postcard industry. Various books of poems were published with the illustrations of landscapes. Ordinary Russian people at that time could not afford to go to Moscow or Saint Petersburg, so popularization of Russian art made them familiar with a number of Russian art masterpieces. Even now publishers use the reproductions in textbooks as a visual icon of national identity.

== Decline of creativity ==
As the authority and public influence of the society steadily grew, government officials had to stop their efforts to repress the members. Attempts were made to subordinate their activity, and raise the falling value of Academy of Arts-sanctioned works. By the 1890s, the Academy of Arts structure was including Peredvizhniki art in its classes and history, and the influence of the artists showed in national art schools.

== Gallery ==
Social realism

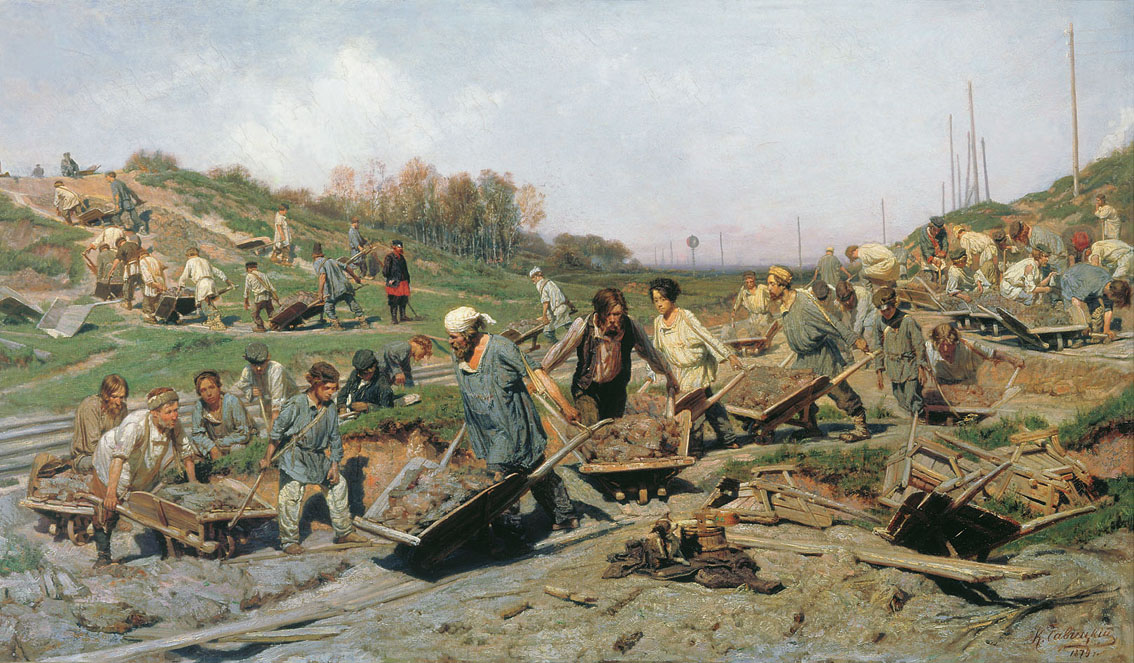
Konstantin Savitsky, Repairing the Railroad, 1874

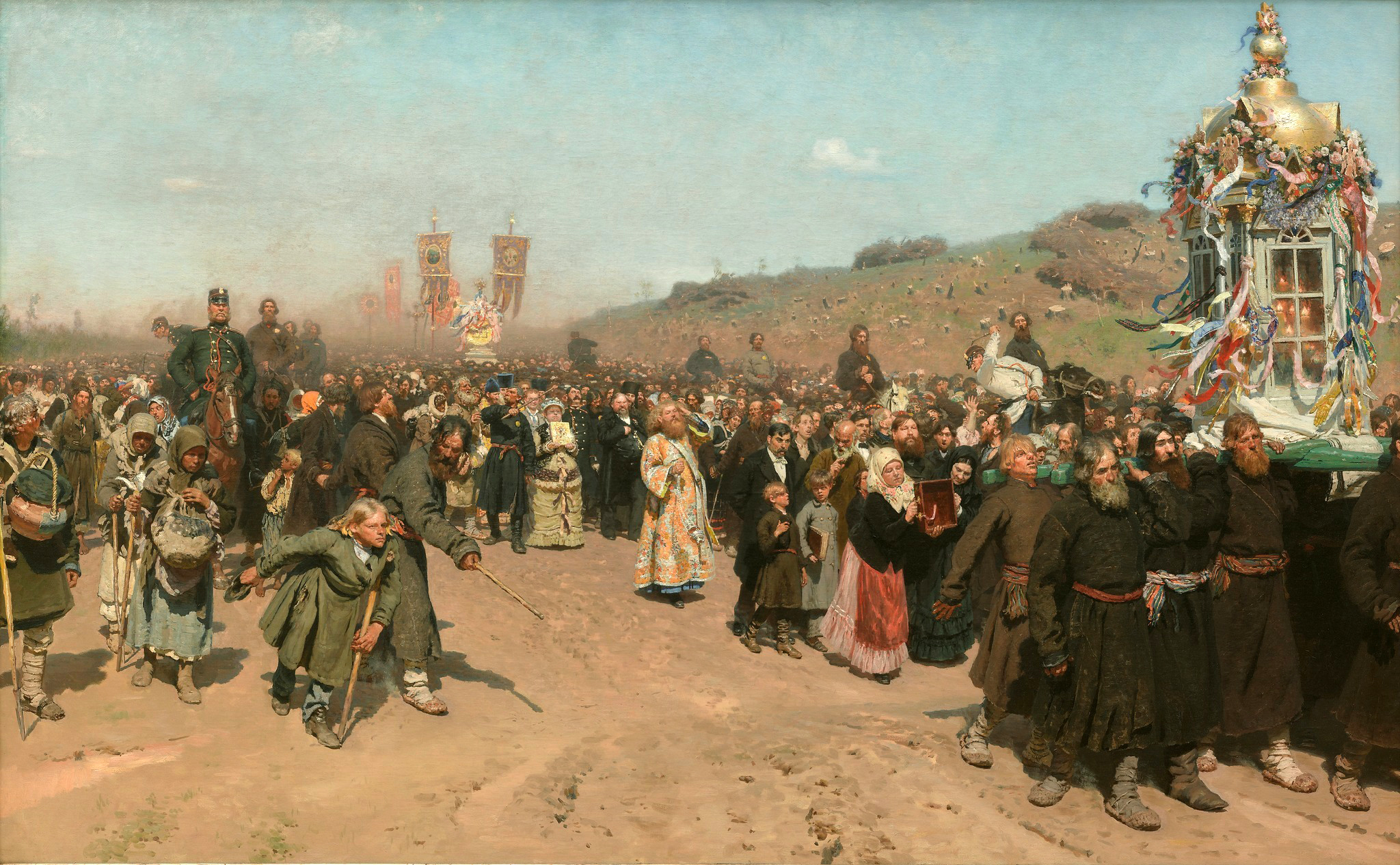
Ilya Repin, Religious Procession in Kursk Province, 1880–1883

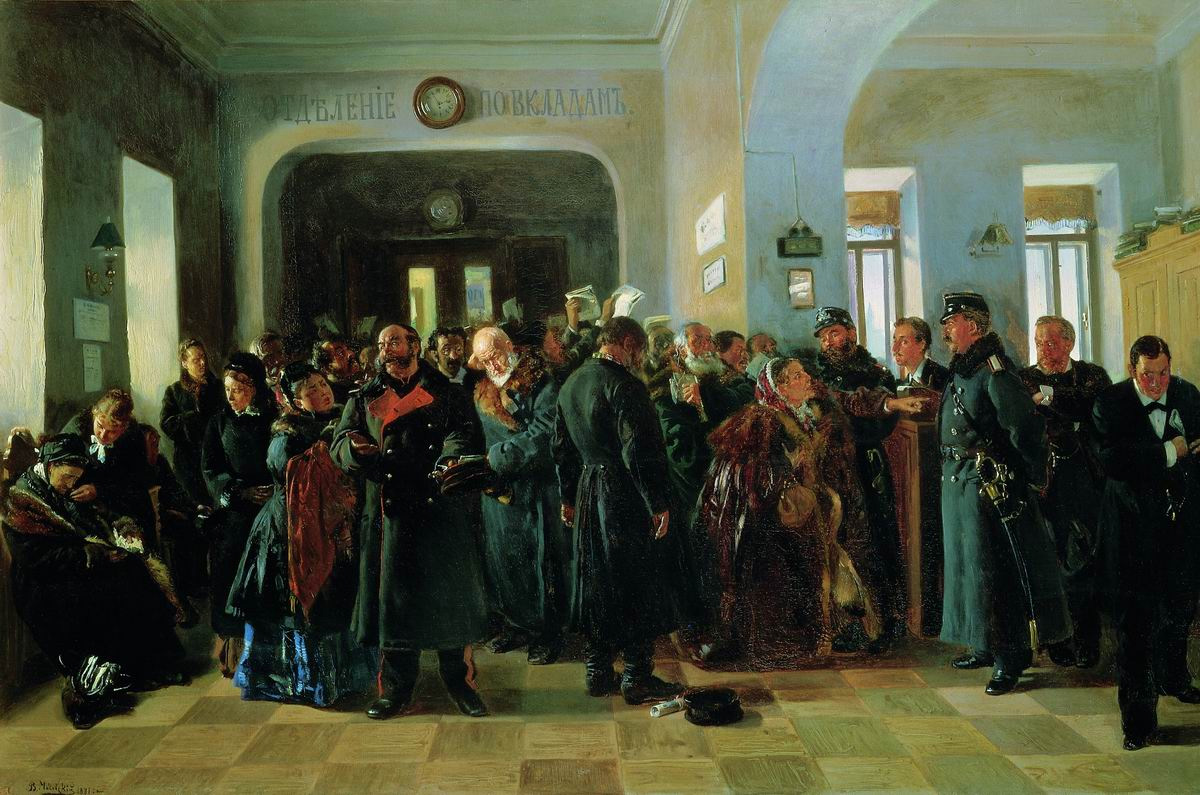
Vladimir Makovsky, Bankruptcy, 1881

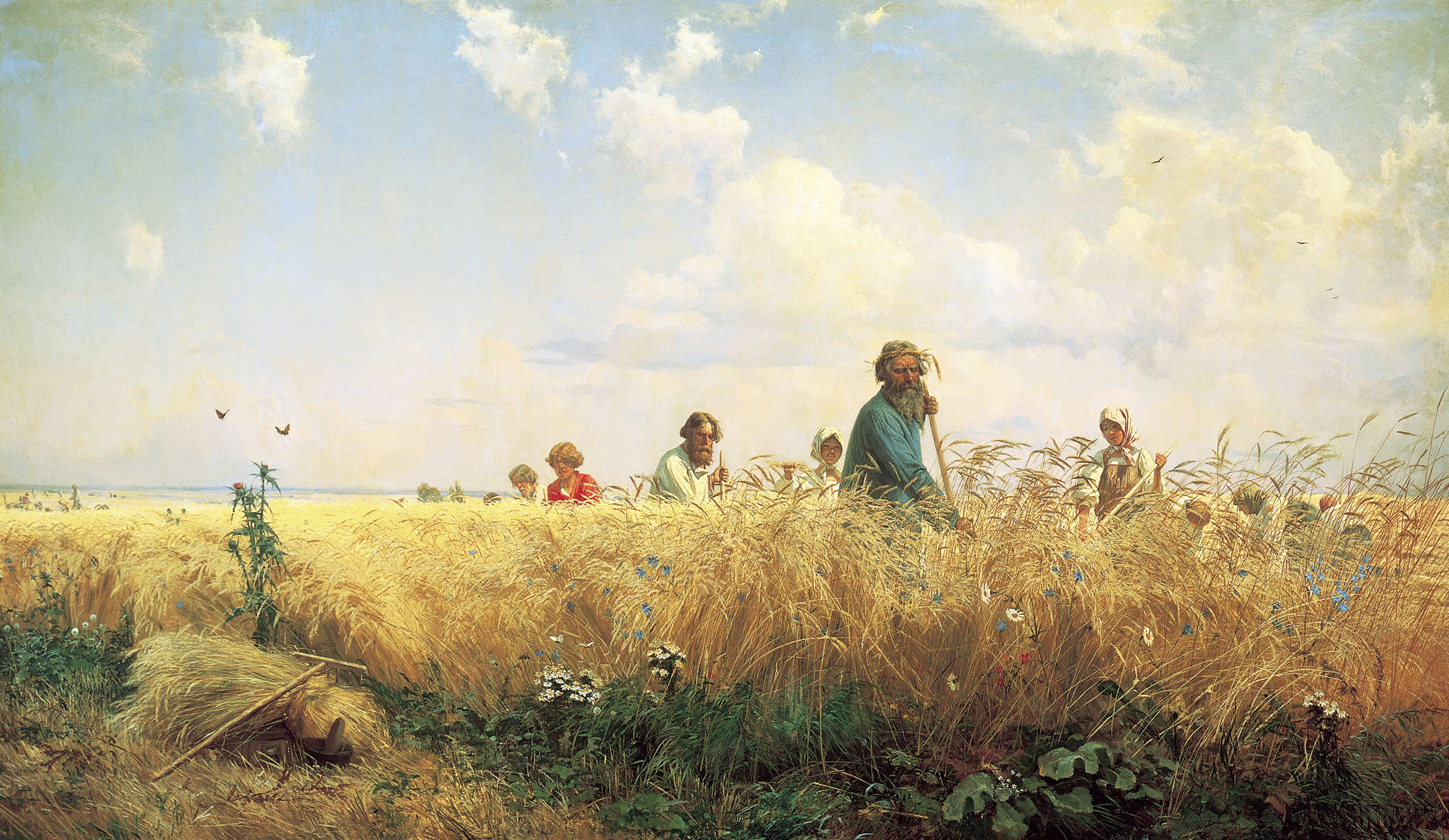
Grigoriy Myasoyedov, Busy Time for the Mowers 1887
Landscapes

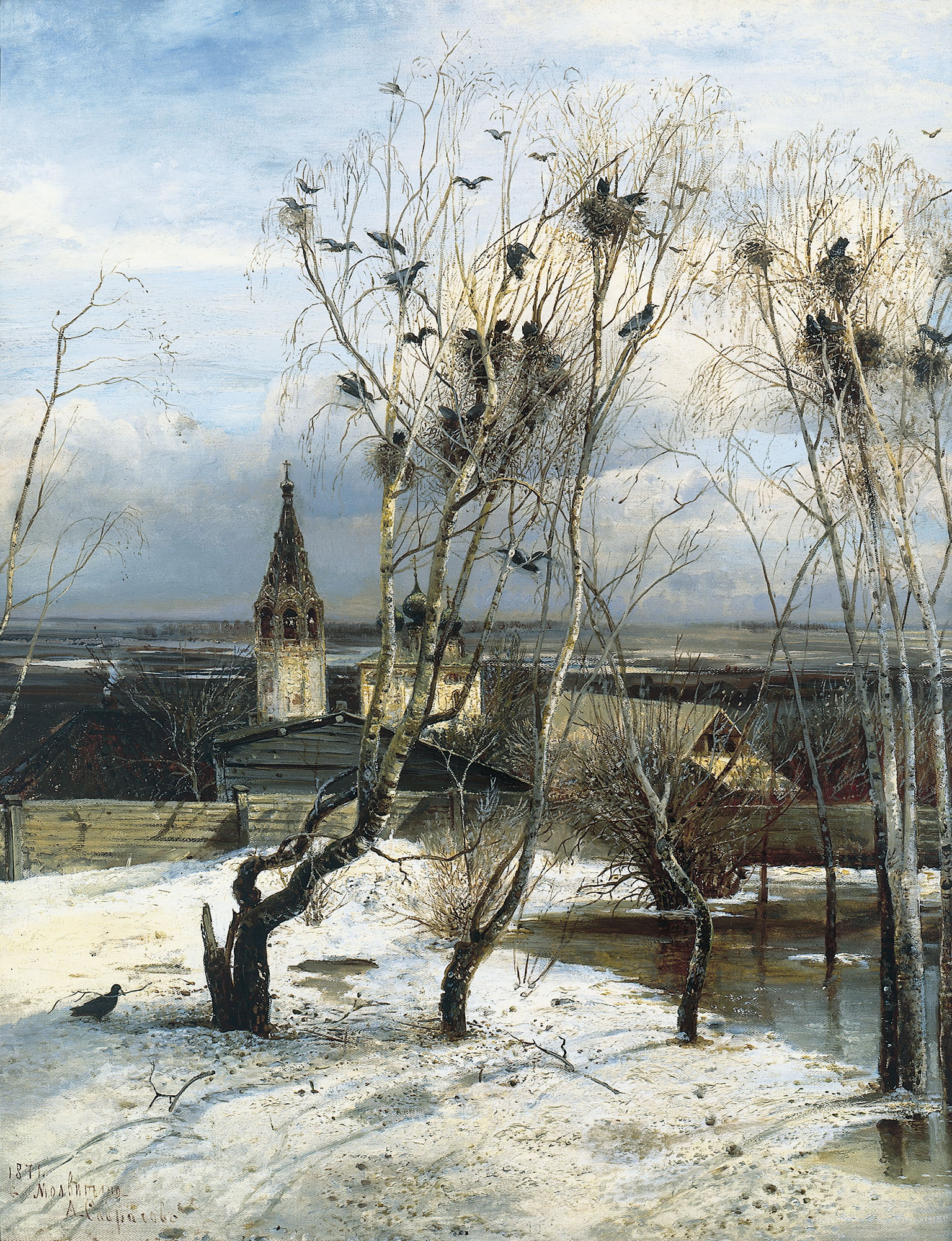
Alexei Savrasov, The Rooks Have Returned, 1871

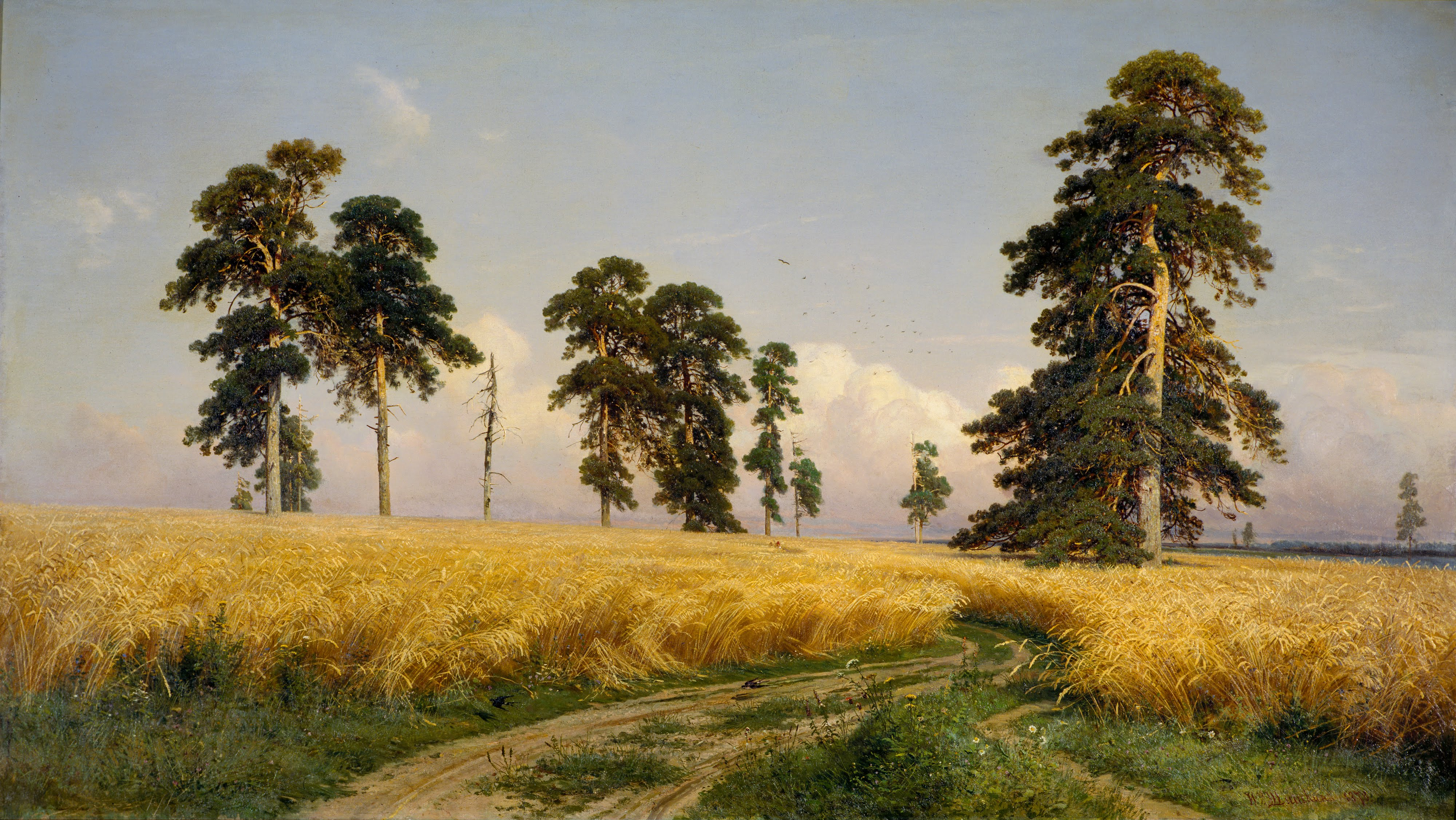
Ivan Shishkin, A Rye Field, 1878

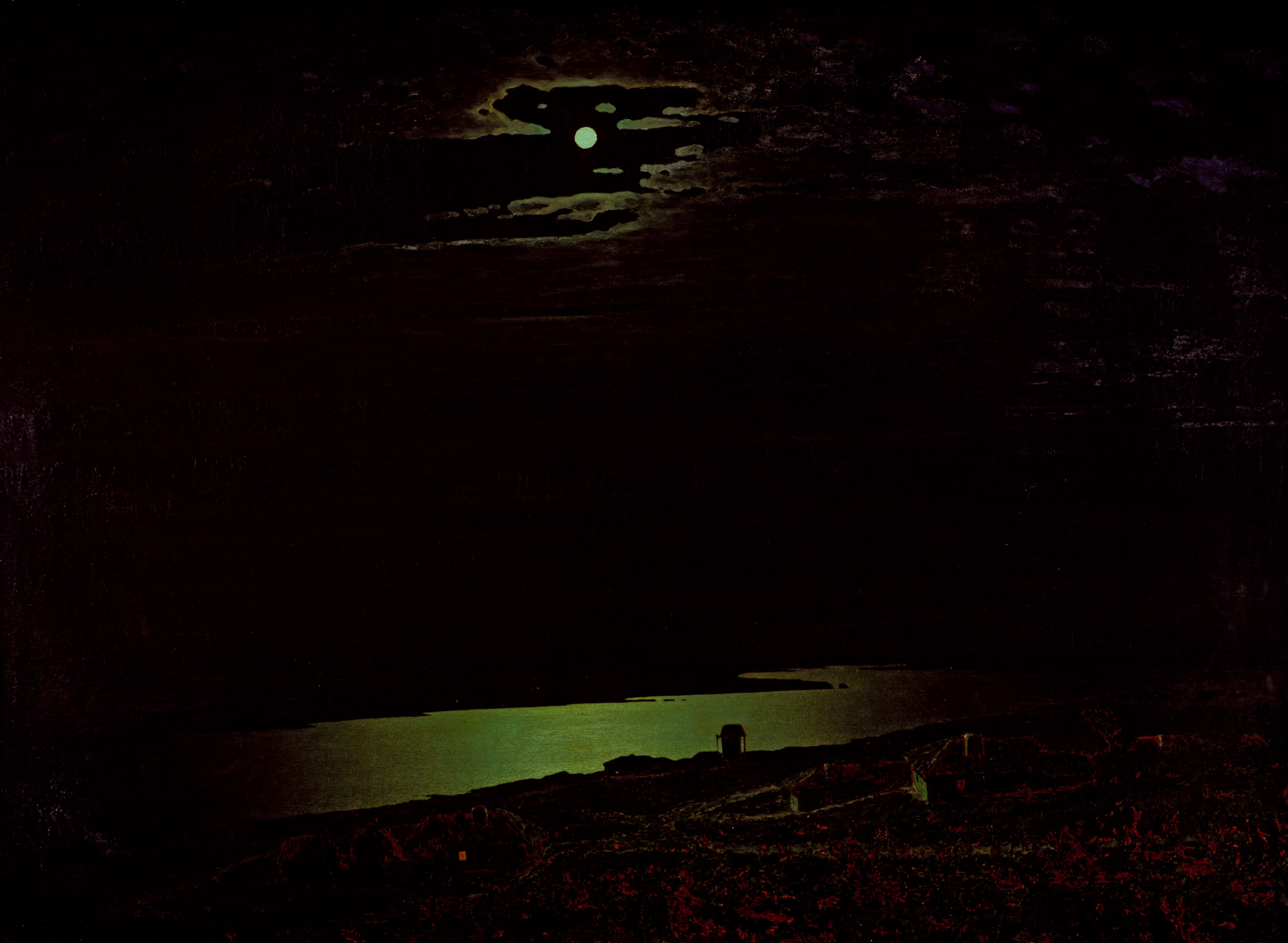
Arkhip Kuindzhi, Moonlit Night on the Dnieper, 1882

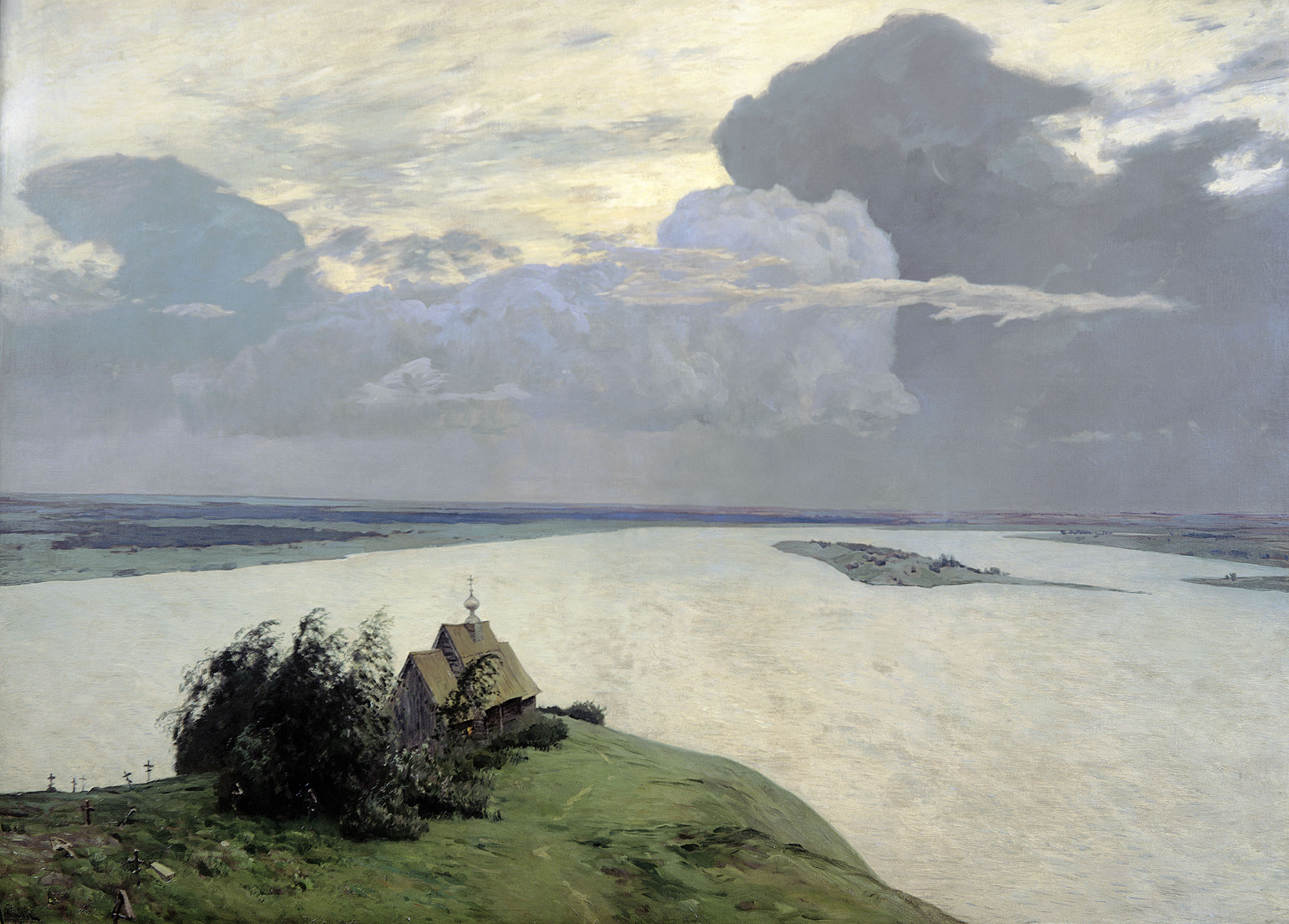
Isaac Levitan, Over Eternal Peace, 1894
Portraits

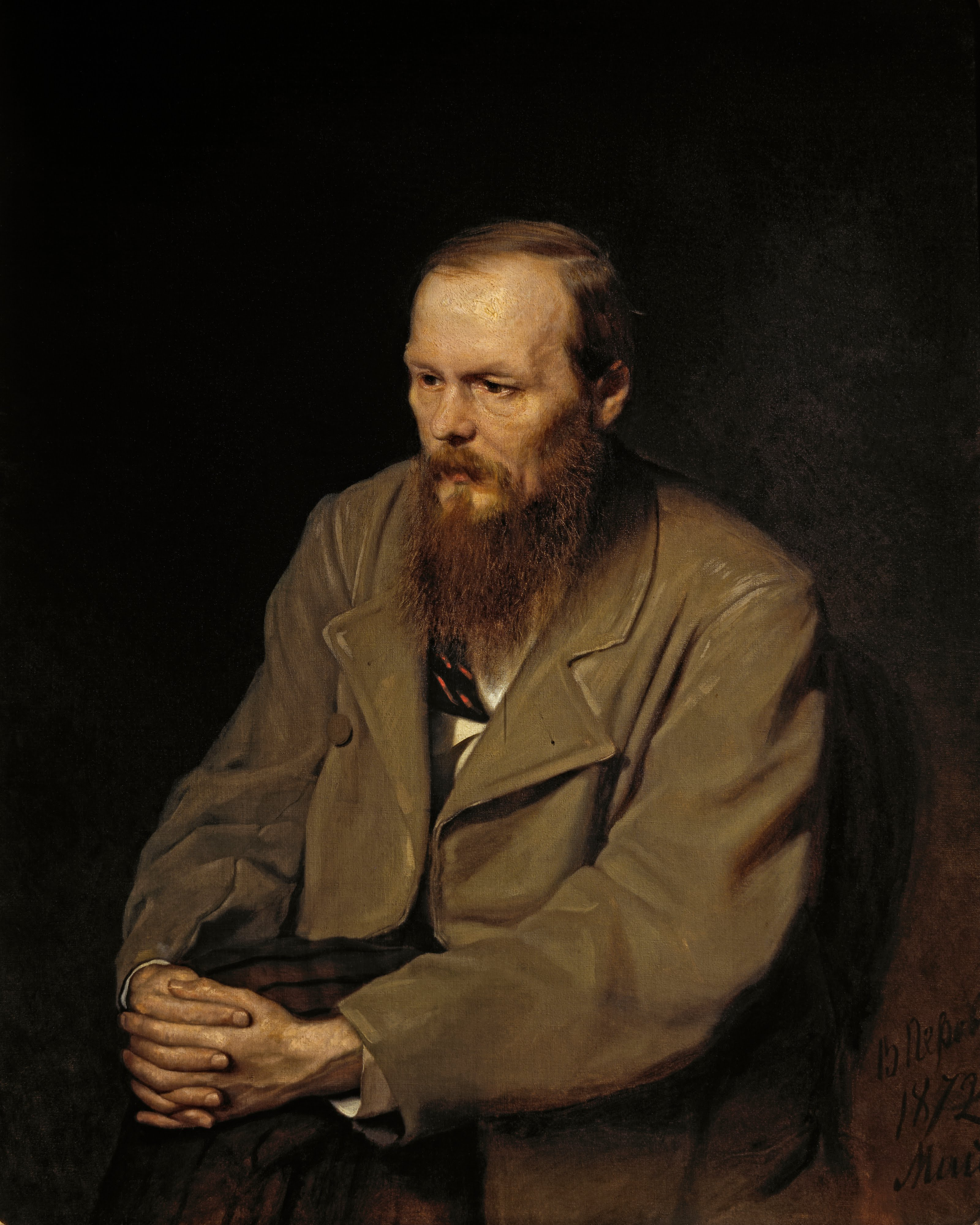
Vasily Perov, Portrait of Fyodor Dostoevsky, 1872

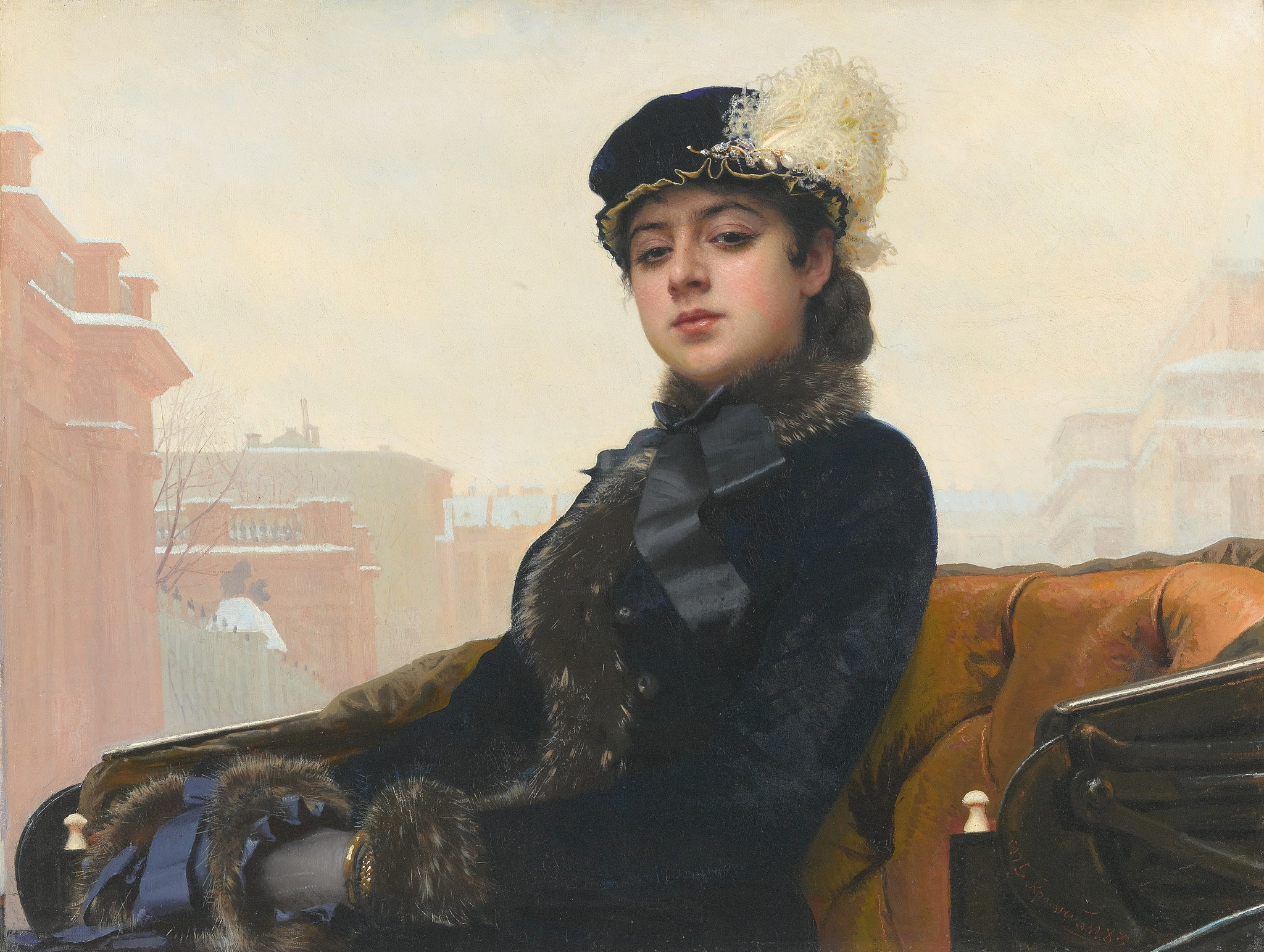
Ivan Kramskoi, Portrait of an Unknown Woman, 1883

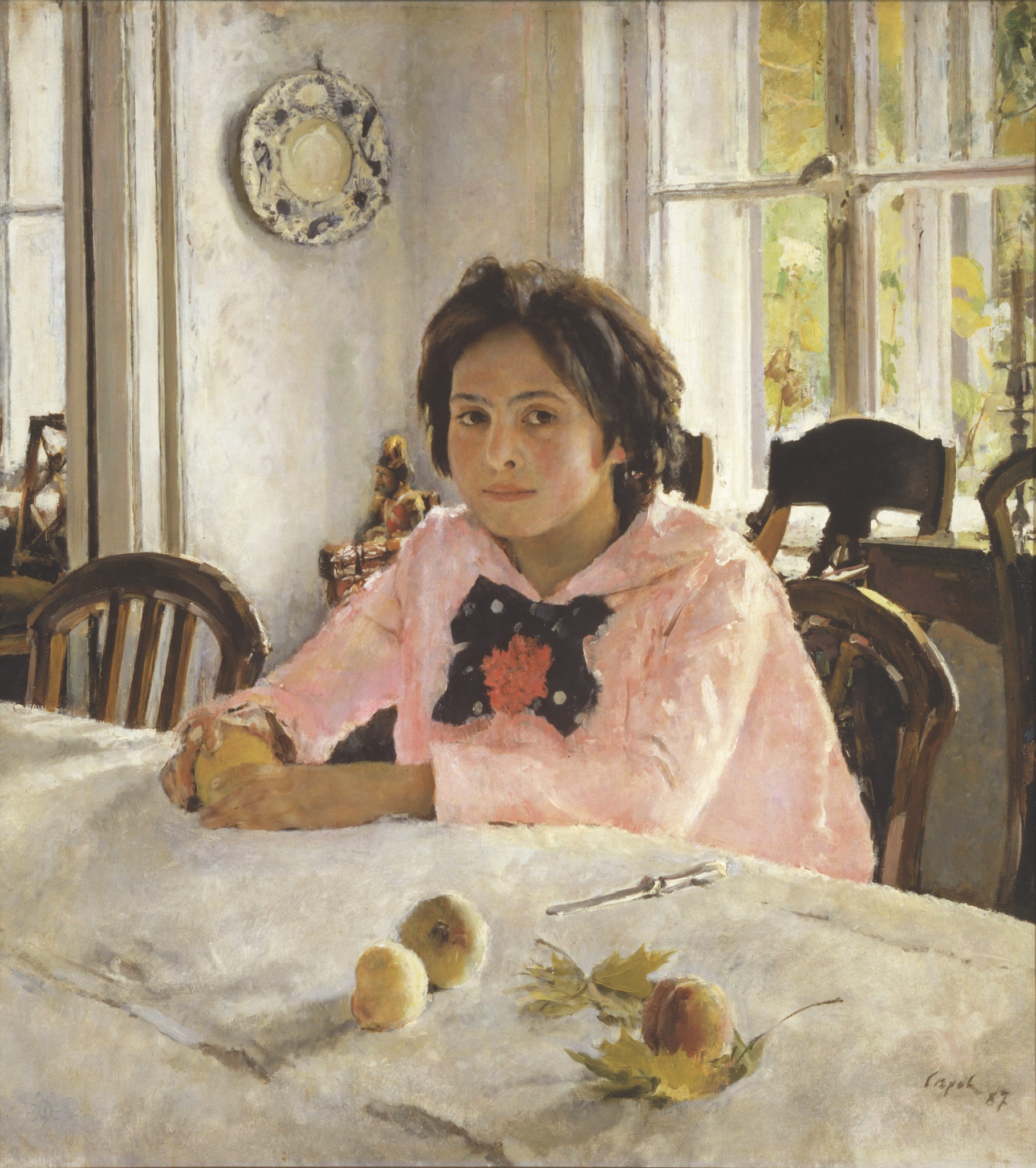
Valentin Serov, The Girl with Peaches, 1887

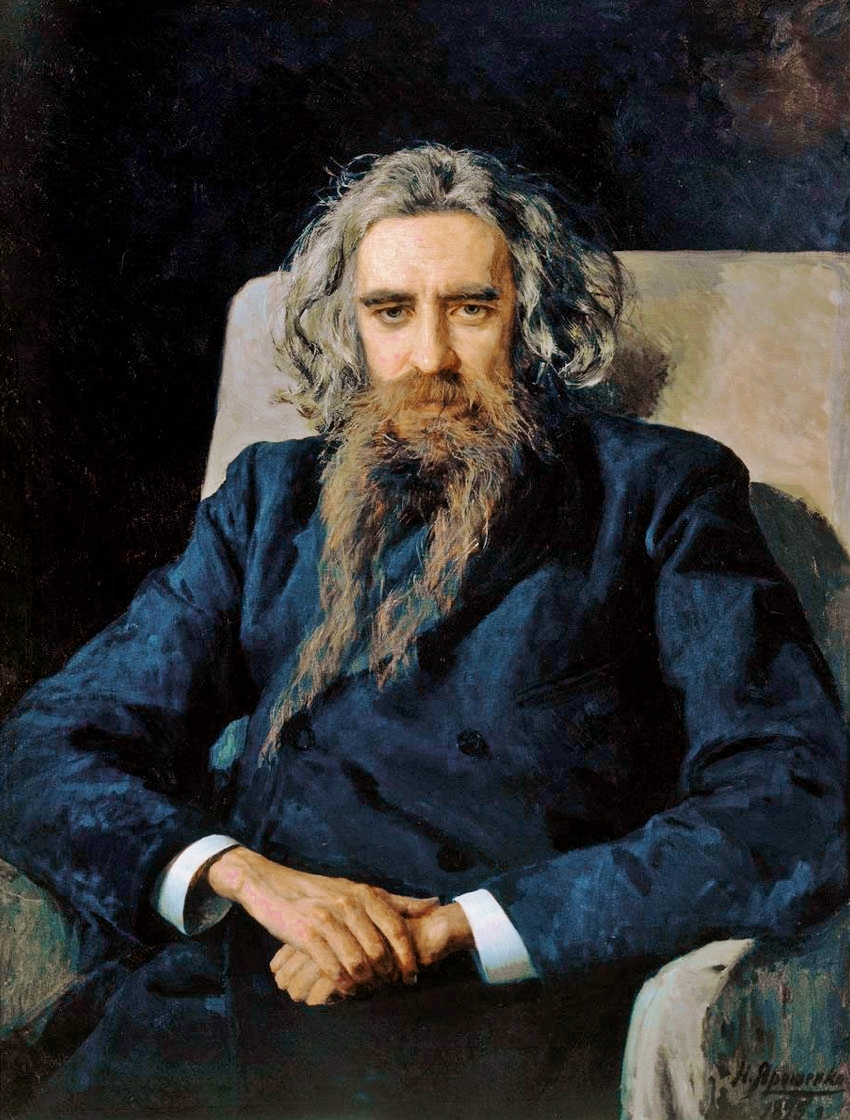
Nikolai Yaroshenko, Portrait of Vladimir Solovyov, 1892
Genre paintings

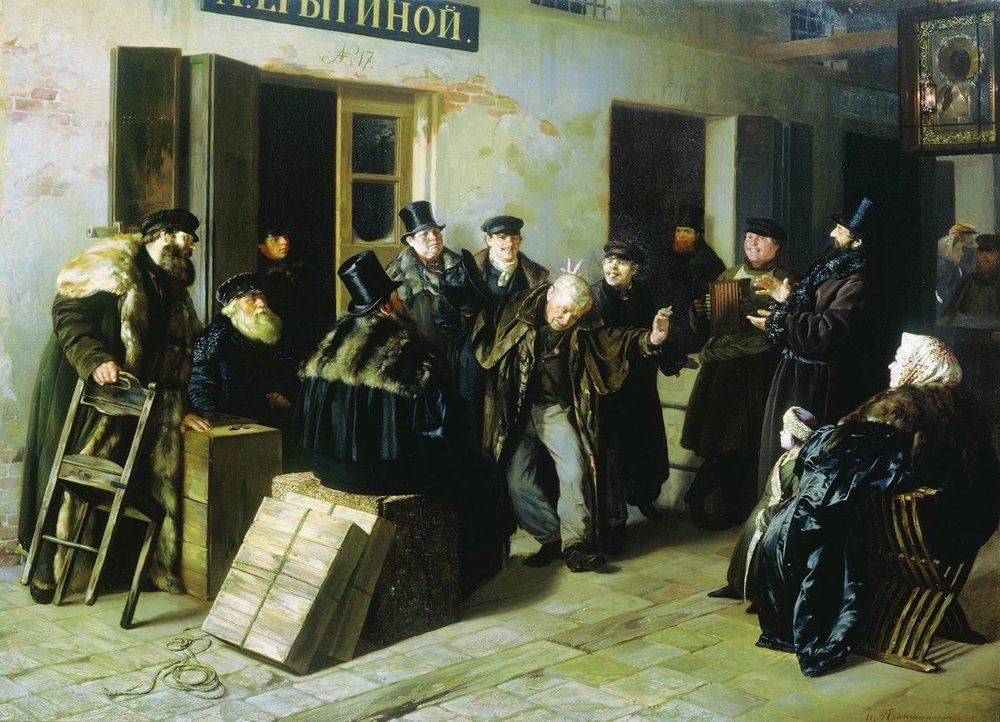
Illarion Pryanishnikov, Jokers. Gostiny Dvor in Moscow, 1865

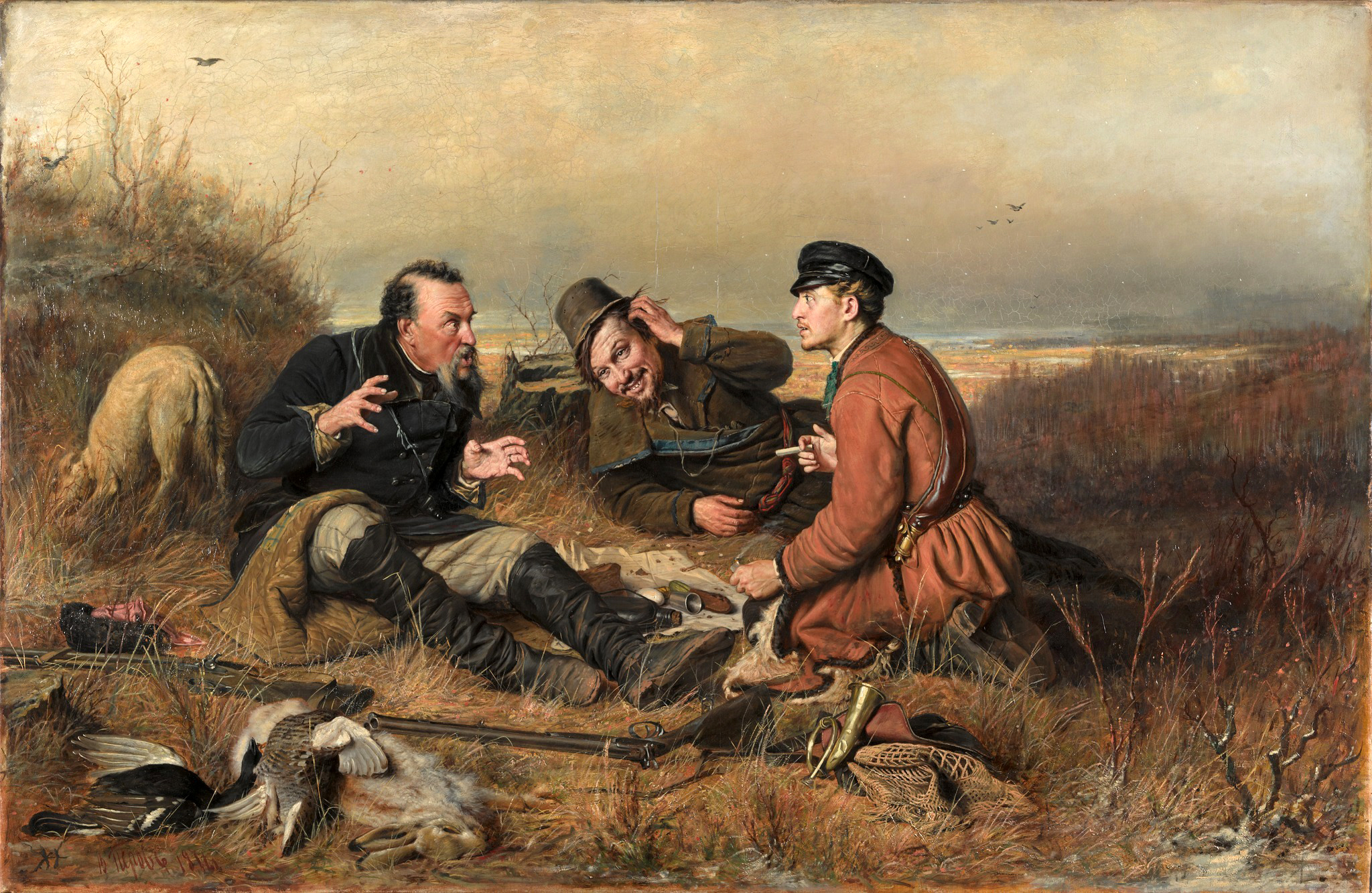
Vasily Perov, The Hunters at Rest, 1871

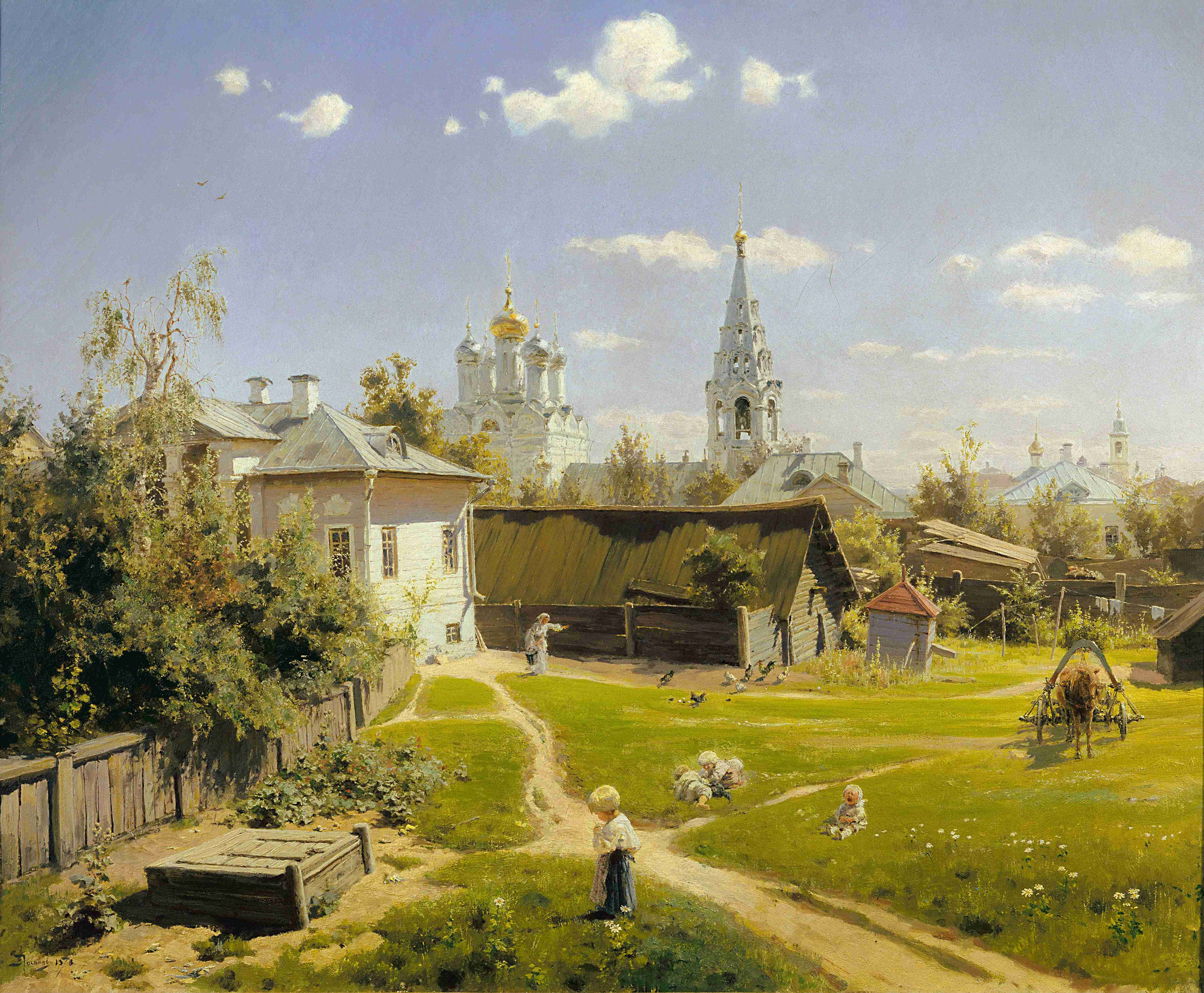
Vasily Polenov, Moscow Courtyard, 1878

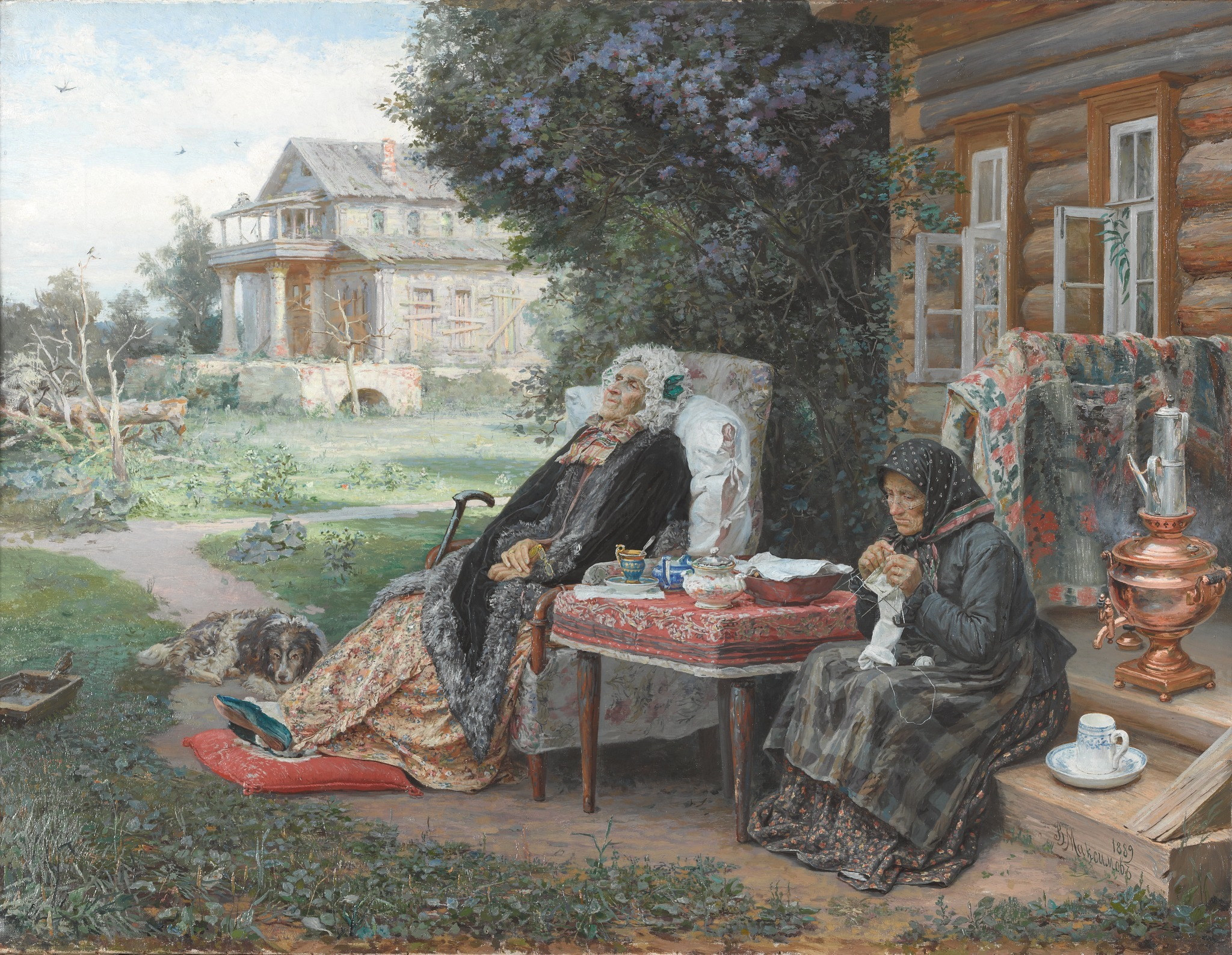
Vassily Maximov, Everything In the Past, 1889
History paintings

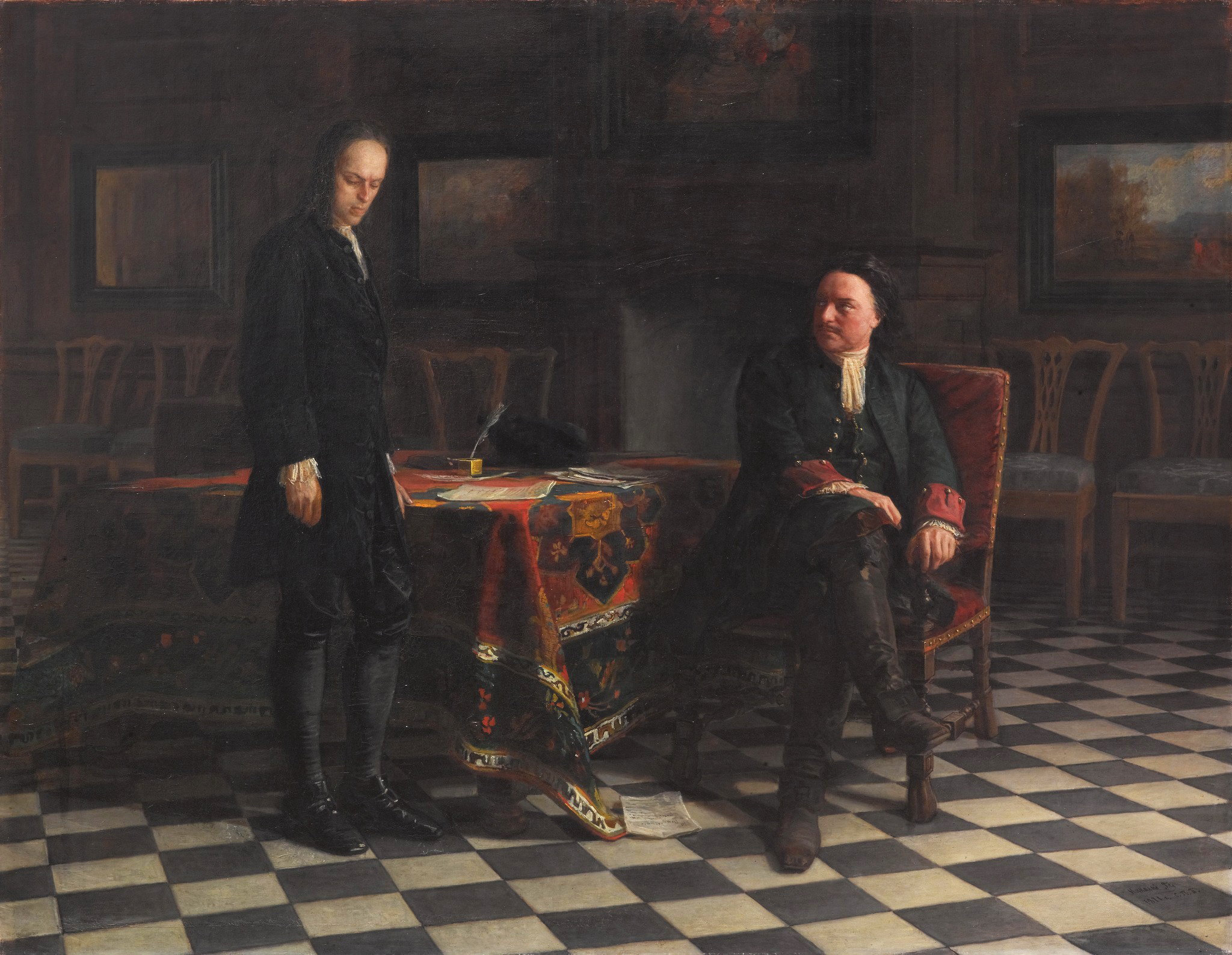
Nikolai Ge, Peter the Great Interrogating the Tsarevich Alexei Petrovich at Peterhof, 1871

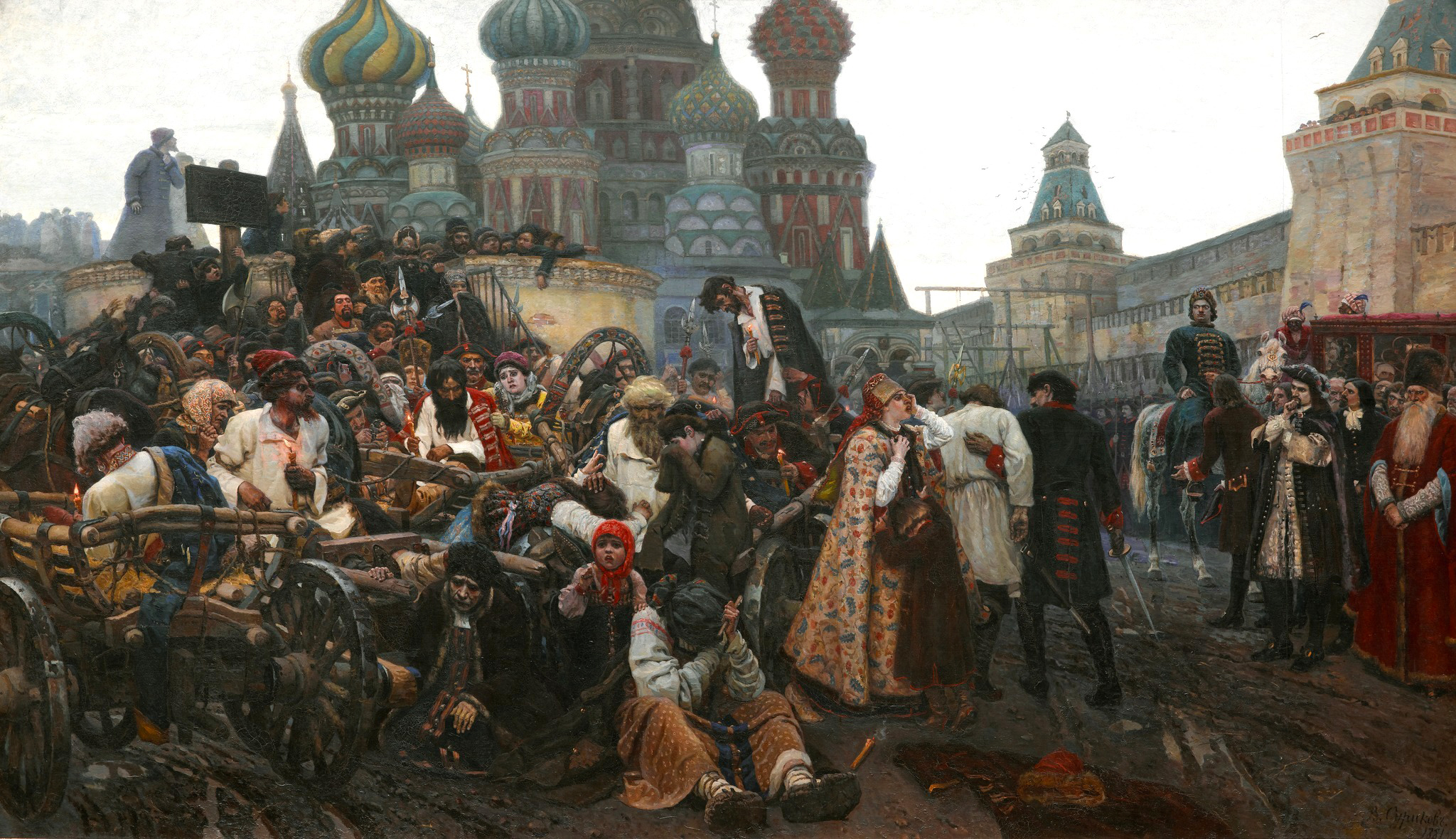
Vasily Surikov, The Morning of the Streltsy Execution, 1881

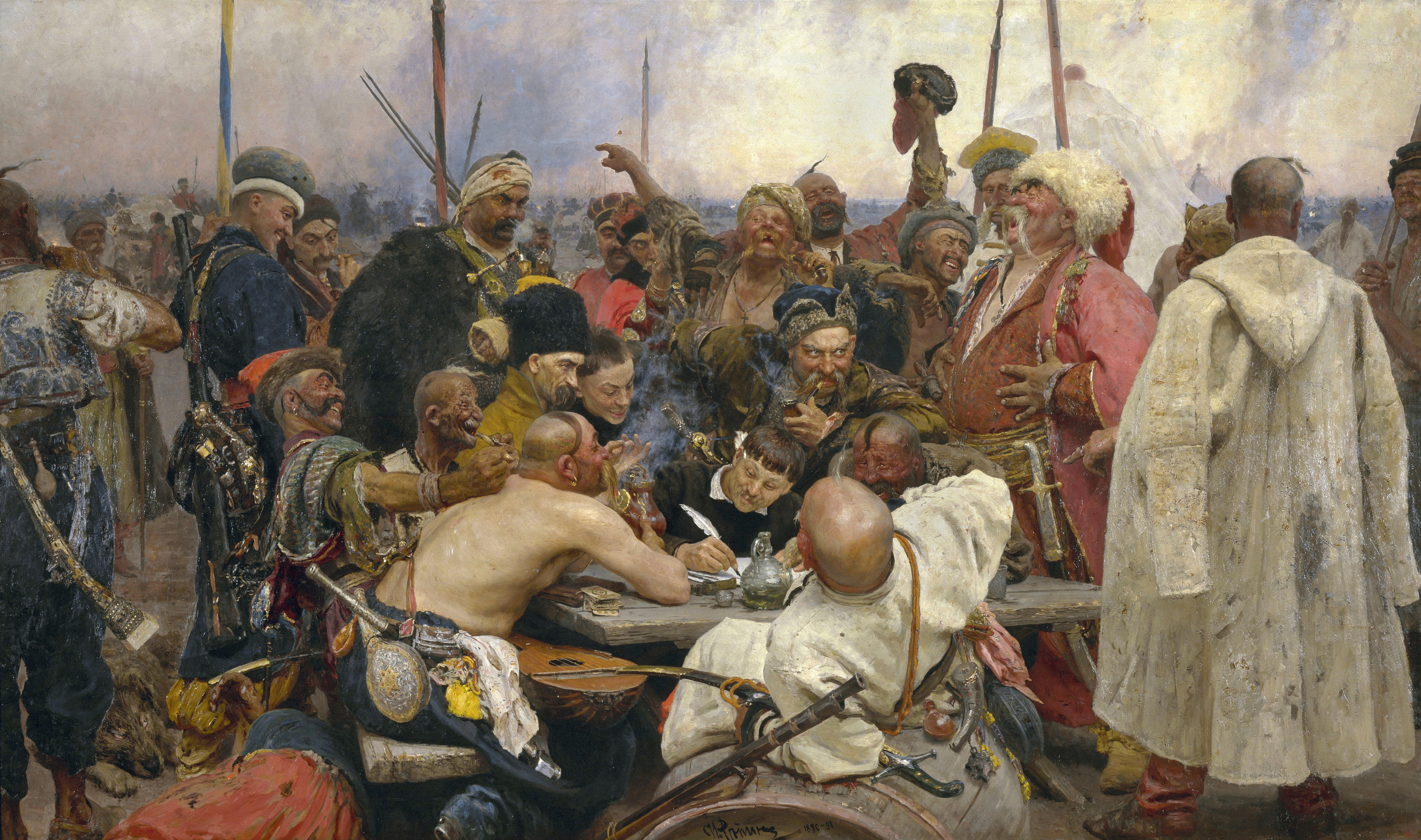
Ilya Repin, Reply of the Zaporozhian Cossacks, 1880–1891

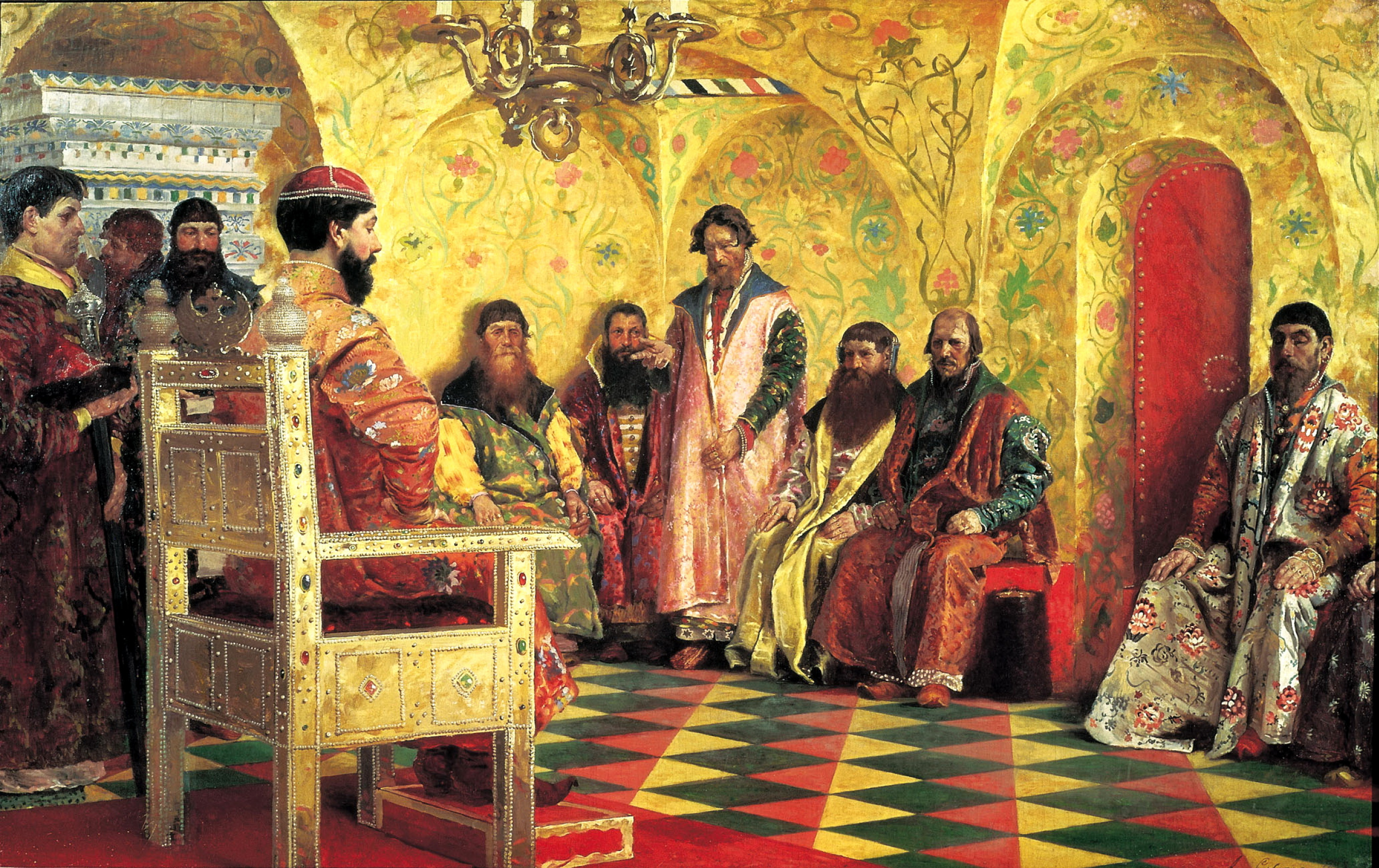
Andrei Ryabushkin, Session of Tsar Michael I with Boyar Duma, 1893
Fantasy paintings

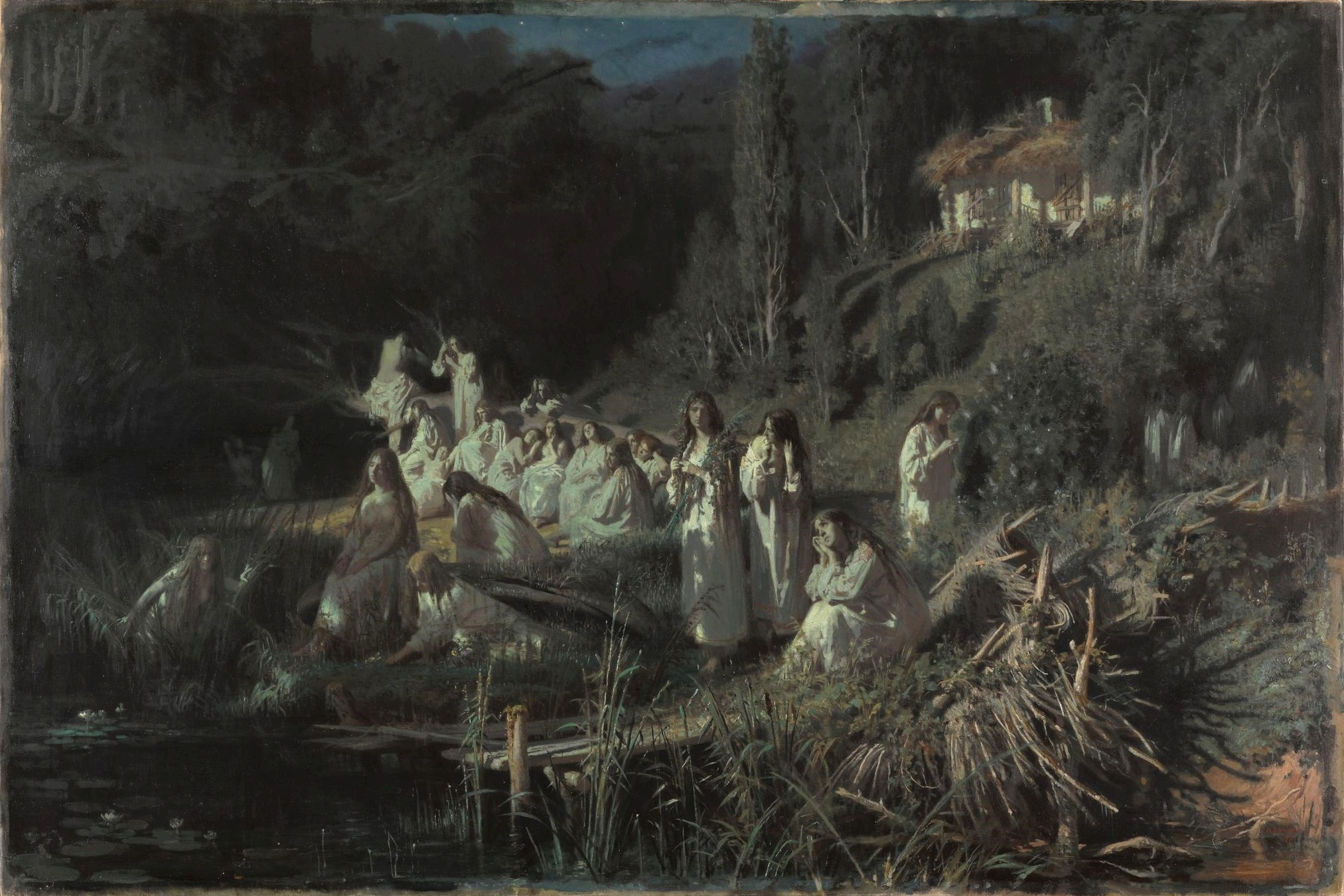
Ivan Kramskoi, The Mermaids, 1871

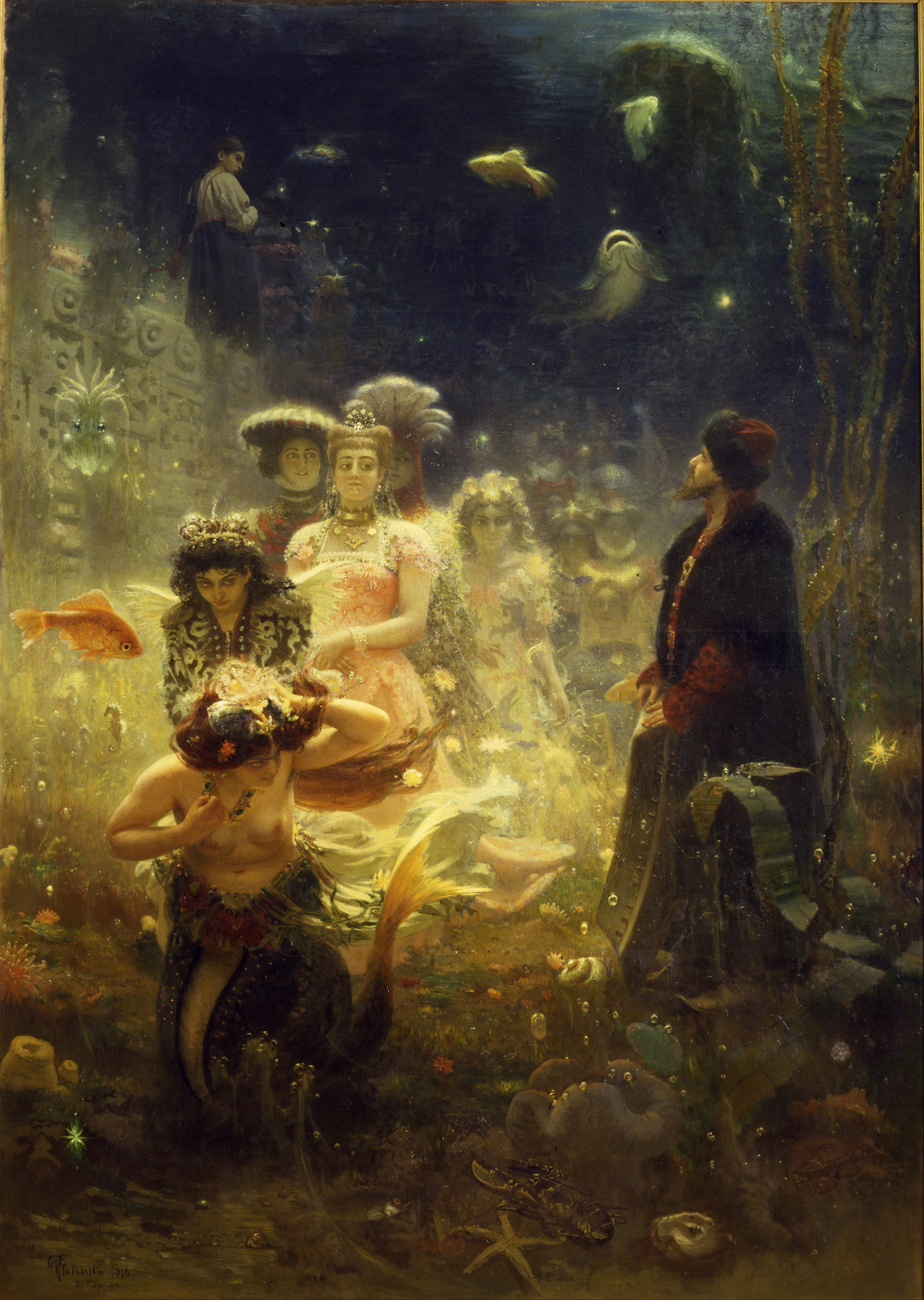
Ilya Repin, Sadko, 1876

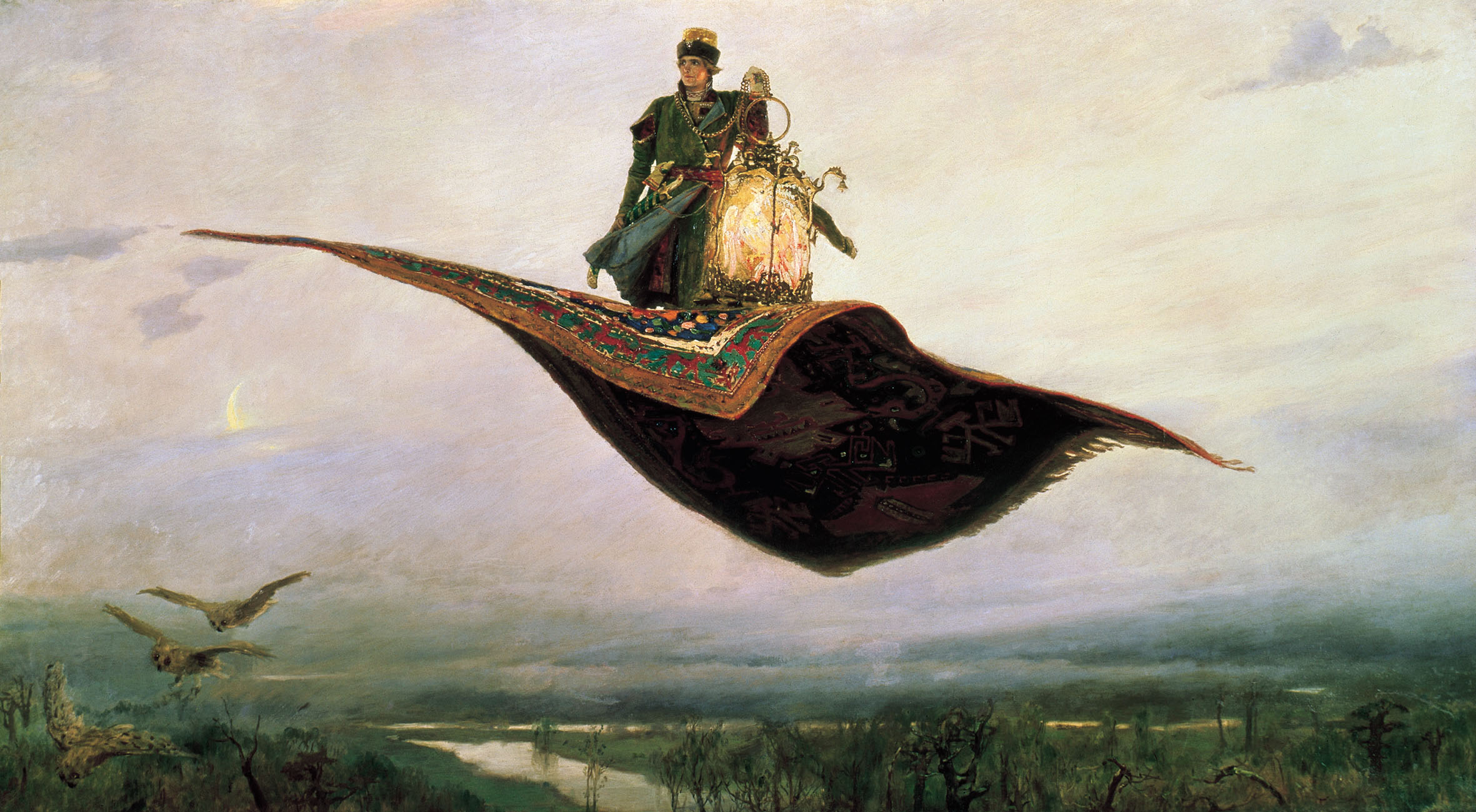
Viktor Vasnetsov, The Flying Carpet, 1890

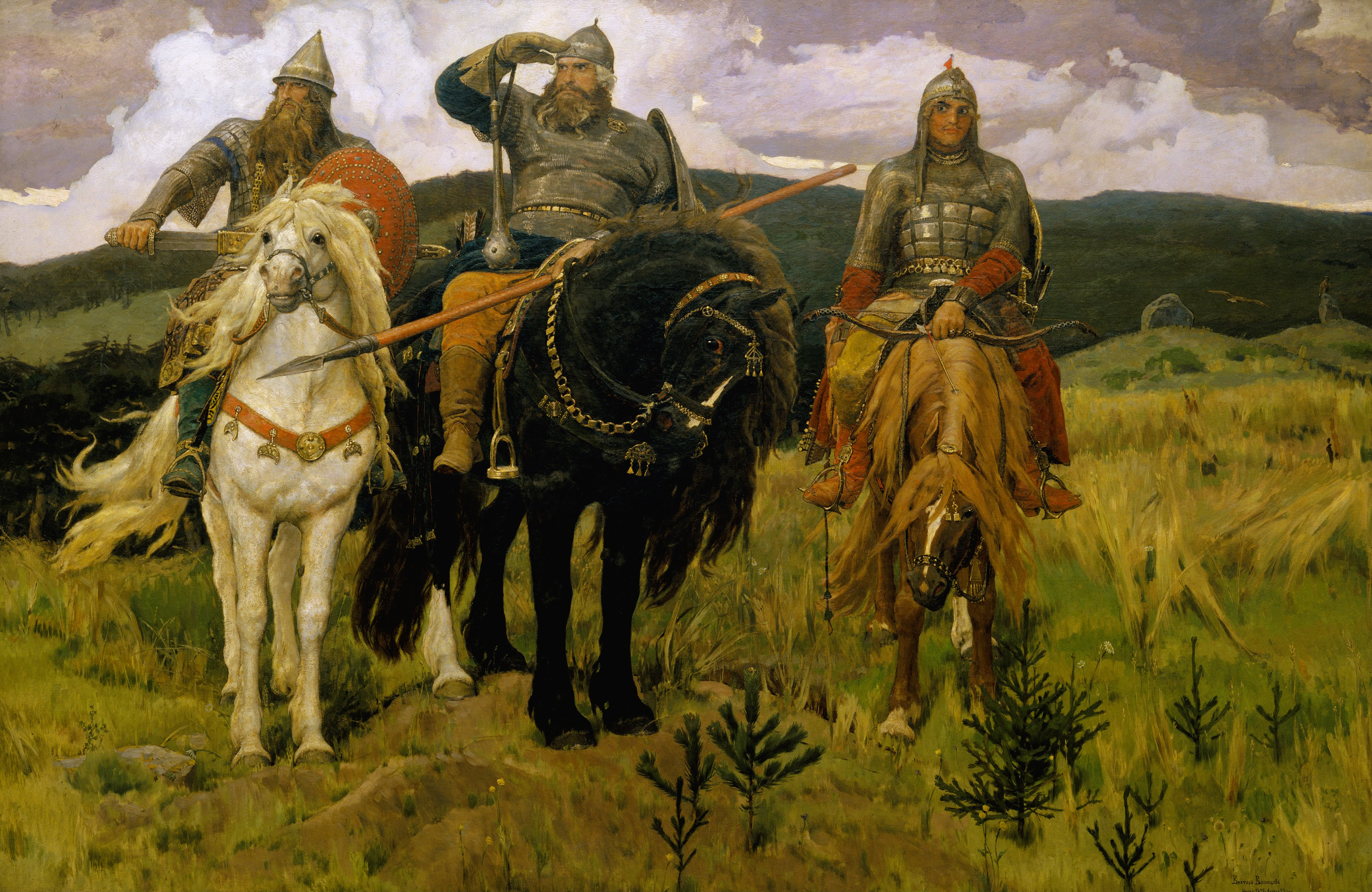
Viktor Vasnetsov, The Bogatyrs, 1898
Religious paintings

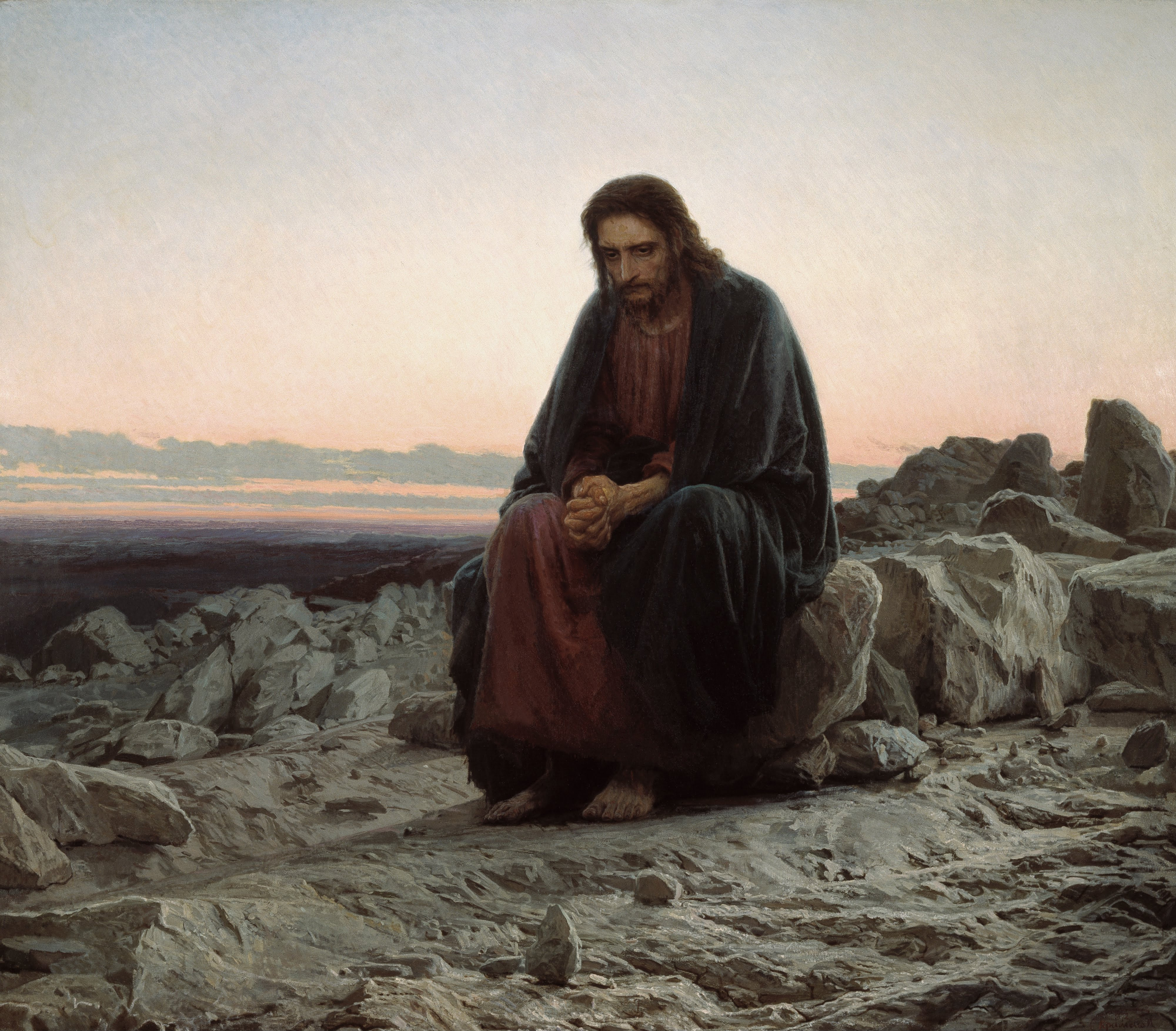
Ivan Kramskoi, Christ in the Desert, 1872

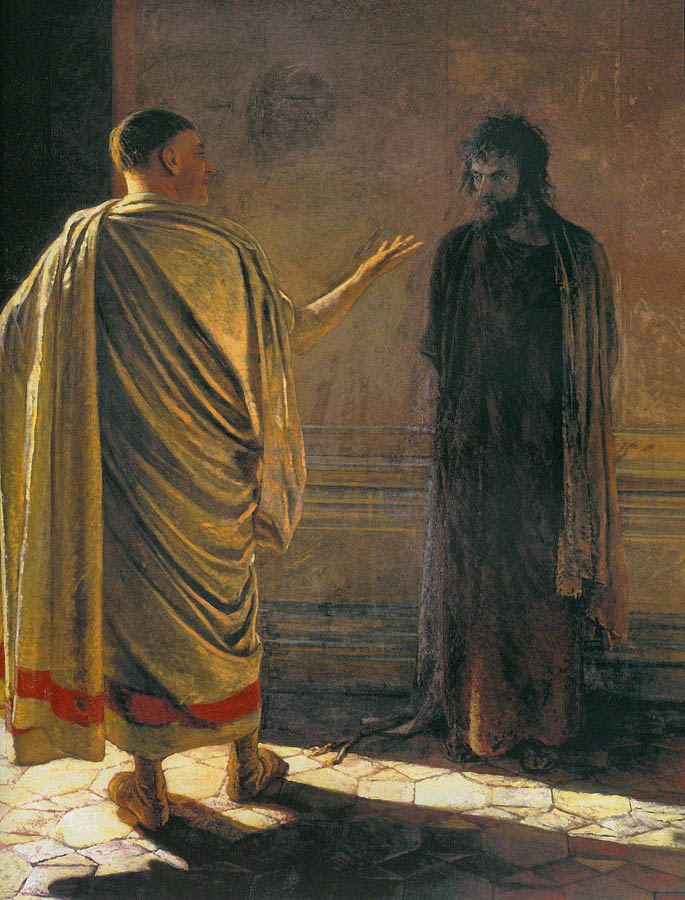
Nikolai Ge, What is Truth?, 1890

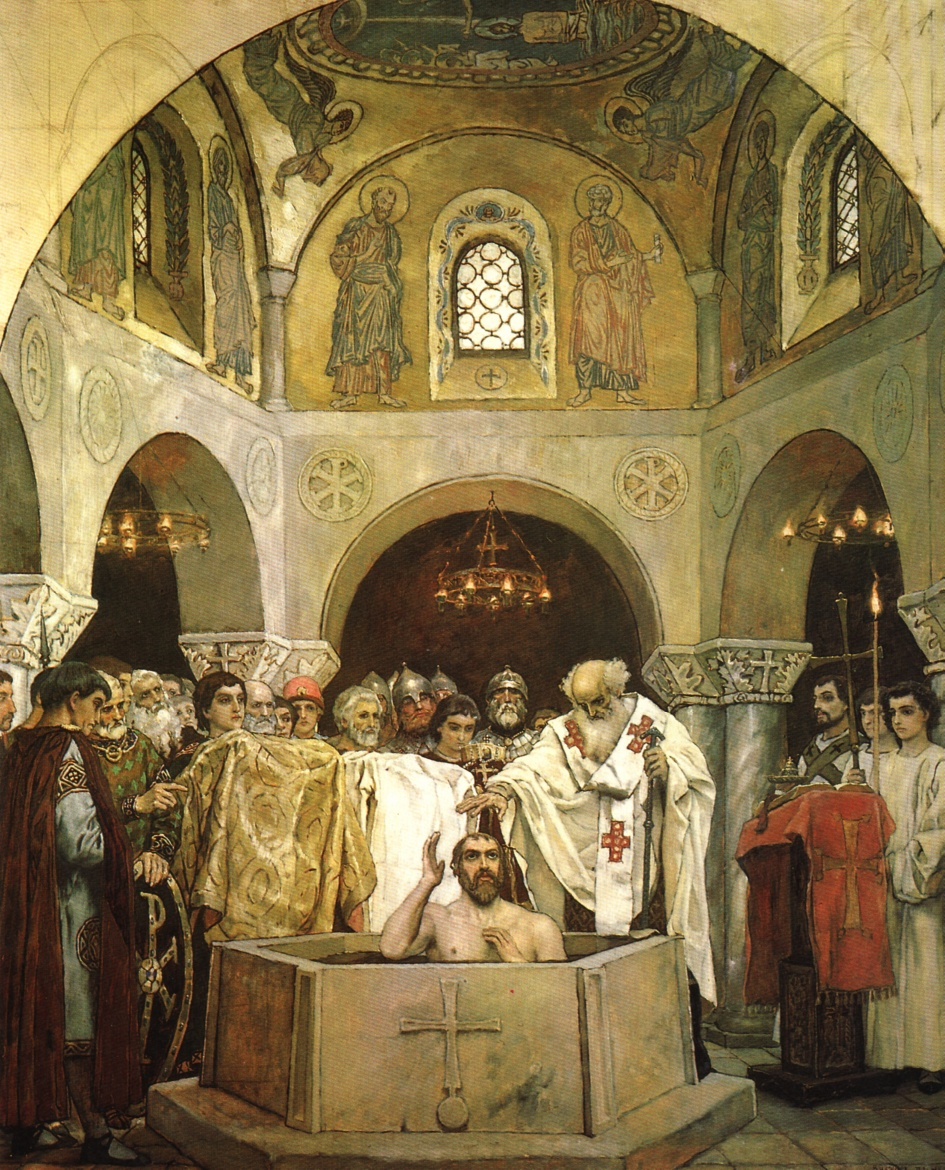
Viktor Vasnetsov, Baptism of Saint Prince Vladimir, 1890

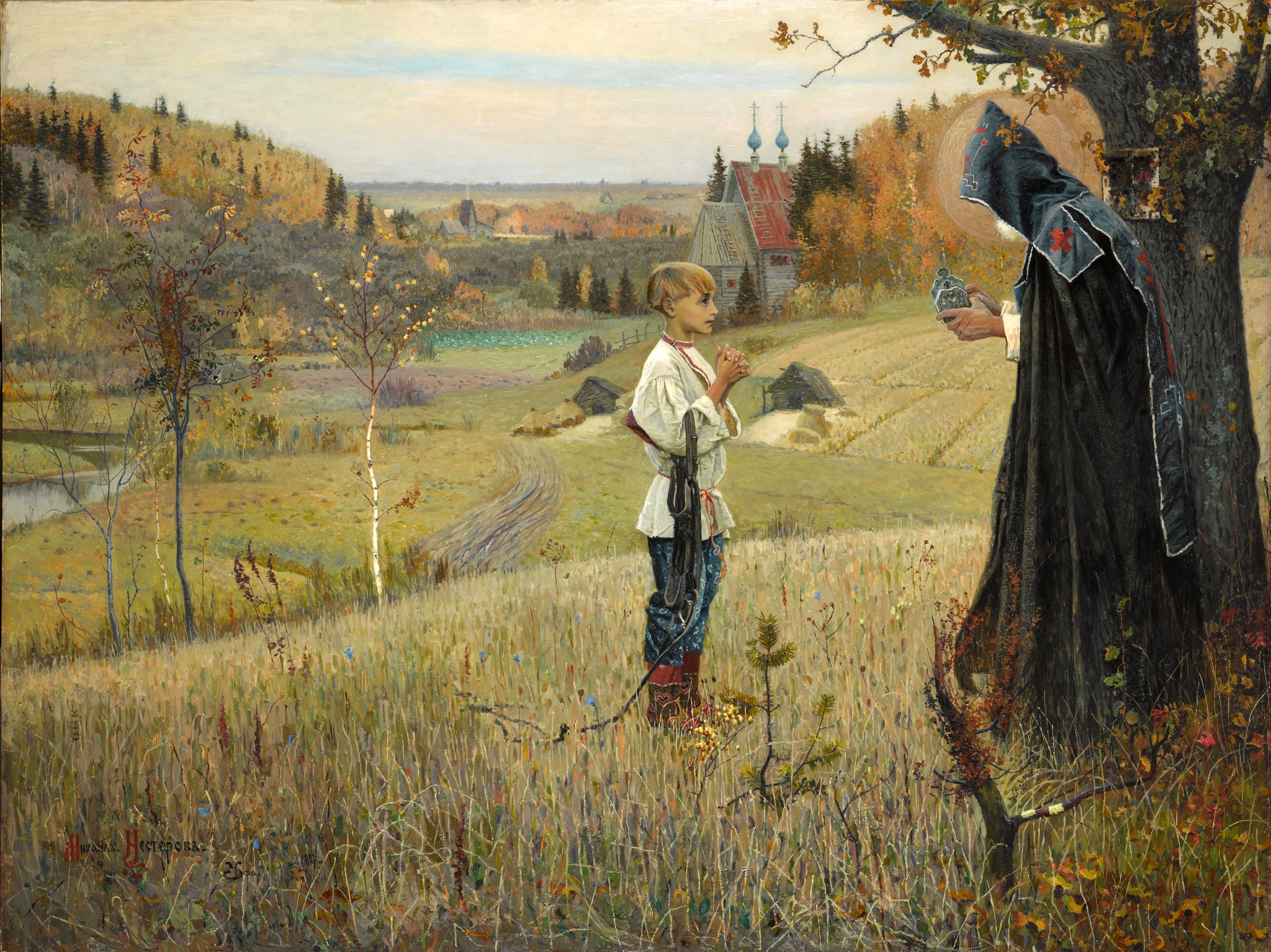
Mikhail Nesterov, The Vision to the Youth Bartholomew, 1890

== Members ==
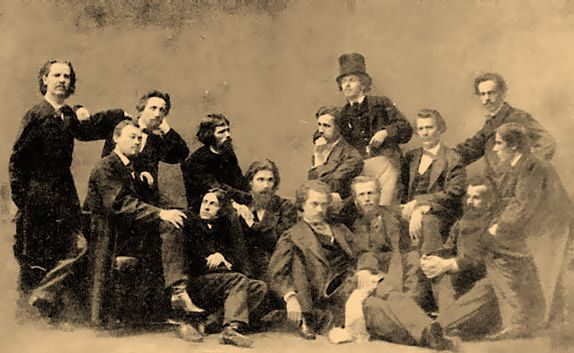
Artel of Artists (1863–1864) (from left to right): Bogdan Wenig, Firs Zhuravlev, Alexander Ivanovich Morozov, Kirill Lemokh, Ivan Kramskoi, Alexander Litovchenko, Konstantin Makovsky, Nikolai Dmitriev-Orenburgsky, Nikolai Petrovich Petrov, Vasily Kreitan, Mikhail Peskov, Nikolay Shustov, Alexei Korzukhin, Alexander Konstantinovich Grigoryev

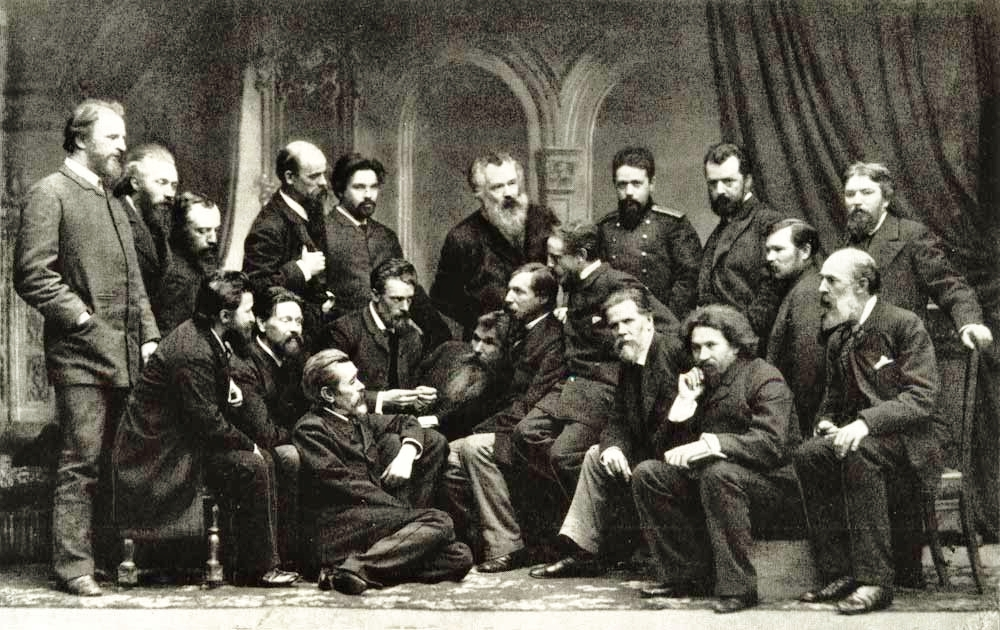
The Peredvizhniki (1885) (from left to right): Grigoriy Myasoyedov, Konstantin Savitsky, Vasily Polenov, Sergey Ammosov, Alexander Kiselyov, Yefim Volkov, Nikolai Nevrev, Vasily Surikov, Vladimir Makovsky, Alexander Litovchenko, Ivan Shishkin, Kirill Lemokh, Ivan Kramskoi, Nikolai Yaroshenko, Ilya Repin, Pavel Brullov, Pavel Ivachyov (manager of Peredvizhniki cooperative), Nikolay Makovsky, Alexander Beggrov

Peredvizhniki artists included:

- Abram Arkhipov
- Ivan Bogdanov
- Nikolay Bogdanov-Belsky
- Alexey Bogolyubov
- Pavel Brullov
- Nikolai Ge
- Kārlis Hūns
- Nikolay Kasatkin
- Alexander Kiselyov
- Ivan Kramskoi
- Arkhip Kuindzhi
- Nikolai Kuznetsov
- Isaac Levitan
- Alexander Litovchenko
- Vladimir Makovsky
- Vassily Maximov
- Grigoriy Myasoyedov
- Leonid Pasternak
- Vasily Perov
- Konstantin Pervukhin
- Vasily Polenov
- Illarion Pryanishnikov
- Ilya Repin
- Andrei Ryabushkin
- Antonina Rzhevskaya
- Konstantin Savitsky
- Alexei Savrasov
- Valentin Serov
- Emily Shanks
- Ivan Shishkin
- Alexei Stepanov
- Vasily Surikov
- Vitaly Tikhov
- Apollinary Vasnetsov
- Viktor Vasnetsov
- Yefim Volkov
- Nikolai Yaroshenko
- Nikolai Zagorsky
- Mykola Pymonenko

== See also ==
- List of Russian artists
- List of 19th-century Russian painters
- List of 20th-century Russian painters
