= Nikolai Zagorsky =

Russian painter (1849–1893)

- Николай Загорский
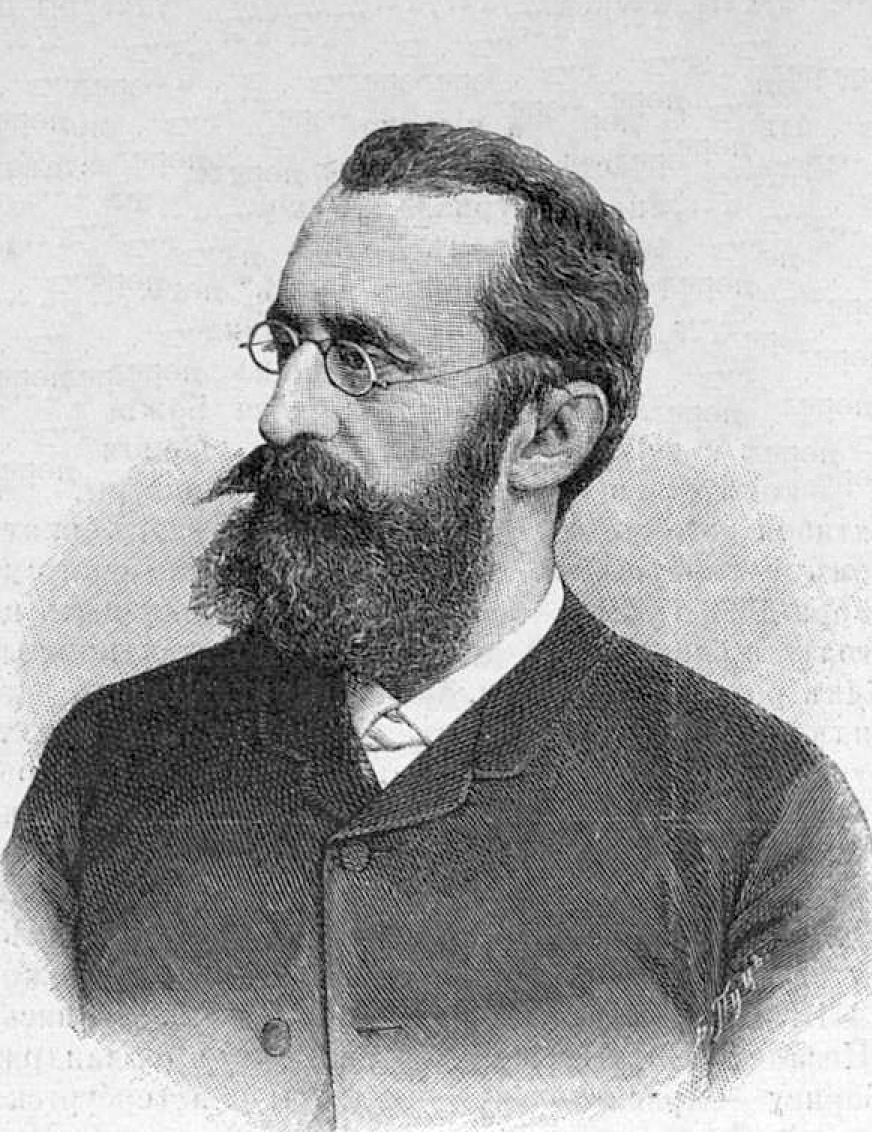
- Born: 20 November 1849; Saint Petersburg, Russian Empire
- Died: 30 December 1893 (aged 47); Saint Petersburg, Russian Empire
- Movement: Peredvizhniki

Nikolai Petrovich Zagorsky (Russian: Николай Петрович Загорский; 20 November 1849 – 30 December 1893) was a genre painter from the Russian Empire.

== Biography ==
Nikolai Zagorsky was born on 20 November 1849 in Saint Petersburg. His father was a landowner from the Ryazan Governorate. In 1849 Nikolai Zagorsky enrolled in the Imperial Academy of Arts and from 1875 began participating in the Academy's exhibitions. In 1891, he joined the Society for Travelling Art Exhibitions (Peredvizhniki).

Zagorsky died in Saint Petersburg on 30 December 1893.

== Works ==
Zagorsky created mainly genre paintings, and also draw portraits. In addition, he painted for the Petersburg magazines Pchela and Sever. Zagorsky is the author of illustrations for the Big Album to the Works of A. S. Pushkin.

The artist's works are held in the collections of museums in Russia and Ukraine.

== Gallery ==
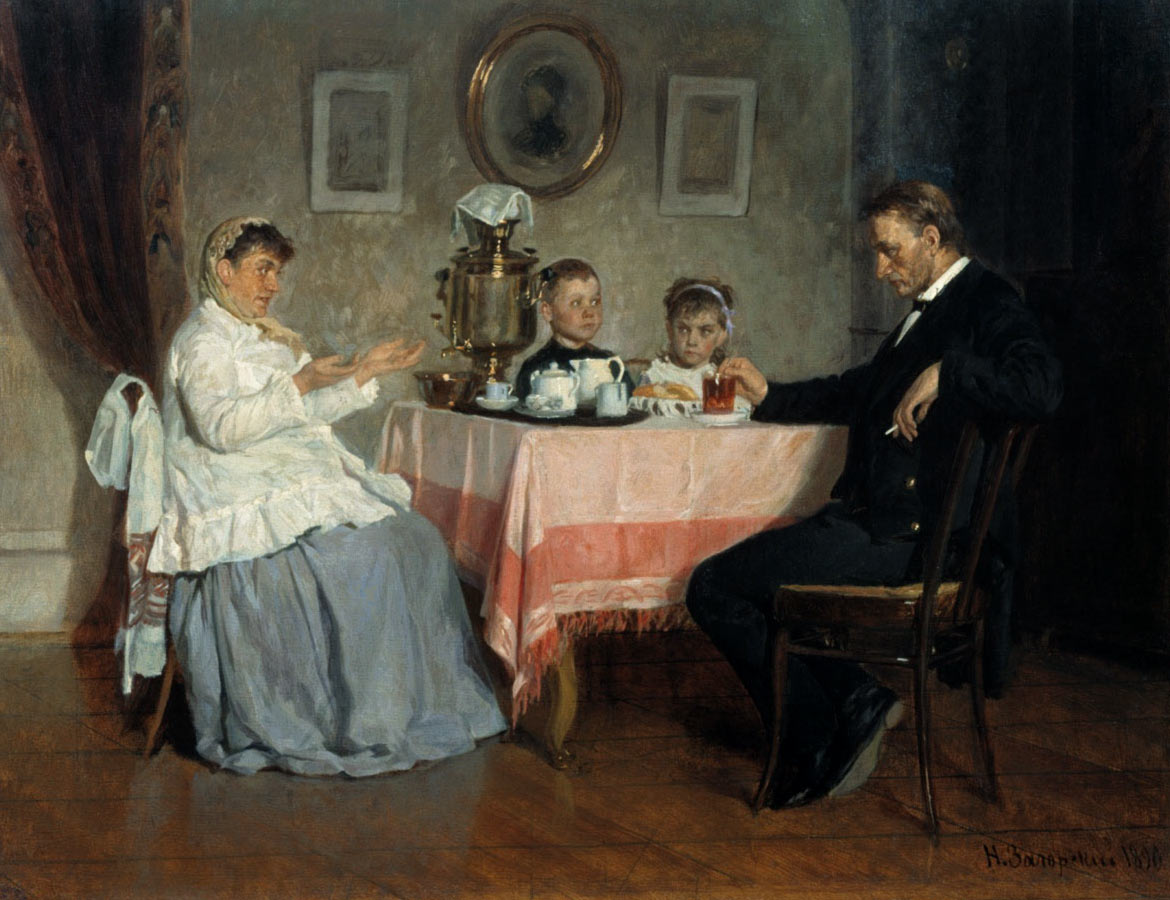

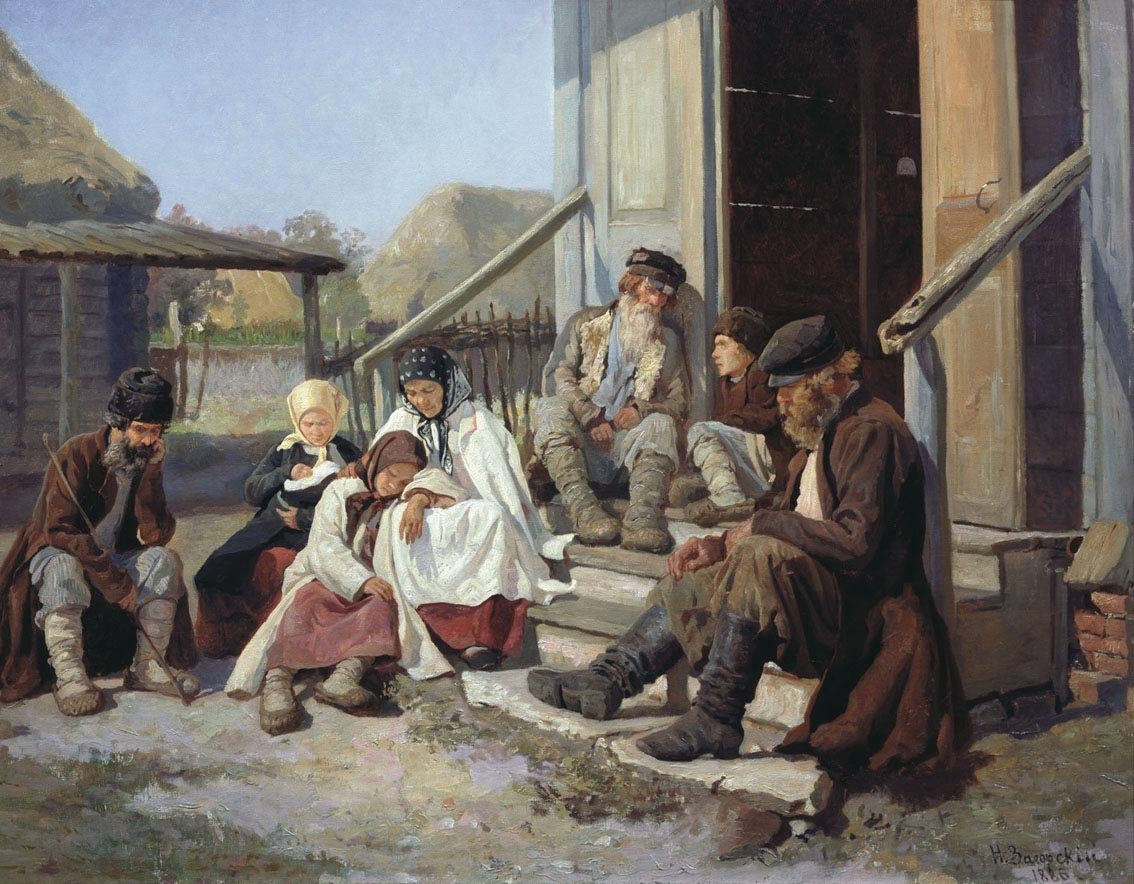

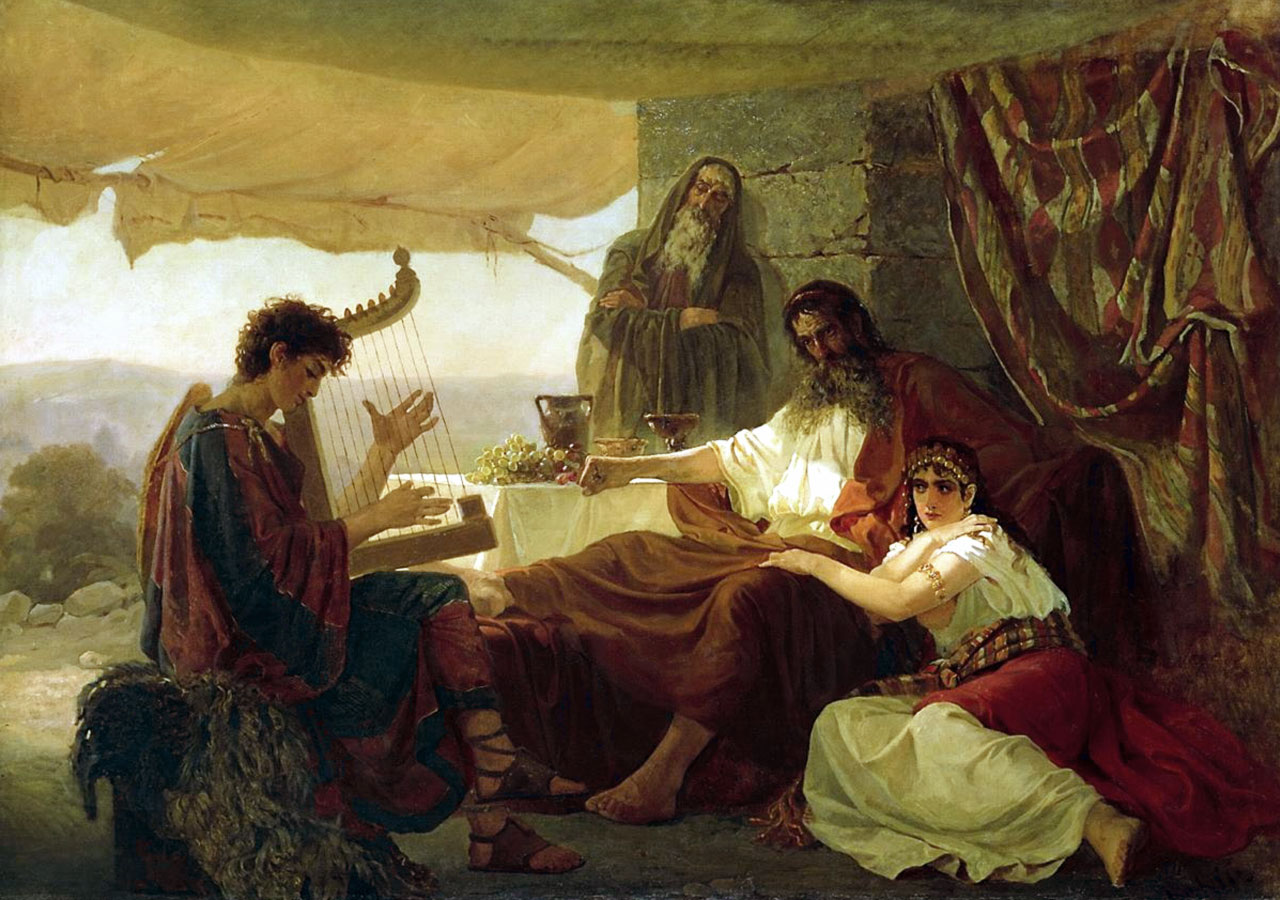

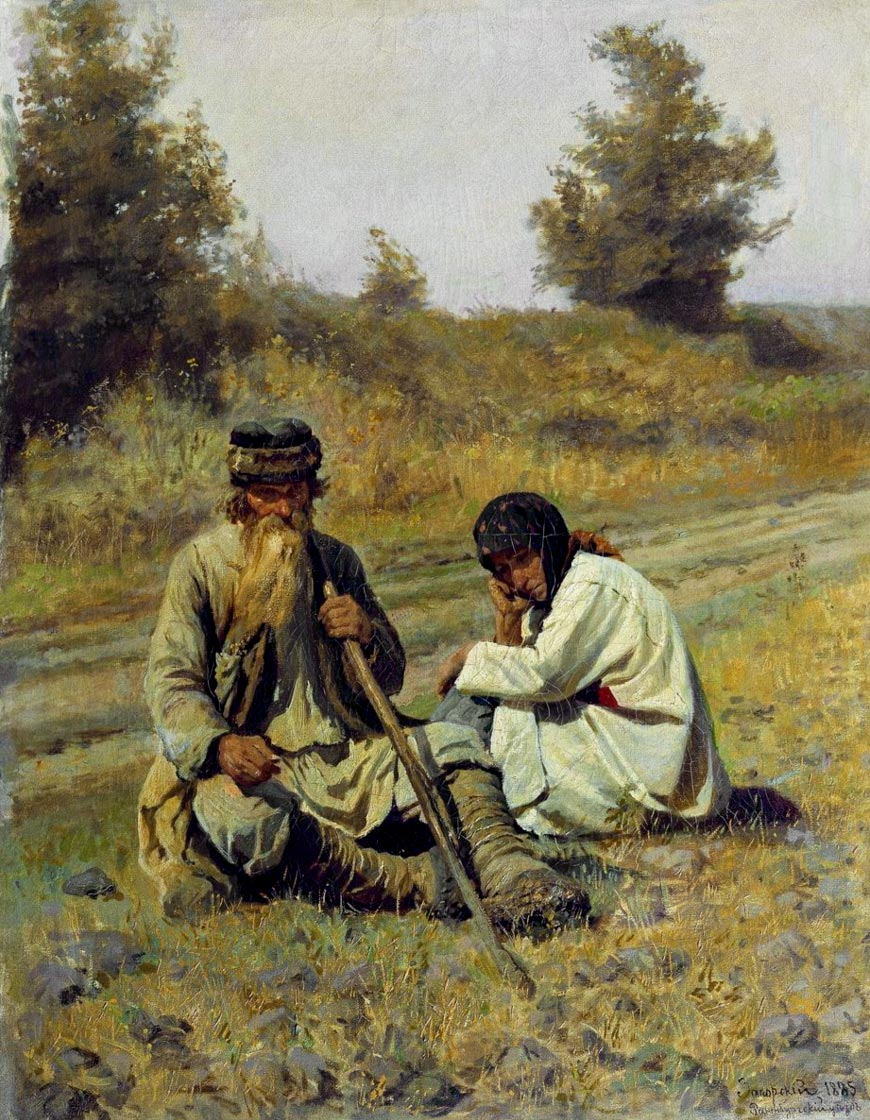

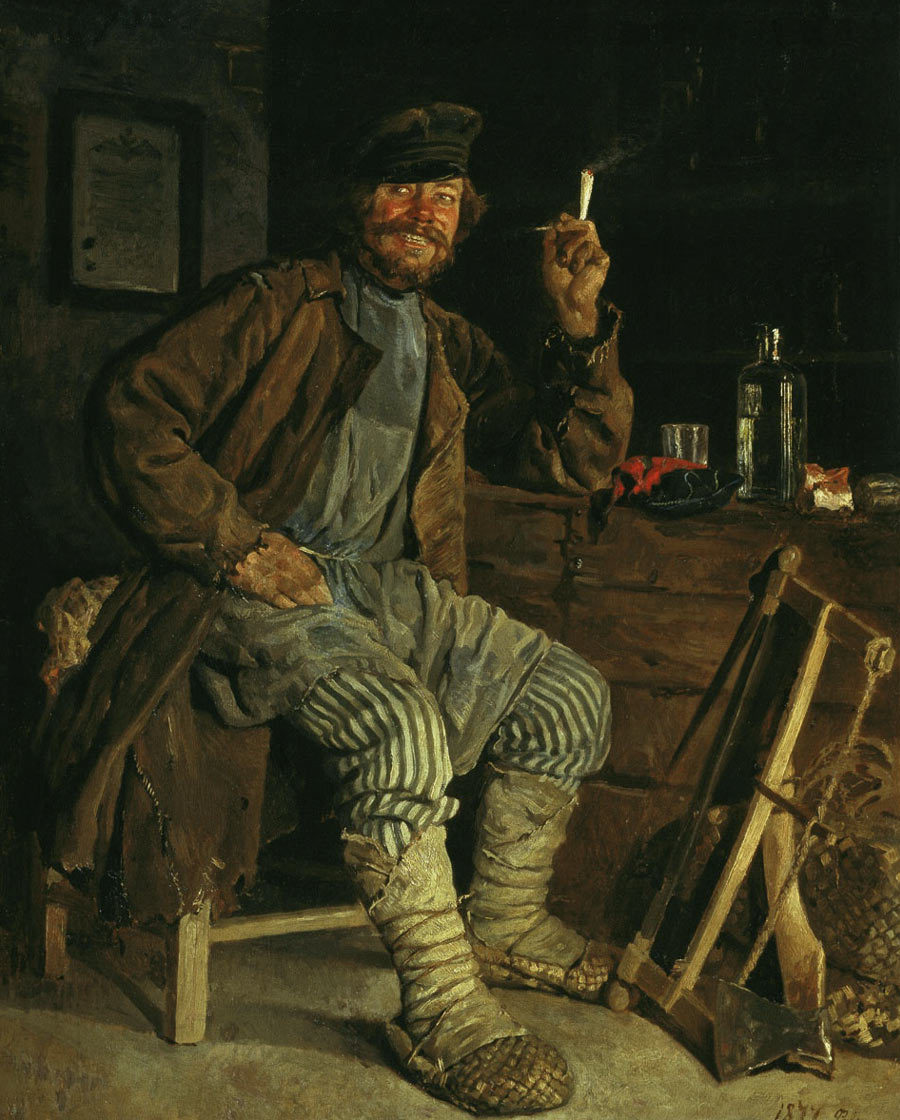

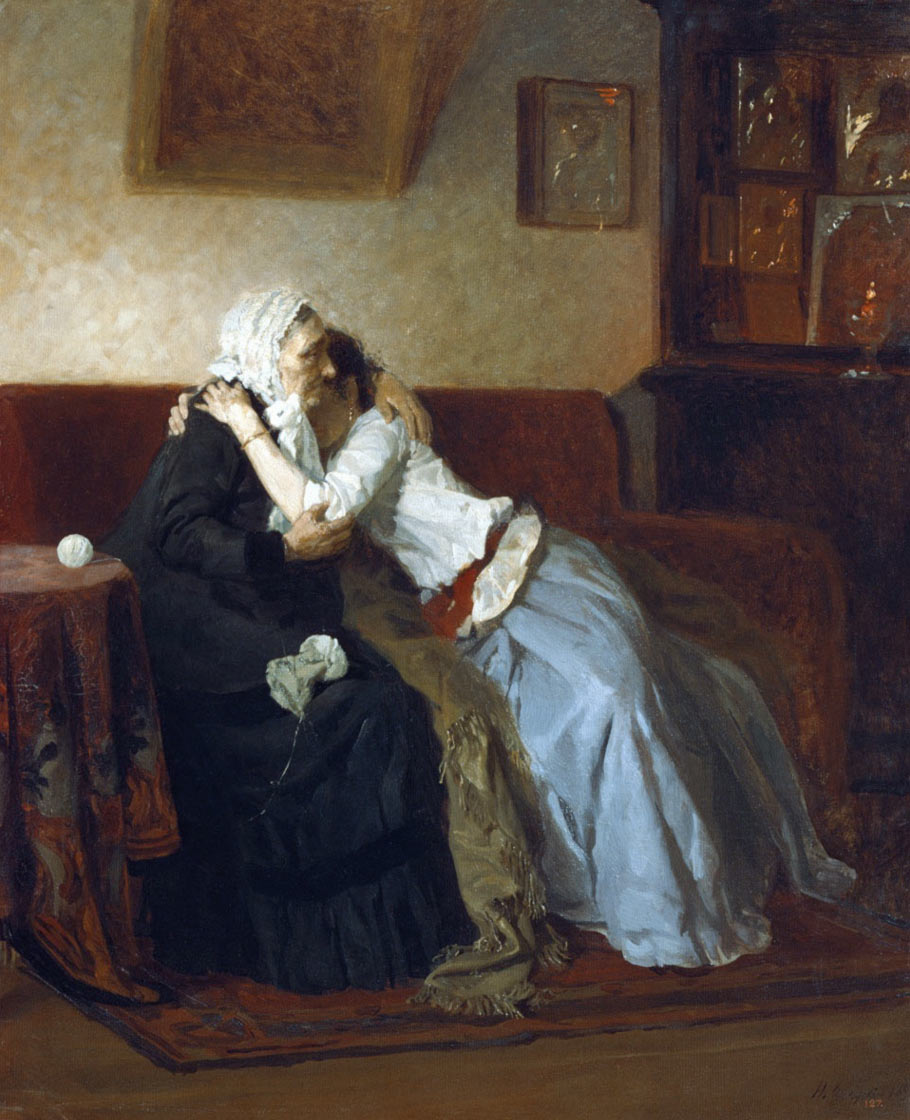

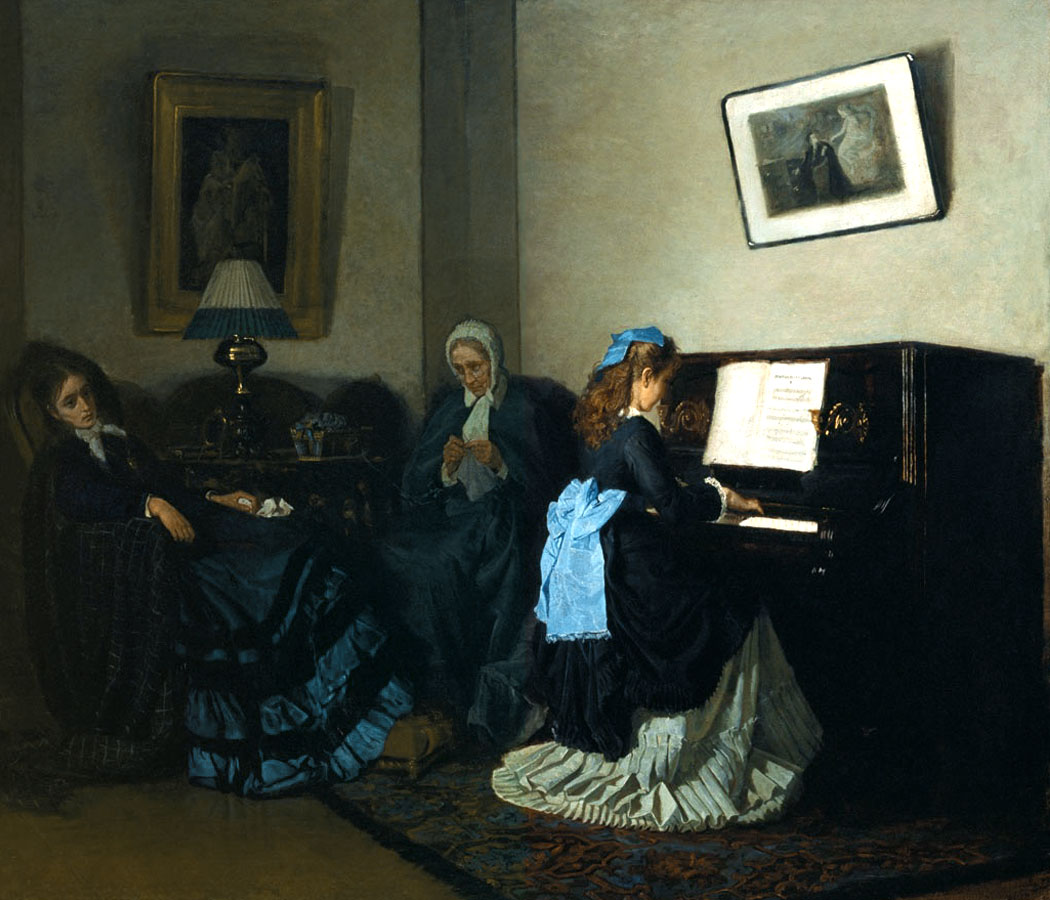
