= Makovsky =

Makovsky (from mak meaning English: poppy), derived of the Polish surname Makowski, is a habitational name for someone from a place called Makov.

It is the surname of a Russian artistic family (Russian: Маковский):

- Egor Makovsky (1802-1866), amateur painter and accountant, father of:
  - Alexandra Makovskaya (1837–1915), Russian landscape painter
  - Konstantin Makovsky (1839–1915), Russian history and portrait painter, father of:
    - Sergey Makovsky (1877–1962), Russian poet, art critic, and organizer of many art expositions.
    - Elena Luksch-Makovskaya (1878-1967), Russian painter and sculptor, residing in Germany.
  - Nikolay Makovsky (1842–1886), Russian genre painter
  - Vladimir Makovsky (1846–1920), Russian genre painter and art collector, father of:
    - Aleksandr Makovsky (1869–1924), Russian painter

Makovský is used by Czech people:

- Vincenc Makovský (1900–1966), Czech sculptor and designer
- Michal Makovský (born 1976), former Czech motorcycle speedway rider
- Miloš Makovský (born 1957), Czech rock guitarist

Other people with the same last name:

- Judianna Makovsky (born 1967), American costume designer
- Zach Makovsky, American mixed martial arts fighter
