= Makowski =

The Coat of Arms of the Maków County in Poland shows the Poppy flower from which the name originates, alongside the Polish eagle.

Makowski (feminine: Makowska; plural: Makowscy) is a Polish surname with regional variations across Slavic countries, such as Makovsky in Russia.

== Etymology ==
The surname Makowski relates to a location, as it was common among nobility (the suffix -ski being the equivalent of the English "of", the Germanic "von" and the French "de"). In this case, it is likely indicating one of the towns named Maków or Makowo.

The etymological root "Mak" translates to "Poppy" in Slavic languages.

== Related surnames ==
Language	Masculine	Feminine
Polish	Makowski	Makowska
Belarusian (Romanization)	Макоўскі (Makoŭski, Makowski)	Макоўская (Makouskaya, Makoŭskaja, Makowskaya)
Czech/Slovak	Makovský	Makovská
Hungarian	Makovszky, Makovszki	
Latvian	Makovskis	Makovska
Lithuanian	Makauskas	Makauskienė (married); Makauskaitė (unmarried)
Macedonian	Маковски (Makovski)	Маковска (Makovska)
Romanian/Moldovan	Macovschi, Macovschii	
Russian (Romanization)	Маковский (Makovskiy, Makovskii, Makovskij, Makovsky, Makovski)	Маковская (Makovskaya, Makovskaia, Makovskaja)
Ukrainian (Romanization)	Маковський (Makovskyi, Makovskyy, Makovskyj, Makovsky)	Маковська (Makovska)
Other	Makowsky, Makofsky, Makofski	

== Coat of Arms ==
The "Polish Armorial" reference by the heraldist Kasper Niesiecki lists several noble (szlachta) people with the name Makowski belonging to different heraldic clans (herb), including:

- Makowski: Niesiecki mentions the captain of the cavalry Tomasz Makowski, ennobled in 1662.
- Jelita
- Gryf and Ogończyk

== People ==
=== Arts ===
- The Russified Polish members of the Makovsky artist family, including:
  - Egor Makovsky (1802–1866), amateur painter and accountant, father of:
    - Alexandra Makovskaya (1837–1915), Russian landscape painter
    - Konstantin Makovsky (1839–1915), Russian history and portrait painter, father of:
      - Sergey Makovsky (1877–1962), Russian poet, art critic, and organizer of art expositions
      - Elena Luksch-Makovskaya (1878–1967), Russian painter and sculptor
    - Nikolay Makovsky (1842–1886), Russian genre painter
    - Vladimir Makovsky (1846–1920), Russian genre painter and art collector, father of:
      - Aleksandr Makovsky (1869–1924), Russian painter
- Tadeusz Makowski (1882–1932), Polish painter
- Helena Makowska (1893–1964), Polish actress
- Zbigniew Makowski (1930–2019), Polish painter

=== Academia ===
- Jan Makowski (1588–1644), Polish philologist
- Szymon Stanisław Makowski (?-1683), Polish theologist
- Johann Makowsky (born 1948), Hungarian mathematician
- Liza Makowski, American scientist

=== Military ===
- Stanislaw Makowski (1914–1944), Polish member of the French Resistance

=== Politics ===
- Stanley Makowski (1923–1981), American politician
- Andrzej Gąsienica-Makowski (born 1952), Polish politician

=== Sports ===
- Grażyna Staszak-Makowska (born 1953), Polish fencer
- Greg Makowski (born 1956), American soccer player
- Maria Makowska (born 1969), Polish footballer

=== Others ===
- Tomasz Makowski (cartograph) (1575–1630), Polish cartograph
- Tomasz Makowski (librarian) (born 1970), Polish librarian
- Michael Makowski (born 1983), Australian entrepreneur and television personality
