= Alexandra Makovskaya =

Russian artist (1837–1915)

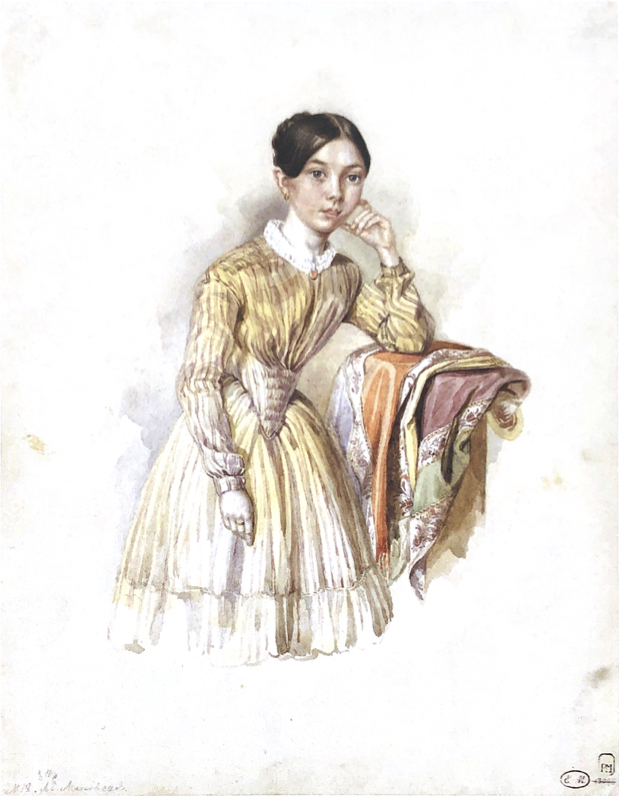
Egor Makovsky, Alexandra Makovskaya, 1850s, watercolor on cardboard; Russian Museum, St. Petersburg

Alexandra Yegorovna Makovskaya (Russian: Алекса́ндра Его́ровна Мако́вская; 1837 in Moscow – 1915 in Moscow) was a Russian landscape painter.

== Biography ==
Makovskaya was the eldest child of Egor Makovsky, one of the founders of the Moscow School of Painting, Sculpture and Architecture. He encouraged all of his children to become artists and gave them lessons. Alexandra, Konstantin, Nikolay and Vladimir followed in his footsteps. His youngest child, Mariya, became an actress.

After her parents were divorced, Makovskaya lived with her mother in Saint Petersburg. In 1866, she began to exhibit her paintings at the Imperial Academy of Arts. She also exhibited with the Peredvizhniki from 1878 to 1893 and the Moscow Society of Lovers of Fine Art from 1881 to 1896. After 1902, she participated in the showings of Mir Iskusstva. Sources differ as to whether she died in Saint Petersburg or returned to Moscow at the beginning of World War I. Her works have never been catalogued.

In 1997, a major retrospective of works by the entire Makovsky family was held at the Tretyakov Gallery.

== Gallery ==
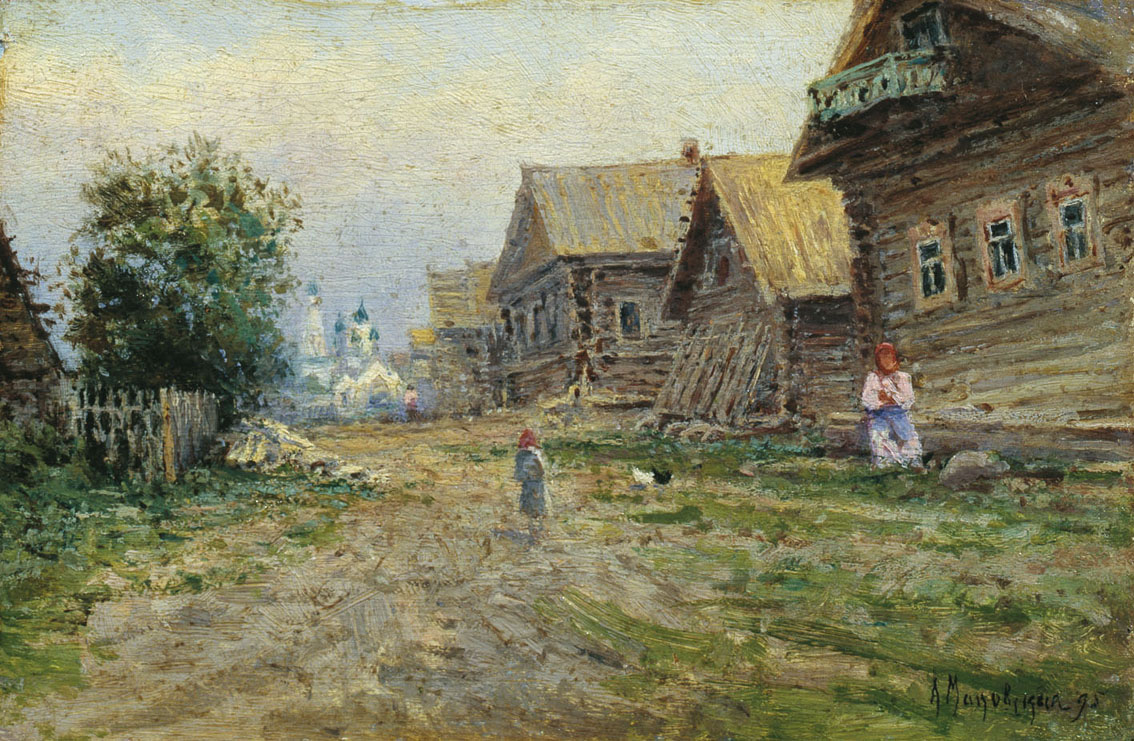
The Village, 1895

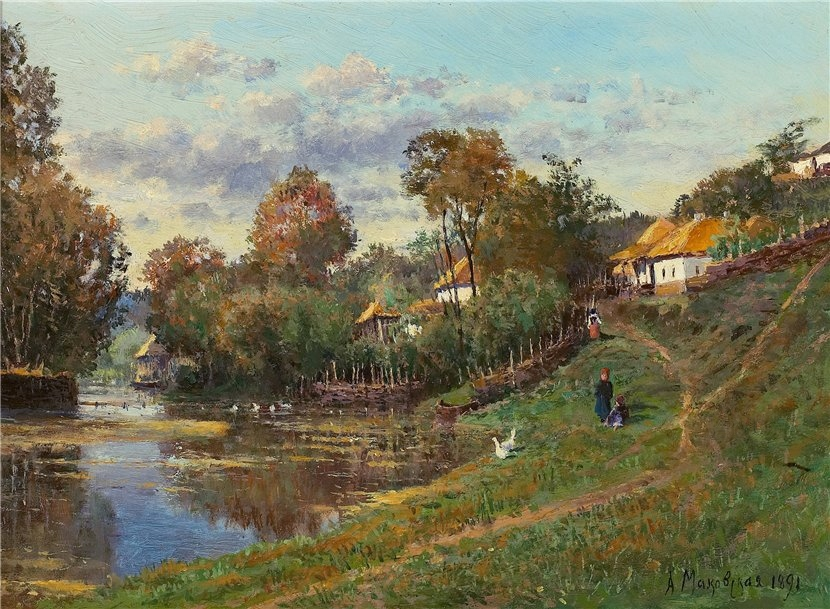
View of a Ukrainian Village, 1891

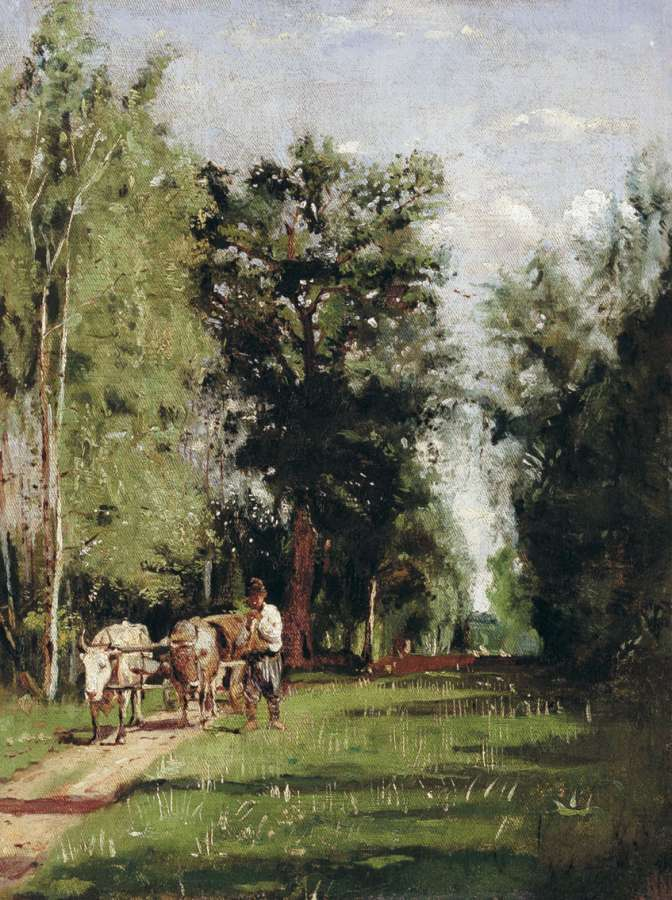
Landscape with a Peasant and His Telega, 1885

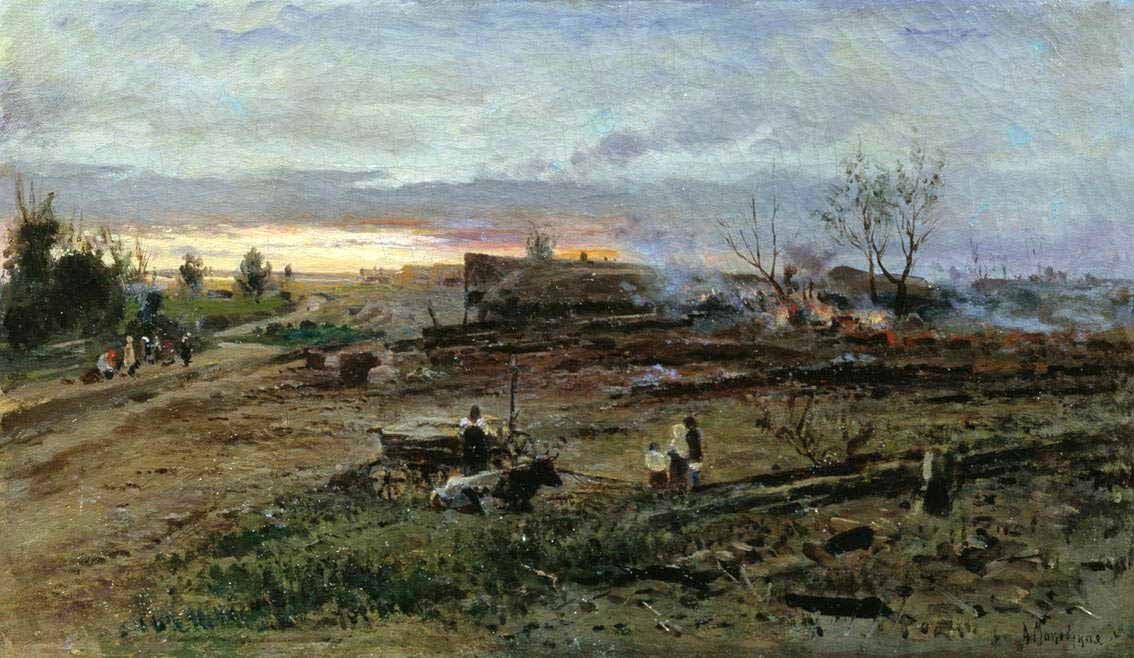
Fire in the Village
