= Vladimir Makovsky =

Russian painter (1846–1920)

- Владимир Маковский
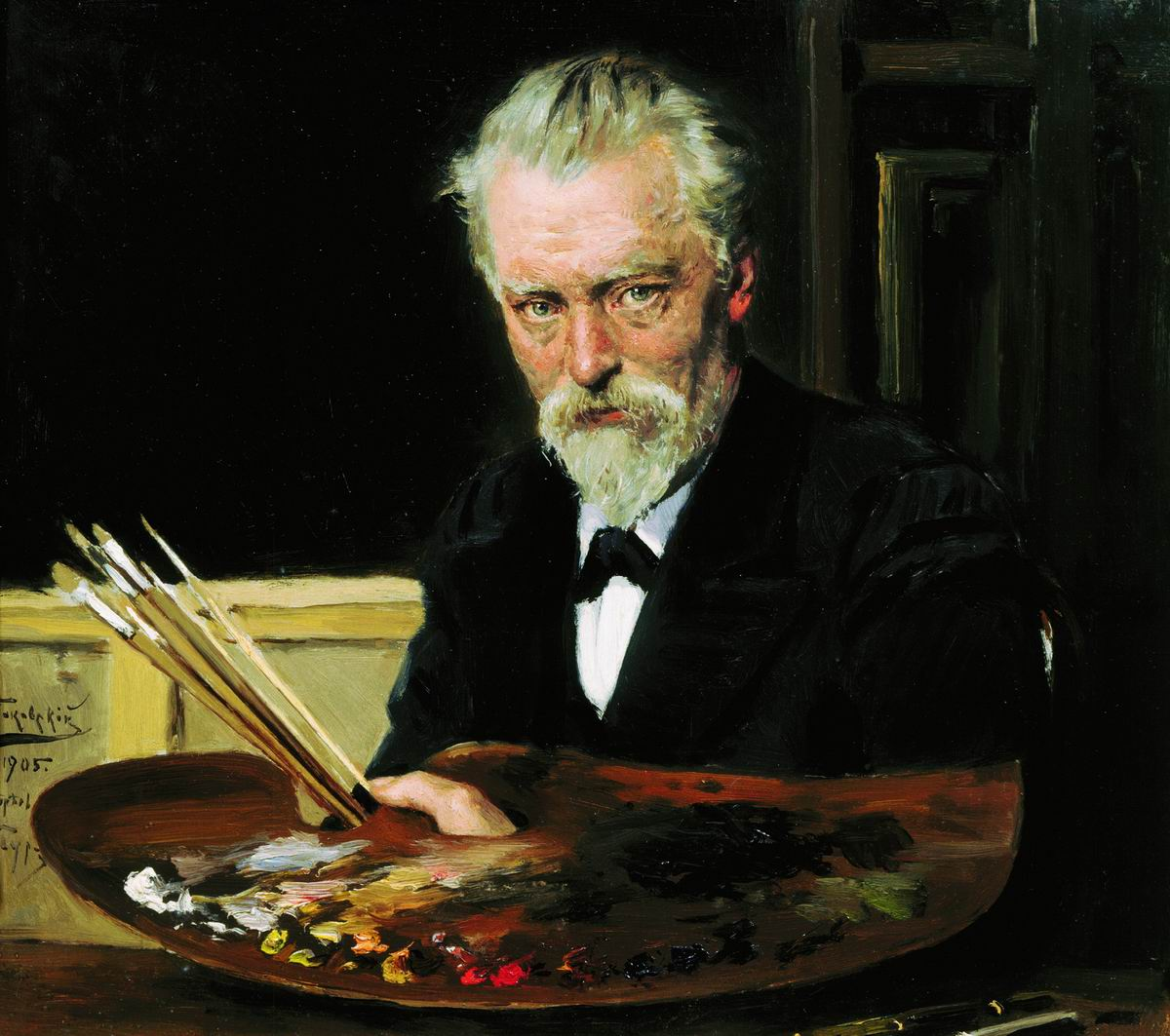
- Self-Portrait, 1905
- Born: 7 February [O.S. 26 January] 1846; Moscow, Russia
- Died: 21 February 1920 (aged 74); Petrograd, Russia
- Resting place: Smolensky Cemetery, Saint Petersburg
- Education: Member Academy of Arts (1873); Full Member Academy of Arts (1893); Professor by rank (1894)
- Alma mater: Moscow School of Painting, Sculpture and Architecture
- Known for: Painting
- Movement: Peredvizhniki

Vladimir Yegorovich Makovsky (Russian: Владимир Егорович Маковский; 7 February [O.S. 26 January] 1846 – 21 February 1920) was a Russian painter, art collector, and teacher.

== Biography ==
Makovsky was the son of collector, Egor Ivanovich Makovsky, who was one of the founders of the Moscow Art School. Vladimir had two brothers, Nikolay Makovsky and Konstantin Makovsky, and one sister, Alexandra Makovskaya, all of whom were famous painters. Vladimir studied at the Moscow School of Painting, Sculpture, and Architecture. He finished his studies in 1869 and the following year became one of the founding members of the Association of Travelling Art Exhibitions, where his many years of prolific work brought him to a leading position.

Makovsky's work was defined by a perpetual humor as well as blatant irony and scorn. During the seventies his paintings dealt primarily with small-town folk. His pictures, "The Grape-juice Seller" (1879), "Fruit-Preserving" (1876) and "The Congratulator" (1878) depict various scenes where the mood is finely conceived and almost laughter-inducing. Other works of his, such as "The Benefactor" (1874) and "The Convict" (1878) are profoundly socially conscious. In them, Makovsky either criticizes the false sympathy of the aristocracy towards the poor, or draws attention to the oppression and persecution by the tsarist gendarmerie. In 1878, he became an academician.

In the eighties, during the time of Russian "democratic" painting, Makovsky produced some of his most valued works. In 1882, he was made professor at the Moscow Art School after the death of Vasili Perov. Some of Makovsky's greatest works of this period include "In the Ante-room of the Court of Conciliation" (1880), "The Released Prisoner" (1882), and "The Collapse of the Bank" (1881). From the end of the 1880s, Makovsky began to produce more gloomy works. Quintessential works of this period include "You Shall Not Go" (1892), and "On the Boulevard" (1888).

In 1894, Makovsky became Rector of the Preparatory school of the Academy of Art. After the First Russian Revolution, he painted "January 9, 1905, on Vasilyev Island" in which he depicts the armed police firing at defenseless people. In another painting "The Sacrifices on the Khodyn Field" in which a thousand people lost their lives during the coronation ceremony in 1896 of Nicholas II, he again stood uncompromisingly on the side of the oppressed people. After the 1917 October Revolution, Makovsky helped carry over the realist traditions to the early stages of Socialist Realism.

== Selected paintings ==
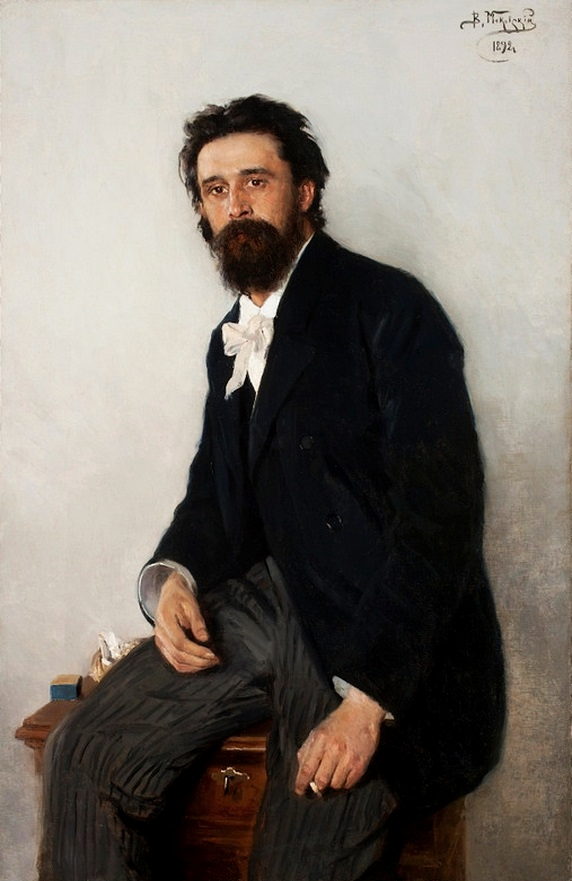
Portrait of painter Sergei Korovin (1892)

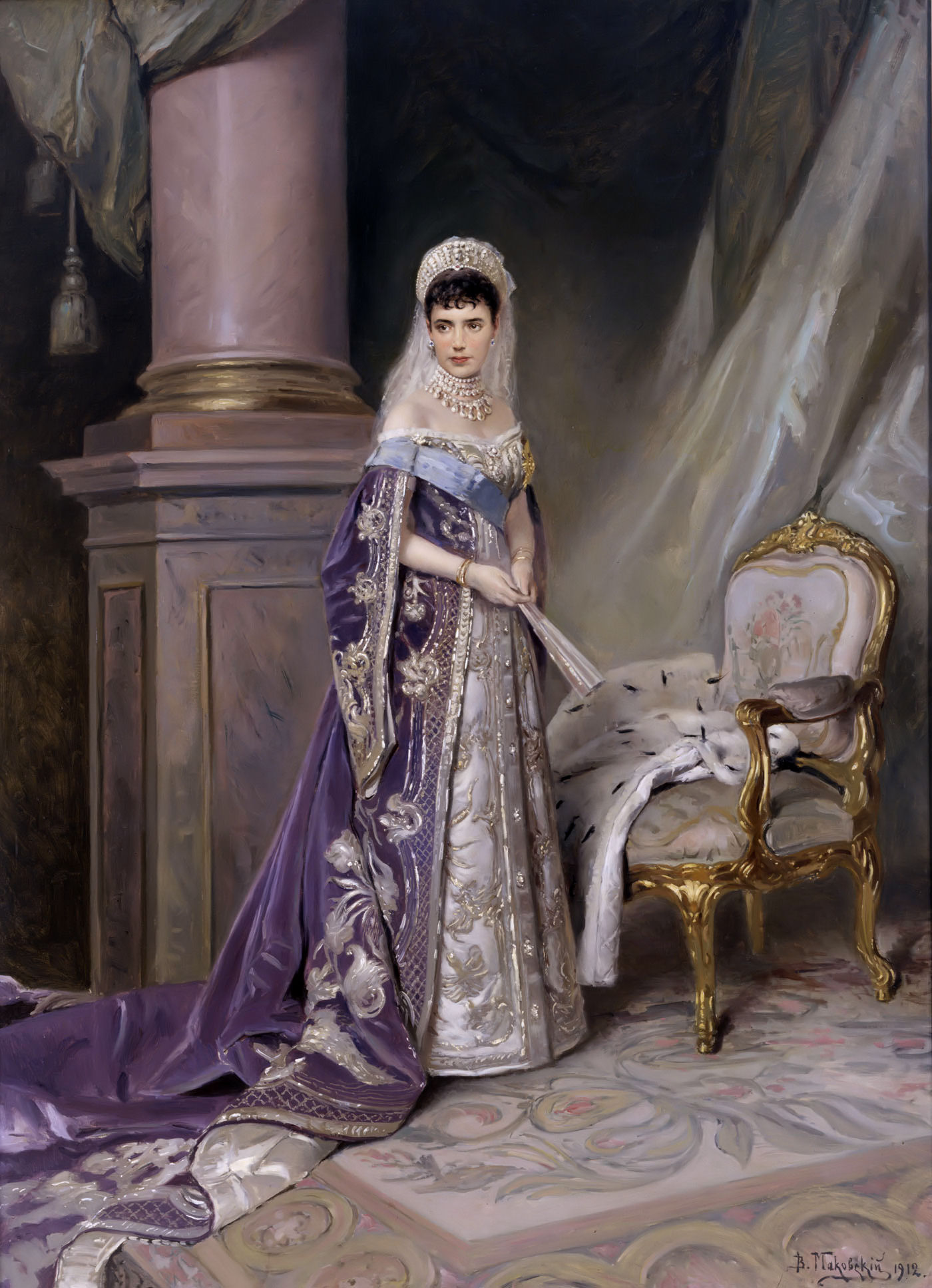
Portrait of Empress Maria Fyodorovna (1885)

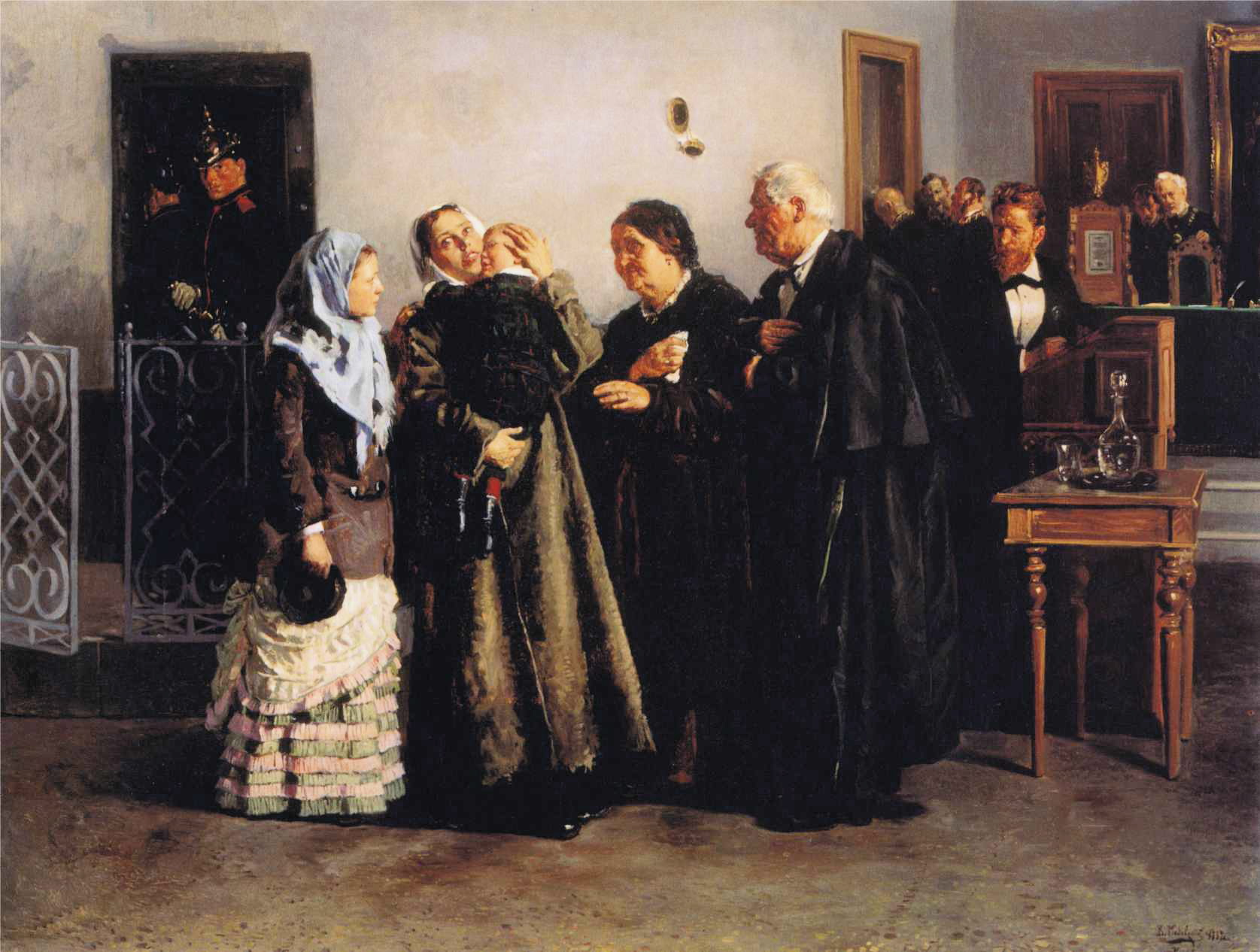
Not Guilty

Party

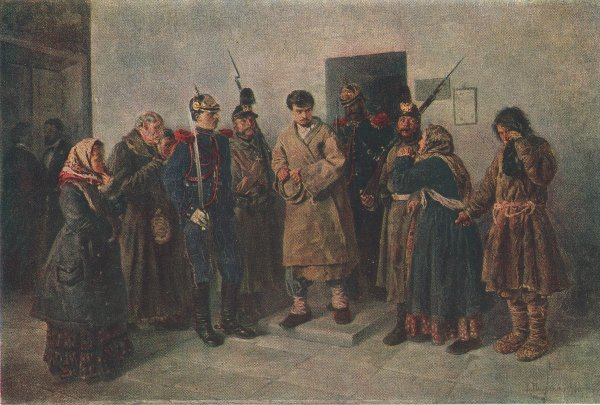
Convicted

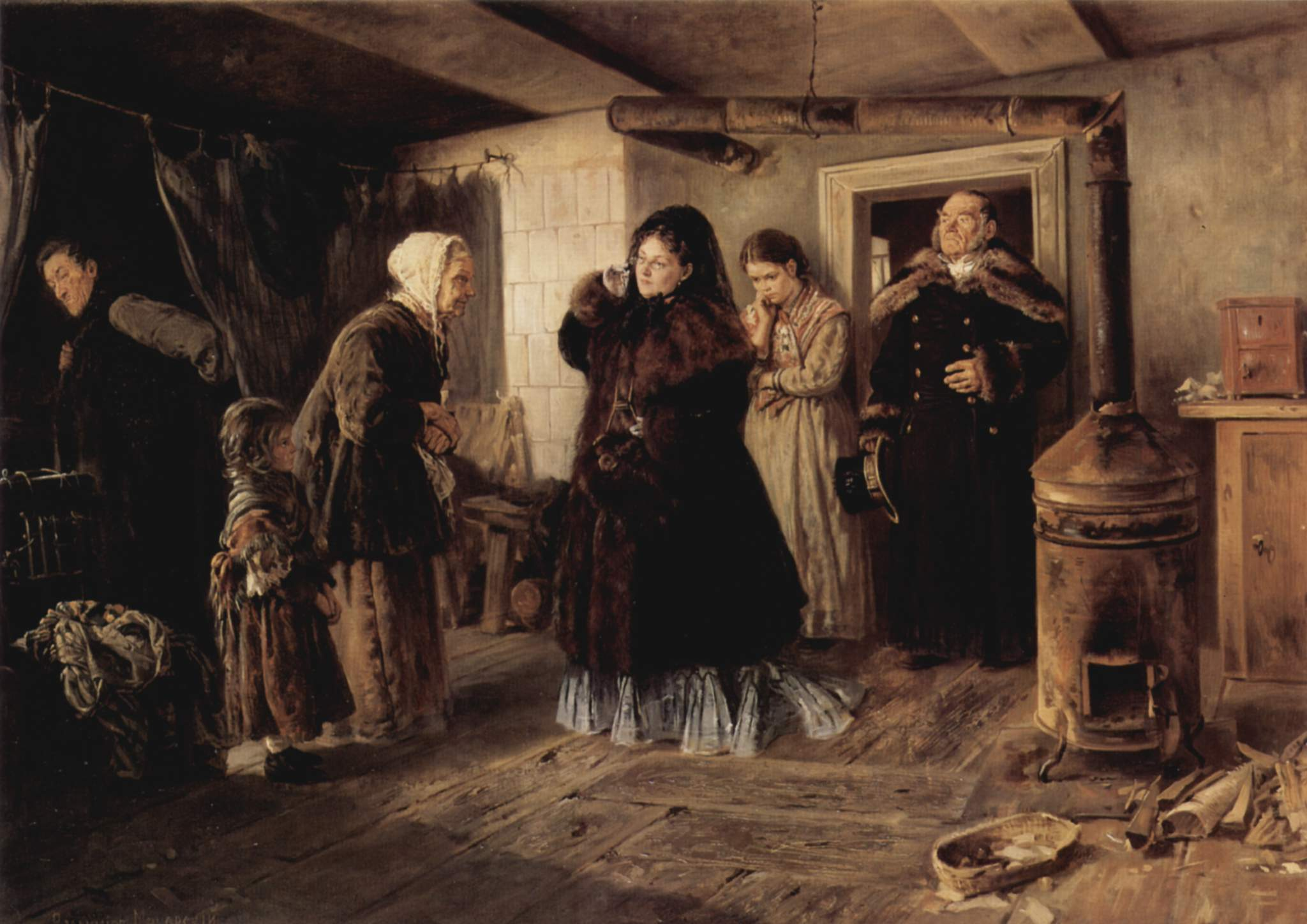
Philanthropists (1874)

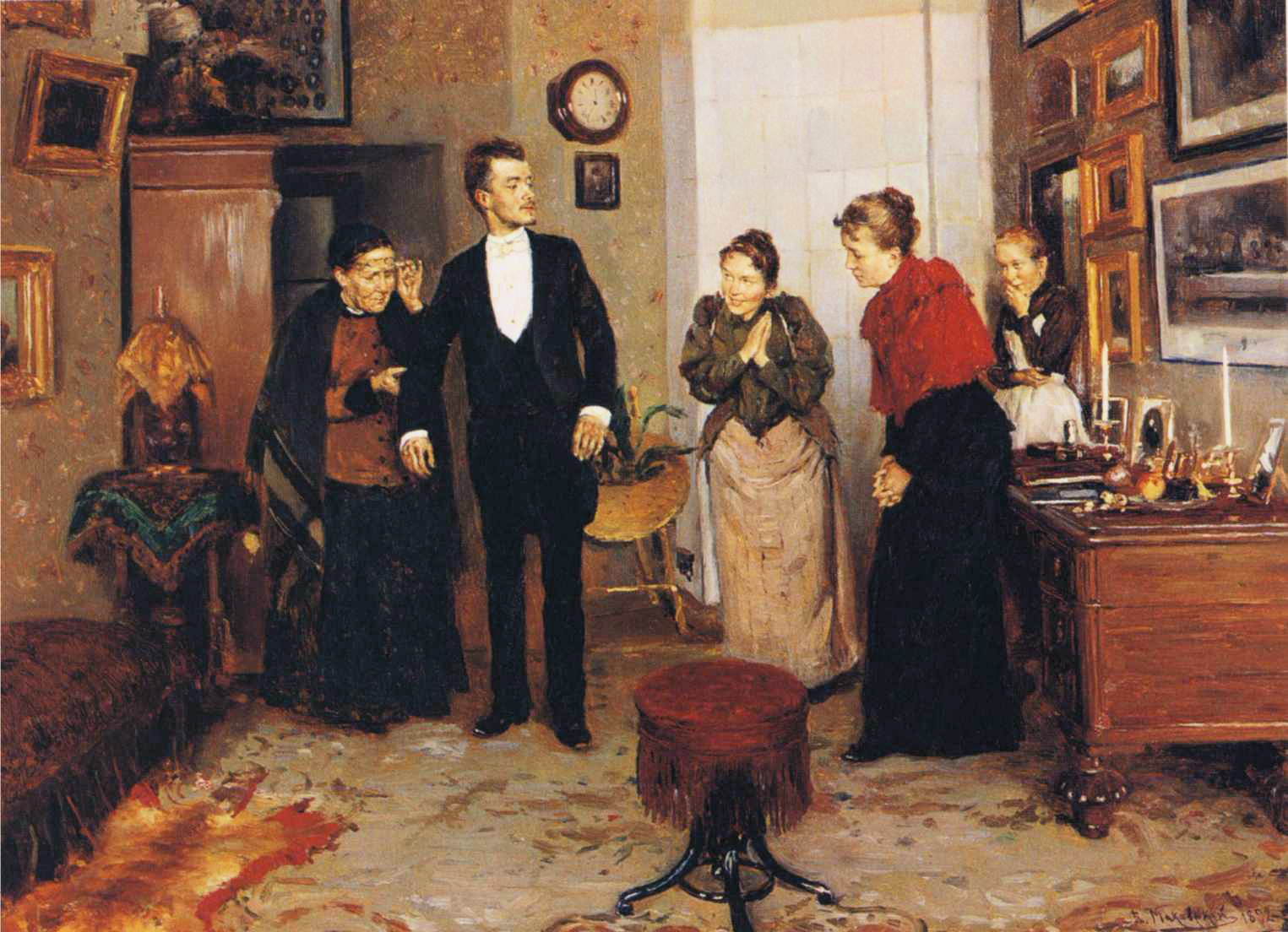
His First Suit

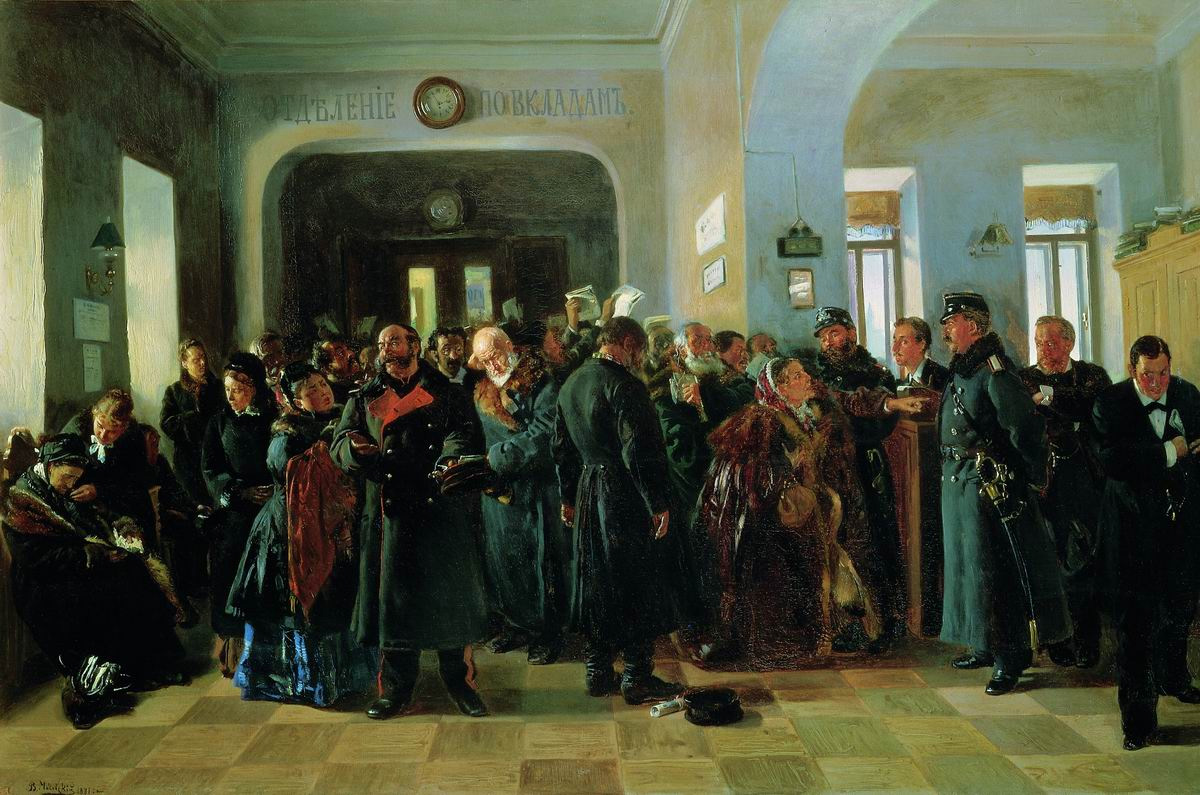
Bankruptcy

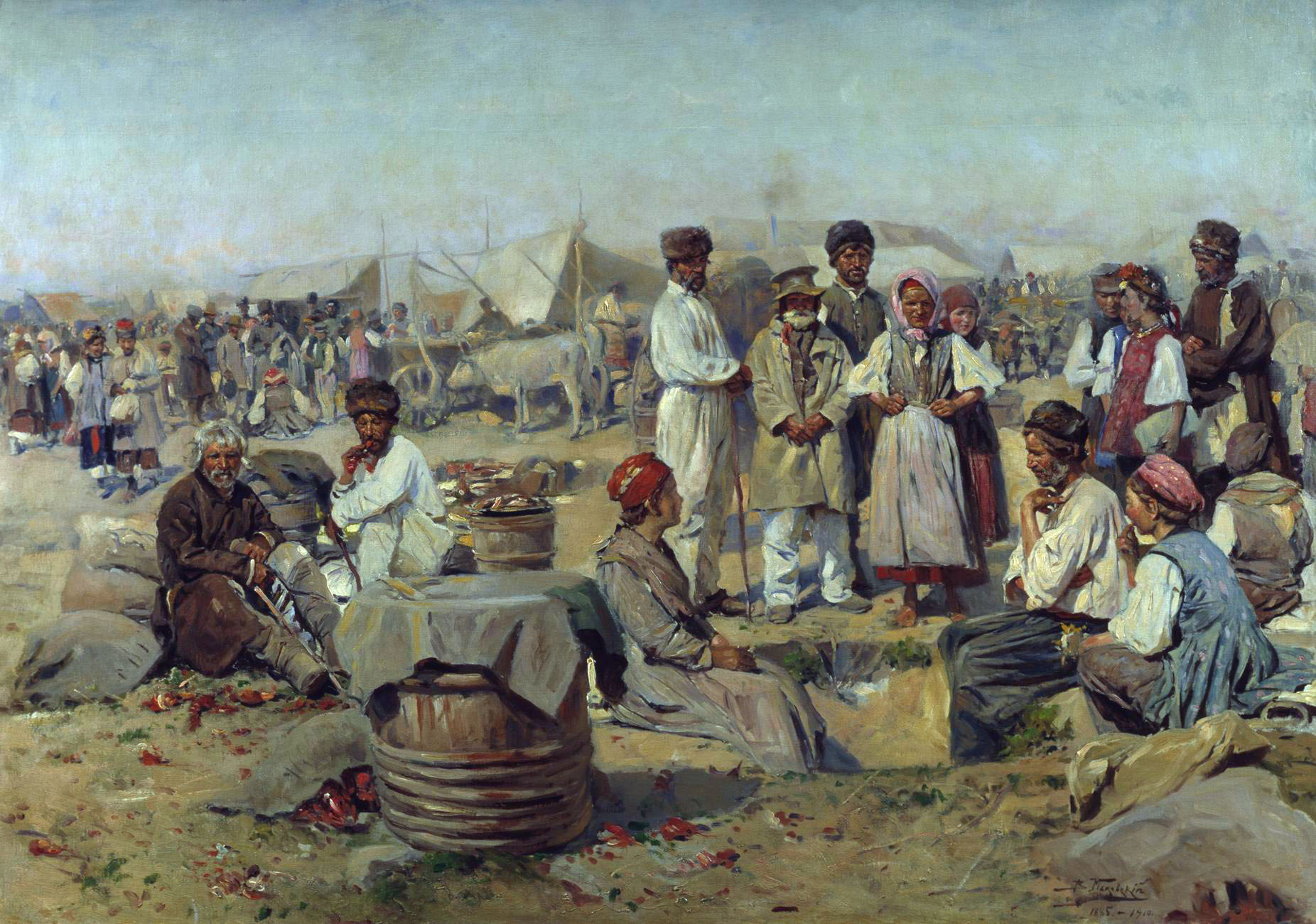
Market in Poltava

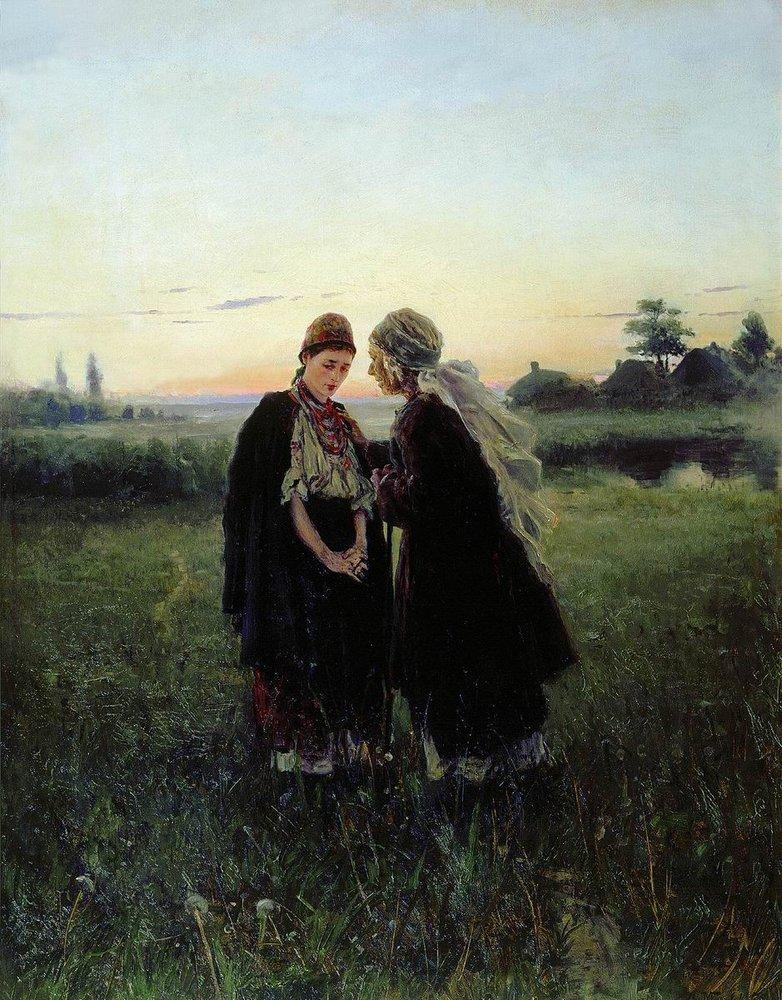
Mother and Daughter

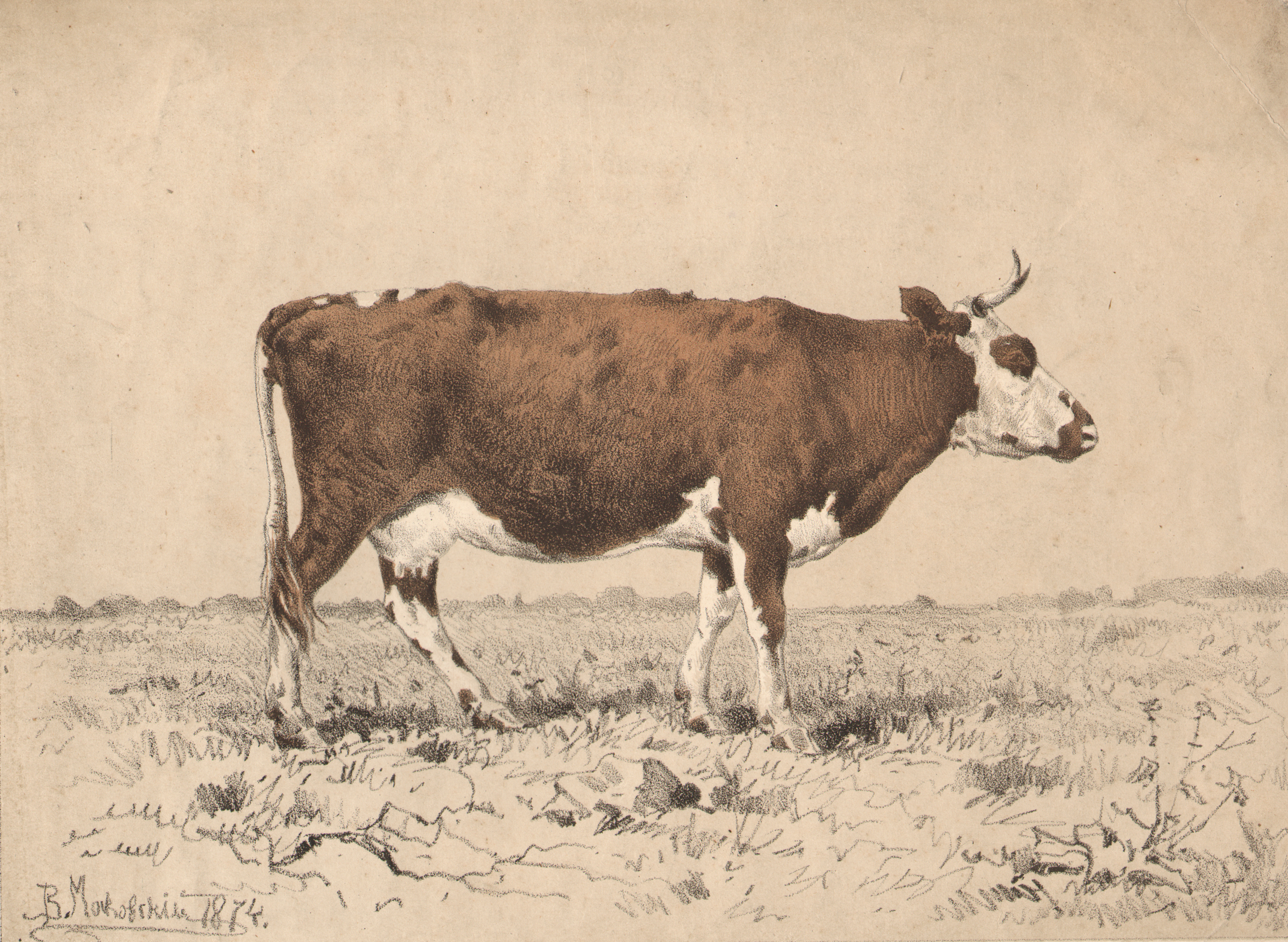
The cow (1874) lithography

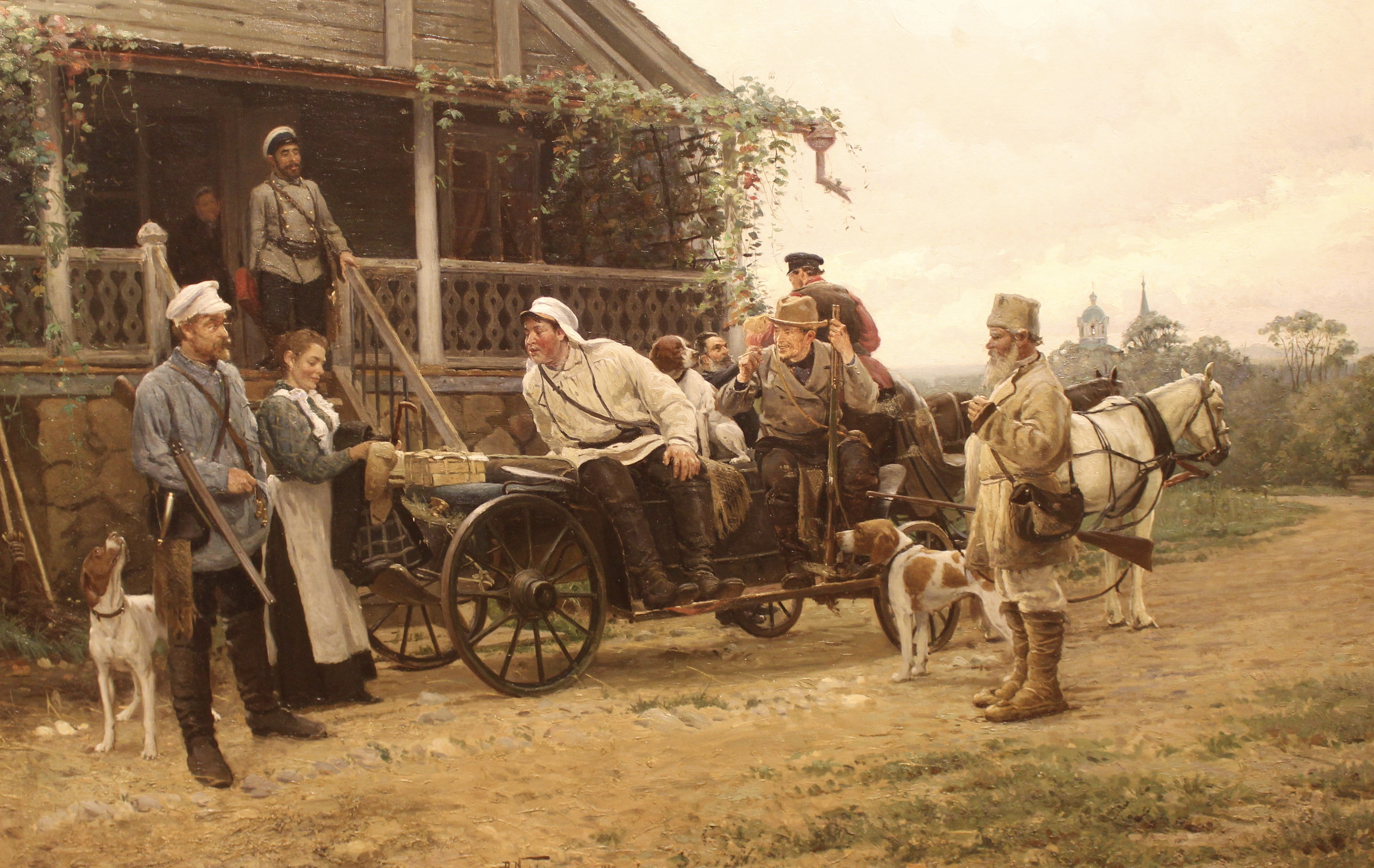
Departure for the Hunt (1899)

== Sources ==
- Vladimir Fiala, Russian Painting of the 18th and 19th Centuries, translated by Jean Layton, Artia, 1981
