= Nikolay Makovsky =

Russian painter (1841–1886)

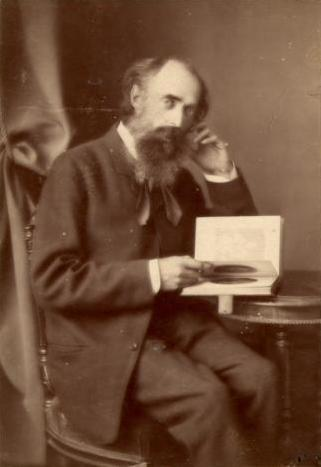
Nikolay Makovsky. Photograph by Andrei Karelin (date unknown)

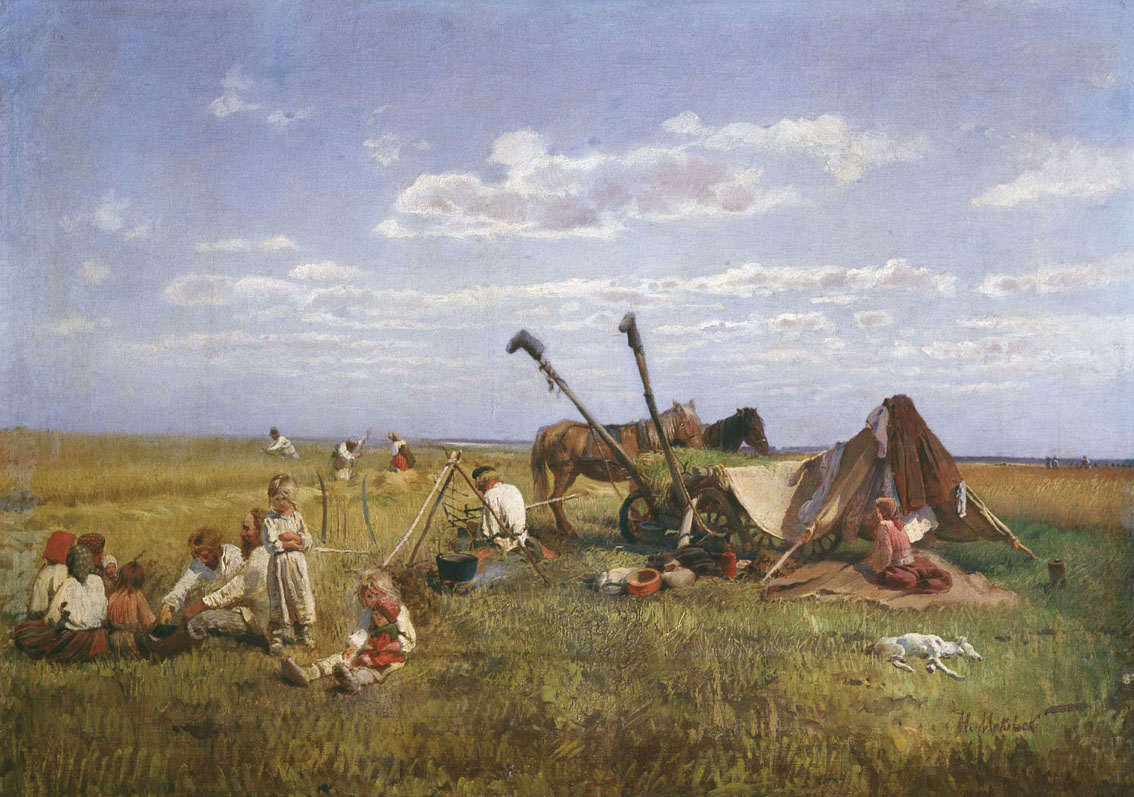
Resting at the Harvest

Nikolay Yegorovich Makovsky (Russian: Никола́й Его́рович Мако́вский; 10 May 1841, Moscow – 18 October 1886, Saint Petersburg) was a Russian painter; one of a quartet of artist siblings that included his brothers Konstantin and Vladimir and his sister Alexandra.

== Biography ==
His father, Yegor Ivanovich Makovsky, was an accountant by profession, but was also an amateur artist, avid art collector and one of the founders of the Moscow School of Painting, Sculpture and Architecture. He received his earliest education at the Moscow Palace Architecture School and attended the Imperial Academy of Arts from 1859 to 1866.

In 1865, he was awarded a silver medal for his work on a small stone church with 150 parishioners. Upon graduation, he was given the title of "Free Artist", which conferred the right to work on construction projects. Shortly thereafter, he became an architect's assistant at the Ministry of the Imperial Court, but eventually gave up his position there to devote all of his time to painting.

In 1870, he became one of the charter members of the "Association of Travelling Art Exhibitions" (Peredvizhniki), but didn't participate fully until 1875. In 1872, he was awarded the designation of "Artist Second-Degree" from the Academy.

From 1873 to 1874, he and his brother Konstantin toured Egypt, then he travelled extensively throughout Russia and Ukraine. He later spent several months at the Russian art colony in Paris, where he worked with Alexey Bogolyubov. From this point on, most of his paintings were shown in travelling exhibitions.
