= Egor Makovsky =

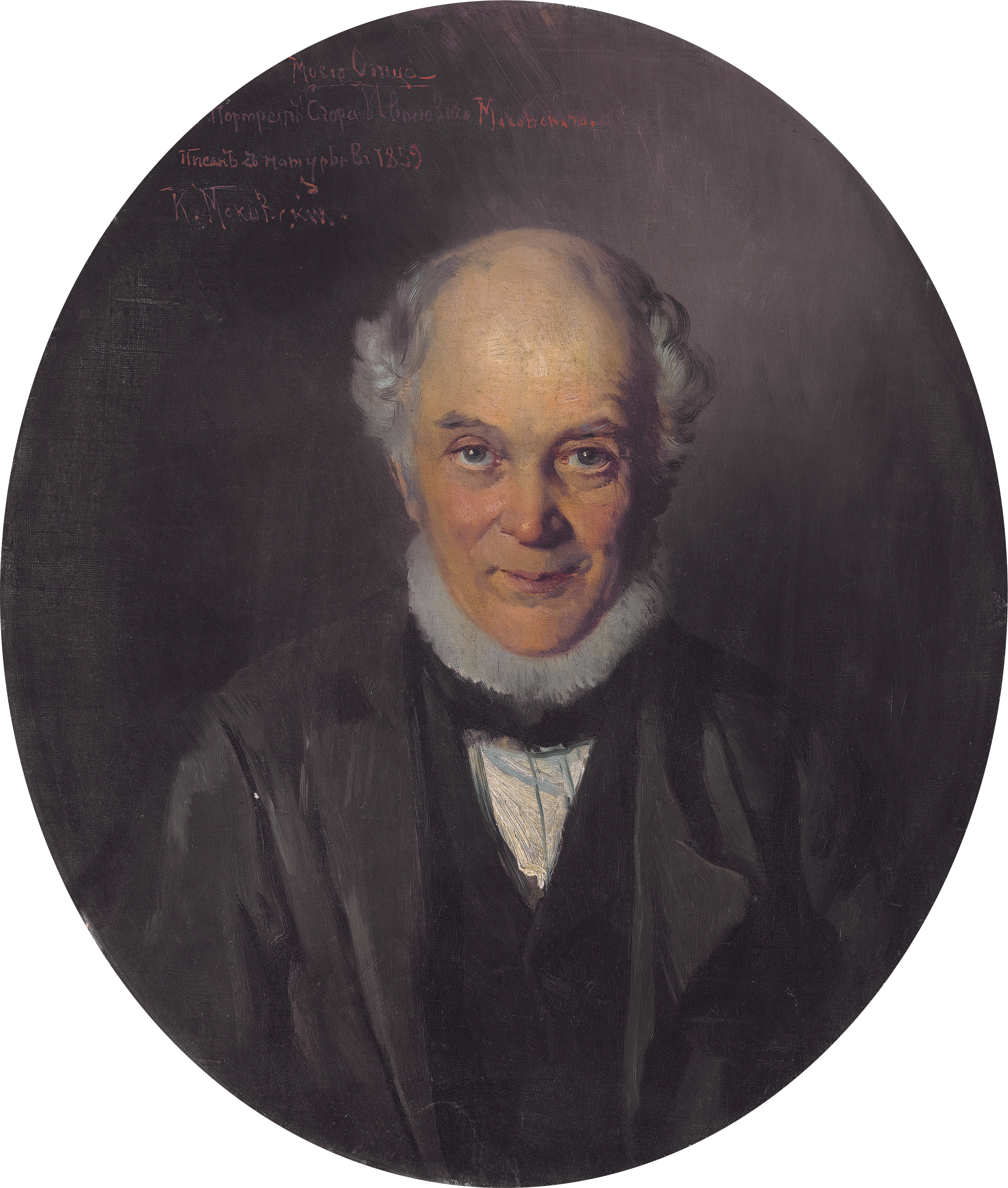
Makovsky, painted by his son Konstantin Makovsky in 1859

Egor Ivanovich Makovsky (14 April 1802 – 9 August 1886) was a Russian accountant and artist, one of the founders of the forerunner of the Moscow School of Painting, Sculpture and Architecture.

== Early life ==
Born in 1802 in Zvenigorod (although other sources say in 1800), Makovsky was the son of Ivan Borisovich Makovsky, a Russified Pole from Poland-Lithuania who served as a protocol officer in the Court of Noble Guardianship under D. A. Olsufiev. He grew up in Zvenigorod, until the age of eleven mostly in the house of his godfather Vasily Markovich Korotkov. In 1813, he was enrolled in the service of a Zvenigorod magistrate, but when the family moved to the Dankovsky District Makovsky found himself serving in the district court. While in Dankov, he took drawing lessons from an artist named Naumov. In 1818, he arrived in Moscow, where he spent the rest of his life. There, he became assistant to an accountant in the office of the Commission for the construction of the Cathedral of Christ the Saviour, a project still in its early stages, and also studied the art of the miniature under K. I. Zil.

== Career ==
In 1827, Makovsky was appointed as an accountant in the Office of the Kremlin Buildings, headed by Prince Nikolay Yusupov, and served there until old age.

While working as an accountant, Makovsky continued to work as an enthusiastic amateur painter of miniature portraits and also copied paintings kept in the Grand Kremlin Palace. He had inherited his father's collection of engravings and added to it. He also played the guitar, taking lessons from the guitarist I. V. Bogdanov.

Makovsky was a friend of the painters Karl Bryullov, Vasily Tropinin, Sergey Zaryanko, and Pyotr Sokolov, and the sculptor Ivan Vitali. In 1832, Makovsky and others founded a "Nature class", which by 1842 had become a private art school. In 1865, this was merged with the Palace School of Architecture, established in 1749 by Dmitry Ukhtomsky, to form the Moscow School of Painting, Sculpture and Architecture.

Makovsky died in his apartment in Moscow in 1886 and was buried at the Vagankovo Cemetery.

== Wife and children ==
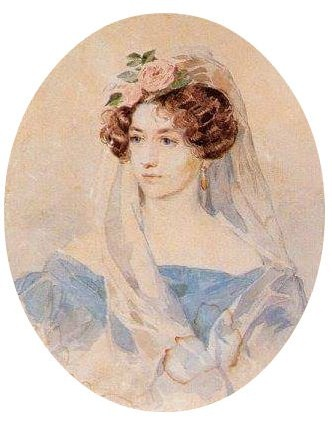
Lubov Mollengauer, c. 1820

In 1835, Makovsky married Lubov Kornilovna Mollengauer (1800–1893), a notable Moscow beauty, daughter of Cornelius Mollengauer, a German merchant originally from Königsberg who made musical instruments. She was a talented singer and sang as a soprano in concerts. After her marriage, she sang at musical evenings at home. Portraits of her were painted by Bryullov and Tropinin. However, the marriage ended in divorce. In 1866 she was appointed as a singing teacher by Nikolai Rubinstein when the Moscow Conservatory was established

The Makovskys had five children: Maria (born 1836); Alexandra (1837–1915), a landscape painter; Konstantin (1839–1915), a painter; Nikolai (1841–1886), a painter; Vladimir (1846–1920), a painter and graphic artist.
