= Konstantin Makovsky =

Russian painter (1839–1915)

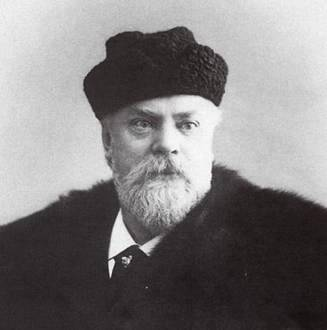
- Makovsky, 1900s
- Born: Konstantin Yegorovich Makovsky; 20 June 1839; Moscow, Moskovsky Uyezd, Moscow Governorate, Russian Empire
- Died: 17 September 1915 (aged 76); Petrograd, Russian Empire
- Resting place: Nikolskoe Cemetery, St. Petersburg (lost)
- Education: Moscow School of Painting, Sculpture and Architecture; Imperial Academy of Arts
- Known for: Painting
- Movement: Peredvizhniki, Academism
- Awards: Member Academy of Arts (1867); Full Member Academy of Arts (1898)
- Patrons: Alexander II of Russia

Konstantin Yegorovich Makovsky (Russian: Константи́н Его́рович Мако́вский; (20 June o.c.) 2 July n.c. 1839 – 17 o.c. (30 n.c.) September 1915) was a Russian painter during the Belle Époque, affiliated with the "Peredvizhniki (Wanderers)". Many of his historical paintings, such as Beneath the Crown (1889) also known as The Russian Bride's Attire and Before the Wedding, showed an idealized view of Russian life of prior centuries. He is often considered a representative of Academic art.

== Biography ==
Konstantin Makovsky (1839–1915) was a famous Russian realist painter who opposed academic restrictions that existed in the art world at the time. His father was the Russian art figure and amateur painter, Egor Makovsky and his mother was a composer. Because of his parents' professions, Makovsky showed an early interest in painting and music. He entered the Moscow School of Painting, Sculpture and Architecture at the age of 12, where he was influenced by teachers such as Vasily Tropinin and Karl Bryullov. After graduating, Makovsky went to France in hopes of becoming a composer, but after touring Europe in order to get acquainted with traditional folk and classical music, he ultimately chose painting.

In 1858 Makovsky entered the Imperial Academy of Arts in Saint Petersburg, where he created artworks such as Curing of the Blind (1860) and Agents of the False Dmitry kill the son of Boris Godunov (1862). In 1863, Makovsky and thirteen other students protested against the Academy's decision to only allow artwork of Scandinavian mythology in the competition for the Large Gold Medal of Academia. Thus, all of them left the academy without a diploma. This incident later came to be known as the "Revolt of the Fourteen".

Later, Makovsky joined the Artel of Artists, a cooperative association founded by Ivan Kramskoi, whose members were realist artists that advocated for more realistic depictions of the everyday life of old Russia. Notable works by Makovsky of this period are "The Widow" (1865) and "The Herringwoman" (1867). In 1870 he became a founding member of the Society for Travelling Art Exhibitions and continued to work on paintings in the realism genre. He went on to travel North Africa and Serbia in the mid-1870s., which resulted in a significant stylistic change as he started putting greater emphasis on colours and shapes.

At the World's Fair of 1889 in Paris, he received the Large Gold Medal for his paintings Death of Ivan the Terrible, The Judgement of Paris, and Demon and Tamara. By the end of the century, Makovsky was one of the most respected and highly-paid Russian artists, regarded by some critics as the forerunner of Russian impressionism. He died in 1915 when his crew crashed into a tram on the streets of St. Petersburg.

== Artist's style ==
The artist's painterly style has the features of several styles. Having left school and being a representative of academism, he demonstrated some of the qualities which would be most clearly shown in the work of the Russian Impressionists. In addition, some of his historical paintings, such as Bride-show (1889), show an idealised view of life in Russia in previous eras.

== Artworks ==
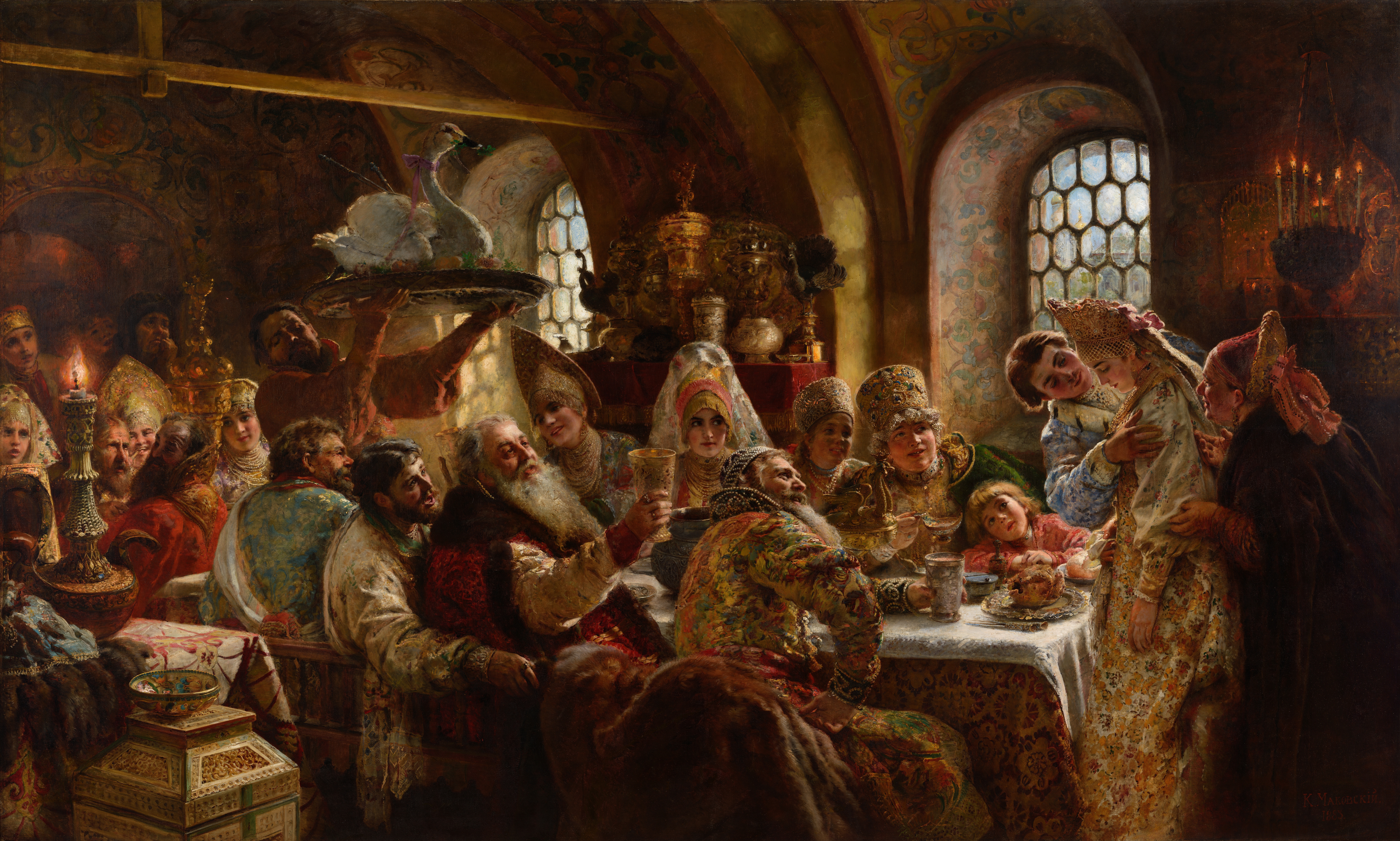
A Boyar Wedding Feast

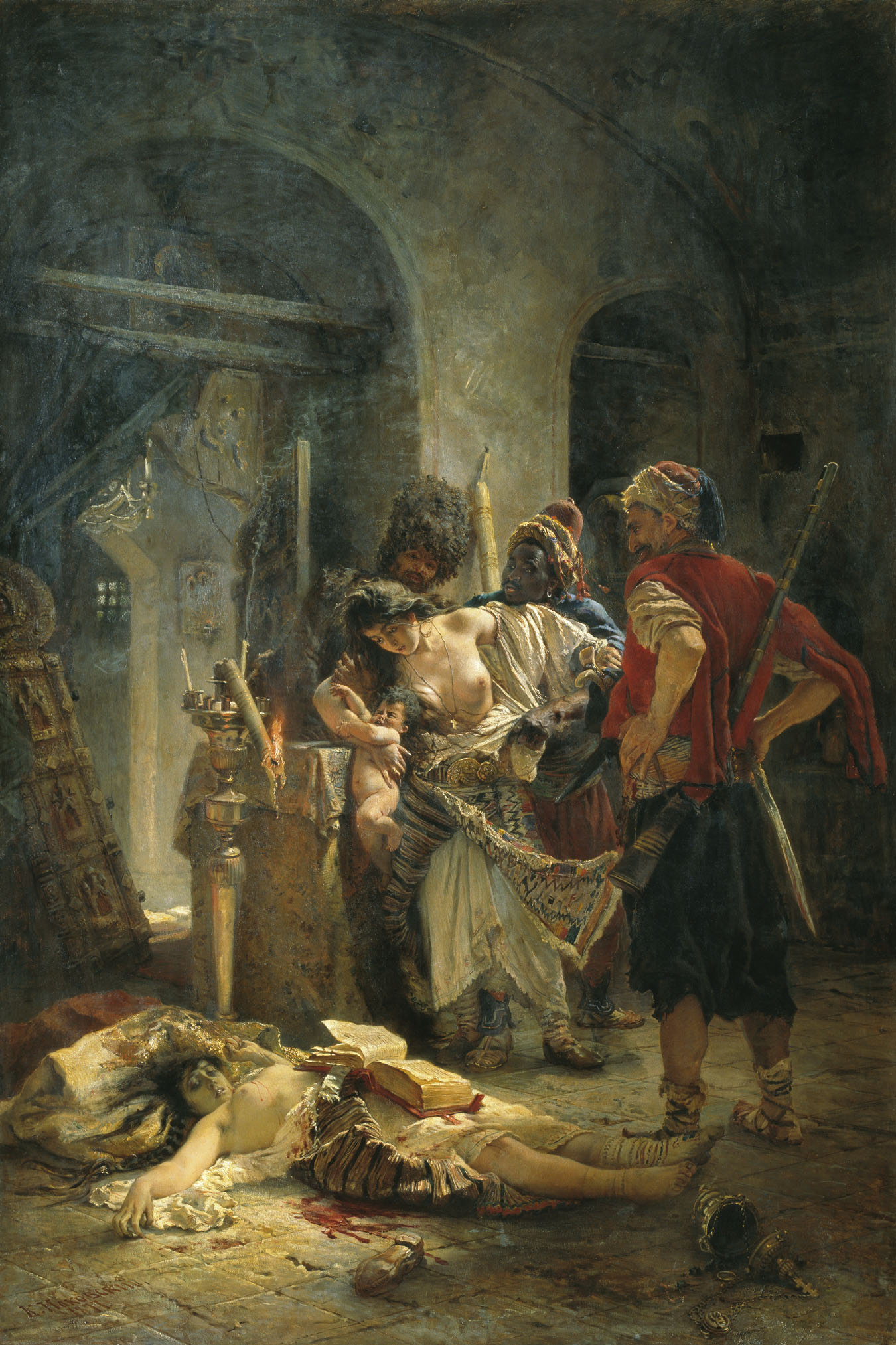
The Bulgarian martyresses

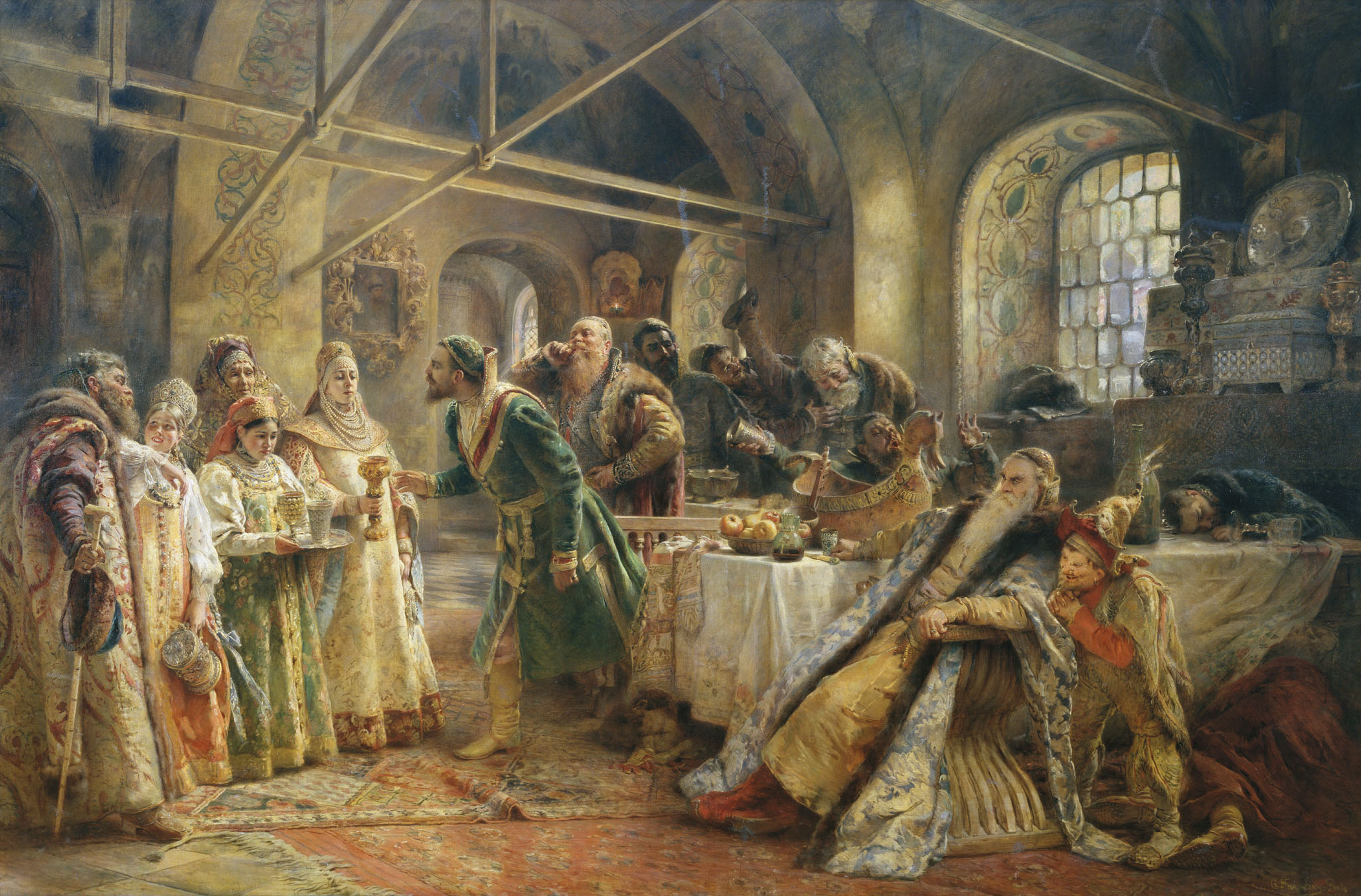
Kissing Ceremony

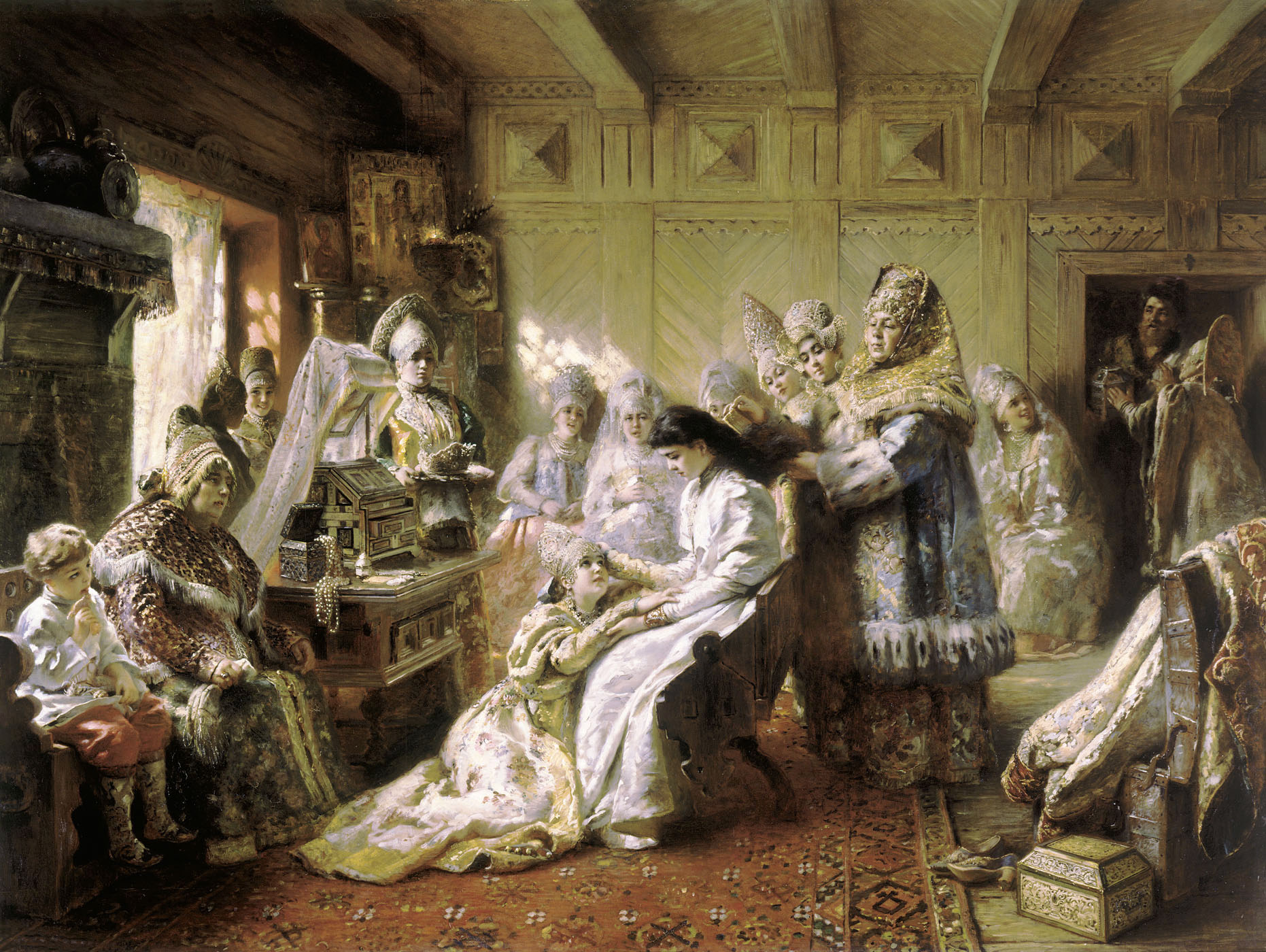
Beneath the Crown/The Russian Bride's Attire/Before the Wedding

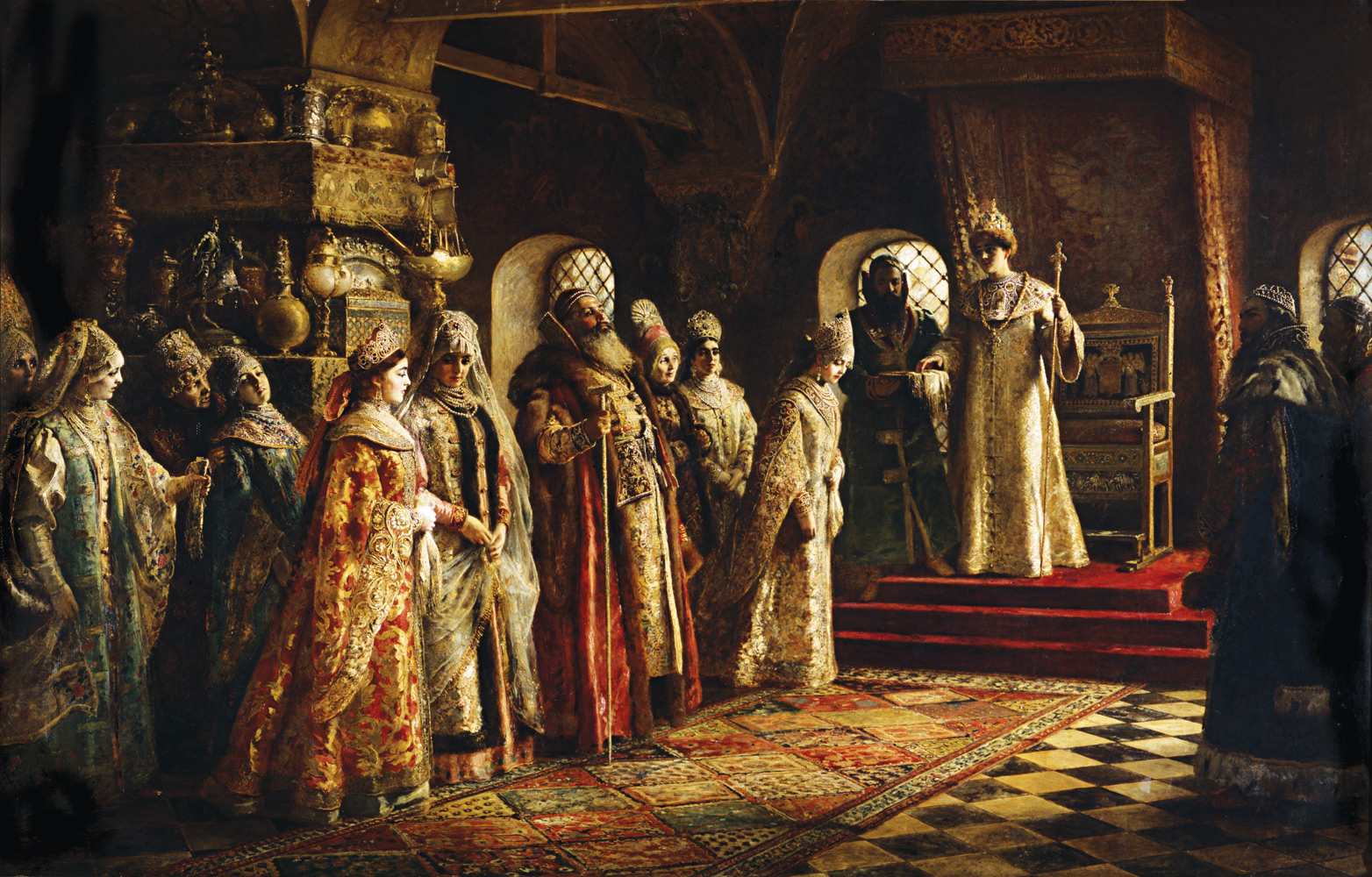
Bride-show

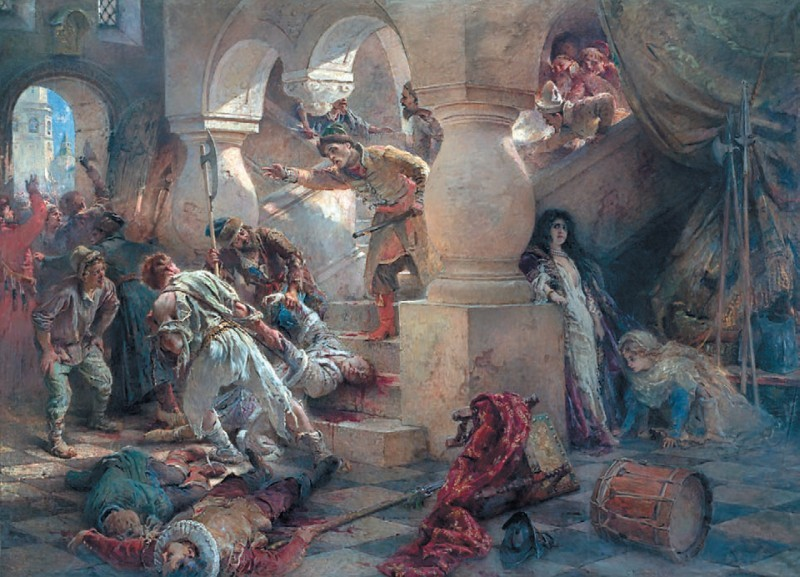
The Murder of False Dmitry

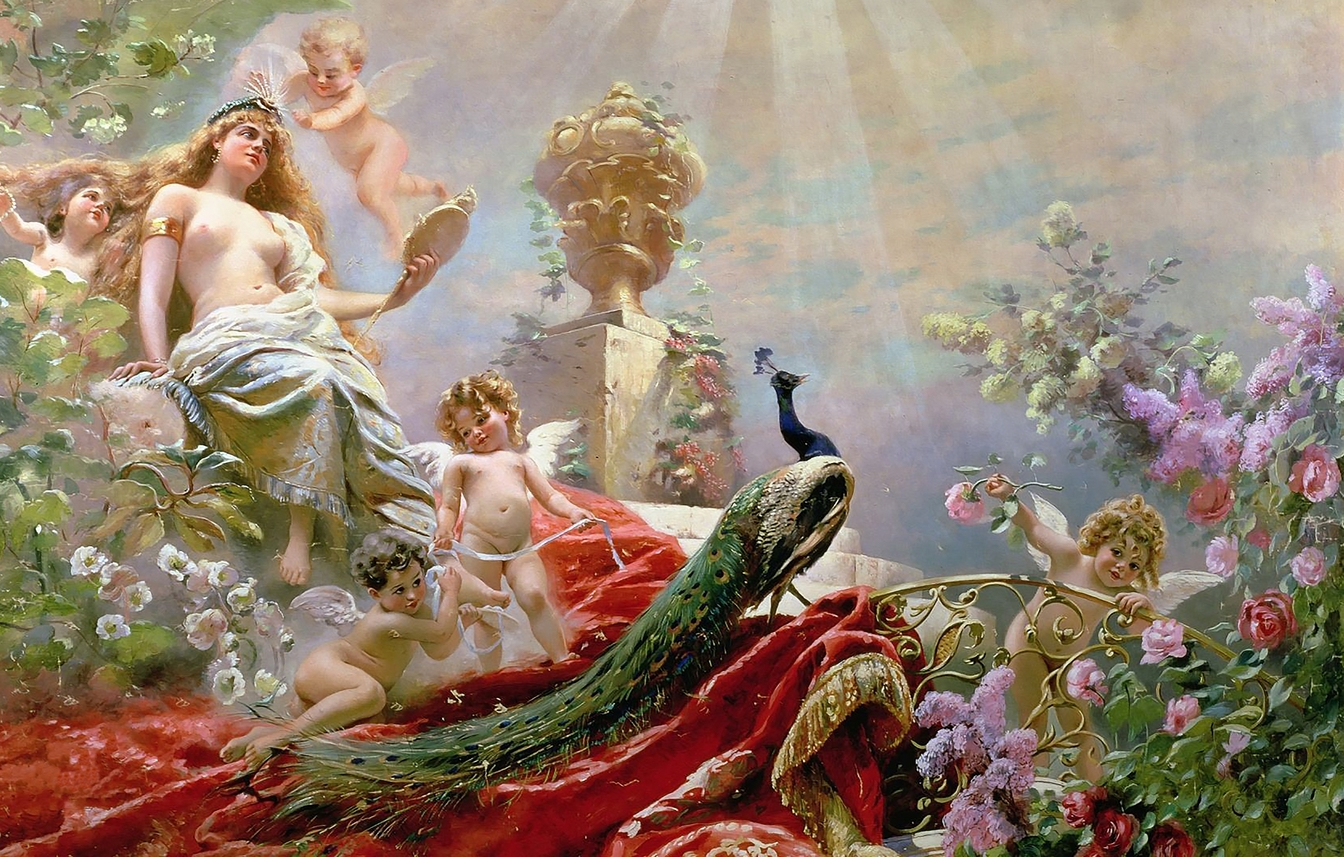
The Toilet of Venus

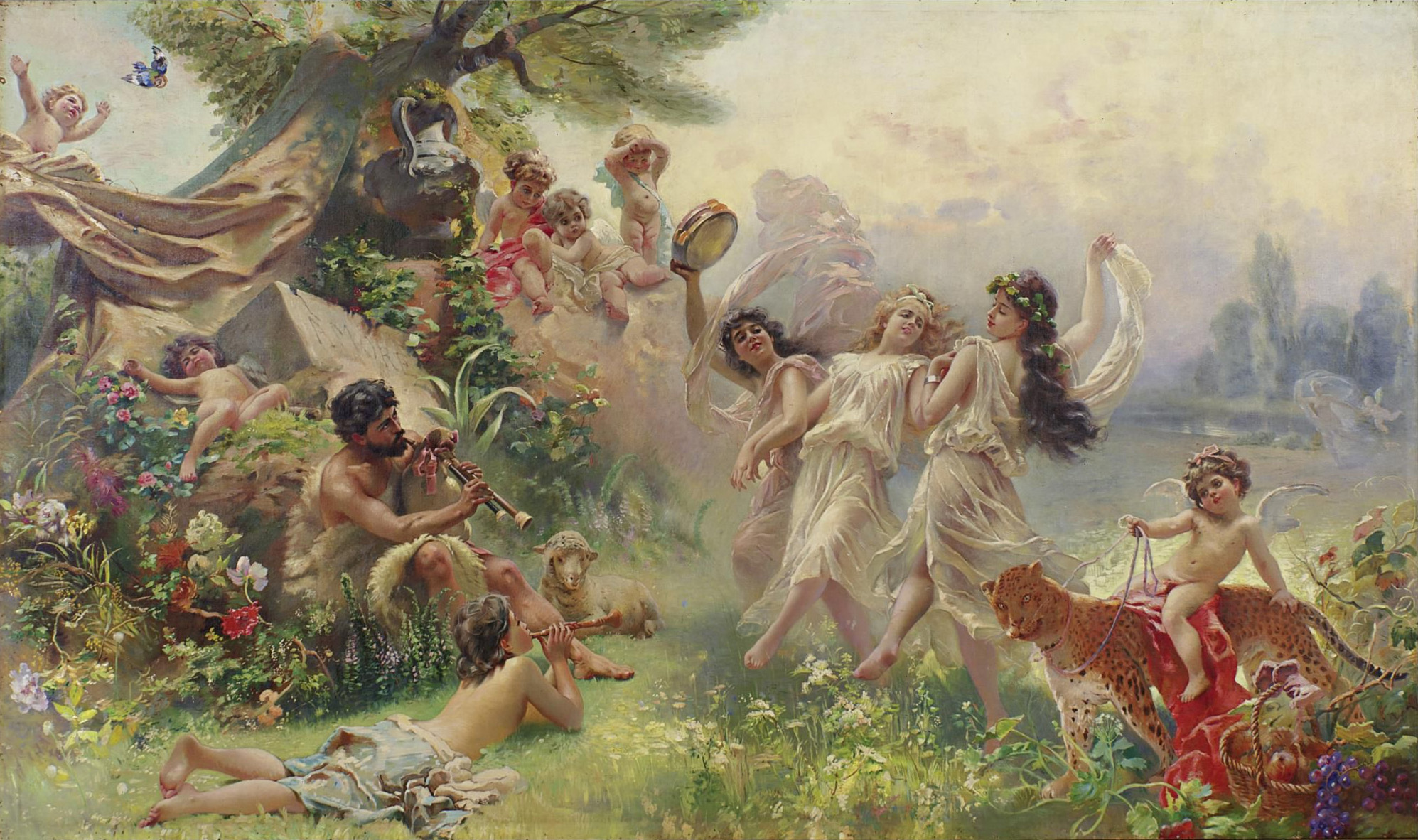
Happy Arcadia

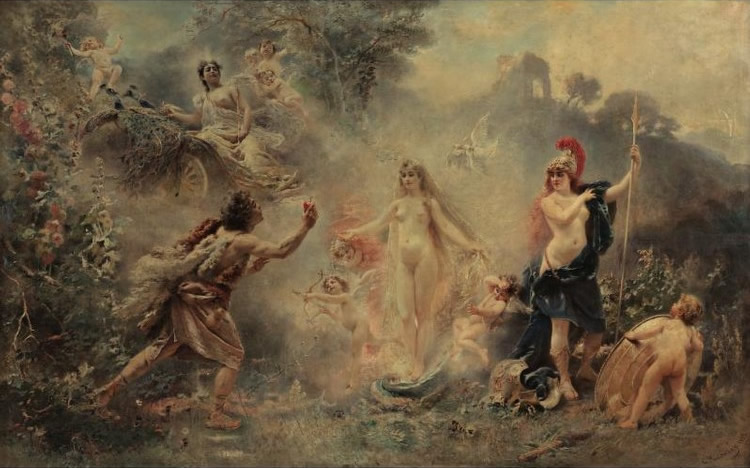
The Judgement of Paris

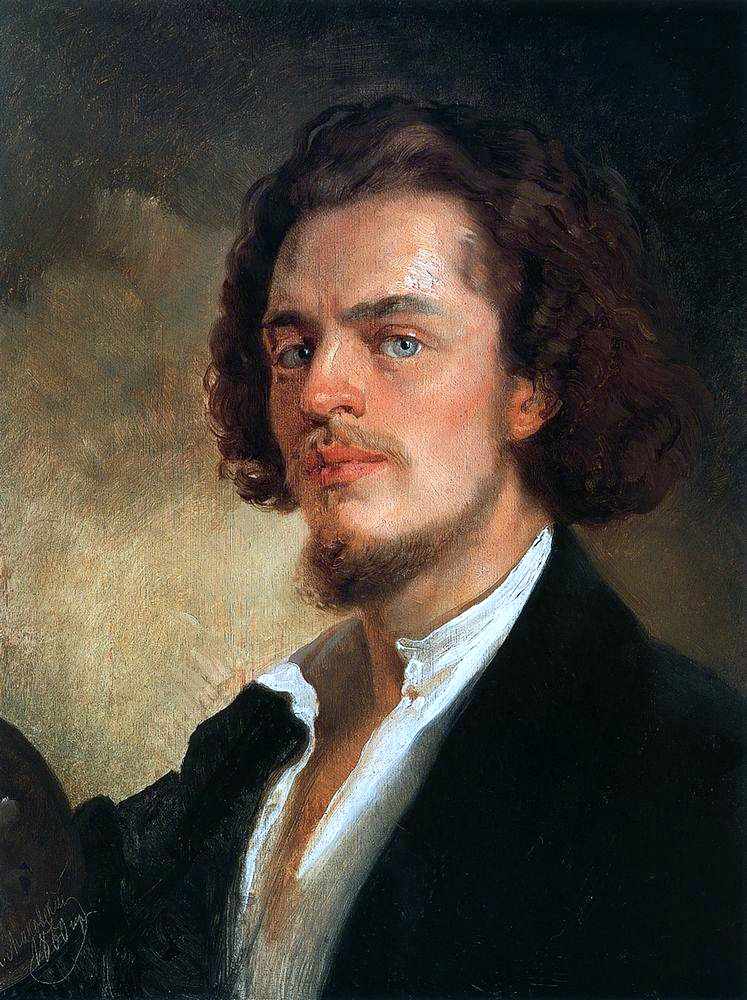
Self-Portrait, c. 1856

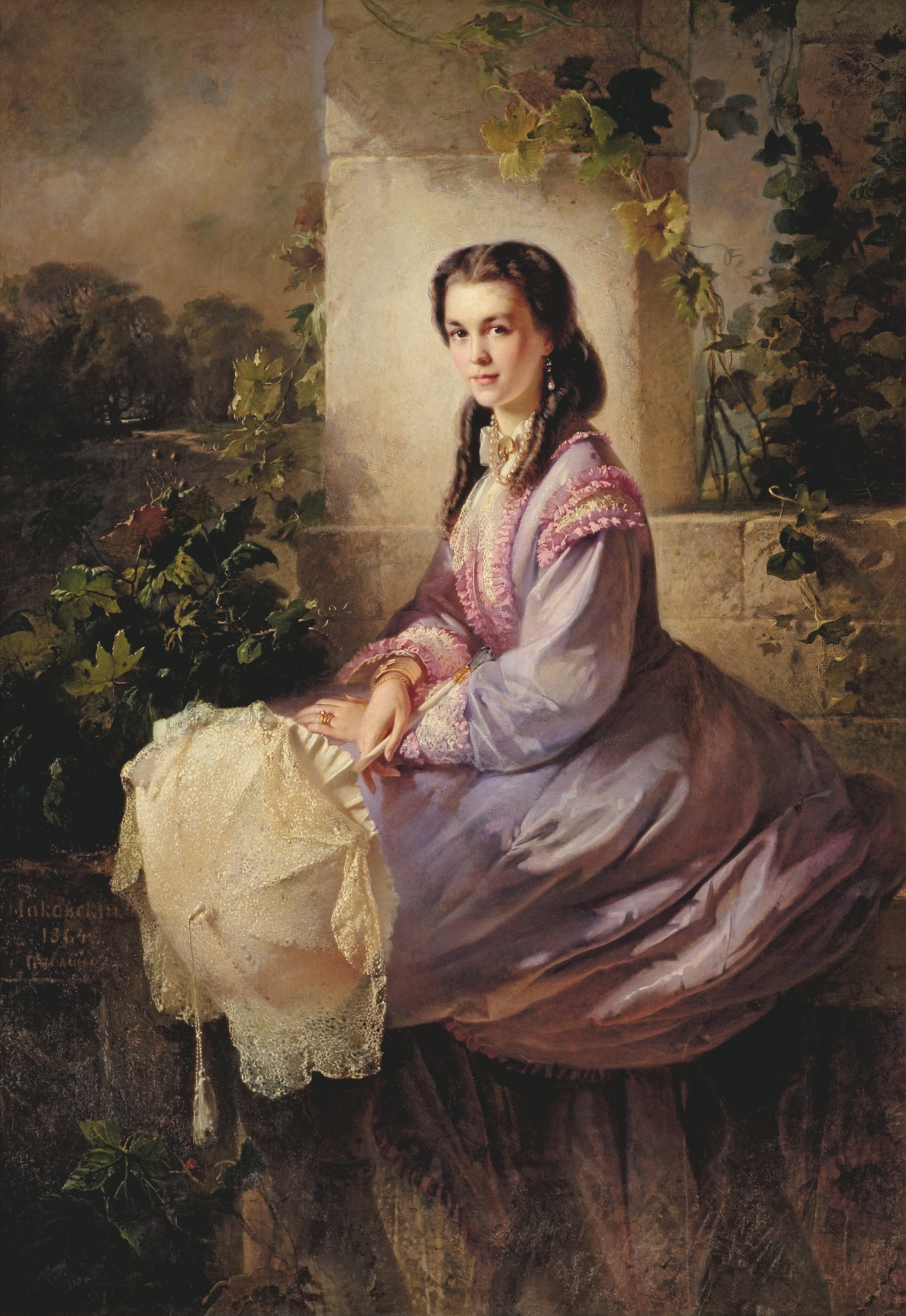
Portrait of S. L. Stroganova

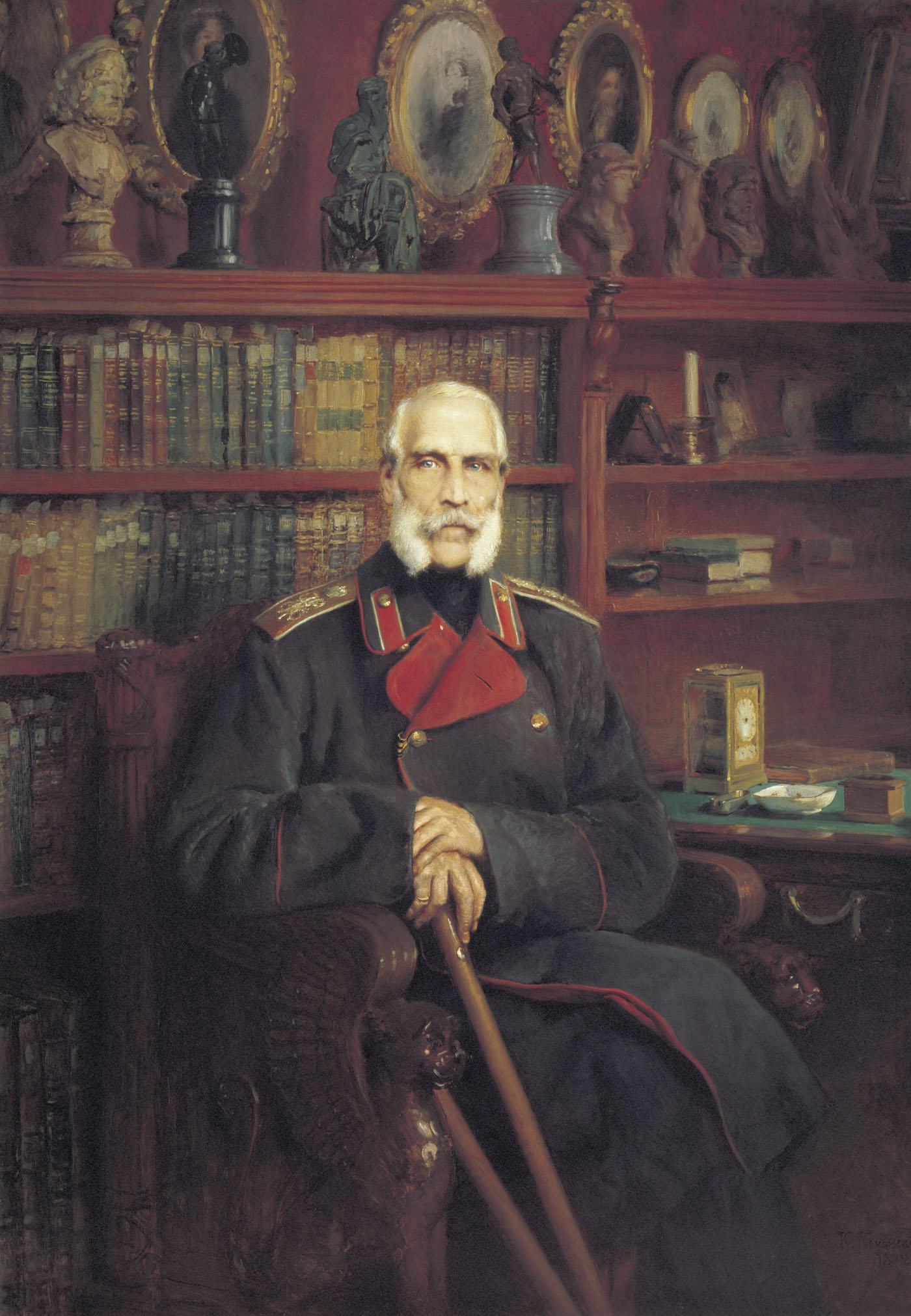
Portrait of Sergei Stroganov

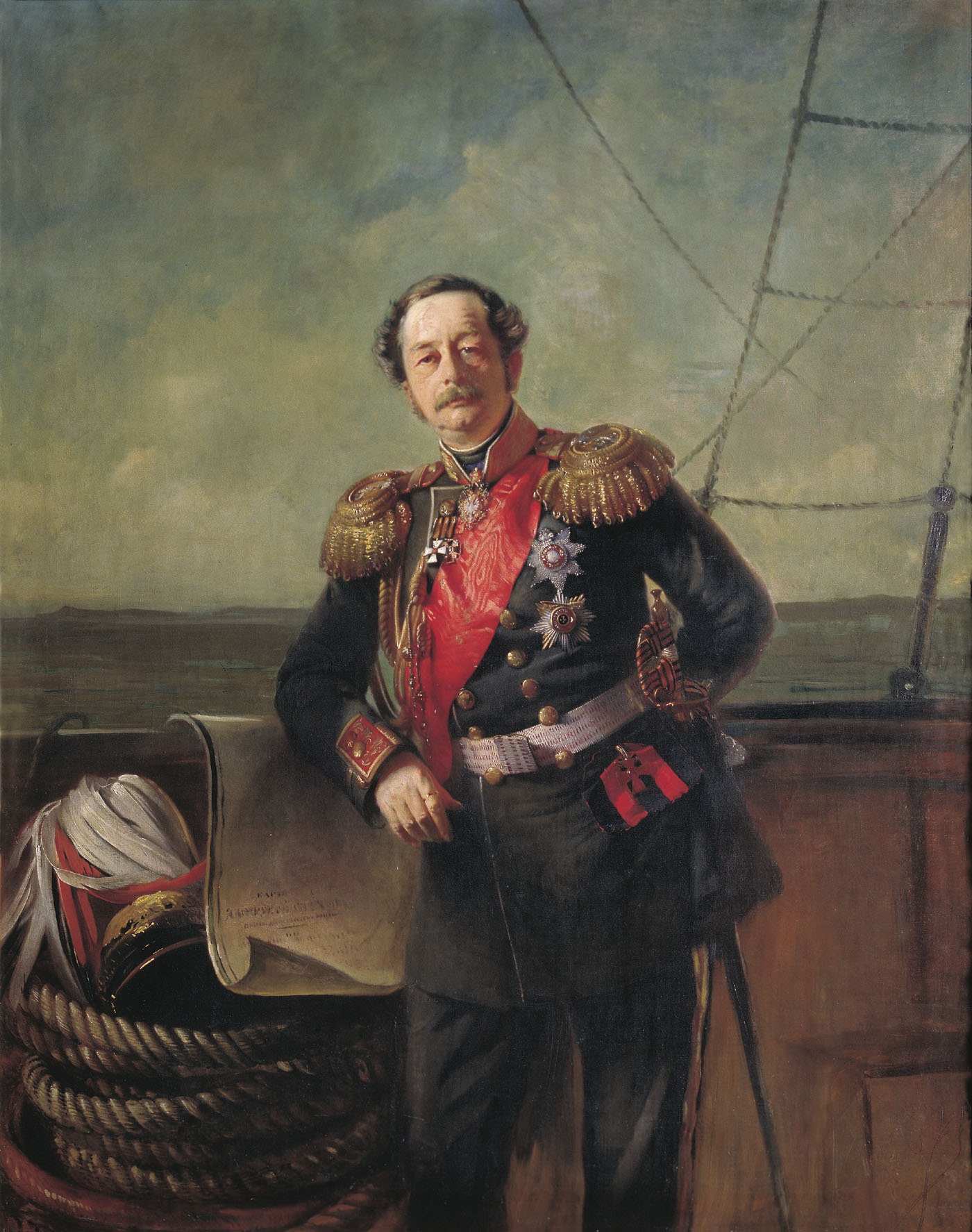
Portrait of Muraviev-Amursky

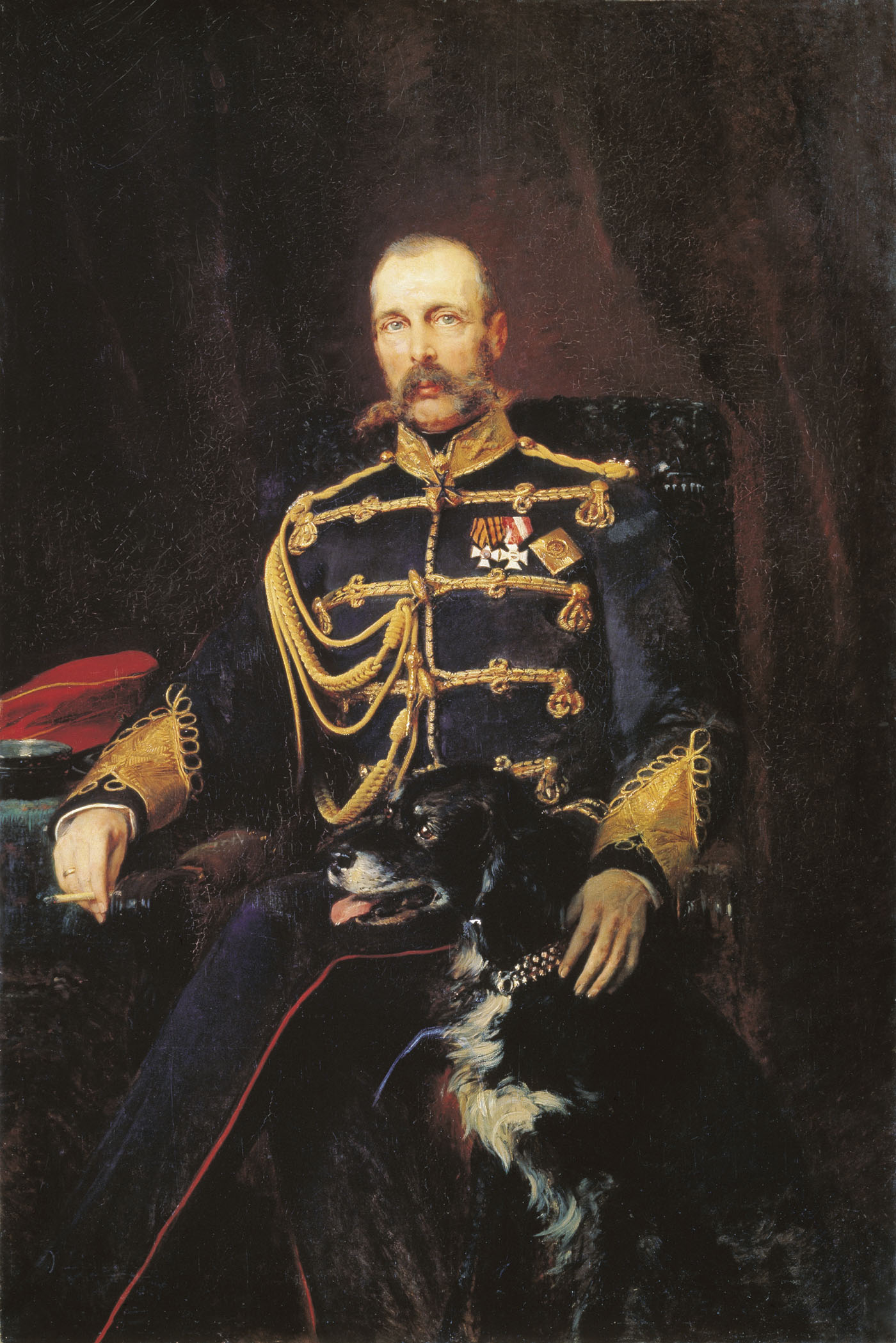
Tsar Alexander II

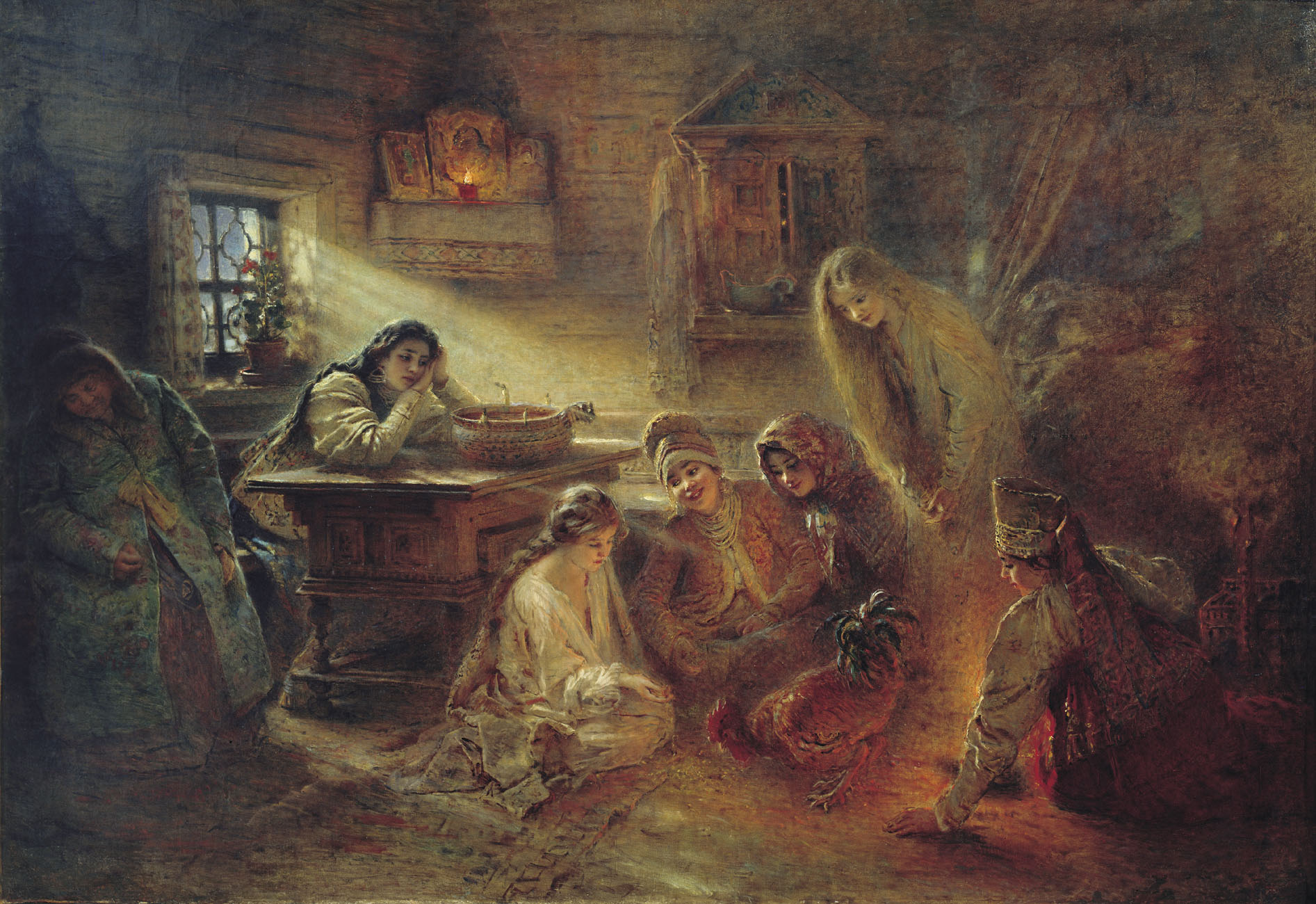
Christmastide Divination. Historic paintings of Russian peasant life made Konstantin Makovsky popular in Russia

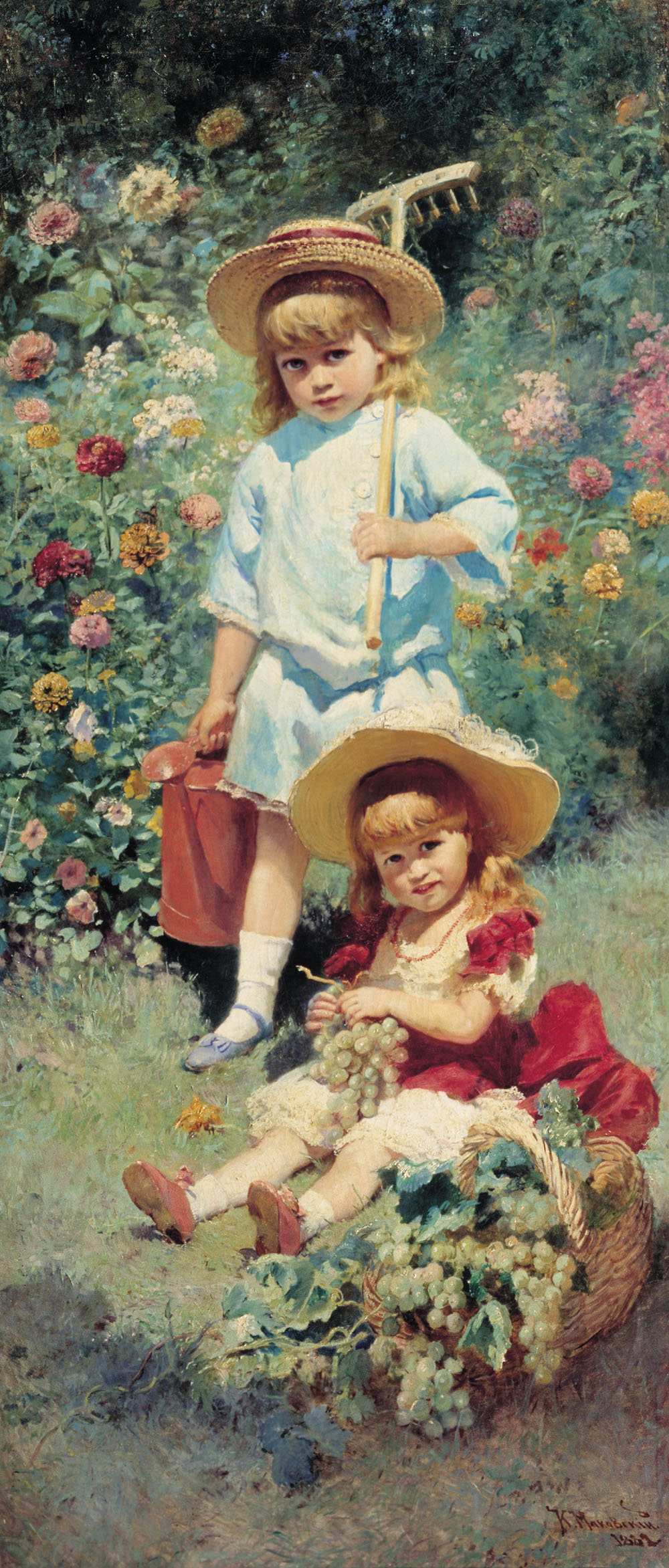
Children of the Artist, 1882

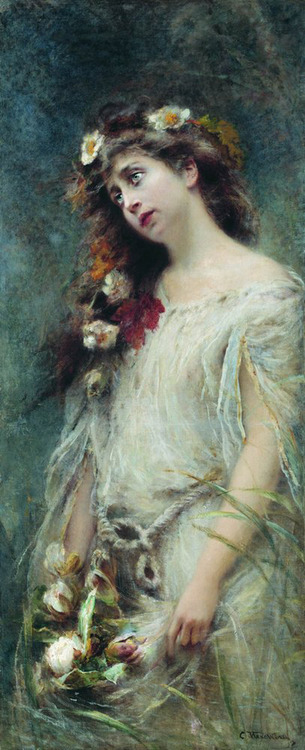
Ophelia

== See also ==
- List of Orientalist artists
- Orientalism
