= Belyayev =

Belyayev (masculine) or Belyayeva (feminine) is a Russian patronymic surname derived from the nickname Belyay/Belyai (Беляй), for white (blond) hair. Notable people with the surname include:

- Alena Belyaeva (born 1992), Russian footballer
- Alexander Belyaev (1884–1942), Russian author of science fiction
- Anatoli Belyayev (1952–2025), Belarusian ice hockey player and coach
- Anatoly Belyaev (1906–1967), Soviet scientist in the field of metallurgy
- Dmitry Belyayev (disambiguation), several people
- Ekaterina Beliaeva (born 2003), Russian diver
- Evgeny Belyaev (1926–1994), Soviet tenor soloist with the Alexandrov Ensemble
- Galina Belyayeva (born 1961), Russian actor
- Galina Belyayeva (sport shooter, born 1951), Russian-Kazakhstani sport shooter
- Galina Belyayeva (sport shooter, born 1967), Russian sport shooter
- Ivan Belyayev (disambiguation), several people
- Mikhail Belyaev (1863–1918), Russian statesman, military figure, and infantry general
- Mitrofan Belyayev (1836–1903/04), Russian entrepreneur and music publisher
- Nikolai Belyaev (1903–1966), Soviet Communist Party leader
- Nina Belyaeva (born 1957), Russian public policy researcher
- Oleksandr Byelyayev (born 1999), Ukrainian footballer
- Olga Beliaeva (born 1985), Russian water polo player
- Pavel Belyayev (1925–1970), Soviet cosmonaut
- Raisa Belyaeva (1912–1943), Russian fighter pilot
- Sasha Belyaeva (born 1998), Russian musician and social artist
- Sergey Belyayev (1960–2020), Kazakhstani shooter
- Spartak Belyaev (1923–2017), Soviet physicist and academician
- Tetiana Beliaieva (born 1971), Ukrainian judoka
- Vadim Belyaev (born 1966), Russian banker
- Volodymyr Byelyayev (born 1944), Soviet Olympic gold medalist in volleyball in 1968
- Vladimir Belyaev (weightlifter) (1940–2020), Soviet Olympic silver medalist in weightlifting in 1968
- Vladimir Belyayev (disambiguation), multiple people
- Yevgeny Belyayev (1954–2003), Soviet/Russian skier
- Yurii Bieliaiev (born 1992), Belarusian competitive ice dancer
- Yury Belyayev (born 1947), Russian actor
- Ramil Belyaev (also Bilal; born 1978), Russian-born Tatar imam of the Finnish-Islamic Congregation

== See also ==
- Belyaev (crater), a lunar crater
- Belyayevo
