= Orlov, Russia =

Orlov (Russian: Орлов) is the name of several inhabited localities in Russia.

== Modern localities ==
- Orlov, Kirov Oblast, town
- Rural localities
  - Villages
    - Orlova, Irkutsk Oblast
    - Orlova, Sverdlovsk Oblast
  - Khutors
    - Orlov, Alexeyevsky District, Belgorod Oblast
    - Orlov, Veydelevsky District
    - Orlov, Krasnodar Krai
  - Settlements
    - Orlov, Kursk Oblast
    - Orlov, Oryol Oblast

=== Alternative names ===
- Orlov, alternative name of Orlovo, a village under the administrative jurisdiction of Kiknur Urban-Type Settlement in Kiknursky District of Kirov Oblast; 57°20′N 47°15′E
