= Shatalov =

Shatalov (masculine, Russian: Шаталов) or Shatalova (feminine, Russian: Шаталова) is a Russian surname. Notable people with the surname include:

- Vladimir Shatalov (1927–2021), Soviet Kazakhstani cosmonaut
- Yuri Shatalov (1945–2018), Soviet Russian ice hockey player
- Yuriy Shatalov (born 1963), Ukrainian-Russian footballer and manager
- Vladimir Viktorovich Shkatelov (1861–1940), Russian and Soviet chemist

== See also ==
- Shatalov (crater), lunar impact crater
