= Belyayevo =

Belyayevo (Russian: Беляево) is the name of several rural localities in Russia.

== Modern localities ==
=== Chelyabinsk Oblast ===
As of 2014, one rural locality in Chelyabinsk Oblast bears this name:

Chelyabinsk Oblast location map
Location of Belyayevo in Chelyabinsk Oblast
- Belyayevo, Chelyabinsk Oblast, a settlement in Unkurdinsky Selsoviet of Nyazepetrovsky District; 55°54′N 59°19′E

=== Chuvash Republic ===
As of 2014, one rural locality in the Chuvash Republic bears this name:

Chuvash Republic location map
Location of Belyayevo in the Chuvash Republic
- Belyayevo, Chuvash Republic, a village in Aldiarovskoye Rural Settlement of Yantikovsky District; 55°35′N 47°44′E

=== Ivanovo Oblast ===
As of 2014, two rural localities in Ivanovo Oblast bear this name:

- Belyayevo, Puchezhsky District, Ivanovo Oblast, a village in Puchezhsky District
- Belyayevo, Yuryevetsky District, Ivanovo Oblast, a village in Yuryevetsky District

=== Kaluga Oblast ===
As of 2014, one rural locality in Kaluga Oblast bears this name:

- Belyayevo, Kaluga Oblast, a village in Yukhnovsky District

=== Kirov Oblast ===
As of 2014, one rural locality in Kirov Oblast bears this name:

Kirov Oblast location map
Location of Belyayevo in Kirov Oblast
- Belyayevo, Kirov Oblast, a selo in Potnyakovsky Rural Okrug of Kiknursky District; 57°22′N 47°25′E

=== Kursk Oblast ===
As of 2014, one rural locality in Kursk Oblast bears this name:

- Belyayevo, Kursk Oblast, a selo in Belyayevsky Selsoviet of Konyshyovsky District

=== Lipetsk Oblast ===
As of 2014, two rural localities in Lipetsk Oblast bear this name:

Lipetsk Oblast distribution map
Distribution of the inhabited localities called Belyayevo in Lipetsk Oblast.
- Belyayevo, Prigorodny Selsoviet, Usmansky District, Lipetsk Oblast, a railway facility in Prigorodny Selsoviet of Usmansky District; 51°58′N 39°41′E
- Belyayevo, Studensky Selsoviet, Usmansky District, Lipetsk Oblast, a selo in Studensky Selsoviet of Usmansky District; 51°58′N 39°41′E

=== Mari El Republic ===
As of 2014, one rural locality in the Mari El Republic bears this name:

Mari El Republic location map
Location of Belyayevo in the Mari El Republic
- Belyayevo, Mari El Republic, a village in Shulkinsky Rural Okrug of Orshansky District; 56°56′N 48°14′E

=== Moscow Oblast ===
As of 2014, three rural localities in Moscow Oblast bear this name:

Moscow Oblast distribution map
Distribution of the inhabited localities called Belyayevo in Moscow Oblast.
- Belyayevo, Chekhovsky District, Moscow Oblast, a village in Stremilovskoye Rural Settlement of Chekhovsky District; 55°09′N 37°20′E
- Belyayevo, Lukhovitsky District, Moscow Oblast, a village in Fruktovskoye Rural Settlement of Lukhovitsky District; 54°52′N 39°09′E
- Belyayevo, Serebryano-Prudsky District, Moscow Oblast, a village in Uzunovskoye Rural Settlement of Serebryano-Prudsky District; 54°31′N 38°30′E

=== Nizhny Novgorod Oblast ===
As of 2014, five rural localities in Nizhny Novgorod Oblast bear this name:

Nizhny Novgorod Oblast distribution map
Distribution of the inhabited localities called Belyayevo in Nizhny Novgorod Oblast.
- Belyayevo, Ardatovsky District, Nizhny Novgorod Oblast, a village in Kuzhendeyevsky Selsoviet of Ardatovsky District; 55°14′N 43°09′E
- Belyayevo, Fedurinsky Selsoviet, Gorodetsky District, Nizhny Novgorod Oblast, a village in Fedurinsky Selsoviet of Gorodetsky District; 56°49′N 43°26′E
- Belyayevo, Smirkinsky Selsoviet, Gorodetsky District, Nizhny Novgorod Oblast, a village in Smirkinsky Selsoviet of Gorodetsky District; 56°54′N 43°32′E
- Belyayevo, Koverninsky District, Nizhny Novgorod Oblast, a village in Gavrilovsky Selsoviet of Koverninsky District; 57°06′N 43°39′E
- Belyayevo, Sokolsky District, Nizhny Novgorod Oblast, a village in Loyminsky Selsoviet of Sokolsky District; 56°58′N 43°26′E

=== Pskov Oblast ===
As of 2014, one rural locality in Pskov Oblast bears this name:

- Belyayevo, Pskov Oblast, a village in Ostrovsky District

=== Ryazan Oblast ===
As of 2014, one rural locality in Ryazan Oblast bears this name:

- Belyayevo, Ryazan Oblast, a village in Belovsky Rural Okrug of Klepikovsky District

=== Smolensk Oblast ===
As of 2014, two rural localities in Smolensk Oblast bear this name:

- Belyayevo, Ugransky District, Smolensk Oblast, a village in Znamenskoye Rural Settlement of Ugransky District
- Belyayevo, Velizhsky District, Smolensk Oblast, a village in Belyayevskoye Rural Settlement of Velizhsky District

=== Republic of Tatarstan ===
As of 2014, one rural locality in the Republic of Tatarstan bears this name:

- Belyayevo, Republic of Tatarstan, a village in Kaybitsky District

=== Tula Oblast ===
As of 2014, two rural localities in Tula Oblast bear this name:

- Belyayevo, Belyovsky District, Tula Oblast, a village in Belyayevsky Rural Okrug of Belyovsky District
- Belyayevo, Suvorovsky District, Tula Oblast, a village in Bogdanovskaya Rural Territory of Suvorovsky District

=== Tver Oblast ===
As of 2014, four rural localities in Tver Oblast bear this name:

- Belyayevo, Bezhetsky District, Tver Oblast, a village in Zhitishchenskoye Rural Settlement of Bezhetsky District
- Belyayevo, Rameshkovsky District, Tver Oblast, a village in Kiverichi Rural Settlement of Rameshkovsky District
- Belyayevo, Kudryavtsevskoye Rural Settlement, Toropetsky District, Tver Oblast, a village in Kudryavtsevskoye Rural Settlement of Toropetsky District
- Belyayevo, Skvortsovskoye Rural Settlement, Toropetsky District, Tver Oblast, a village in Skvortsovskoye Rural Settlement of Toropetsky District

== Alternative names ==
- Belyayevo, alternative name of Belyayeva, a village in Boshinsky Rural Administrative Okrug of Karachevsky District in Bryansk Oblast; 53°01′N 34°55′E
- Belyayevo, alternative name of Bebyayevo, a village in Bebyayevsky Selsoviet of Arzamassky District in Nizhny Novgorod Oblast; 55°19′N 43°56′E

== See also ==
- Belyayev
