= Beljajeva =

Beljajeva is an Russian surname. Notable people with the surname include:

- Adelina Beljajeva (born 2003), Estonian rhythmic gymnast
- Julia Beljajeva (born 1992), Estonian fencer

== See also ==
- Belyayeva, Russian surname
