= Princess Melikoff =

Australian princess and philanthropist (1893–1988)

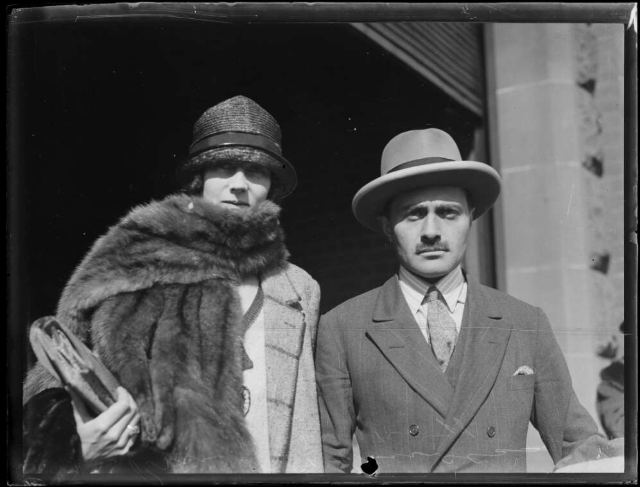
- Princess Melikoff with Prince Maximilian Melikoff, c. 1934
- Born: Pauline Curran; 9 February 1893; Hobart, Tasmania, Australia
- Died: 30 January 1988 (aged 94); London, England, UK
- Spouse: Prince Maximilian Melikoff (m. 1926; died 1950)
- House: Milyukov family
- Father: John Bury "JB" Curran
- Mother: Elizabeth Sarah Curran

Princess Pauline Melikoff (née Curran; 9 February 1893 – 30 January 1988), known as Princess Melikoff, was an Australian princess, philanthropist and member of the Milyukov family.

== Early life ==
Melikoff was born Pauline Curran in Hobart, Tasmania on 9 February 1893 to John Bury "JB" Curran, a New Zealand-born merchant and racehorse owner, and Elizabeth Sarah Curran (née Prosser). The youngest of around 10 siblings, she was named after her father's racehorse "Pauline", who had won the Hobart Cup 8 days before her birth. Curran was educated at St Michael's Collegiate School.

In 1905, her father's personal friend George Adams passed away, leaving 20 shares of his trust to Curran's father. This trust controlled the ownership of the Tattersalls gambling monopoly, and a number of other business interests. This instantly made the Curran family extremely wealthy.

Curran was engaged to a Captain Patrick FitzGerald, aide de camp to Sir Francis Newdegate, but the engagement was broken off at the end of the war. Her father left his estate in trust for his wife and Pauline, until Pauline was married, at which time it would be divided among his 10 children. Perhaps in an attempt to find Curran a husband, she and her mother left for Europe in 1923.

== Marriage ==
In 1925, she met Prince Maximilian Melikoff (1884–1950), when he was her chauffeur, and three months later was engaged to him in Monte Carlo.

Melikoff was the second son of Prince Petr Levanovich de Somhetie and Baroness Anna Maksimilianovna D'Osten-Sachen. By his father, he was grandson of Levan Ivanovich Melikov, and by his grandmother, great grandson of George XII, King of Georgia.

In 1926 they were married at St David's Cathedral, Hobart, The marriage combined her money and her unremarkable family background with her husband's inheritance. He had no land or subjects but he did have a Russian title. It was said that their 1926 marriage was the fanciest that Hobart had ever seen. Over 5000 people waited outside the cathedral to catch a glimpse of the prince and princess.

== Legacy ==
Curran's will established the Princess Melikoff Trust. The trust funds annual endowments to the Department of Natural Resources and Environment's marine conservation and to the St Ann's Aged Care Home (now Respect Aged Care). Since 1988 the fund has distributed 7.55 million towards marine conservation.
