= Alexey Venetsianov =

Russian painter (1780–1847)

- Алексей Венецианов
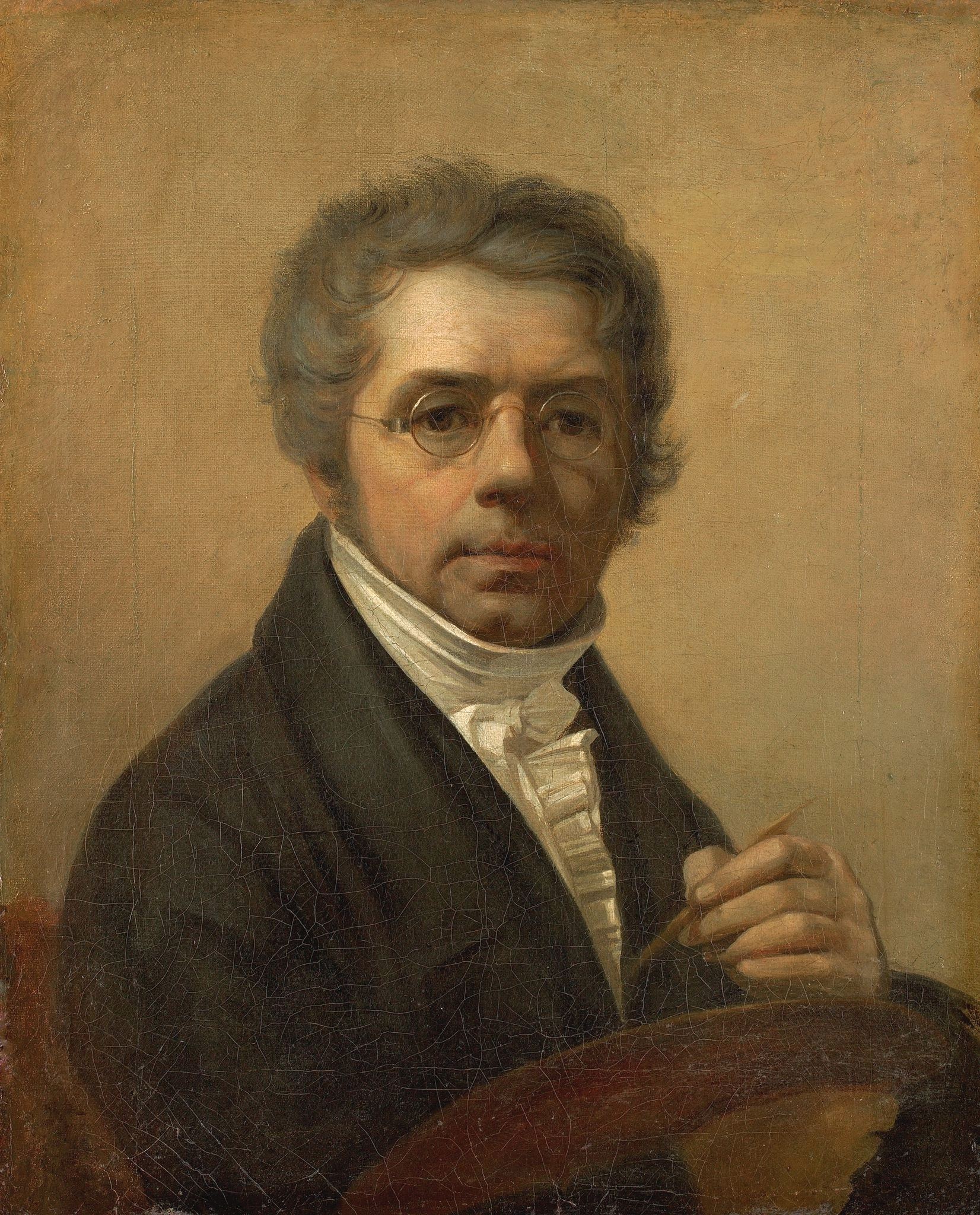
- Self-portrait, 1811
- Born: 18 February 1780; Moscow, Russia
- Died: 16 December 1847 (aged 67); Poddubye, Tver Governorate, Russia
- Education: Member Academy of Arts (1811)
- Known for: Painting
- Style: Romanticism

Alexey Gavrilovich Venetsianov (Russian: Алексей Гаврилович Венецианов; 18 February [O.S. 7 February] 1780 – 16 December [O.S. 4 December] 1847) was a Russian painter, renowned for his paintings devoted to peasant life and ordinary people.

== Life ==
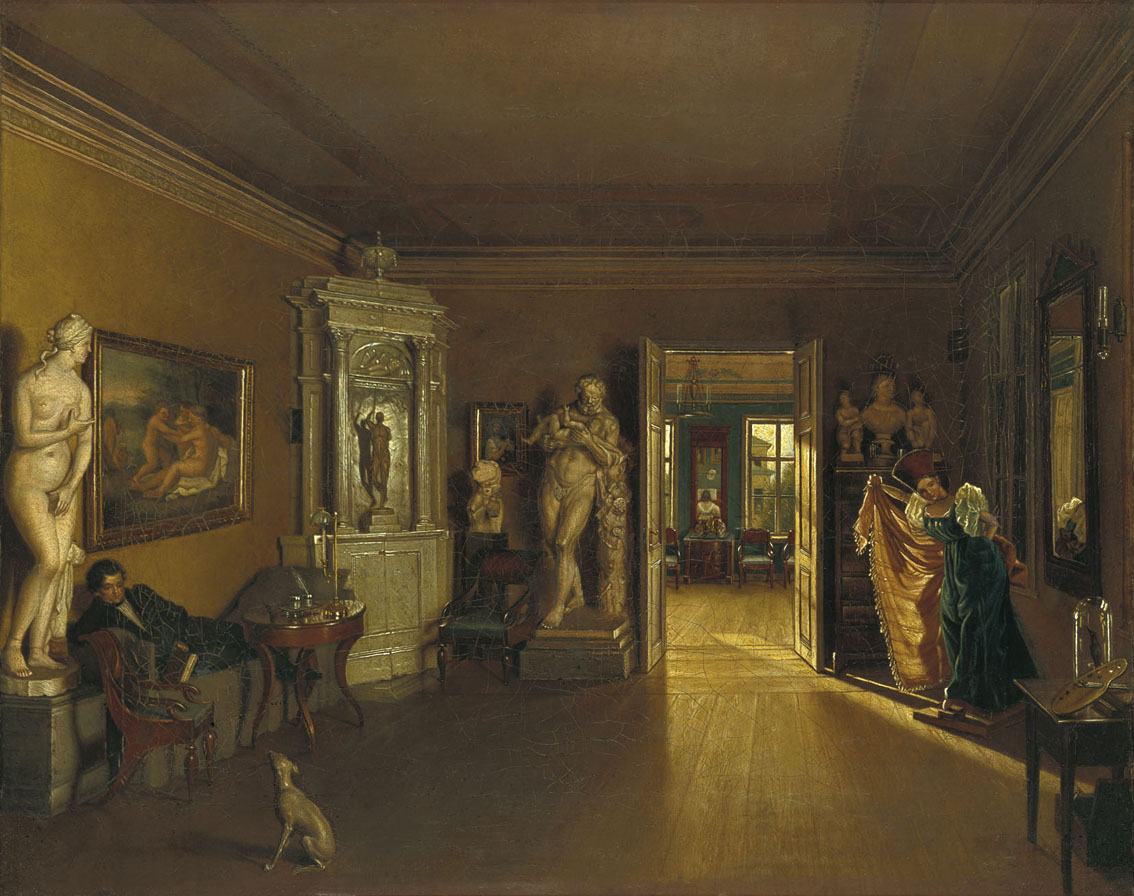
Venetsianov's study by Fyodor Slavyansky

Alexey Venetsianov was born into a merchant family, of Greek descent, in Moscow. He entered the civil service in the early 19th century and moved to St. Petersburg, where he began to study art. He first practiced with pictures of the Hermitage and with portraits of friends. He later became acquainted with Vladimir Borovikovsky and lived in his house as an apprentice. He tried to work as a freelance portraitist, but received few commissions. In 1811, the Board of the Academy of Arts awarded him the title of Academician for his two works: Self-Portrait and Portrait of K. I. Golovachevsky and the Younger Pupils of the Academy.

In 1819, devoting himself purely to art, Venetsianov left the service, bought the village of Safonkovo, and settled there. During this time he painted scenes from nature that he observed around him. These works were of prime importance in his career. He painted portraits of peasants, and scenes illustrating rural life. He was the first to depict peasant life in Russian art. His works achieved great success at the exhibition of 1824, where he received critical praise.

Venetsianov wished to become a professor in the Academy of Arts, but the academicians did not grant him their approval, mainly because he lacked academic training. During the years prior to 1820 he began to attract young people from poor backgrounds, and even serfs such as Grigory Soroka, to teach them painting. By the middle of the 1820s he had a group of followers, and established his own school of painting. Emperor Nicholas I, who liked to promote "national trends", expressed his approval for the artist and appointed him a court painter. This title gave him the financial support necessary for running the school, where tuition was practically free.

Venetsianov died in the village of Poddubye in Tver Governorate on 16 December [O.S. 4 December] 1847; he was killed when his horses bolted and his carriage fell down a steep slope.

== Selected works ==
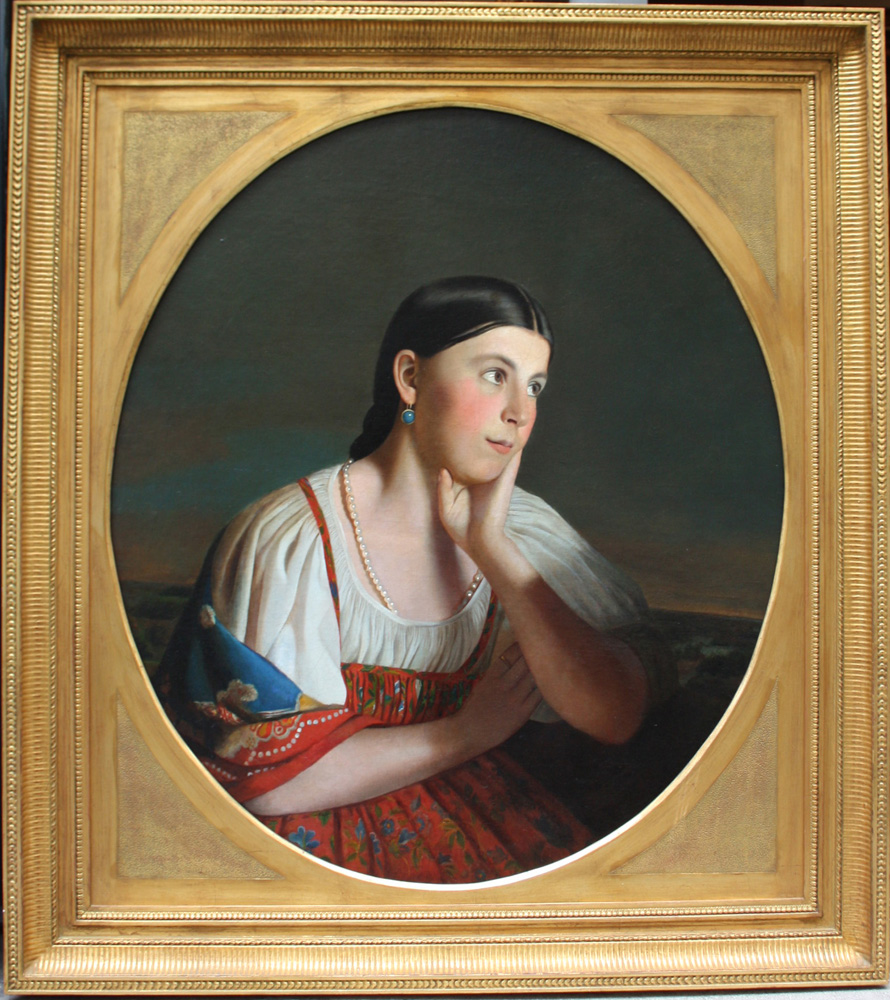
Portrait of a Peasant Girl

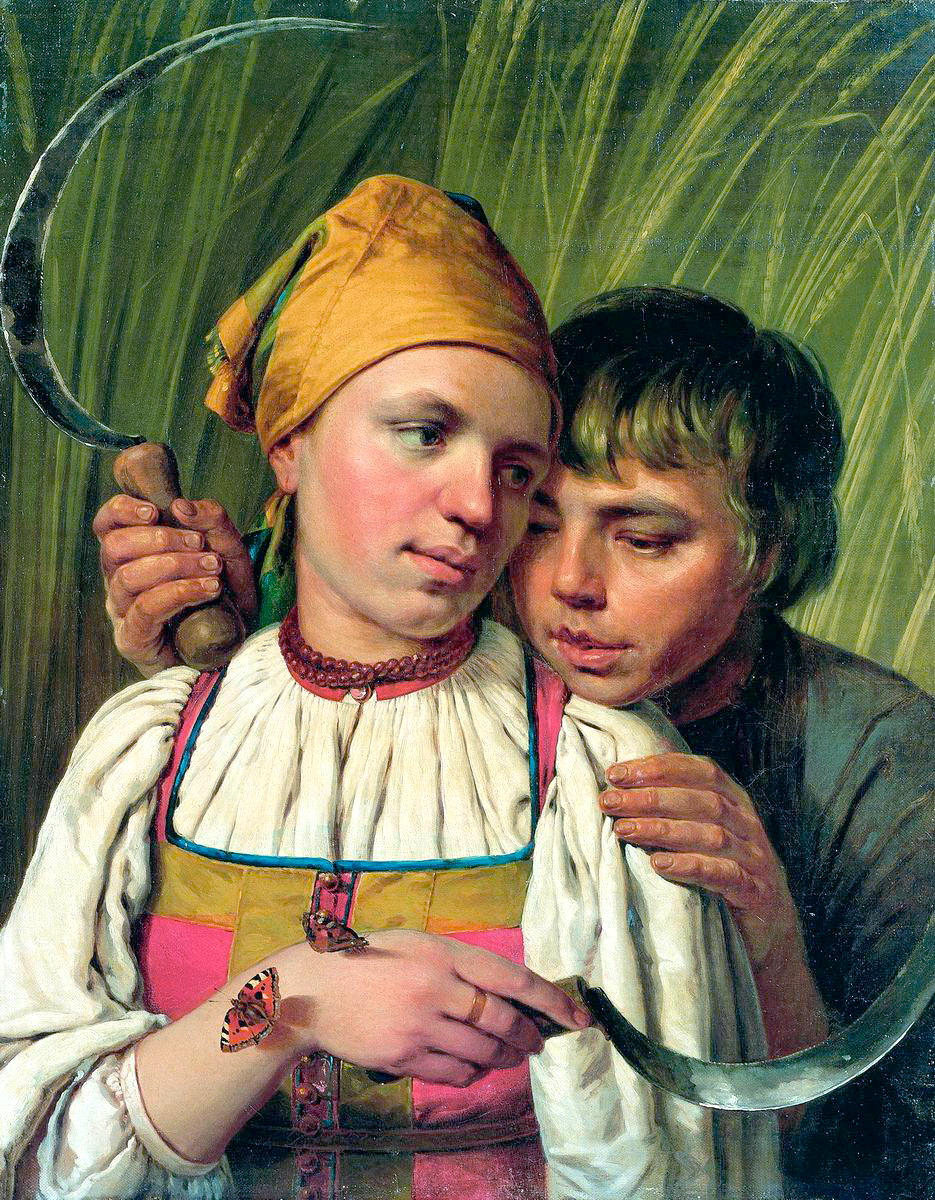
The Reapers

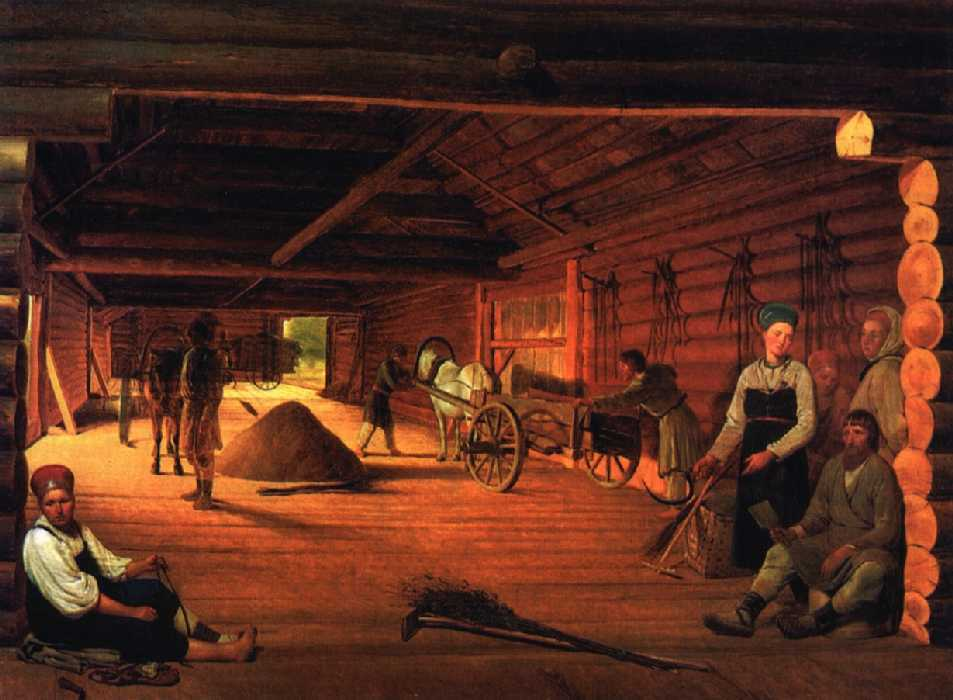
Threshing Floor (1821–1823)

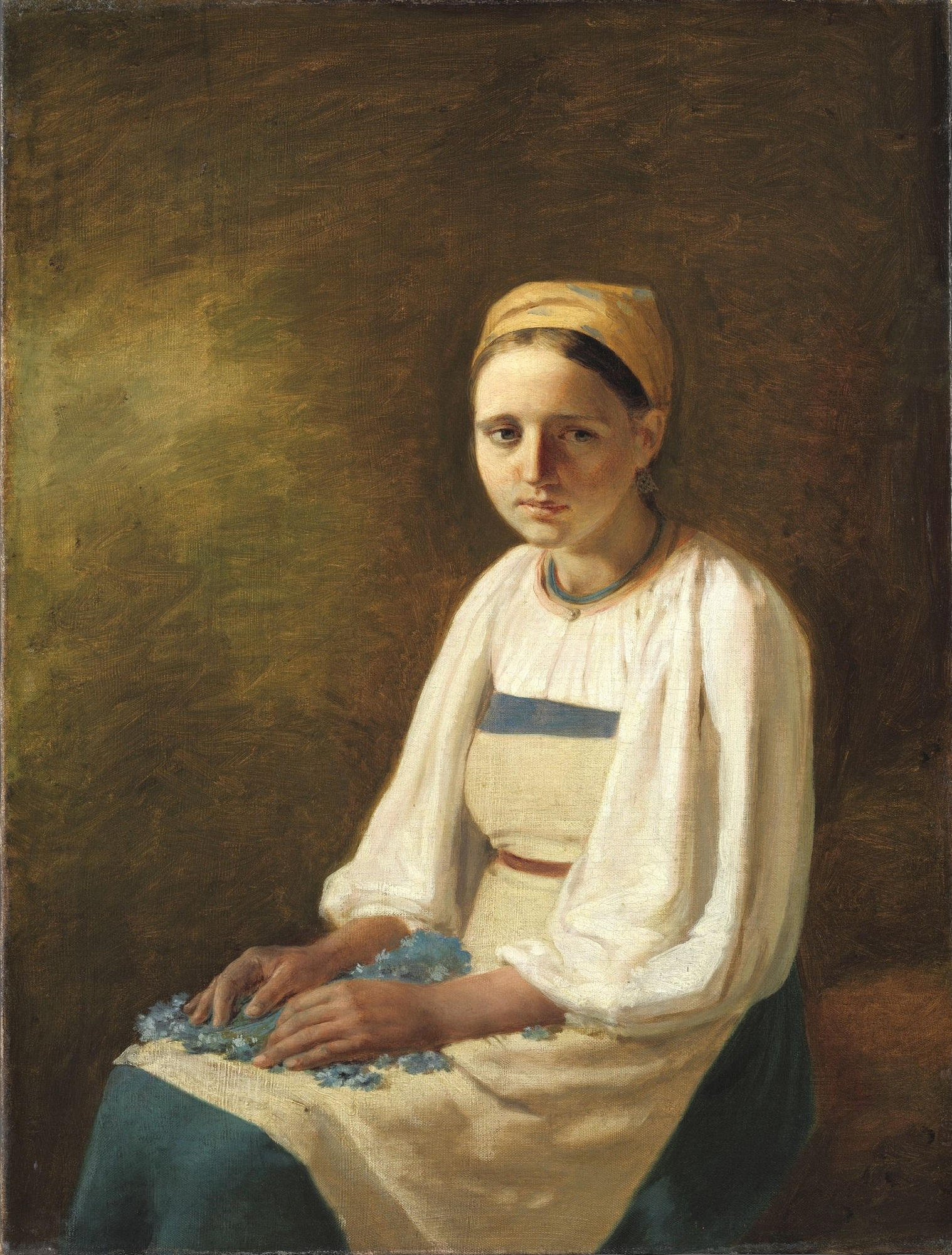
Peasant Girl with Cornflowers (1820s)

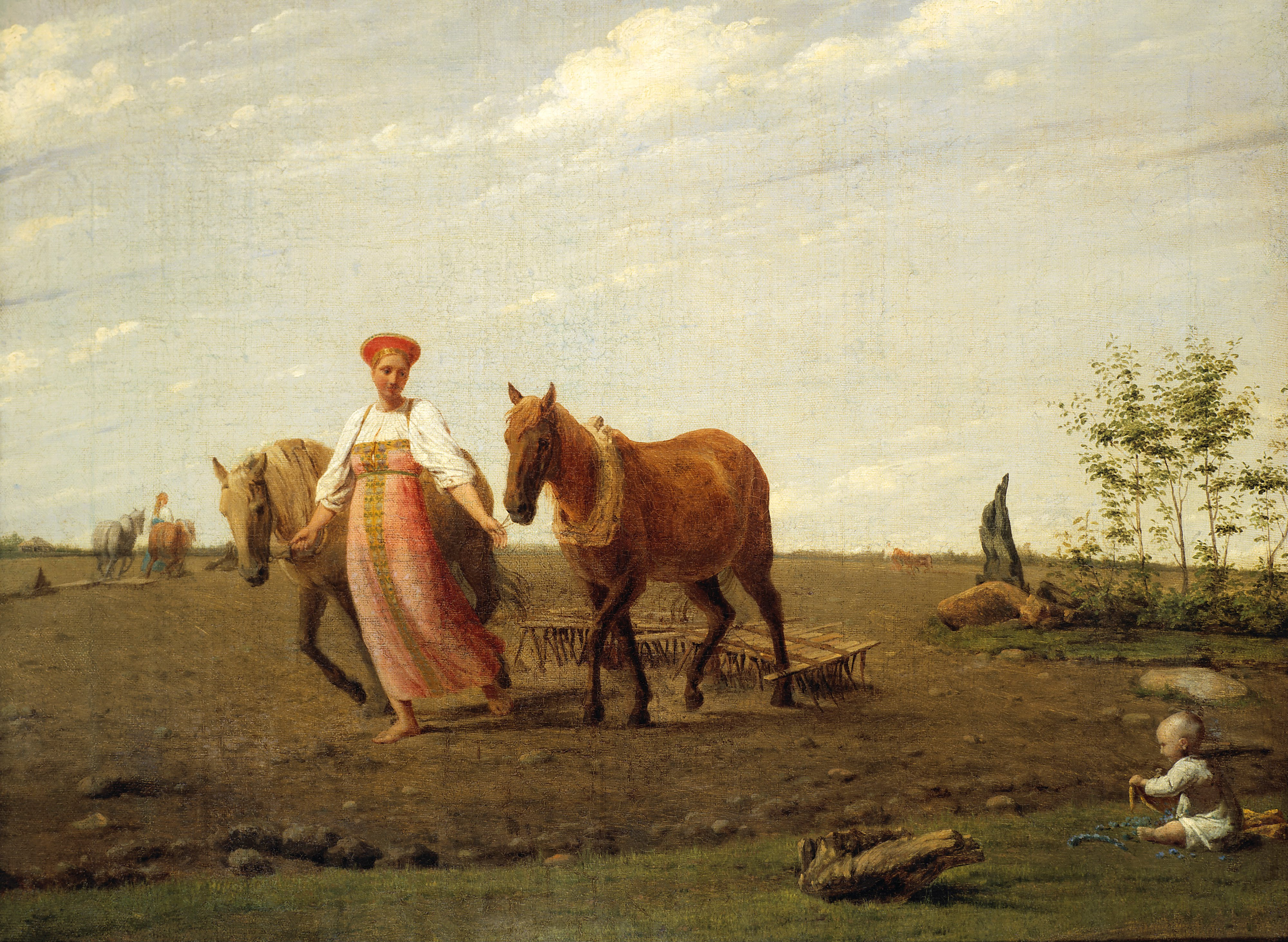
In the Ploughed Field: Spring (1820s)

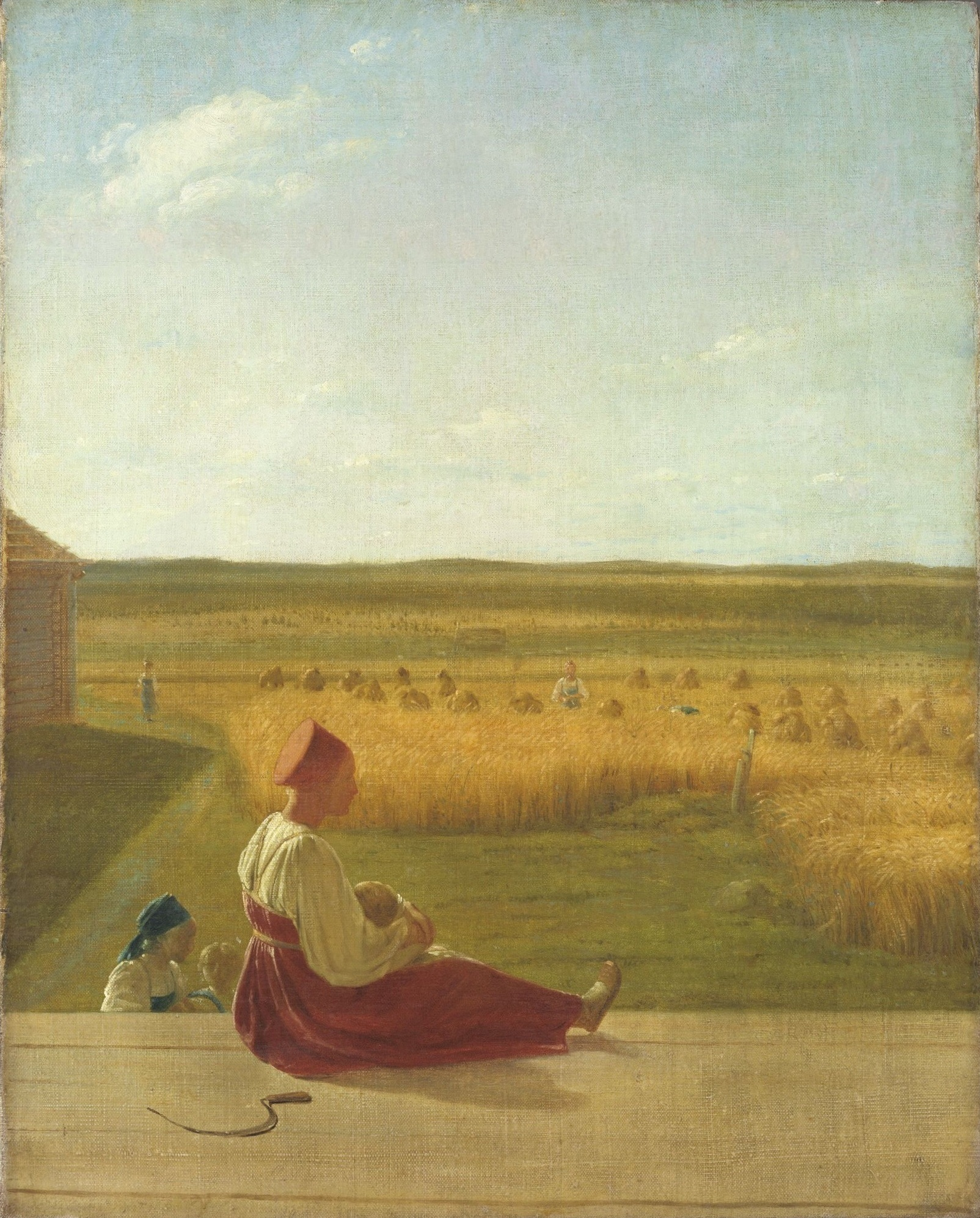
Summer, Reaping (1820s)

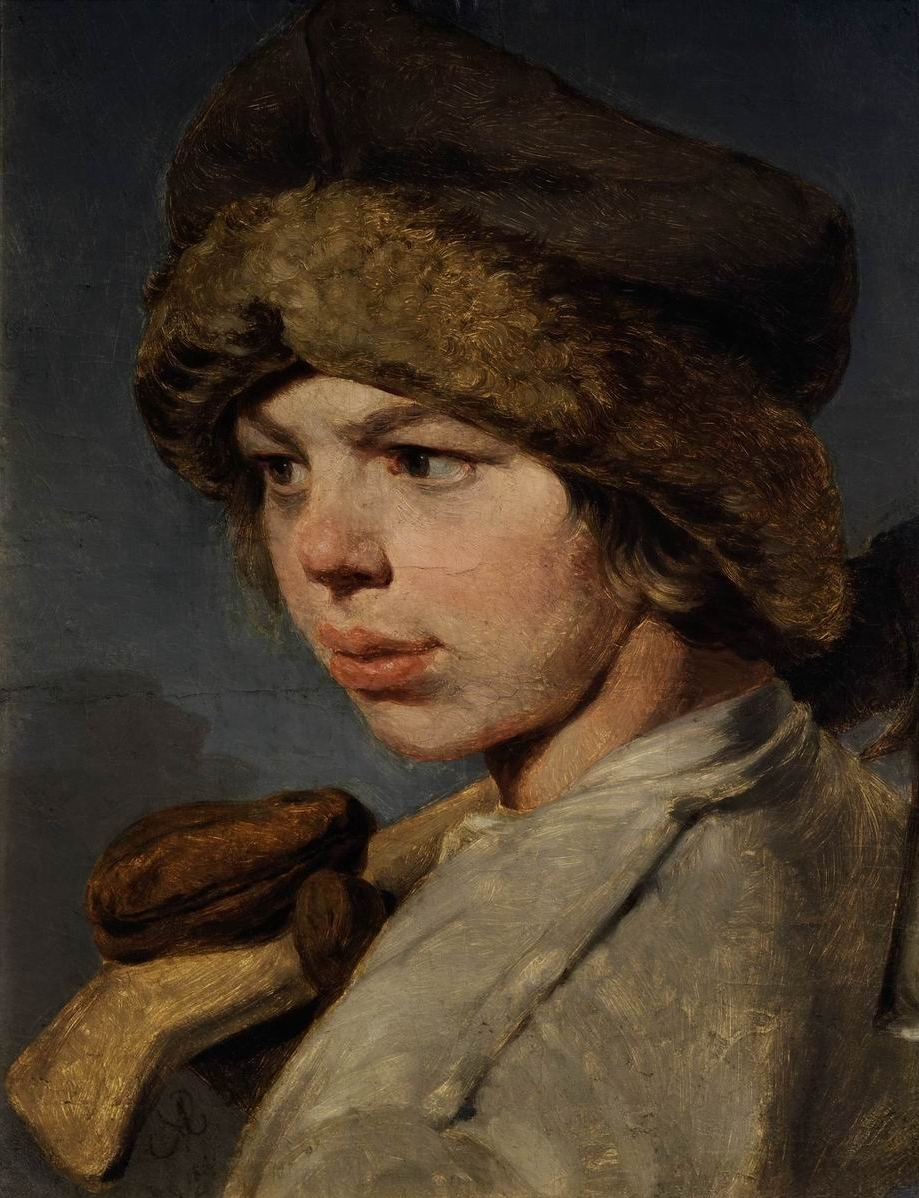
Zakharka (1825)

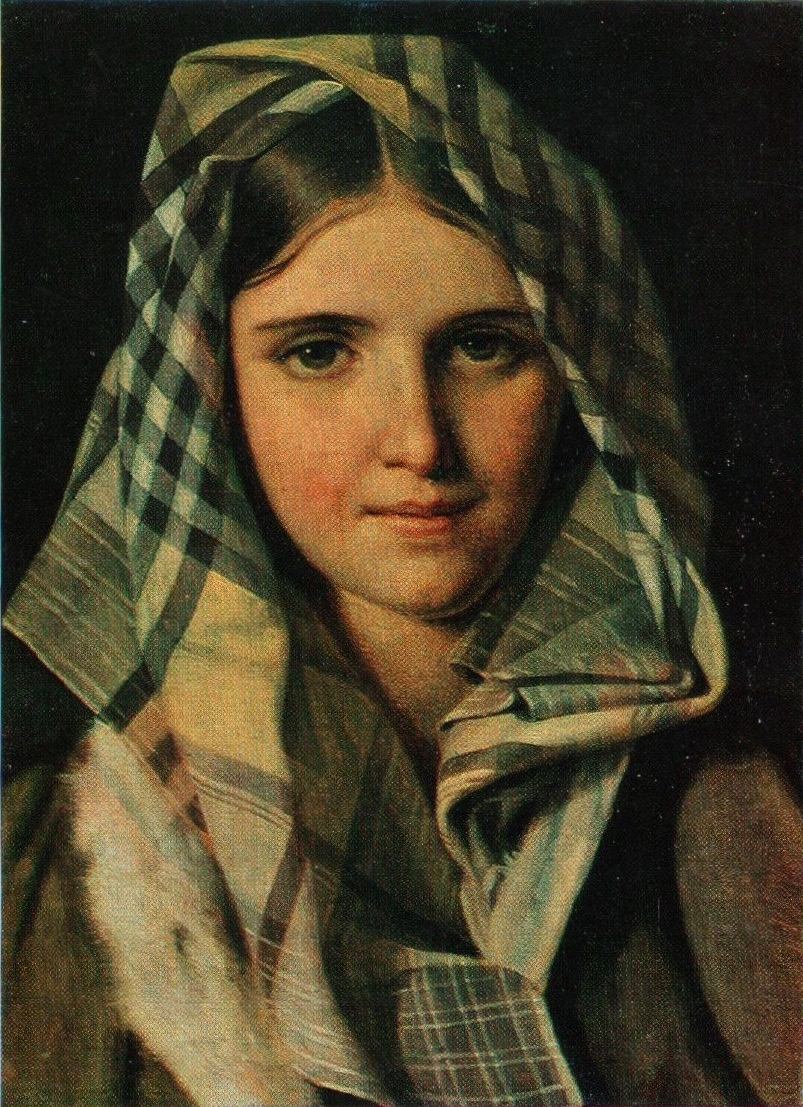
Girl in a Checkered Shawl

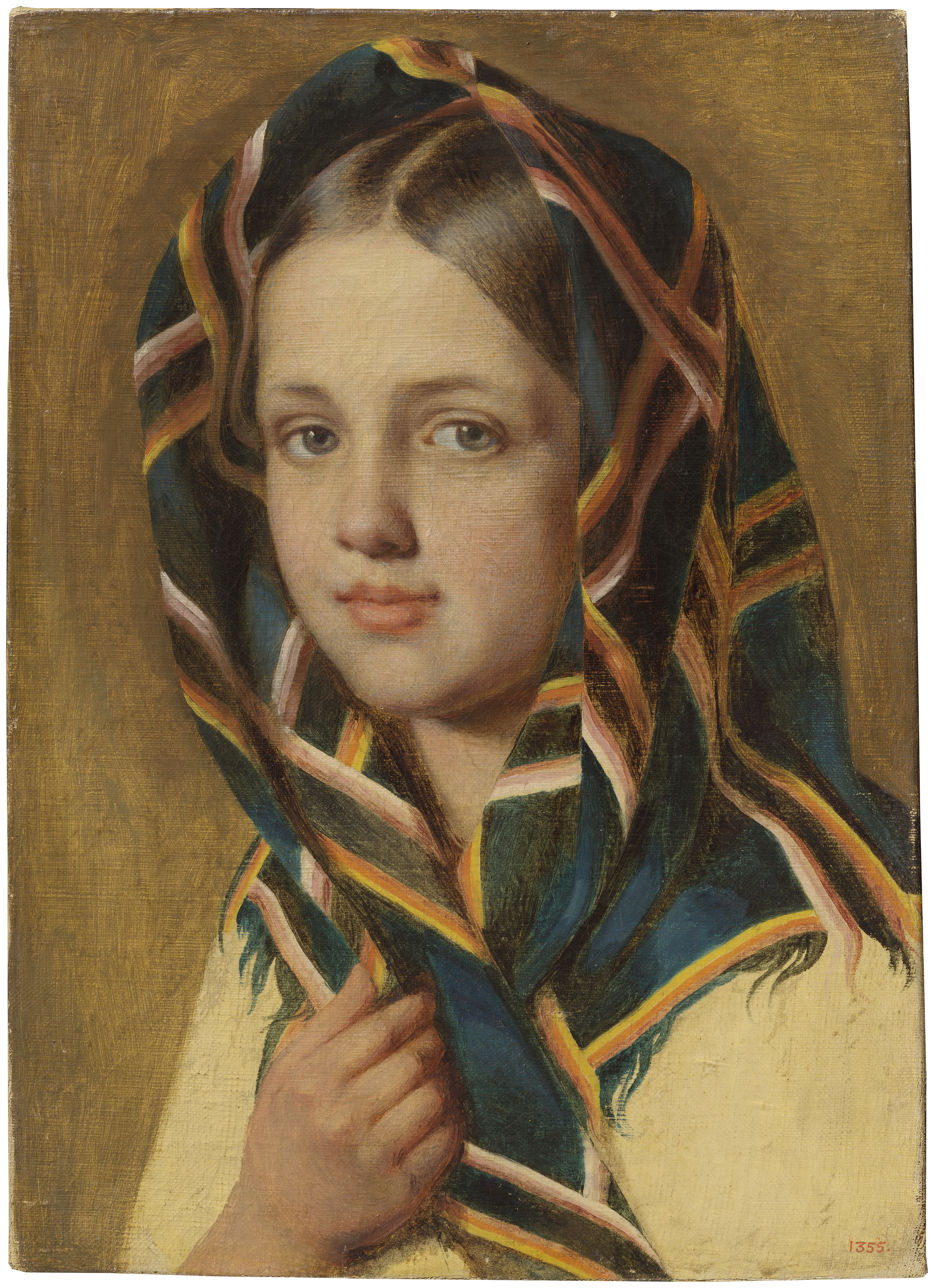
Girl in a Shawl

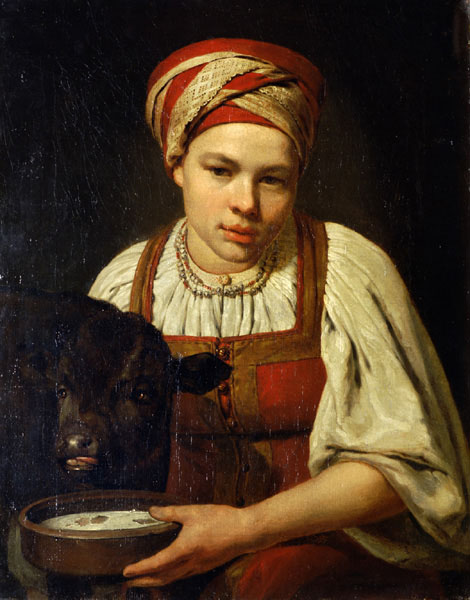
Girl with a Calf

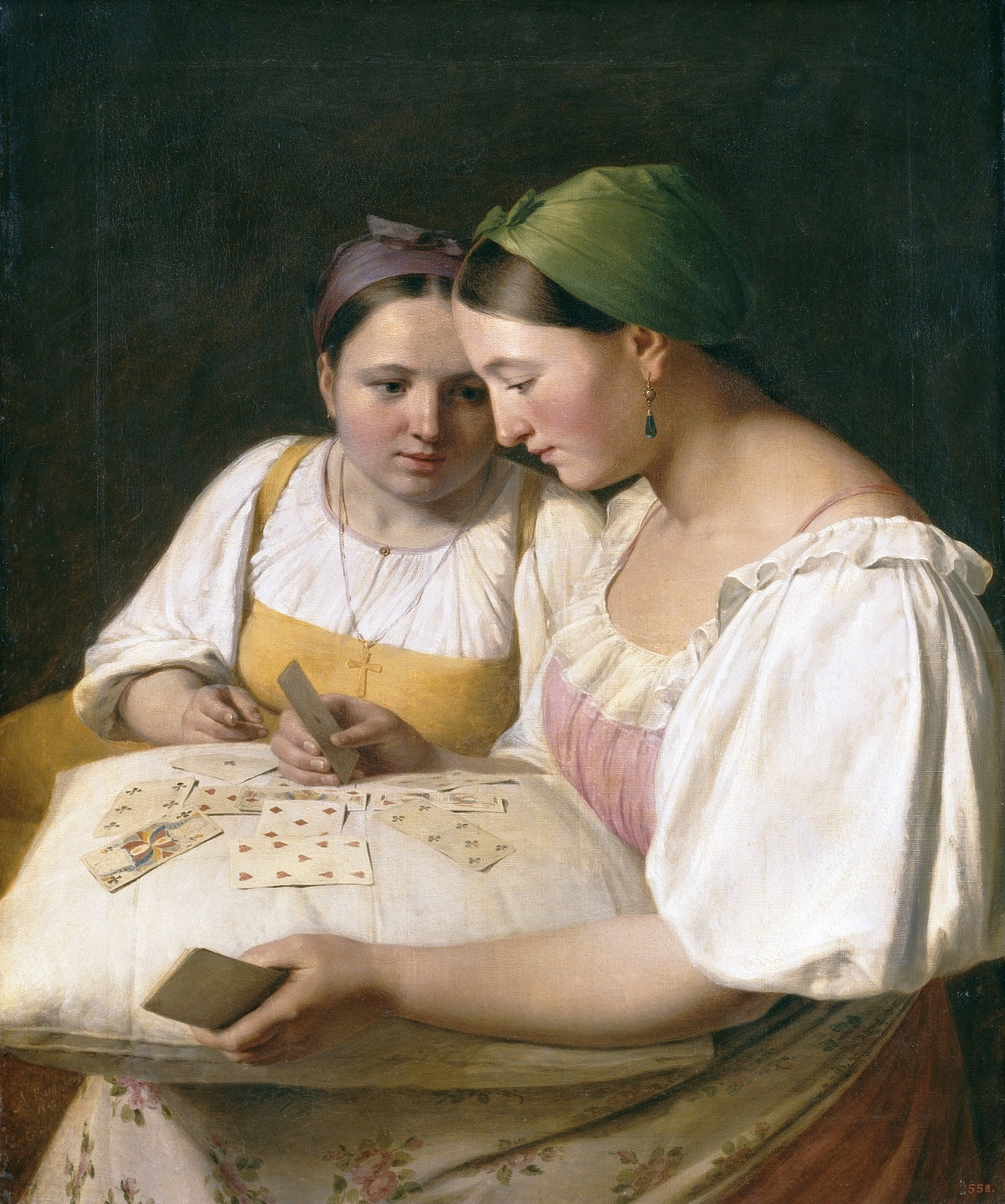
Fortune-telling (1842)

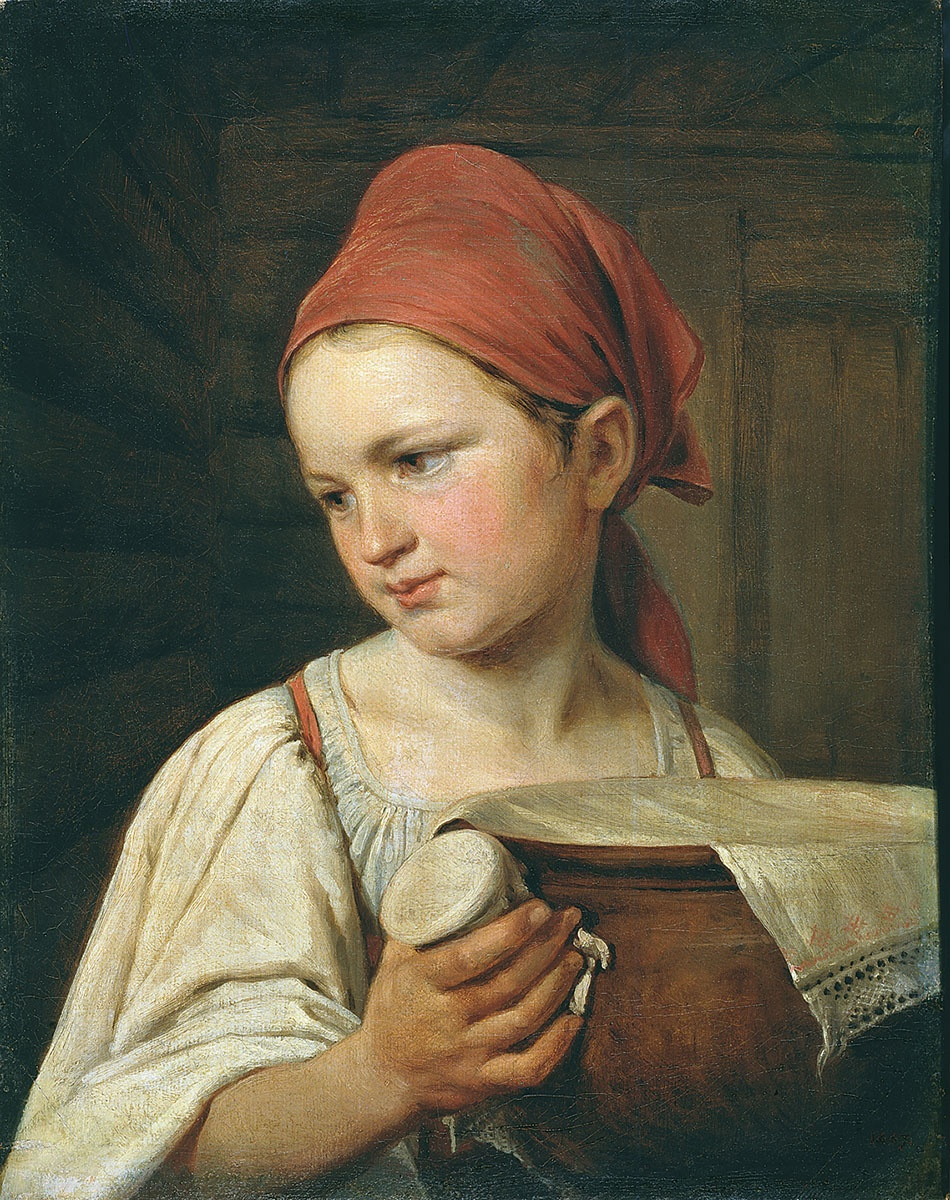
Farmer's Child with Milk

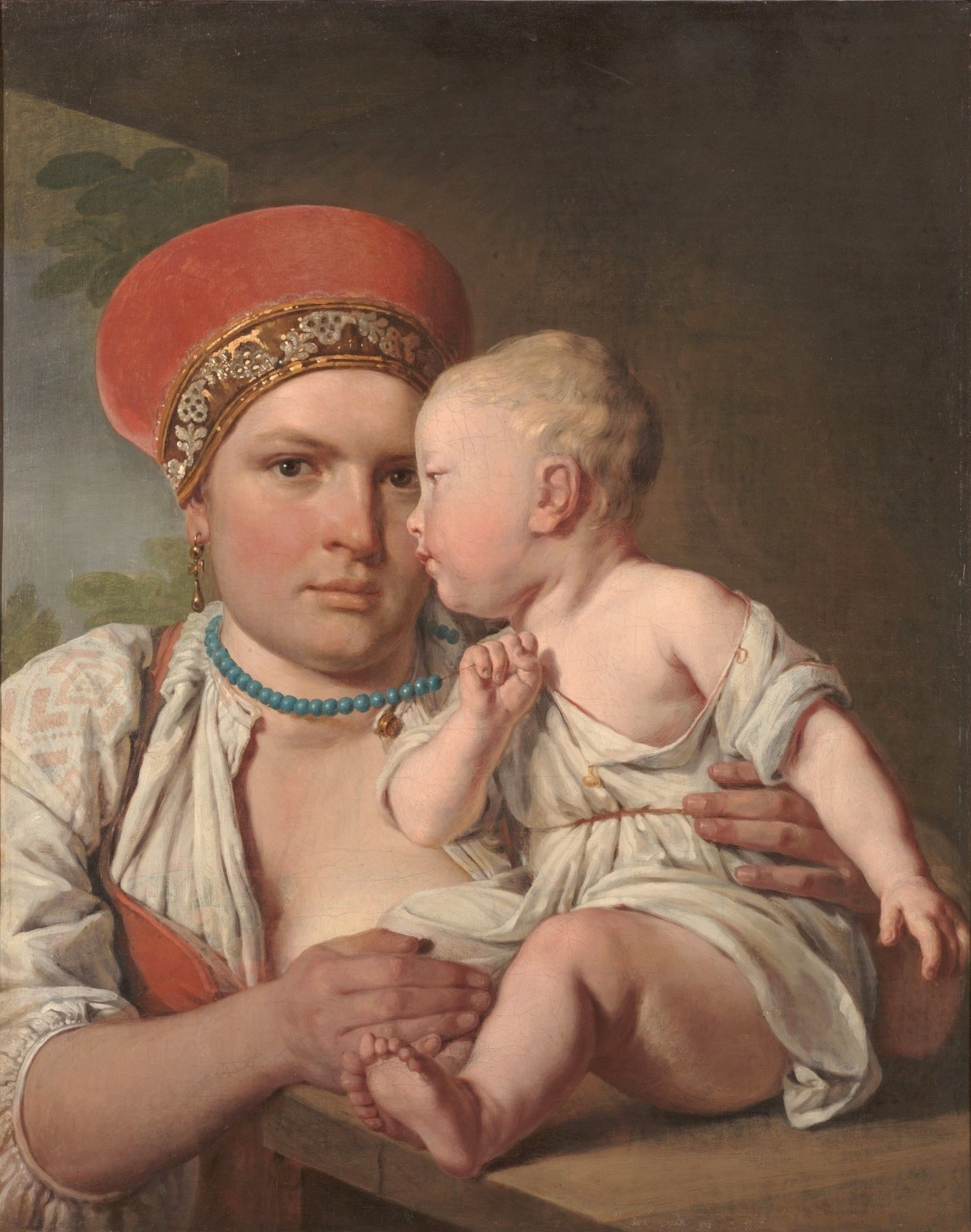
Nurse with a Baby

== See also ==
- List of Russian artists

Students

- Evgraf Krendovsky
- Kapiton Zelentsov
