= Grigory Soroka =

Russian painter

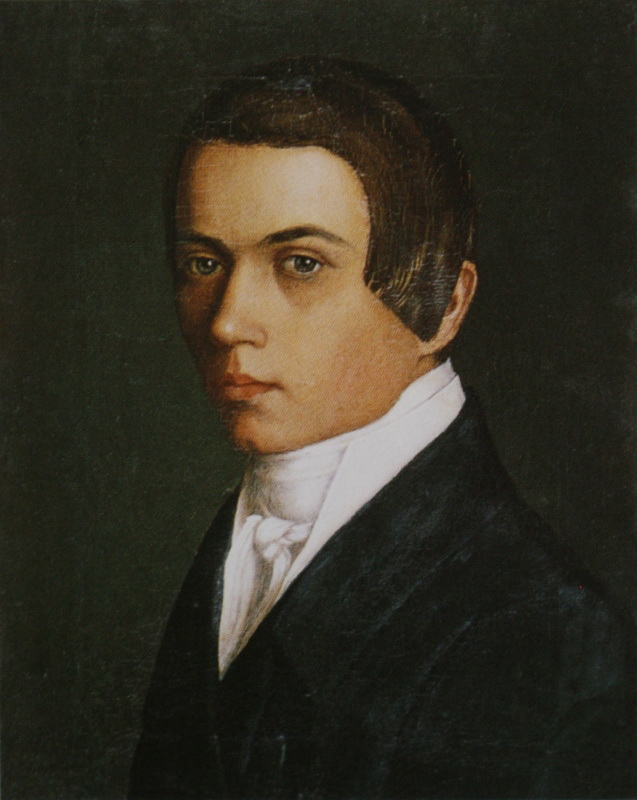
Self-portrait

Grigoriy Vasilyevich Soroka (Russian: Григорий Васильевич Сорока, real surname Vasilyev (Васильев); 27 November [O.S. 15 November] 1823—22 April [O.S. 10 April] 1864) was a Russian painter, one of the most notable members of Venetsianov school.

== Life ==
Soroka was born as a serf in Pokrovskoye village (Tver Guberniya), owned by the Milyukov family. In 1842-1847 he studied art from Alexey Venetsianov then he was returned to his owner. In the 1850s-1860s he resided in his home village. He fell in love with his owner's daughter Lydia but was forcibly married to a serf woman. After the emancipation reform of 1861 in Russia, Soroka remained under the serfdom system. He made a formal complaint but it was rejected and he was flogged. Soroka's body was found in the baking room where he had hanged himself. His beloved Lydia poisoned herself soon after.

== Art ==
Though Soroka's surviving output is relatively small and includes no more than 20 undated paintings, Soroka proved himself to be a gifted draughtsman. He also painted several icons for local churches, among them Saviour Not Made by Hands.

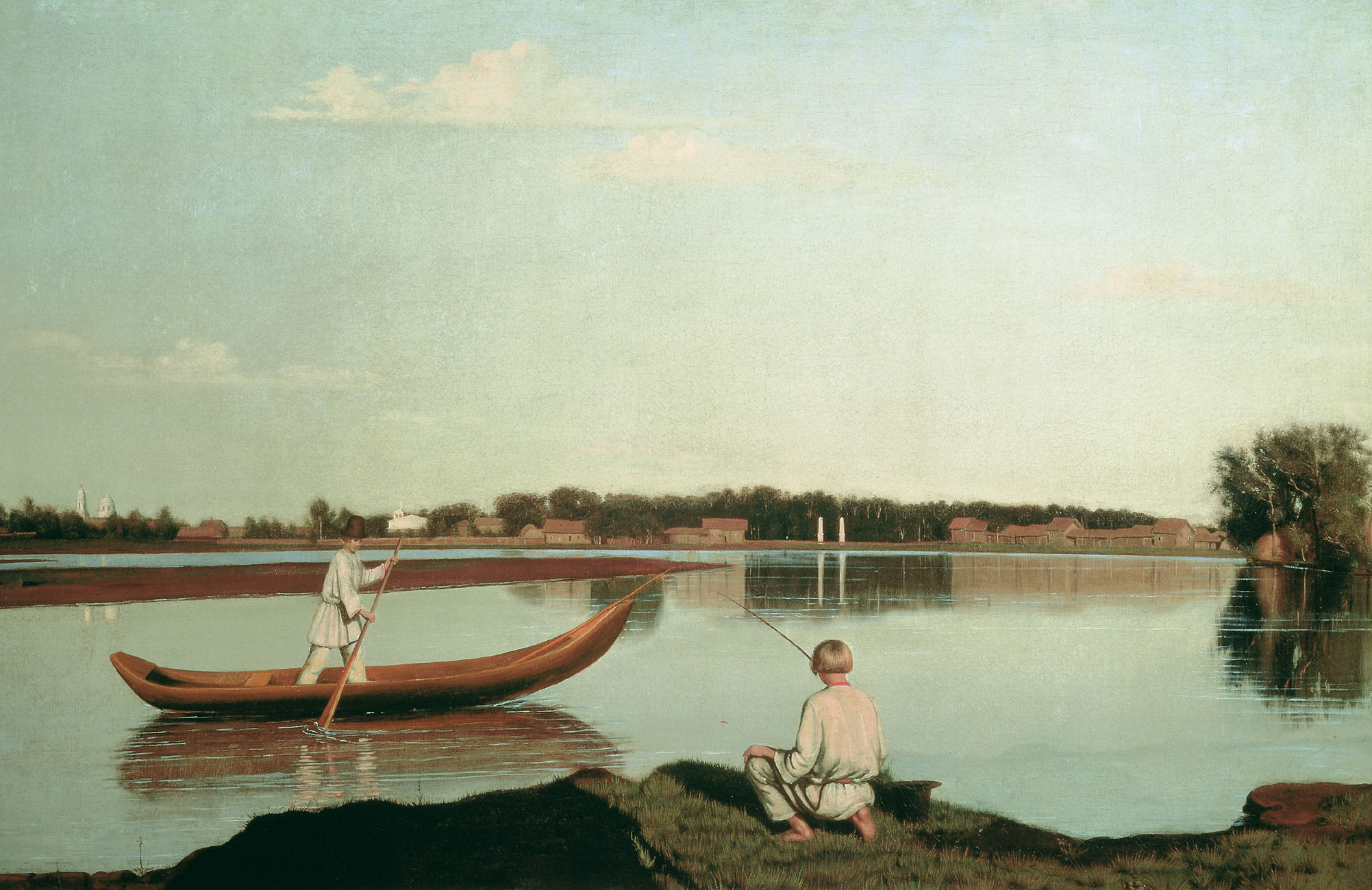
Fishermen

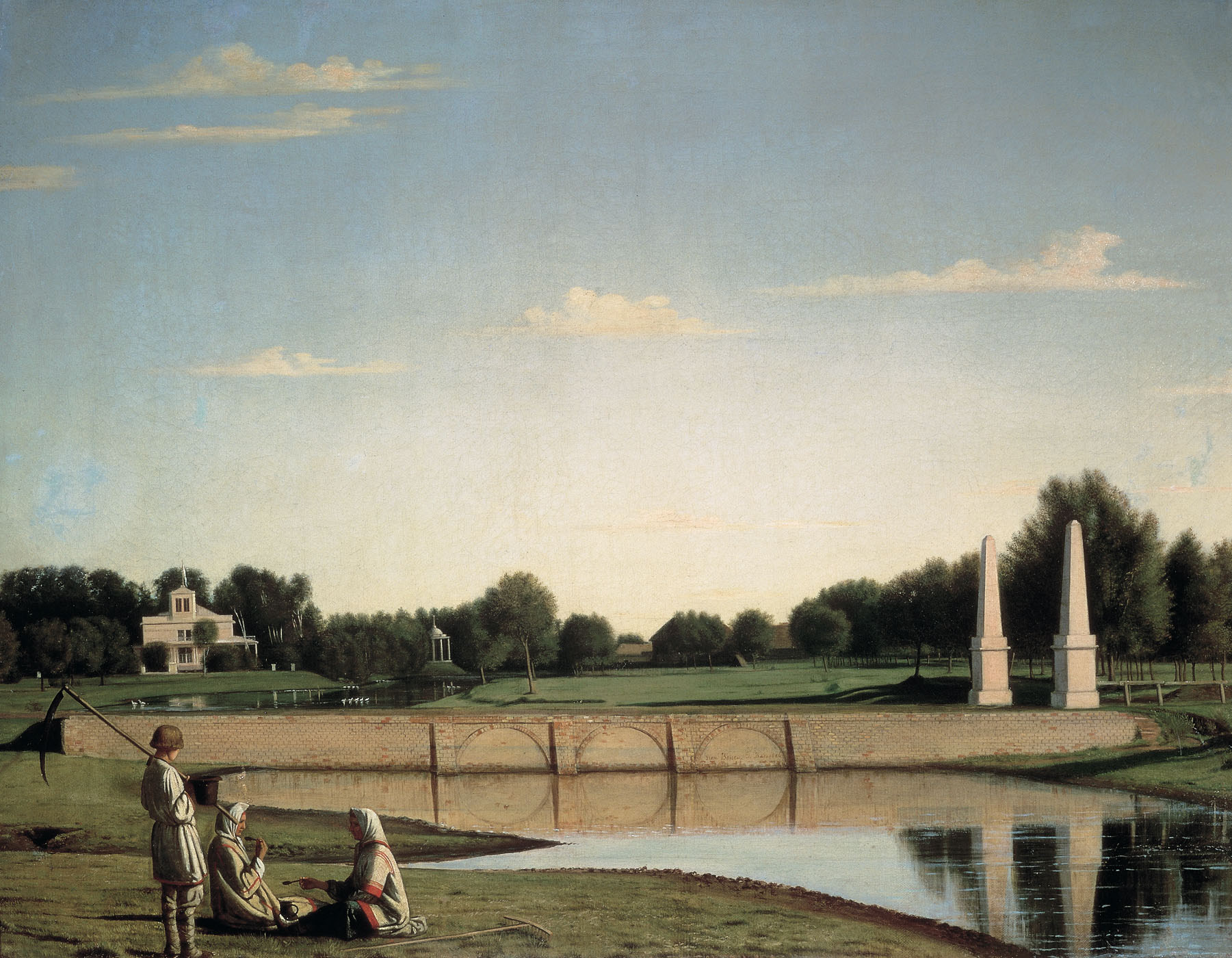
Dam in Spasskoye, Tambov Guberniya

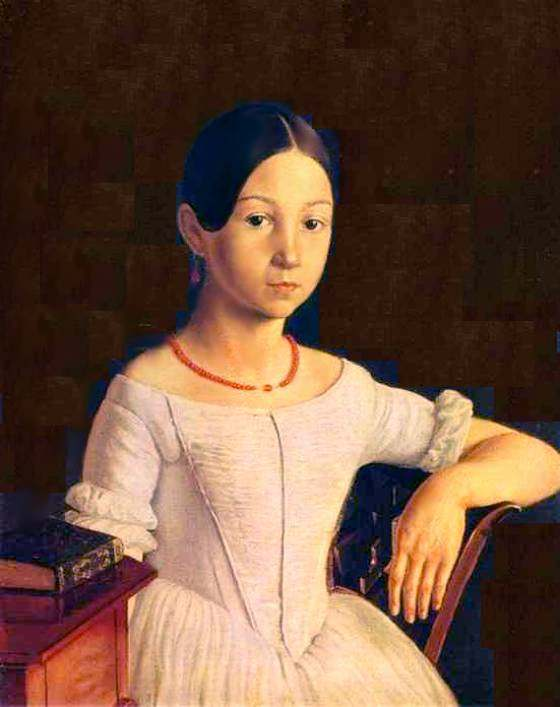
Lydia Milyukov, 1840s

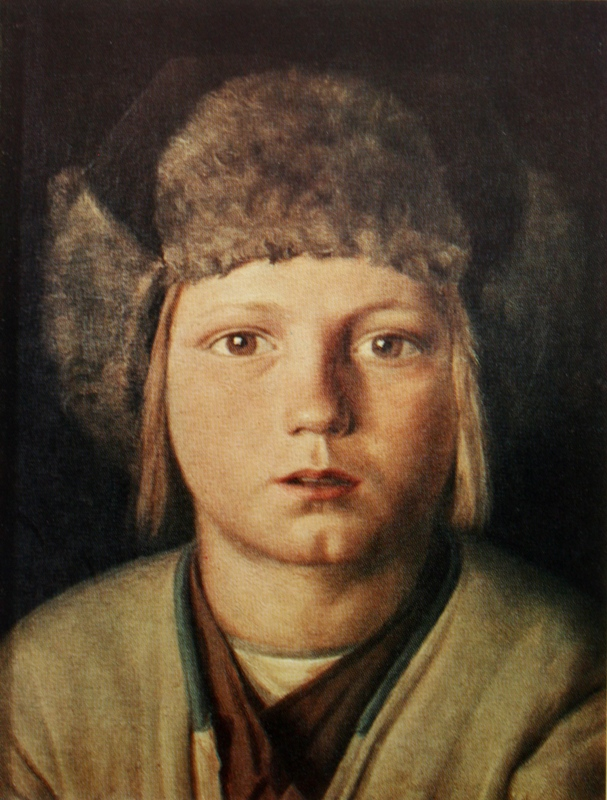
Peasant boy, 1840s

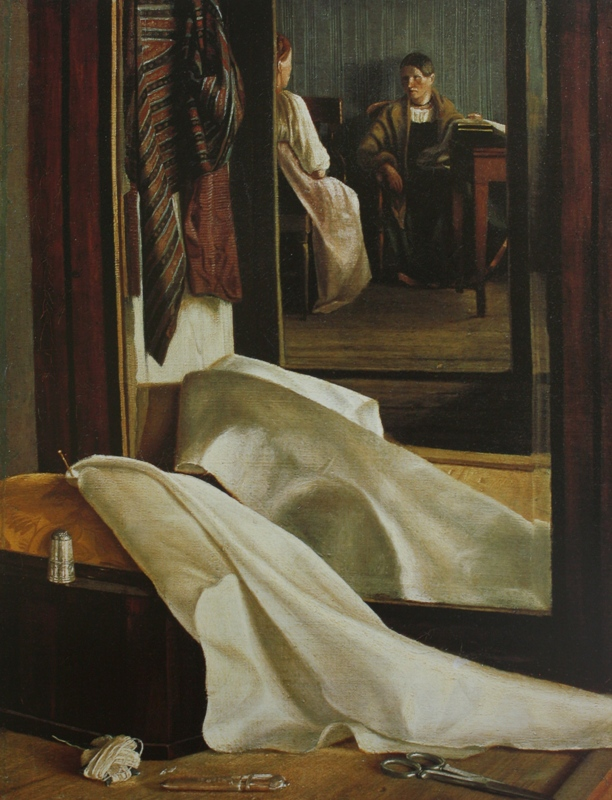
Reflection in a mirror, 1850s
