= Kapiton Zelentsov =

Russian painter

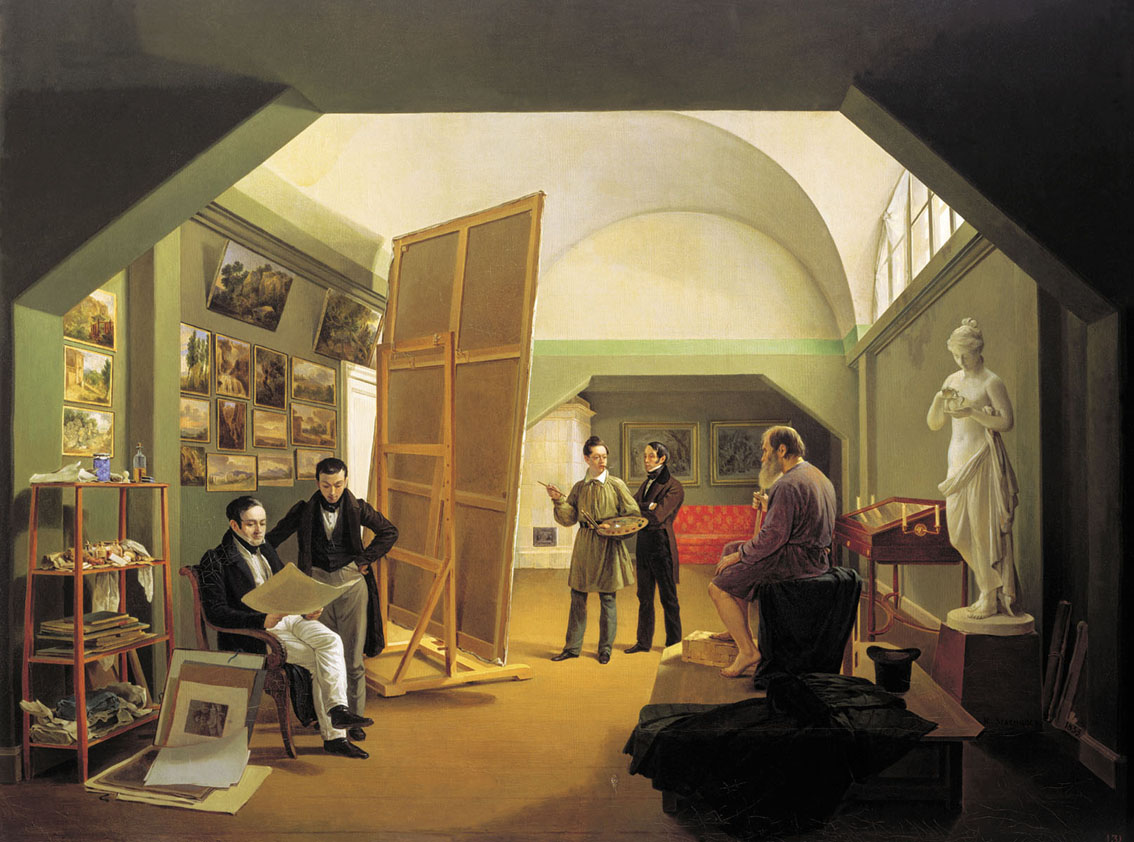
The Studio of Pyotr Basin (1833)

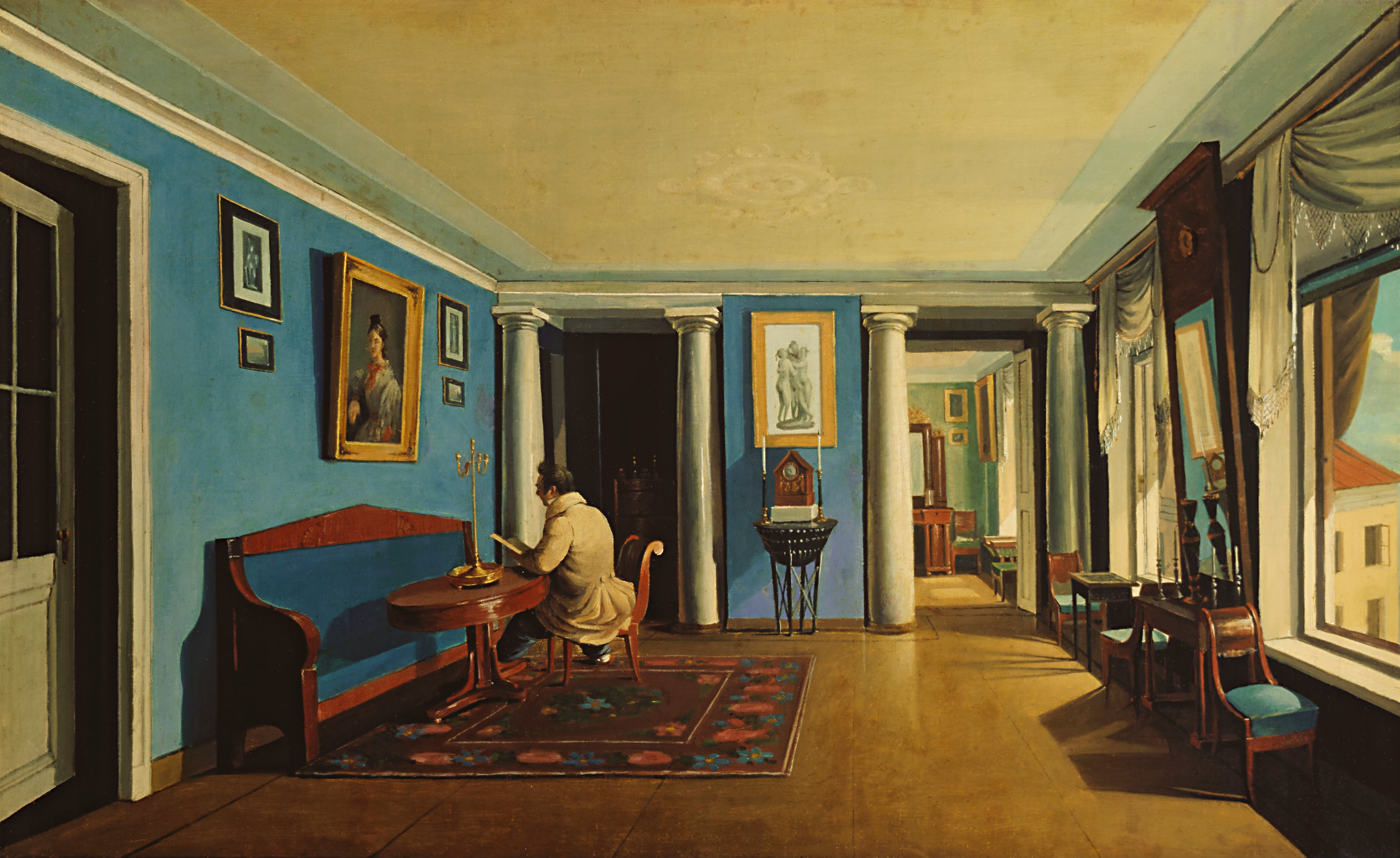
Living Room With Columns on the Mezzanine

Kapiton Alekseyevich Zelentsov (Russian: Капито́н Алексе́евич Зеленцо́в; March 1790 – 15 May 1845) was a Russian painter, lithographer, and illustrator.

== Life ==
Zelentsov was the son of a factory owner and collegiate assessor, and he began taking lessons at the Imperial Academy of Arts in 1809. During the Napoleonic Wars, he drew caricatures and popular patriotic prints while honing his skills by copying the old masters in the Hermitage. It was there that he met and came under the influence of Alexey Venetsianov. Later, he worked for the Ministry of Internal Affairs and was appointed to His Imperial Majesty's Own Chancellery, where he worked from 1814 to 1841, where he achieved the rank of Court Councilor.

In 1817, he was involved in creating The Magic Lamp or a View of St. Petersburg Traders, for which he supplied forty etchings of scenes from everyday life. However, it wasn't until after his father went bankrupt that he took up art as a profession. After 1826, he contributed to exhibitions at the Academy. During the 1830s, many of his paintings and lithographs were used to illustrate the works of Faddei Bulgarin, Alexander Pushkin and Mikhail Zagoskin. In 1833, he was awarded the title "Academician of Perspective Painting" for his work "The Studio of Pyotr Basin". Many of his interior portraits are considered to be among the best of the genre, following Venetsianov's belief that they too constitute "painting from nature". In 1835, he wrote the Entertaining Alphabet Compiled and Drawn by Kapiton Zelentsov. He died in Saint Petersburg.
