= Milyukov =

Milyukov' or Milukov (Russian: Милюков), feminine: Milyukova, Milukova is a Russian surname associated with the Russian noble Milyukov family.

- Antonina Miliukova (1848–1917), Russian woman who was married to Pyotr Ilyich Tchaikovsky
- Aleksandr Milyukov (1816–1897), Russian writer, journalist and literary critic
- Konstantin Milyukov (born 1994), Russian-born figure skater who competed for Belarus
- Pauline Melikoff (1893–1988), Australian princess and philanthropist
- Pavel Milyukov (1859–1943), Russian historian and politician
- Valentin Milyukov (born 1992), Kazakhstani professional ice hockey player
