= Milyukov family =

Russian noble family

The Milyukov family (Russian: Милюков), also spelled Milukoff, Milukov, Melukov, Melukoff, is an old Russian noble family (first recorded in the mid-14th century). Milyukovs were recorded in the ancient nobility books of Moscow, Orlov, Simbirsk, St. Petersburg, Tver, Yaroslavl, and Tula Governorates. In the 16th and 17th centuries, numerous Milyukovs were voivodes, falconers, stolniks (cup bearers), and gentleman of the bedchamber.

== Origins ==
The House of Milyukov stems from a "foreigner" Semyon Melik, who was a voivode, that fought alongside Prince Dmitry Donskoy and died in the Battle of Kulikovo. From him on, his children became Melikoff ("from Melik"), later on the name underwent "Russification" to become Milyukov. Since some early Milyukovs had Turkic names, such as Murza and Sabur, and the fact that Malik (Arabic: ملك) translates as (King), allows to deduct that Semyon Melik was from Azerbaijani nobility. And given the time span of his appearance in Muscovy, most likely from the recently fallen Kingdom of Cilicia.

== Side branches ==
Starovo-Milyukov (Старово-Милюков) is a cadet line founded by Semyon Ioanovich, one of Semyon Melik's grandchildren, nicknamed "Stary" (Russian: Старый; lit. old). Yelizary Tashlykov Starovo-Milyukov was a voivode of Oreshek (1595). Ivan Ionavich was a voivode of Rzhev-Volodimirove (1618). In the 17th century, numerous Starovo-Milyukovs were stolniks and gentlemen of the bedchamber. It seems that the branch became extinct in a male line after the death of Vasily Yakovlevich — lieutenant-governor of Orenburg province. However, the female line still exists in modern-day descendants of the third cadet branch of princes Volkonsky and ancient aristocrats Bibikoffs.

Melyukov (Мелюков) (originally Milyukov) is the second cadet branch, and broke off during the early 1860s (shortly after the abolition of serfdom in the Russian Empire). Like many other northern noblemen, the Milyukovs were seriously affected by the abolition, because serfs, who could take winter jobs in the cities, were much more valuable possessions than often frozen land. The Milyukovs were forced to go into business for themselves or go broke. They started a trading company and made their name as merchants of fine furs, supplying, among others, the Russian Imperial Family and several German ducal houses. As a matter of fact, the Milyukovs were so successful that they owned one of the first commercial steamships in Russia. Later, during the Revolution of 1918, many members participated as members of White Army, this branch altering the spelling of its name to Melyukov to escape prosecution by the Cheka.

== Prominent members of the Milyukov family ==
Milyukov family had numerous notable members throughout the centuries. Below is the list of the most illustrious members of their time.

During the early 16th century, the most prominent one was Mikhail Ioanovich, who was a Grand Falconer and a namestnik of Bely Gorod (1506).

One of the more illustrious Milyukovs in the 17th century was Semyon (d. 1699), the Archbishop of Smolensk, who stringently opposed the rule of Tsarevna Sophia Alekseyevna believing that it is not woman's business to rule and that brothers Peter (later Peter I of Russia) and Ivan (later Ivan V of Russia) should take over.

In the 19th century, Nikolay Petrovich was a very noteworthy nobleman in Tver; his godfather was Alexander I himself. He is mostly famous for owning and later causing the death of Grigory Soroka.

The most famous Milyukov in the 20th century was Pavel Milyukov, founder of the Constitutional Democratic party, a Duma representative, and later the Minister of Foreign Affairs in the Russian Provisional Government, 1917.

== Family estates ==
Ostrovki Manor

The Milyukovs had several estates around Lake Moldino near Tver. The main manor was Poddub'ye, with two other manors, Vsekhsvyatskoye and Ostrovki to the north and south, respectively, belonging to various Milyukovs. According to early 19th century records, Poddub'ye Manor had eight houses and 651 male field serfs attached to it, while Vsekhsvyatskoye had 34 house serfs and 254 male field serfs. Ostrovki Manor had 19 house serfs with an unknown number of field serfs. An interesting fact is that the House of Smirnoff (of Smirnoff Vodka fame) had a family manor right across the lake from Poddub'ye and, just like the Melyukov branch mentioned above, had to start in business shortly after the abolition of serfdom.

== See also ==
- Milyukov (surname)
