= Ivan Belyayev =

Ivan Belyayev may refer to:

- Ivan Belyayev (runner) (born 1935), Soviet athlete who competed in steeplechase
- Ivan Belyayev (footballer) (born 1986), Russian footballer
- Juan Belaieff (Ivan Belyayev; 1875–1957), Russian and Paraguayan cartographer and soldier
