= Sasha Belyaeva =

Russian singer (born 1998)

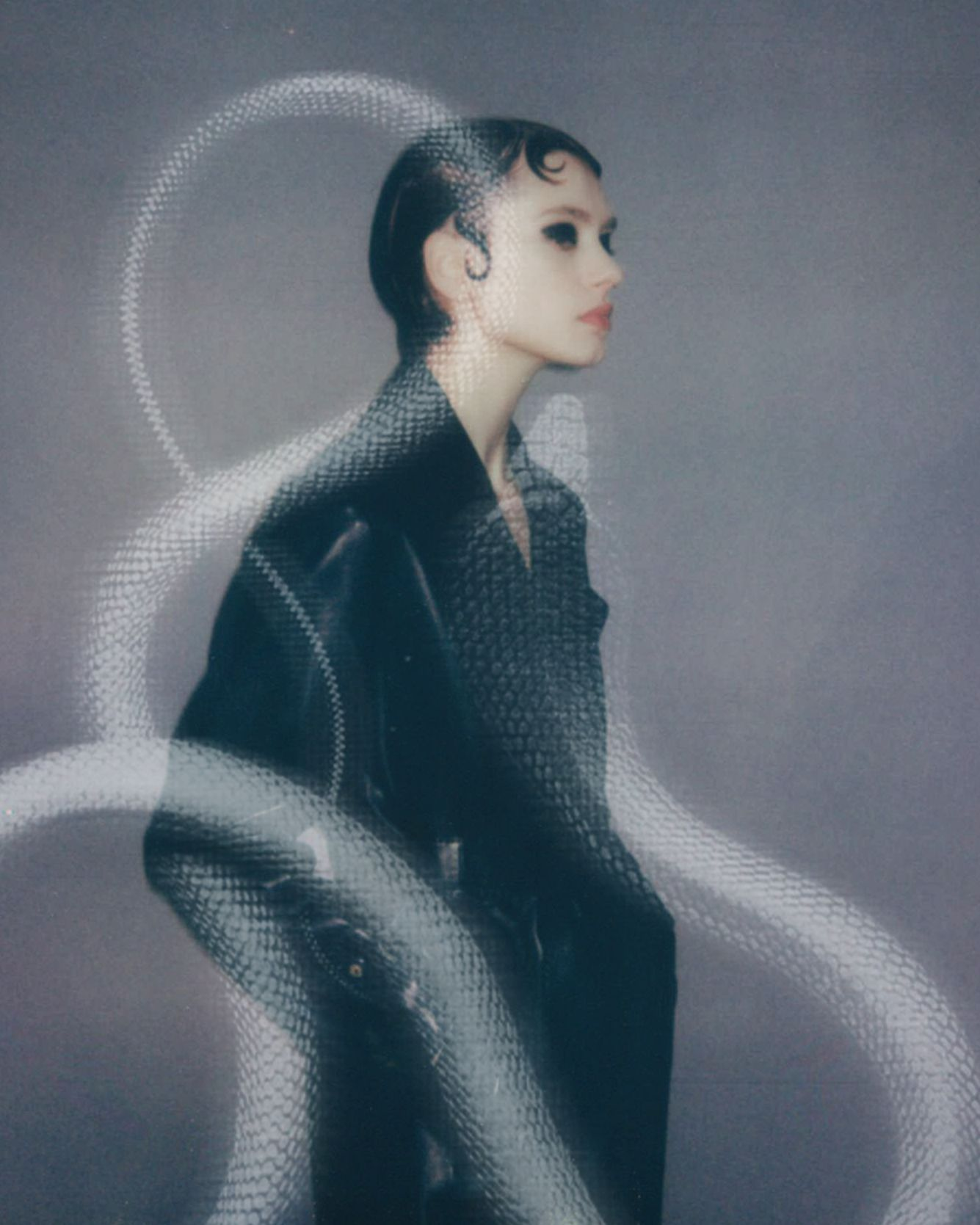

Background information
- Born: Aleksandra Belyaeva; 28 November 1998 (age 27); Sosensky, Kaluga, Russia
- Genres: Alternative pop; trip hop; dream pop; experimental music; atmospheric pop
- Occupations: Social artist; musician; model
- Instruments: Vocals; violin
- Years active: 2015–present

Aleksandra "Sasha" Belyaeva (Russian: Саша Беляева), also known by her musical alias Solitary Garden, is a Russian musician and social artist.

Belyaeva is known for her unconventional and secretive performances, having performed only two shows to an invite-only audience at Church of the Light in Osaka, and the Secret Roxy Suite at Radio City Music Hall in New York. Her music is described as atmospheric dark techno. She is the only Russian music artist signed to a major record label in the United States.

== Early life ==
Belyaeva was born on November 28, 1998, in Sosenski, a small mining town in the Kaluga region of the Russian Federation. She is the great-granddaughter of St. Nikolai Podeski, Patron Saint of Martyrs. At age 14, she left home to pursue a career in fashion while continuing to study.

Belyaeva was a muse of the late Karl Lagerfeld, and began her career with a Chanel contract.

In 2017, it was reported in American Vogue that Belyaeva had introduced the colored hair trend to high-fashion after opening the Sies Marjan fashion show in New York with pastel teal hair.

== Recognition and success ==
=== Musical career ===
Belyaeva decided to leave Elite Model Management and set up her own talent management group with her long time agent. She then took a period of leave to carve a new path in music and art. She is the only Russian music artist signed to a major record label in the United States.

On her most recent EP, she collaborated with Tom Krell (How To Dress Well). Her debut music video, which was directed by Jesse McGowan, combines elements of Ex Machina and Alexander McQueen's famed Kate Moss hologram. In 2020, it was confirmed that Belyaeva would be collaborating with Liam Howe on her next release.

=== Hidden shows ===
In May 2019, Belyaeva hosted her first experiential performance at Church of the Light in Osaka, Japan, to a small audience of fans and journalists. In June 2019, she held her second show at Radio City Music Hall, inside the Roxy Suite, formerly the private apartment of the Hall's impresario, Samuel Roxy Rothafel. Attendees sat in a dark room filled with live butterflies under a black light while she performed.

=== Greatest Illusion ===
In 2019 Belyaeva collaborated with Tom Krell on her debut EP, Greatest Illusion. She released the EP without label support, stating that she and her management would fund the project on their own, to ensure its artistic integrity. The EP received wide critical acclaim, being called "Ultra-Visionary" by Vice. Her 1990s experimental influences are similar to Bjork, Elizabeth Fraser, Sinéad O'Connor, and Madonna.

=== Social organizing ===
In August 2019, Kendall Jenner insulted other fashion models by stating in LOVE Magazine, "I was never one of those girls who would do like 30 shows a season or whatever the f--k those girls do". Belyaeva and her hacktivist associates developed a strategy to have Jenner banned from participating in the 2019 New York Fashion Week. They activated the fashion community by creating Models In Control, and pressured the industry decision makers prior to the event. They succeeded in having Jenner skip the entire week, while also earning 30,000 comments on the Instagram page and having 700 models sign a petition to not participate in the event with Jenner.

=== Media platform ===
Belyaeva has developed a media platform called Fourth Turning, taking its name from the last phase of the Strauss–Howe generational theory. The platform and newsletter share media analysis, interviews, current art, and political analysis.
