= Dmitry Belyayev =

Dmitry Belyayev may refer to:

- Dmitry Belyayev (zoologist) (1917–1985), Russian zoologist
- Dmitry Belyaev (artist) (1921–2007), Russian painter
