= Shatalov (crater) =

Crater on the Moon

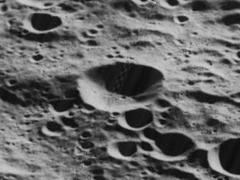
- Oblique Lunar Orbiter 5 image
- Coordinates: 24.3°N 141.5°E
- Diameter: 21 km
- Depth: Unknown
- Colongitude: 220° at sunrise
- Eponym: Vladimir A. Shatalov

Shatalov is a relatively small lunar impact crater on the far side of the Moon. It is located to the west-southwest of the Mare Moscoviense, one of the few lunar maria on the far side. To the east-southeast of Shatalov along the edge of the Mare Moscoviense is the larger crater Belyaev.

This is a bowl-shaped crater with a circular outer rim, a fairly typical appearance for a lunar crater of this size. Attached to the outer rim along the northeastern side is a small, cup-shaped impact crater. The interior of Shatalov is not marked by any impacts of significance.
