= Kiknur =

Kiknur Кикнур
- Urban-type settlement
- Interactive map of Kiknur
- Location of Kiknur Kiknur (Kirov Oblast)
- Coordinates: 57.3046°N 47.2077°E
- Country: Russia
- Federal subject: Kirov Oblast
- Administrative district: Kiknursky District
- Founded: 1555

Population (2010 Census)
  - Total: 4,970
  - Estimate (2025): 3,881 (−21.9%)
- Time zone: UTC+3 (MSK)
- Postal code: 612300
- OKTMO ID: 33616151051

Kiknur (Russian: Кикнур) is an urban locality (an urban-type settlement) in Kiknursky District of Kirov Oblast, Russia. Population: 4,970 (2010 census); 5,410 (2002 census); 6,654 (1989 Soviet census).
