= Pavel Belyayev =

Soviet cosmonaut (1925–1970)

- Павел Беляев
- Belyayev in 1965
- Born: Pavel Ivanovich Belyayev; 26 June 1925; Chelishchevo, Russian SFSR, Soviet Union
- Died: 10 January 1970 (aged 44); Moscow, Russian SFSR, Soviet Union
- Occupation: Fighter pilot
- Awards: Hero of the Soviet Union; Order of Lenin; Order of the Red Star
- Space career

Cosmonaut
- Time in space: 1d 02h 02m
- Selection: Air Force Group 1
- Missions: Voskhod 2

Pavel Ivanovich Belyayev (Russian: Павел Иванович Беляев; 26 June 1925 – 10 January 1970) was a Soviet cosmonaut who commanded the historic 1965 Voskhod 2 space mission which saw the first space walk. He had been a fighter pilot with extensive experience in piloting different types of aircraft, and was the first commander of the cosmonaut corps.

== Early life ==
Pavel Belyayev was one of 6 children and was known as Pasha to his family and friends. He was born on 26 June 1925, in Chelishchevo, now Babushkinsky District, Vologda Oblast, Russia. In 1932 his family moved to the nearby village of Minkovo. His father was a physician's assistant and his mother worked on a collective farm. Belyayev began his schooling at the age of 7 in 1932. Physics and geography were his favourite subjects. As a boy he enjoyed playing hockey and hunting. Just before his 13th birthday the family moved to Kamensk-Uralsky region. He continued his education at the Gorkogo secondary school.

In 1942, Belyayev took on temporary work as a turner in a factory and later became a check operator in the Sinarsk pipes factory in support of the war effort. He applied to the special air force school in Sverdlovsk but failed to gain admission. He then attempted to join a fighting ski unit as a volunteer, but was again rejected because he was too young. In 1943, just prior to turning 18, he was called up. He then entered the 3rd Sarapul School where he began training as a naval pilot. He graduated in 1944 and then moved to the Stalin Naval Air School.

== Air Force career ==
Belyayev graduated as a military pilot in 1945 with the rank of junior lieutenant. The war had ended in the west, so Belyayev was sent to defend Russia's eastern regions. He flew Yakovlev, Lavochkin and MiG fighters in the final days of the war against the Japanese, August 1945.

Belyayev remained in the East for the next decade, being stationed largely in Siberia. He was promoted to lieutenant in 1947. In 1950 he was promoted to senior lieutenant. During this time he flew seven different aircraft types and came to be considered one of the Soviet Union's most gifted commander pilots. He was awarded the Distinguished Combat service medal in 1953. In 1954 he was promoted to captain. While he remained fond of hunting, he also enjoyed more academic pursuits in his downtime including reading and writing poetry and playing the piano and accordion. In 1956 Belyayev succeeded in gaining entry into advanced studies at the Red Banner Air Force Academy. He graduated in 1959 as military pilot second class and with the rank of major.

== Cosmonaut selection ==
During Belyayev's final studies at the Red banner Air Force Academy he had been interviewed and tested for possible inclusion in the space program. The selectors were impressed by his ability to withstand high g-Forces. Belyayev was sent to Air Squadron 661 4th IAD of the Black Sea Fleet. A month later he was appointed commander of the regiment's 241st squadron. By the time he was finally selected he had logged over 1,000 hours flight time in both piston and jet aircraft and had also completed approximately 40 parachute jumps. Belyayev reported for assignment at the newly formed TsPK (cosmonaut training centre) on 25 March 1960. At 34, he was the oldest candidate accepted into the program. As a major he was the highest ranking candidate and the only one to have seen active service in World War II. Because of his senior rank, Belyayev became the first commander of the cosmonaut corps. Belyayev and Vladimir Komarov (2 years Belyayev's junior) were the only candidates to have Air Force Academy training. Yuri Gagarin nicknamed the two senior officers "The Professors"

In August 1960, Belyayev fractured his lower leg just above the ankle in parachute training, an accident that delayed his progress by approximately 12 months and excluded him from any early space flights. Due to the severity of the injury, it seemed unlikely that Belyayev would be readmitted to the program, but he worked constantly to recover and regain his fitness. After a year's absence he passed his medical and returned to training.

== Space flight ==
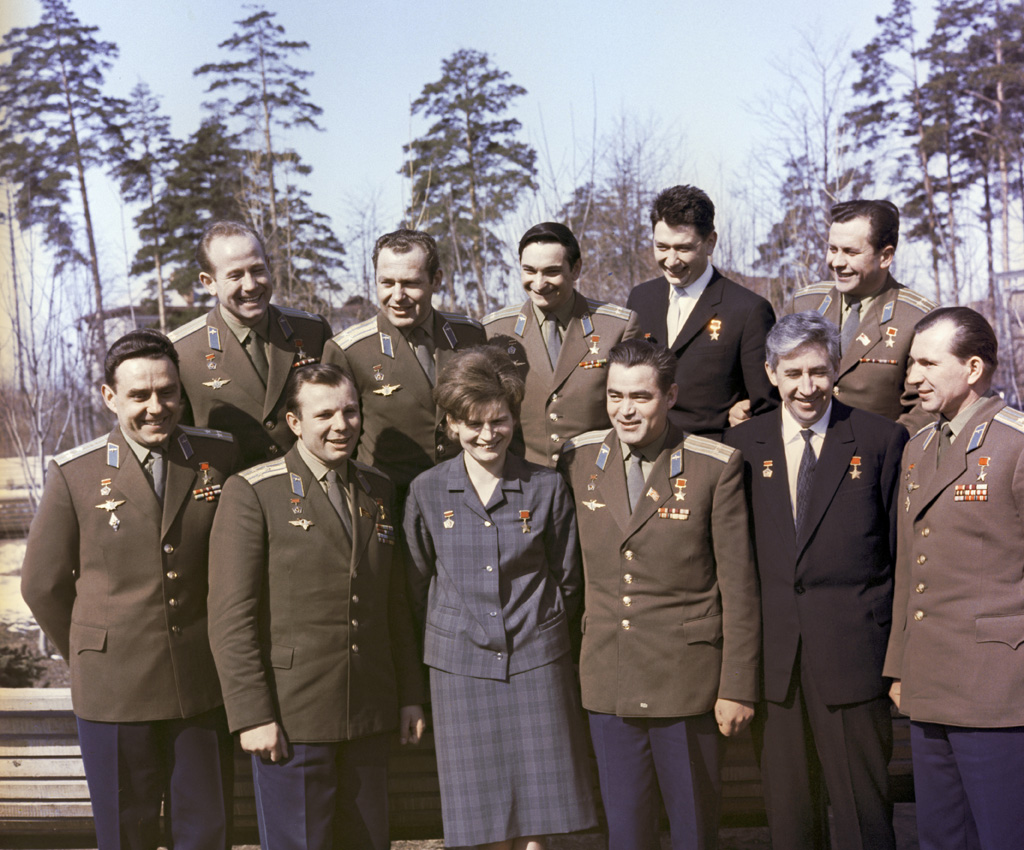
Soviet cosmonauts (front row, from left): Vladimir Komarov (Voskhod 1), Yuri Gagarin (Vostok 1), Valentina Tereshkova (Vostok 6), Andriyan Nikolayev (Vostok 3), Konstantin Feoktistov (Voskhod 1), Pavel Belyayev (Voskhod 2), second row: Alexey Leonov (Voskhod 2), Gherman Titov (Vostok 2), Valery Bykovsky (Vostok 5), Boris Yegorov (Voskhod 1), and Pavel Popovich (Vostok 4).

After the success of the first Voskhod mission in 1964, a second more technically demanding mission was planned for 1965. Its primary aim was to have a cosmonaut leave the capsule and "space-walk". Belyayev was confirmed as prime crew commander of Voskhod 2 just 3 days prior to launch. There had been concern about his mission fitness following a poor performance in the altitude chamber testing 2 months before. It was his crewman Alexei Leonov who finally reported that "Those responsible for the malfunction were the factory specialists supporting the equipment", and that Belyayev had successfully corrected the fault himself, thereby also taking responsibility for the problem himself. Leonov, who had been chosen to perform the space walk described how he preferred to have Belyayev as his mission commander over Khrunov. "I lobbied hard for Pasha, whom I thought more capable than Khrunov. I had worked with him more; I trusted him."

=== Voskhod 2 ===
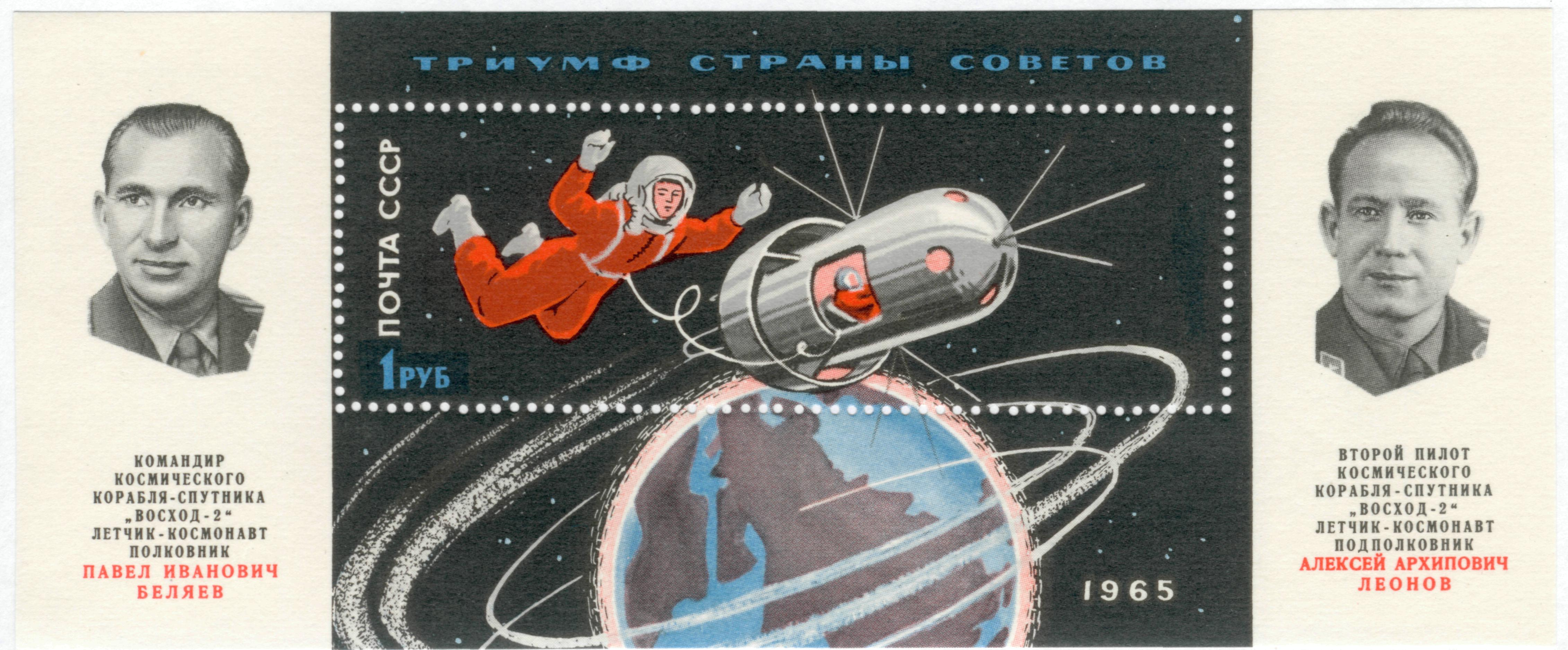
Soviet stamp "The Triumph of the Soviet Union. Voskhod-2 spacecraft." Note that the craft depicted bears no resemblance to the real Voskhod capsules, and omits the external airlock.

Voskhod 2 launched with Belyayev and Leonov on board on 18 March 1965. Belyayev's call sign was Diamond (Russian: Алмаз) and his designation as mission commander was 1.

After Leonov successfully performed the first space walk, Belyayev prepared to return to Earth. Belyayev had to perform a manual reentry when the automatic reentry system failed. This required Belyayev to use the equipped Vzor navigation device to orient the capsule. Due to the cramped conditions inside the capsule and its poor design, Belyayev had to lie across the seats to use the Vzor while Leonov held him in place. Belyayev asked Leonov to check the craft's attitude, a move which caused the craft to overshoot its intended landing area by approximately 2,000 kilometres (1,200 mi) because of the extra time this took. Upon landing Belyayev had to force open the hatch after the explosive bolts failed to open it. Belyayev then had to pull Leonov, whose legs had become jammed under the TV screen console, out of the capsule. After spending a night back inside the capsule in extremely cold conditions, the crew were met by an advance rescue party the following morning. It took another day to clear a spot in the forest for a rescue helicopter to land 9 kilometres (5.6 mi) from the landing site.

After the success of the mission Belyayev and Leonov were awarded the Hero of the Soviet Union medal, given 15,000 rubles, a Volga car and 45 days leave.

Apollo 15 commander, astronaut David Scott recalled meeting Belyayev at the 1967 Paris Air Show, when he and other NASA representatives visited the Russian pavilion. "He was really gracious… Belyayev was a very positive, thoughtful guy, a real leader; I liked him a lot." On a reciprocal visit to the American pavilion, Belyayev disclosed that he had been "the first cosmonaut to bring his mission back to Earth on manual control".

He was originally to fly the Vostok 8 mission into Earth's Van Allen radiation belt, but this was cancelled.

== Personal life ==
In 1948, he married Tatyana Filippovna Prikazchikova. They had two daughters; Irina and Ludmila.

== Death and legacy ==
Belyayev died five years after the Voskhod 2 mission in 1970 from peritonitis that resulted from an operation on a stomach ulcer. He is buried in the Novodevichy Cemetery in Moscow.

Belyayev has been commemorated with other prominent figures from the early Russian space program with a bust on Cosmonauts Alley in Moscow. Pavel Belyayev was awarded the Hero of the Soviet Union (23 March 1965), Order of Lenin, Order of the Red Star, numerous medals and foreign orders. He also bore the title of the Hero of Socialist Labor of Bulgaria, Hero of Vietnam, and Hero of Mongolia.

His name appears on the plaque accompanying the Fallen Astronaut sculpture placed on the Moon on 1 August 1971 by the crew of Apollo 15.

Accounts of Belyayev's life and space career appear in the 2003 book Fallen Astronauts and the 2007 book Into That Silent Sea, both by Colin Burgess. Belyayev is also used as a character in Judith and Garfield Reeves-Stevens 2005 novel, Freefall, in which he is the first person to land on the Moon, hours before Apollo 11.

Pavel Belyayev appeared on various stamps. In 1965, he appeared on stamps from the Soviet Union, Cuba, Bulgaria, East Germany, and Hungary. In 1966, he appeared on stamps from Bulgaria, Mali, and Mauritania.

A crater on the far side of the Moon was named after Belyayev by the IAU in 1970.

A minor planet discovered in 1969 by Soviet astronomer Lyudmila Chernykh is named 2030 Belyaev after him.

Konstantin Khabensky portrayed Belyayev in the 2017 Russian film The Age of Pioneers, a dramatisation of the Voskhod 2 mission. Leonov acted as creative consultant and the film is dedicated to Belyayev.

== Honors and awards ==
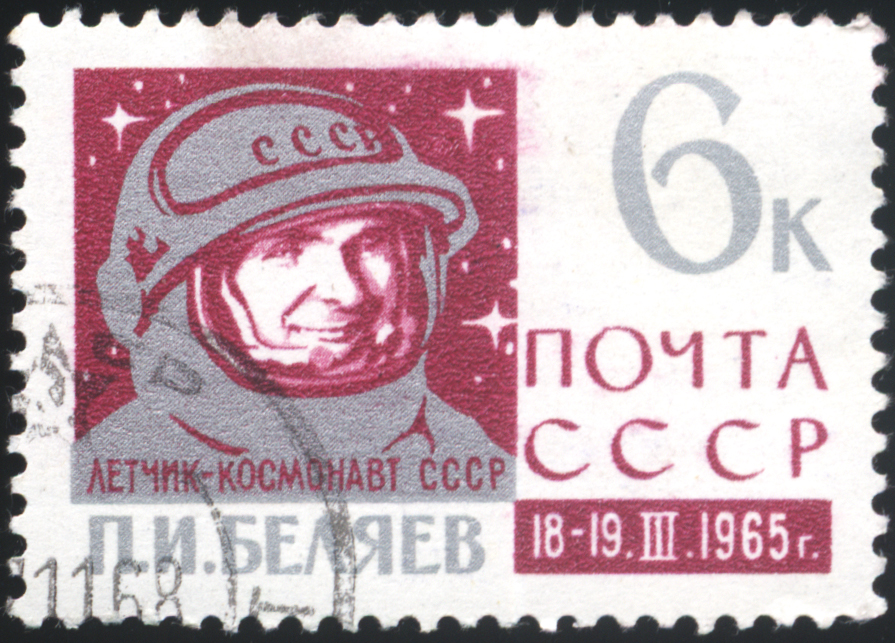
Pavel Belyayev on Soviet Union 1965 Stamp 6 kopeks

- Hero of the Soviet Union Medal "Gold Star" (23 March 1965)
- Title Pilot-Cosmonaut of the USSR
- Order of Lenin (23 March 1965)
- Order of the Red Star (17 June 1961)
- Medal for Combat Service (11 November 1953)
- Medal "For the Victory over Germany in the Great Patriotic War 1941–1945" (9 May 1945)
- Medal "For the Victory over Japan" (30 September 1945)
- Medal "For Valiant Labour in the Great Patriotic War 1941–1945" (25 May 1965)
- Medal "For Development of the Virgin Lands" (19 March 1965)
- Hero of Socialist Labour (Bulgaria, 1965)
- Order of Georgi Dimitrov (Bulgaria, 1965)
- Hero of Labour (Vietnam, 1965)
- Hero of Mongolia
- Order of Sukhbaatar (Mongolia, 1967).
- Order of Karl Marx (East Germany, 1965).
- Order of the Syrian Arab Republic with diamond.
- Jubilee Medal "Twenty Years of Victory in the Great Patriotic War 1941–1945"
- Jubilee Medal "30 Years of the Soviet Army and Navy"
- Jubilee Medal "40 Years of the Armed Forces of the USSR"
- Medal "For Impeccable Service" 1st and 2nd class
