= Nina Belyaeva =

Russian public policy researcher and professor

- Born: Nina Yurievna Belyaeva; 1957 (age 68–69); Moscow, Soviet Union
- Education: Moscow State University
- Occupations: Scientist, Political and Social Activist
- Known for: Head of Public Policy department HSE 2000 - 2022
- Website: scholar.google.ru/citations?user=0idzpaMAAAAJ&hl=ru

Nina Yurievna Belyaeva (Russian: Нина Юрьевна Беляева) is a Russian public policy researcher, PhD, professor and head of the Public Policy Department. at National Research University Higher School of Economics (NRU HSE), Moscow 2000 - 2022, Russia, Academic Supervisor of the International Master's Program "Political Analysis and Public Policy" with a specialization in "Human Rights and Democratic Governance" (2006-2022), Russia. Member of Russian Political Science Association.

== Biography ==
Nina Belyaeva was born in 1957.

In 1981 Nina Belyaeva had graduated summa cum laude from the Faculty of Law of Moscow State University (MSU). In 1986 she had passed PhD in Law defense with thesis topic: “Legal groundwork for NGO’s political activities in USSR” at Institute of State and Law (ISL) of the USSR Academy of Sciences. Nina Y. Belyaeva completed an internship of UNESCO in School of Law of University of London in 1987 and in 1991 she had finished her internship at Institute for Policy Studies in the Johns Hopkins University. In 1992 Nina Y. Belyaeva worked in Center for Strategic & International Studies (USA) as visiting fellow. Since 1993 she worked as a senior visiting fellow at United States Institute of Peace

During her scientist career, Nina Belyaeva taught courses on political science and law in universities of Georgetown, Colorado, Baltimore (USA), Salzburg (Austria), Cape Town (South Africa); particularly, courses in English on Russian political and legal reform, on the development of new social and political movements, on comparative constitutional law etc. Since 2000 Nina Belyaeva works in Higher School of Economics. She is a member of the HSE Scientific Council, head of the Public Policy Department and academic head of the Master program “Political Analysis and Public Policy”, which is the only English-language program on Public Policy in Russia.

At loose hours, Nina Belyaeva goes in mountain climbing, theater and choreography.

== Academic interests and career ==
The scope of Nina Belyaeva's professional research interests include the legal basis for the creation and functioning of political institutions; public sphere and public policies; civil society and the state; attitude of authorities and society, including legal regulation of different forms of dialogue and cooperation (the creation of the Public Chamber of advisory committees, conducting civic forums, civil debate, civil mandates and civilian expertise); civic participation

== Publications ==
- Nina Belyaeva, Brad Roberts, Walter Laqueur (Foreword by). After perestroika: democracy in the Soviet Union. Center for Strategic and International Studies (Washington, D.C.). Significant issues series, 1991;
- Nina Belyaeva. Russian democracy: crisis as progress. Washington quarterly, 16(2) Spring 1993;
- Nina Belyaeva (ed.). Russian and American think tanks : an initial survey. Kennan Institute for Advanced Russian Studies. Washington, D.C. 1994;
- Nina Belyaeva (ed.). Public Policy in Contemporary Russia: Actors and Institutions. (HSE, 2006);
- Nina Belyaeva (ed.). Russian Constitutional Development: Strategies For The New Institutional Design (HSE, 2007);
- Anastasia Novokreshchenova, Maria Shabanova, Dmitry Zaytsev and Nina Belyaeva. Linguistic processing in lattice-based taxonomy construction // CLA 2010: Proceedings of the 7th International Conference on Concept Lattices and Their Applications, University of Sevilla, (Sevilla, Spain, 2010);
- Nina Belyaeva. Development of the Concept of a Public Policy: Attention to "Motive Forces" and Operating Actors / Polis. 2011. Т. 123. № 3. (p. 72-87);
- Nina Belyaeva. Liliana Proskuryakova.Civil Society Diamond. CIVICUS Civil Society Index – Shortened Assessment Tool. Report for the Russian Federation. Interlegal. 2008;
- Nina Belyaeva, Giliberto Capano. Governing Modern Research University: Between Academic Freedom and Managerial Constrains / Russia and the Council of Europe: Topics for Common Agenda. A Look from Norway. Academic Papers of 10th International Session of the HSE Russian - European Centre for Multidisciplinary Research, Oslo, 1–8 August 2010. Moscow. INTELCORP. 2011 (p. 12 – 30);
- N.Y. Belyaeva. Analysts: “Consultants” or “Independent Policy Actors” // Politicka Misao, 2011. Т. 48. № 5;
- Nina Belyaeva (ed.). Analytical Communities in Public Policy: Global Phenomenon and the Russian Practices / ROSSPEN. 2012;
- Nina Belyaeva, Nikita Zagladin. Global Civil Identity: From Ethical Imperatives to Global Institutes/ Political Identity and Policy of Identity. ROSSPEN. 2012;
- Nina Belyaeva. Double National-Political Identity / Political Identity and Policy of Identity. ROSSPEN. 2012;
- Nina Belyaeva. Civil associations in Public Policy: Forms of Participation in Contemporary Russia / XII International Scientific Conference on Problems of Economy and Society Development. The Book 1 / HSE.2012 (p. 302-310).

Zaytsev D. G., Belyaeva N. Y. Determinants of the Policy Impact of Analytical Communities in Russian Regions: Cases of Karelia, Tatarstan and Saratov // Central European Journal of Public Policy. 2017. Vol. 11. No. 2. P. 23-42 Belyaeva N. Y. Citizen Plenums in Bosnia Protests: Creating a Post-Ethnic Identity, in: Non-western social movements and participatory democracy: Protest in the age of transnationalism / Ed. by E. Arbatli, D. Rosenberg. Switzerland : Springer, 2017. P. 115-138. Belyaeva N. Y. The Dynamic Nature of Policy Capacity: Internet Policy in Italy, Belarus and Russia, in: Policy Capacity and Governance. Assessing Governmental Competences and Capabilities in Theory and Practice. Springer, 2018. Ch. 18. P. 411-439. Belyaeva N. Y. at al (2023). Narrative strategies in a nondemocratic setting: Moscow’s urban policy debates // Policy Studies Journal 51(1), 79-100. https://doi.org/10.1111/psj.12445
