= Orlov, Alexeyevsky District, Belgorod Oblast =

Orlov Орлов
- Khutor
- Location within Belgorod Oblast Location within Russia
- Coordinates: 50°32′N 38°41′E
- Country: Russia
- Region: Belgorod Oblast
- District: Alexeyevsky District
- Time zone: UTC+3:00

Orlov (Russian: Орлов) is a rural locality (a khutor) in Alexeyevsky District, Belgorod Oblast, Russia. The population was 7 as of 2010. There is 1 street.

== Geography ==
Orlov is located 13 km south of Alexeyevka (the district's administrative centre) by road. Seroshtanov is the nearest rural locality.
