= Belyaev (crater) =

Crater on the Moon

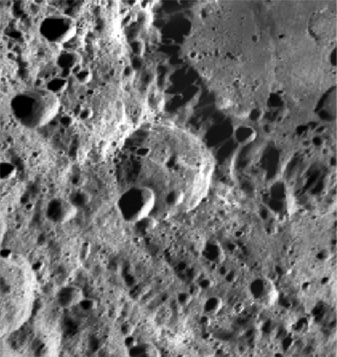
- LRO WAC image
- Coordinates: 23.3°N 143.5°W
- Diameter: 55.90 km (34.73 mi)
- Depth: Unknown
- Colongitude: 218° at sunrise
- Eponym: Pavel I. Belyaev

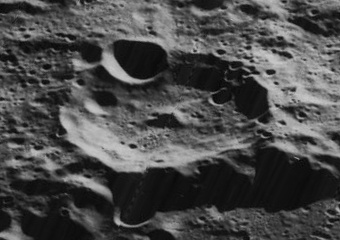
Oblique Lunar Orbiter 5 image

Belyaev is a lunar impact crater that is attached to the outer southwestern edge of the Mare Moscoviense, on the far side of the Moon. To the west-northwest is the small crater Shatalov. Belyaev is a worn formation with a small crater pair overlaying the southern rim, and several smaller craters across the relatively irregular interior.

This crater is named after Soviet cosmonaut Pavel I. Belyaev (1925–1970). Its designation was officially adopted by the International Astronomical Union in 1970.

== Satellite craters ==
By convention these features are identified on lunar maps by placing the letter on the side of the crater midpoint that is closest to Belyaev.

Belyaev	Latitude	Longitude	Diameter
Q	20.6° N	139.4° E	50 km
