= Vladimir Viktorovich Shkatelov =

Russian chemist

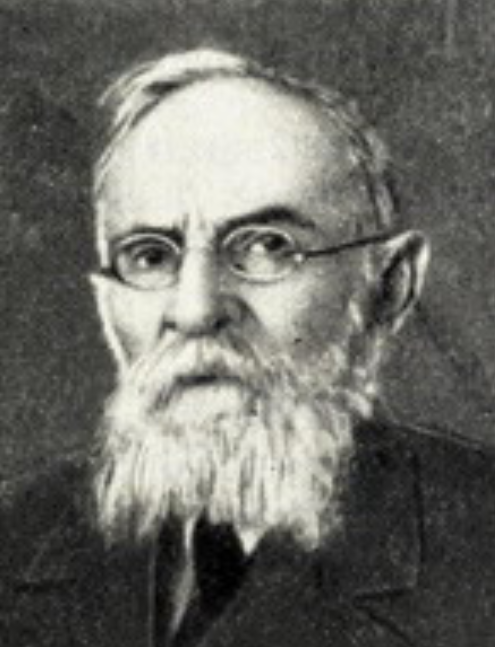
- Born: 05.05.1861; Saint Petersburg, Russian Empire
- Died: 07.10.1940; Minsk, USSR
- Citizenship: Russian Empire, USSR
- Education: Imperial Moscow Technical School
- Known for: Founder of forest chemistry in Belarus
- Partner: Viktor Dmitrievich Shkatelov
- Awards: Distinguished Scientist of Belarus (1938)
- Scientific career
- Fields: Chemistry
- Workplaces: Moscow-Brest Railway, Petrovsko-Razumovskaya Agricultural Academy, Novo-Aleksandriya Institute of Agriculture and Forestry, Belarusian State Institute of Agriculture and Forestry, Forest Technology Department of the Central Forest Experimental Station of Belarus, Institute of Chemistry of the Academy of Science of the Byelorussian SSR, Belarusian Forestry Technical Institute
- Doctoral advisor: Rudnev, Vladimir Matveevich
- Notable students: Kirsanov, Alexander Trofimovich

Vladimir Viktorovich Shkatelov (1861, Saint Petersburg — 1940, Minsk) was a Russian and Soviet chemical technologist and was the founder of forest chemistry in Belarus. He held a Doctor of Chemical Sciences degree, was an Academician of the National Academy of Sciences of BSSR (NAS BSSR) (1929), and was honored as a Distinguished Scientist of BSSR (1938). Shkatelov authored over 60 scientific works on forest and agricultural technology. He is known for his leadership in pioneering industrial experiments in tapping deciduous trees and directing research on wood hydrolysis. He was a key figure in establishing the tapping and rosin-turpentine industry in the USSR. Among the first researchers to identify the superior quality of Russian turpentine. Shkatelov also developed innovative methods for processing resin and analyzed the chemical composition of resins

== Biography ==
Vladimir Viktorovich Shkatelov was born in St. Petersburg on 23.4.1861. into the family of a state official. His father, Viktor Dmitrievich Shkatelov (1822 — 23.06.1870) was a Privy State Councillor serving in the Ministry of Finance of the Russian Empire.

Shkatelov received his secondary education at the Second Classical and later the First Classical Gymnasium in St. Petersburg.In 1878, he entered the Imperial Moscow Technical School, graduating in 1884 with a specialization in chemical engineering and earning the title of engineer-technologist.

In 1884, Shkatelov fulfilled his military service obligations as a first-class volunteer but was soon discharged into the reserves. He then joined the Moscow-Brest Railway as a laboratory assistant, conducting research on railway materials until the end of 1893.

On November 9, 1886, he was appointed an assistant at the Petrovsky-Razumovsky Agricultural Academy under Professor Vladimir Rudnev. Under Rudnev's mentorship, Shkatelov worked on agricultural and forest technology while continuing his work on the railway.

In 1894, Shkatelov began his teaching career at the Novo-Alexandria Institute of Agriculture and Forestry as an adjunct professor in agricultural and forest technology. He also lectured on organic, inorganic, and agronomic chemistry. In 1896, he was promoted to full professor in the same field and, in 1898, established a wood pyrolysis plant for student practical training.

In July 1923, he moved to Minsk at the invitation of his former student, Alexander Kirzanov, who had become the rector of the newly established Belarusian State Institute of Agriculture and Forestry. Shkatelov contributed to the institute's development and built a gas plant for educational purposes.

Shkatelov also served as director of the Novo-Alexandria Institute, managed its technical facilities, and headed its chemical laboratory. In 1926, he was appointed head of the newly created Forest Technology Department at the Central Forest Experimental Station of Belarus.

He actively participated in Mendeleev Congresses and attended refrigeration congresses in Paris and Moscow.

In 1929, Shkatelov was elected an academician of the NAS BSSR. In 1930, he became the director of the Institute of Chemistry of the NAS BSSR, chaired the Department of Chemistry at the Belarusian Forest Engineering Institute in Gomel, and, starting in 1938, led the Forest Chemistry Laboratory at the Institute of Chemistry of the NAS BSSR

== Scientific Research ==
Vladimir Viktorovich Shkatelov, in his dissertation "On the Chemical Composition of Resins". studied the chemical properties of resins, with a particular focus on Russian turpentine and rosin. This work earned him the title of Engineer-Technologist, equivalent to a modern Doctor of Chemical Sciences. Dmitri Mendeleev highly regarded Shkatelov's research, utilizing its findings to support a proposal to increase tariffs on foreign turpentine and resin

Shkatelov's research demonstrated the economic feasibility of tapping resin in Russia. In Belarus, he investigated the composition and properties of resin acids from Belarusian pine, showing them to be analogous to those of American and French pine. In 1926, he conducted studies on turpentine and rosin production from Crimean pine. His extensive research on pine tapping techniques and resin collection technologies enabled the establishment of the Bobruisk and Borisov rosin-turpentine factories, as well as the Novobelitsa rosin-soap plant, during 1929–1930.

Shkatelov is considered the founder of the Belarusian scientific school in forest chemistry, having trained a large cohort of forest chemists and advancing the field significantly

== Honors and awards ==
In 1919, Vladimir Viktorovich Shkatelov was awarded the title of Honored Professor by the decision of the Council of the Kharkiv Agricultural Institute.

In 1929, he was elected an Academician of the NAS BSSR.

In 1938, Shkatelov received the title of Honored Scientist of the BSSR.

== Legacy ==
A laboratory of Chemistry of Natural High-Molecular Compounds at the Institute of Physical-Organic Chemistry of the Belarusian Academy of Sciences was named in honor of Vladimir Viktorovich Shkatelov. He was buried at the Military Cemetery in Minsk

== Interesting Facts ==
Prediction of Gas Burners: Vladimir Viktorovich Shkatelov predicted the development of Auer gas burners, which utilize wood gas.

Fluency in French: Shkatelov was fluent in French, and several of his works were published in Paris in the French language. He was a welcomed guest in France and even gifted a collection of resin acids to the French.

== Bibliography ==
- Shkatelov V.V. (1888). "On the Composition of Russian Resin from Pinus sylvestris". Russian Physical-Chemical Society Journal (journal).
- Shkatelov V.V. (1889). "On the Chemical Composition of Resins". Dissertation. Moscow.
- Shkatelov V.V. (1895). "On Oil-Gas Resin and Its Application for Producing Aromatic Hydrocarbons and Aniline Dyes". Technical Digest, Industrial Bulletin (journal).
- Shkatelov V.V. (1895). "On Tapping Russian Pine". Forest Journal (journal).
- Shkatelov V.V. (1897). "On the Identity of Abietic Acid with One of the Isomers of Salvianic Acid". Russian Physical-Chemical Society Journal (journal).
- Shkatelov V.V. (1897). "On the Resin of Various Conifers, Its Composition, Properties, and a New Method of Producing Turpentine and Rosin". Novoaleksandriya Institute (proceedings).

== Literature ==
- "Шкателов, Владимир Викторович". Brockhaus and Efron Encyclopedic Dictionary: In 86 Volumes (82 Volumes and 4 Additional Volumes) (in Russian). Vol. доп. IIa. St. Petersburg: F. A. Brockhaus. 1890–1907. p. 886.
- Rozkin, V., & Gekhtman, E. (1939). "A Remarkable Scientist: (Academician V. V. Shkatelov)". Soviet Belarus.
- Skrigan, A. I. (1940). "In Memory of Academician Vladimir Vladimirovich Shkatelov (1861–1940)". Academy of Sciences of the BSSR, Department of Technical Sciences (2): 3–20.
- Belarusian SSR: A Brief Encyclopedia (5 ed.). p. 696.
- Volkov, V. A., Vonsky, E. V., & Kuznetsova, G. I. (1991). "Shkatelov Vladimir Viktorovich". In Outstanding Chemists of the World (A Biographical Dictionary). М.: 506–507.
- Kostyaev, A. (1927). "Professor V. V. Shkatelov: (On the 40th Anniversary of His Scientific Activity)". Forestry, Wood Industry, and Fuel (2–3): 72.
