= Ivan Belyayev (footballer) =

Russian footballer

Personal information
- Full name: Ivan Vyacheslavovich Belyayev
- Date of birth: 26 May 1986 (age 40)
- Height: 1.89 m (6 ft 2 in)
- Position: Goalkeeper

Senior career*
Years	Team	Apps	(Gls)
2004–2005	FC Zenit Chelyabinsk	2	(0)
2006–2010	Holstein Kiel II	15	(0)
2007–2010	Holstein Kiel	1	(0)
- * Club domestic league appearances and goals

Ivan Vyacheslavovich Belyayev (Russian: Иван Вячеславович Беляев; born 26 May 1986) is a former Russian professional football player.

== Club career ==
He played made one appearance in the German 3. Liga for Holstein Kiel on 12 September 2009 in a 0–3 loss to Dynamo Dresden.
