= Vladimir Belyayev =

Vladimir Belyayev may refer to:

- Vladimir Belyayev (footballer) (1933–2001), Soviet football player
- Volodymyr Byelyayev (born 1944), Soviet Olympic gold medalist in volleyball in 1968
- Vladimir Belyaev (weightlifter) (1940–2020), Soviet Olympic silver medalist in weightlifting in 1968
- Vladimir Pavlovich Belyaev (1909–1990), Soviet Russian writer born in Ukraine
- Vladimir Mikhailovich Belyaev (born 1965), minister of information and telecommunications of Transnistria
- Vladimir Belyayev (ice hockey) (born 1958), Kazakhstani ice hockey coach
