= Kiknursky District =

Kiknursky District Кикнурский район (Russian)
- District
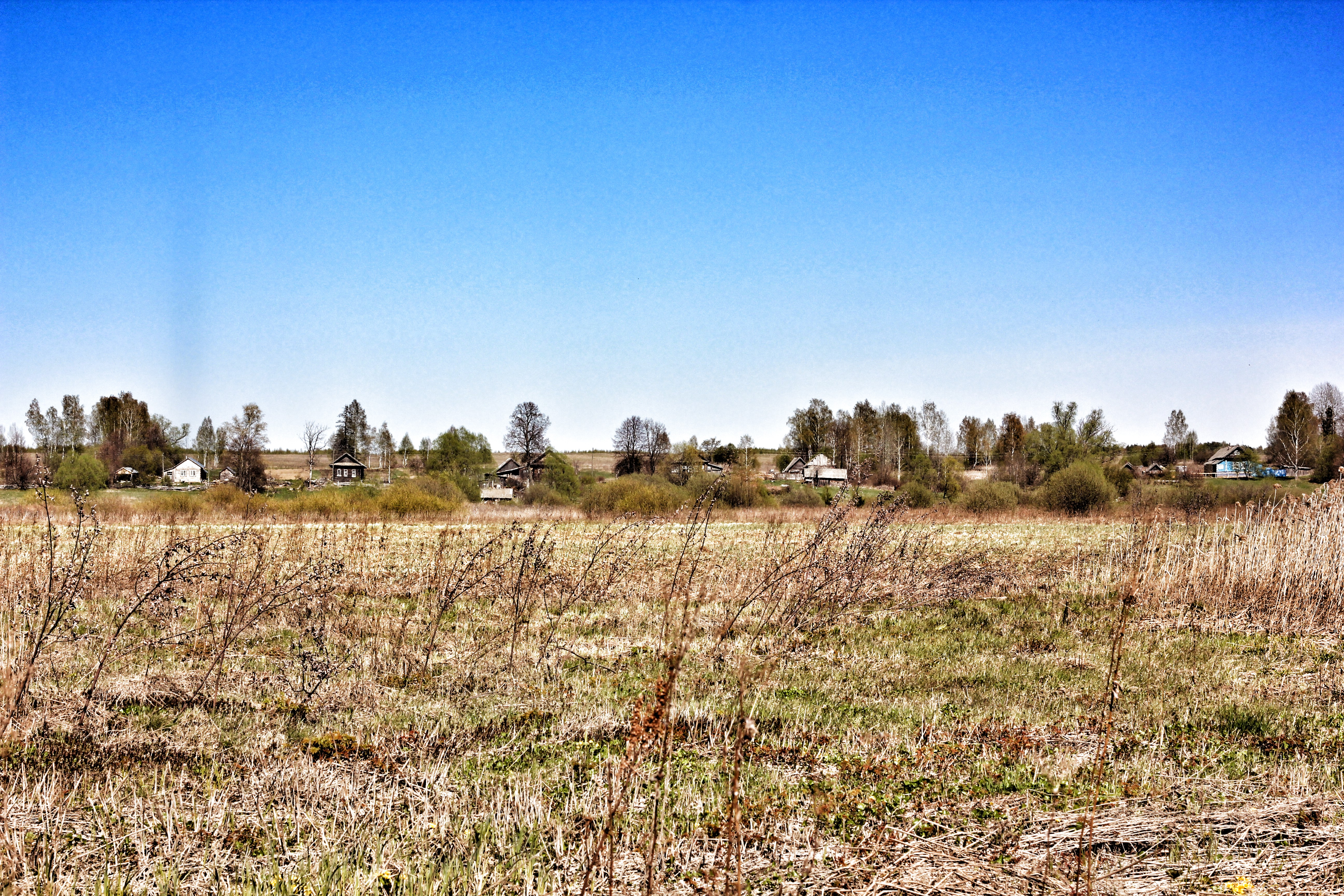
- Near Paybulatovskoye Lake, Kiknursky District

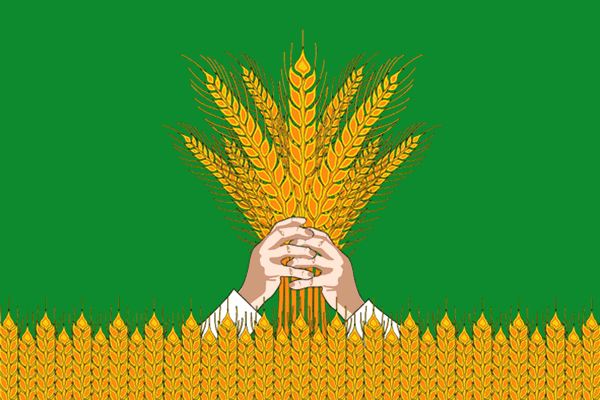
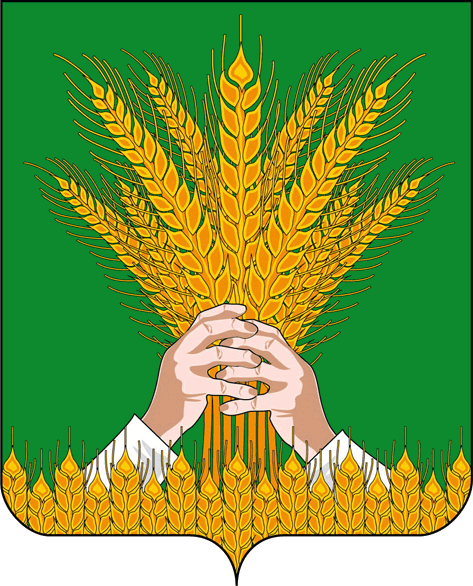
- Flag Coat of arms
- Location of Kiknursky District in Kirov Oblast
- Coordinates: 57°18′15″N 47°12′28″E
- Country: Russia
- Federal subject: Kirov Oblast
- Established: 14 July 1929
- Administrative center: Kiknur

Area
  - Total: 1,680 km^{2} (650 sq mi)

Population (2010 Census)
  - Total: 9,795
  - Density: 5.83/km^{2} (15.1/sq mi)
  - Urban: 50.7%
  - Rural: 49.3%

Administrative structure
  - Administrative divisions: 1 Urban-type settlements, 6 Rural okrugs
  - Inhabited localities: 1 urban-type settlements, 80 rural localities

Municipal structure
  - Municipally incorporated as: Kiknursky Municipal District
  - Municipal divisions: 1 urban settlements, 6 rural settlements
- Time zone: UTC+3 (MSK)
- OKTMO ID: 33616000
- Website: http://xn----8sbwafcbba3agltek4a.xn--p1ai/

Kiknursky District (Russian: Ки́кнурский райо́н) is an administrative and municipal district (raion), one of the thirty-nine in Kirov Oblast, Russia. It is located in the southwest of the oblast. The area of the district is 1,680 square kilometers (650 sq mi). Its administrative center is the urban locality (an urban-type settlement) of Kiknur. Population: 9,795 (2010 census); 13,228 (2002 Census); 16,347 (1989 Soviet census). The population of Kiknur accounts for 50.7% of the district's total population.
