= Harvest Time (Mowers) =

1887 painting by Grigoriy Myasoyedov

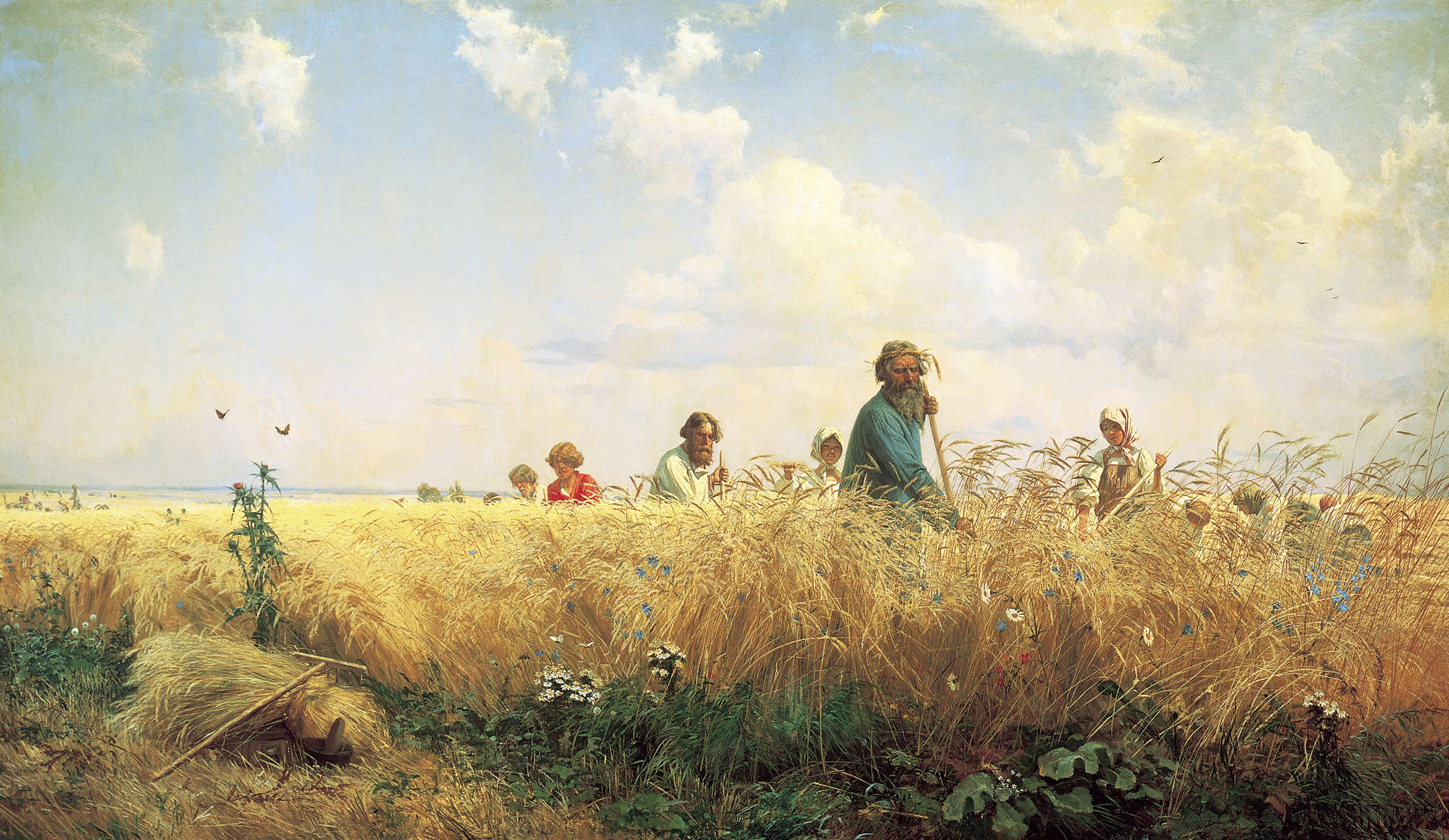
- Artist: Grigoriy Myasoyedov
- Year: 1887
- Medium: Oil on canvas
- Dimensions: 164 cm × 282 cm (65 in × 111 in)
- Location: Russian Museum, Saint Petersburg

Harvest Time (Mowers) (Russian: Страдная пора (Косцы)) is a painting by Russian artist Grigoriy Myasoedov (1834–1911), completed in 1887. It is kept in the State Russian Museum in St. Petersburg (Inventory Zh-6899). The size is 164 × 282 cm (according to other data, 179 × 275 cm). The work, combining elements of domestic genre and landscape, is devoted to the theme of peasant labor during the harvest. The painting was originally known under the title Harvest Time; later, the names Harvest and Croppers were also used. Modern literature usually uses the double title, Harvest Time (Mowers) or Harvest Time. Mowers.

The canvas was presented at the 15th exhibition of the Association of Travelling Art Exhibitions (Peredvizhniki), which opened in February 1887 in St. Petersburg. Right from the exposition, the painting was purchased by Tsar Alexander III. For a long time, Harvest Time was in the Gatchina Palace. In the summer of 1941, in the wake of the German invasion of the USSR, the collection of paintings from the Gatchina Palace was evacuated to Sarapul. After the war, the paintings were first in Pushkin, and then in Pavlovsk. In 1959, the canvas Harvest Time (Moers) was transferred to the State Russian Museum.

In a review article dedicated to the 15th Travelling Exhibition, art critic Vladimir Stasov called Harvest Time one of the most excellent paintings by Myasoedov and noted that it is full of "poetry, light feeling, something healthy and solemn". Art historian Dmitry Sarabianov wrote that in this work Myasoedov managed to achieve "monumental construction of the canvas", which corresponds to the general idea and shows "the beauty of the labor upsurge in the season of labor". According to art historian Irina Shuvalova, in this painting, for the first time in Russian painting, the "greatness and beauty of peasant labor and, most importantly, its powerful creative beginning" is so clearly shown.

== History ==
=== Previous events and work on the painting ===
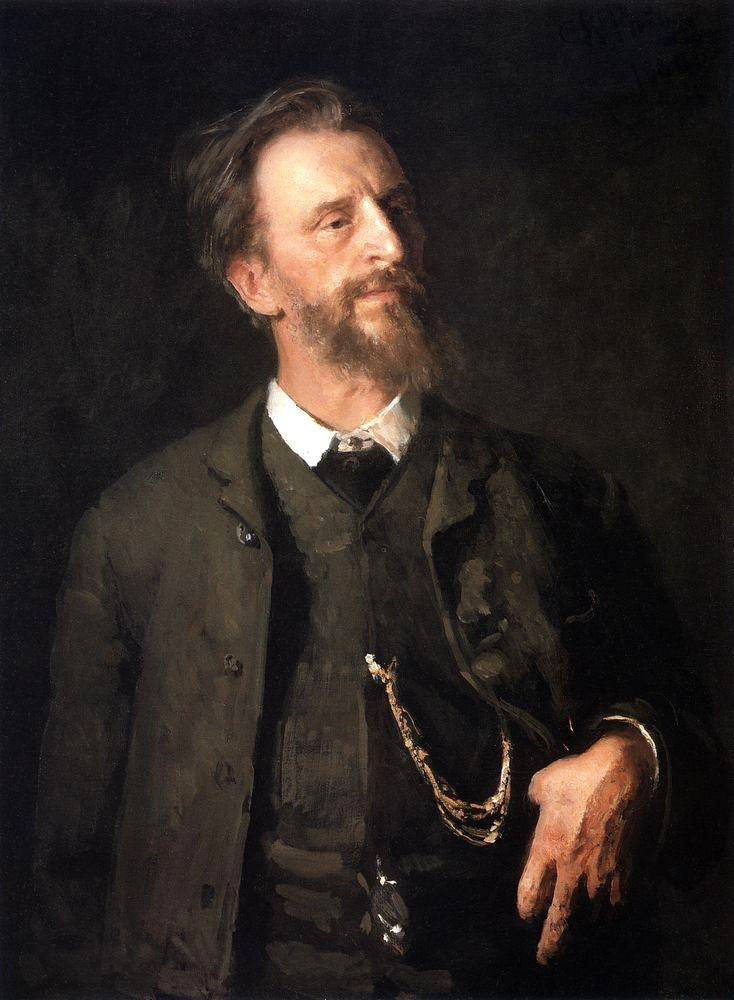
Ilya Repin, Grigory Myasoedov, c. 1884-1886, oil on canvas; Tretyakov Gallery, Moscow

In 1853-1862, Grigoriy Myasoedov studied at the Academy of Arts in the class of history painting. In 1862, for his painting The Escape of Grigoriy Otrepiev from the Tavern on the Lithuanian Border (now in the National Pushkin Museum), Myasoedov was awarded a large gold medal of the Academy of Arts. Along with this award, he received the title of class artist of the 1st category, as well as the right to a pensioner's trip abroad. In 1863-1866 and 1867-1869, the artist worked in Italy, France, and Spain, and also visited Germany, Belgium, and Switzerland. In March 1869, Myasoedov returned to Russia. In the following years, he lived and worked in Moscow, St. Petersburg, Tula, Kharkov, and Poltava provinces, as well as in the Crimea. In 1870, for the painting Spells, he received the title of academician of historical painting. Myasoedov was one of the founders of the Society of Travelling Art Exhibitions (Peredvizhniki), established in 1870, whose first exhibition opened in November 1871 in St. Petersburg. After that, all of Myasoedov's major works were exhibited at traveling exhibitions — Zemstvo Dines (1872), Reading the Regulations of February 19, 1861 (1873), Plowing (1876), Drought (1878), Self-Exhaustors (1882–1884), and others. In the first half of the 1880s, along with work on thematic paintings, Grigoriy Myasoedov turned to landscape motifs. In 1881, at the 9th traveling exhibition, he exhibited his canvas The Road in the Rye (canvas, oil, 65 × 145 cm, now in the State Tretyakov Gallery). Apparently, work on landscapes of this type led Myasoedov to the idea of creating a series of paintings "glorifying the power and poetry of peasant labor".

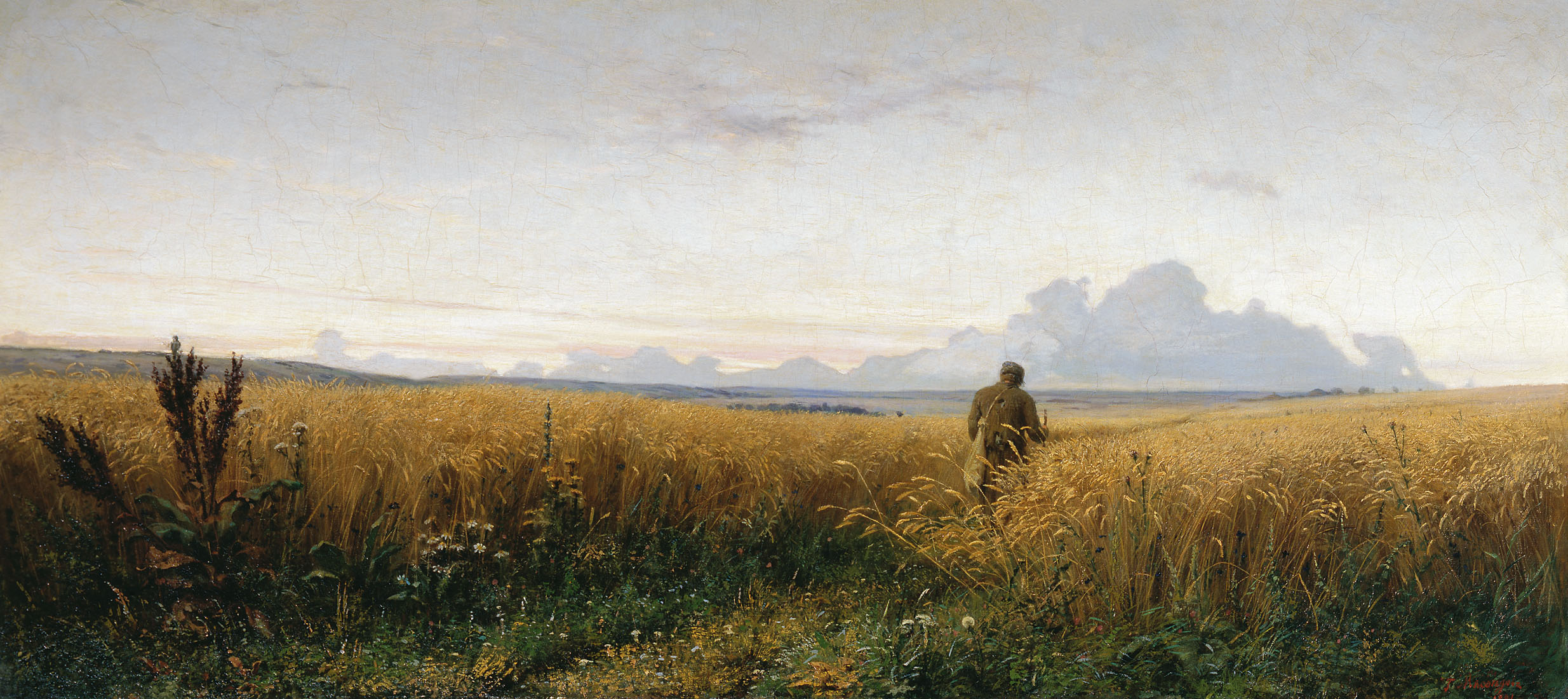
Myasoedov, The Road in the Rye, 1881, oil on canvas; Tretyakov Gallery

A few years after the creation of The Road in the Rye, the artist again returned to a similar motif. In a letter to landscape painter Alexander Kiselyov from January 25, 1886, (Note: The Julian calendar ("old style") is used to date events that took place in the Russian Empire.) Grigoriy Myasoedov reported that he had begun work on the landscape Rye Field at Sunset, which "comes out boring and does not give a proper representation". In the same letter, Myasoedov wrote: "For domestic paintings, I consider myself experienced enough in the landscape, and backgrounds can write without embarrassment, that's what I will move to". So the artist came to the idea of creating an epic canvas, not only including a landscape with a golden field of rye against the background of the summer sky but also praising the labor of peasants engaged in harvesting the bread crop. It took about a year to work on the painting Harvest Time.

=== The 15th Travelling Exhibition and other exhibitions of the late 19th century ===
Harvest Time was exhibited at the 15th Art Travelling Exhibitions, which opened in St. Petersburg on February 25, 1887, and moved to Moscow in April of the same year. The St. Petersburg part of the exhibition was held in Botkina's house (7 Sergievskaya Street), and the Moscow part in the premises of the Moscow School of Painting, Sculpture, and Architecture. Harvest Time was the only work by Myasoedov presented at the exhibition. Such future famous large-format canvases as Boyarynya Morozova by Vasily Surikov and Christ and the Sinner by Vasily Polenov were also exhibited there. The painting Harvest Time received good reviews. In particular, in a review published in the journal Russkaya Mysl, the writer Pavel Kovalevsky described his impressions: "Lovely picture of Mr. Myasoedov. You would not leave it and stand watching it for a long time, embraced by the Russian summer, Russian field...". The artist Vasily Polenov wrote to his sister Elena Polenova: "Myasoedov long ago such a good thing has not exhibited — a huge painting, men and women mowing rye. Surprisingly truthful and original...". The art critic Vladimir Stasov, who published a review article about the exhibition of the Peredvizhniki, also spoke well of the painting. Harvest Time was purchased directly from the exhibition by Emperor Alexander III.

In 1887-1888, the 15th Travelling exhibition continued its journey to other cities of the Russian Empire, visiting Kharkov (August - September), Elisavetgrad (September - October), Odessa (October - November), and Kiev (December - January). It is known that in 1889-1890, the canvas Harvest Time was exhibited at the 2nd parallel Travelling exhibition, which was based on works presented at the 15th and 16th exhibitions of the Peredvizhniki Society. This exhibition visited Kazan, Samara, Penza, Tambov, Kozlov, Voronezh, Novocherkassk, Rostov-on-Don, Taganrog, Ekaterinoslav, and Kursk. According to some sources, in 1892, Harvest Time was exhibited at the 3rd parallel traveling exhibition, held in the Picture Selivyorstov Gallery in Penza. This exhibition also traveled to Kazan and Samara. In 1893, the author's repetition of the canvas Harvest Time (under the English title Harvest Time) was exhibited in the Russian section of the World's Fair in Chicago, together with another painting by Myasoedov — The Escape of Grigoriy Otrepiev from a Tavern on the Lithuanian Border (1862, now in the National Pushkin Museum).

=== Next events ===
For a long time, the painting Harvest Time was kept in the Gatchina Palace. In a guide to the Gatchina Palace and Park, published in 1940, art historian and historian Andrei Pats-Pomarnatsky reported that at that time Myasoedov's painting Kostsy was in the 4th reception room of Alexander III, along with Vladimir Orlovsky's painting The Road near Kiev (1889), as well as a portrait of Alexander III in a jäger uniform by Alexei Korzukhin. According to Pats-Pomarnatsky, the painting Mowers is "beautiful in painting, but completely impersonal, not giving any idea of the true, miserable life of peasants and therefore quite acceptable for the rooms of the royal palace".

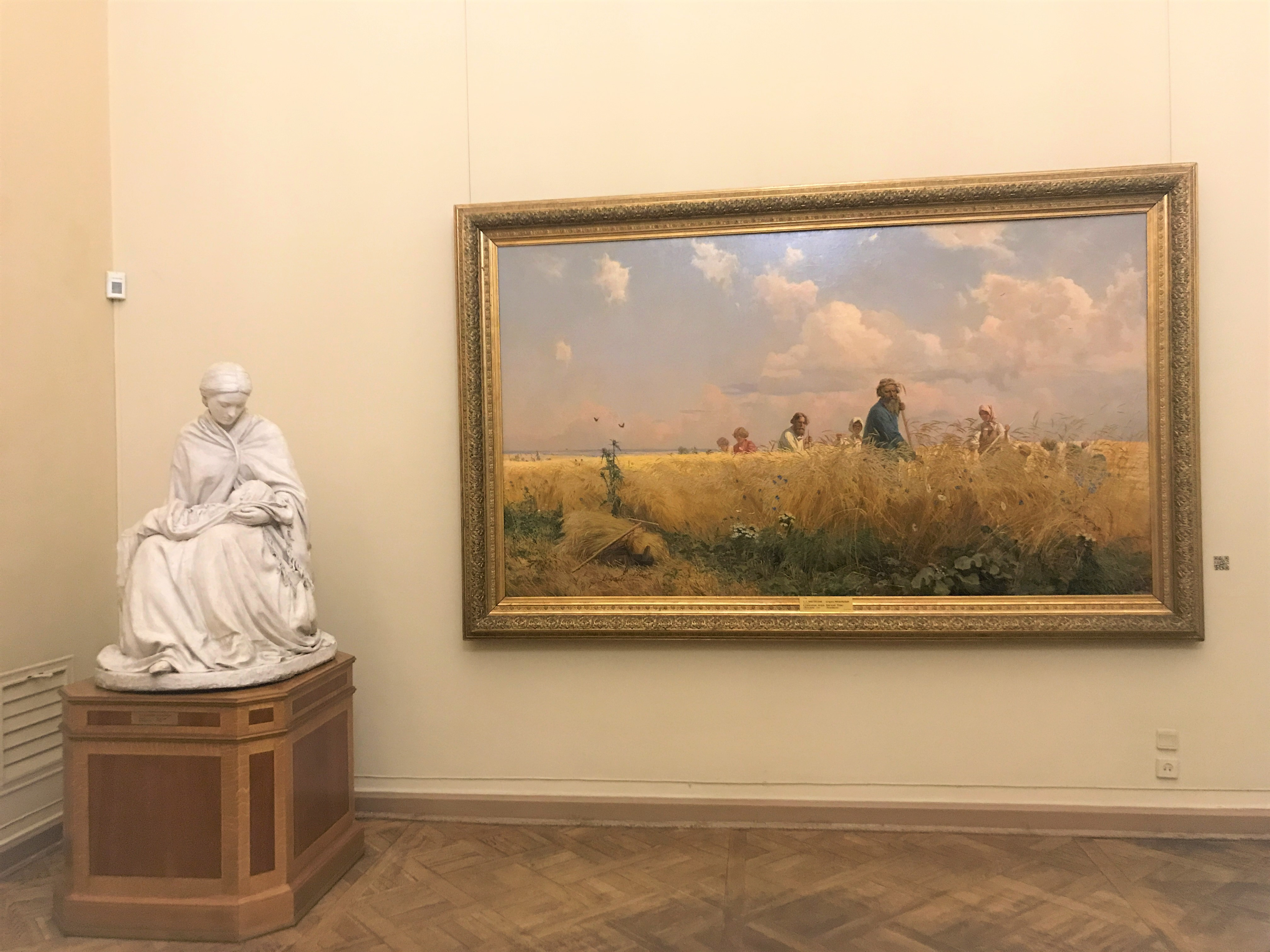
The painting Harvest Time. Mowers in the State Museum of Fine Arts

In the summer of 1941, after the outbreak of World War II, a significant part of the exhibits from the Gatchina Palace was evacuated by four railroad echelons to the city of Sarapul (Udmurt ASSR). Painting items were taken out by the second echelon, which was led by the artist P. P. Kirillov. In Sarapul, the exhibits from the Gatchina Palace were placed in the Republican Scientific Museum of the Kama Region (now the Museum of History and Culture of the Middle Kama Region), which at that time was also called the Museum-storage of the Leningrad Suburban Palaces. After the end of the war, in October 1945, the removal of valuables back to the Leningrad region began. At first, they were placed in the Alexander Palace of Pushkin, where the Central Repository of Museum Funds was established, and then this repository was transferred to Pavlovsk.

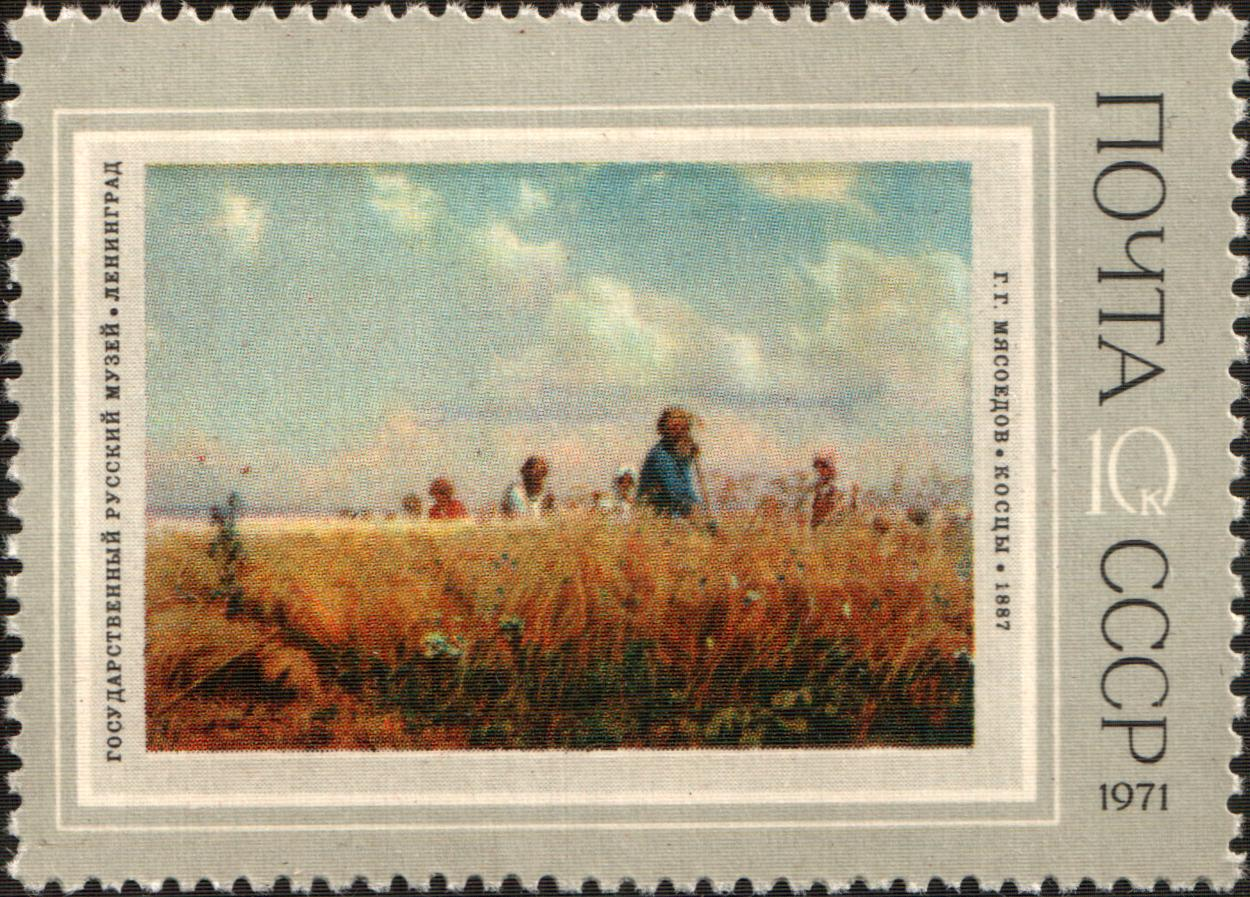
The painting Mowers on a 1971 USSR postage stamp.

In 1959, the painting Harvest Time. Mowers, at that time kept in the Pavlovsky Palace Museum, was transferred from the Central Repository of Museum Funds to the State Russian Museum. The painting is exhibited in Hall 31 of the Mikhailovsky Palace, where there are also paintings To War by Konstantin Savitsky, In a Warm Land by Nikolai Yaroshenko, Feast of the Cross by Illarion Pryanishnikov, and others.

The painting Harvest Time. Mowers was one of the exhibits of the exhibition The Peasant World in Russian Art, held from May to August 2005 at the State Historical Museum in Moscow, and then, from October 2005 to February 2006, at the Benois Building of the State Russian Museum in St. Petersburg. From January 2016 to January 2017, the painting Harvest Time. Mowers was exhibited at the exhibition Seasons of the Year, held at the branch of the State Russian Museum in Malaga (Spain).

== Plot, characters and composition ==
Under a blue sky with pinkish clouds, a golden field of ripe rye spreads out. In the part of the field on the right, the rye has already been mowed. Mowers are slowly moving towards the viewer, assisted by women and children. Peasants prepared for the harvest —an important event in their lives— in advance, worked as a whole family, and if necessary, called on the help of neighbors. In front, leading the others, is an elderly mower, apparently the head of the family. His sun burnt face looks serious and stern (as the critic emphasizes, not because of heavy thoughts, but because of absorption in work). He is dressed in a blue shirt, and his hair is tied up with a bundle of rye (according to popular custom, ears from the first sheaf were used for this purpose). In the expression of his face, his sturdy figure, his confident stride, and the vigorous movement of his hands, one can sense an inner collectedness. Behind him, in the same rhythm, moves the second mower, dressed in a white shirt. Although he is sweating and his hair is sticking to his forehead, he is trying to keep up with the first peasant. Next comes the third peasant in a red shirt. He is the youngest of the three; his face is animated with a smile, and his labor is a joy. Next to the mowers are peasant women who rake the ears and knit sheaves. The composition is based on the alternation of male and female figures, as well as dark and light spots of clothing.

Fragments of the painting Harvest time. Mowers

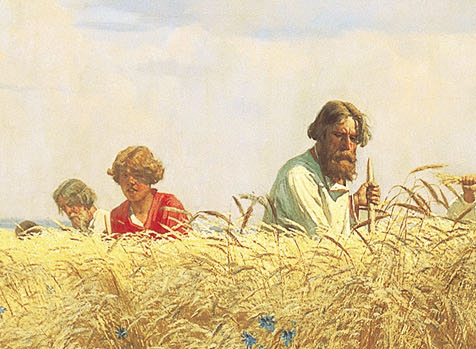
The second, third and other mowers

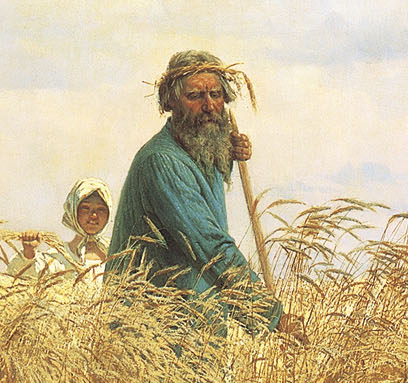
The first mower

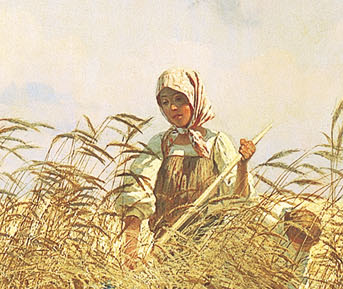
A peasant woman

A significant role in the work is played by the landscape, which includes a rippling sea of rye ears — boundless fields reaching to the horizon. According to art historian Irina Shuvalova, "nature shown in bloom, full of vitality, is perceived here as a synthetic image of the native land". The landscape depth is conveyed by means of color structure and rhythm of color spots. The choice of viewpoint —at an angle and somewhat from below— creates a sense of a larger unfolding of space and also achieves the "monumentalization of images" of peasants, whose figures seem to grow out of the ears and rise above the viewer. Without disturbing the wholeness of the image, the landscape is enlivened by various small details: butterflies flying over the field, burdock leaves, thistle stalks, as well as cornflowers peeping among the ears and daisies depicted in the foreground.

The painting is filled with optimism — in particular, its light and joyful coloring contributes to this. The blueness of the sky, shrouded in a delicate pinkish haze, and the green of the grass shade the golden-yellow color scheme of the rye field. For color and light gradations, the artist uses the principles of tonal painting. Contrasts introduced by the multicolored clothes of peasants add a "cheerful touch" to the painting.

== Studies, sketches and replications ==
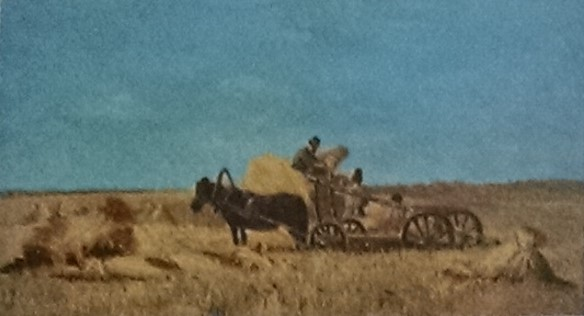
Sheaves harvesting (sketch, Russian State Museum)

In the process of working on the canvas Harvest Time. Mowers, Myasoedov created a number of studies and sketches. Among the sketches related to the subject of this painting, the most famous are Harvesting Sheaves (canvas, oil, 20.7 × 37.9 cm, GRM, inv. Zh-7623, acquired from Y. K. Linnik) and Rye Harvesting (paper, watercolor, 13.1 × 12.5 cm, GTG). The pictorial sketch Harvesting Sheaves, painted by Myasoedov in a light but slightly muted color scheme, is considered to be the "first element" on the way to the creation of the future canvas. At the same time, art historians have noted the lack of elaboration of the composition of this sketch, as well as the static nature of the scene depicted on it. In contrast, the watercolor sketch Rye Harvest shows a more complex development of the plot, as well as the artist's desire "for a wide coverage of space, and the unfolded show of peasant labor". Art historian Alexei Sidorov, noting that "Myasoedov was undoubtedly a strong and gifted watercolorist", attributed Rye Harvesting to his best watercolor works.

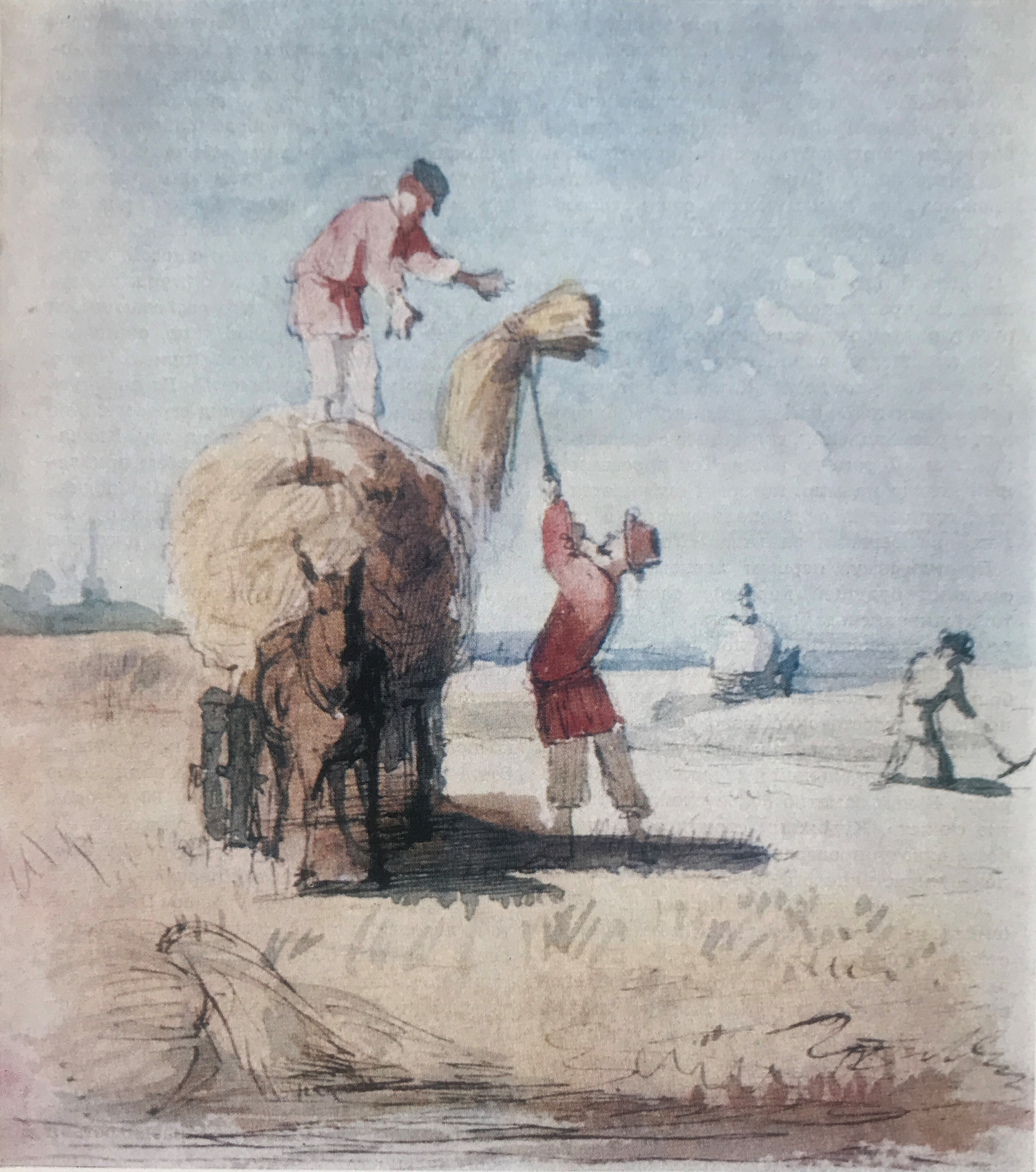
Rye Harvesting (watercolor sketch, State Tretyakov Gallery)

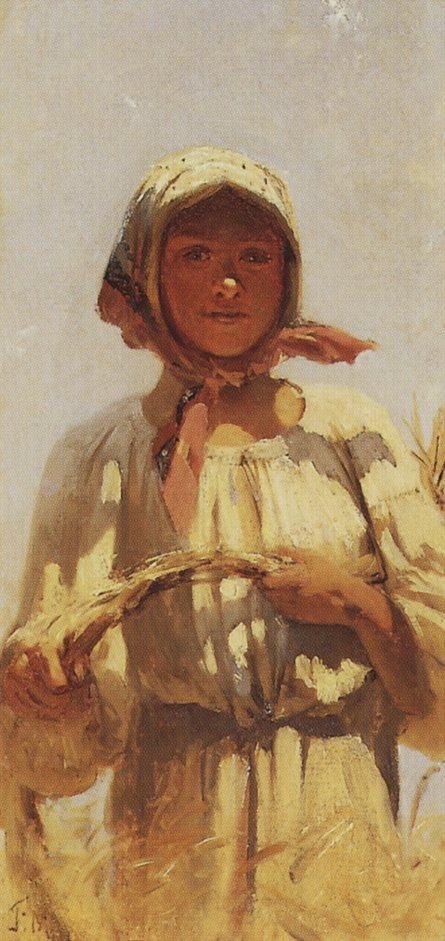
A Reaper

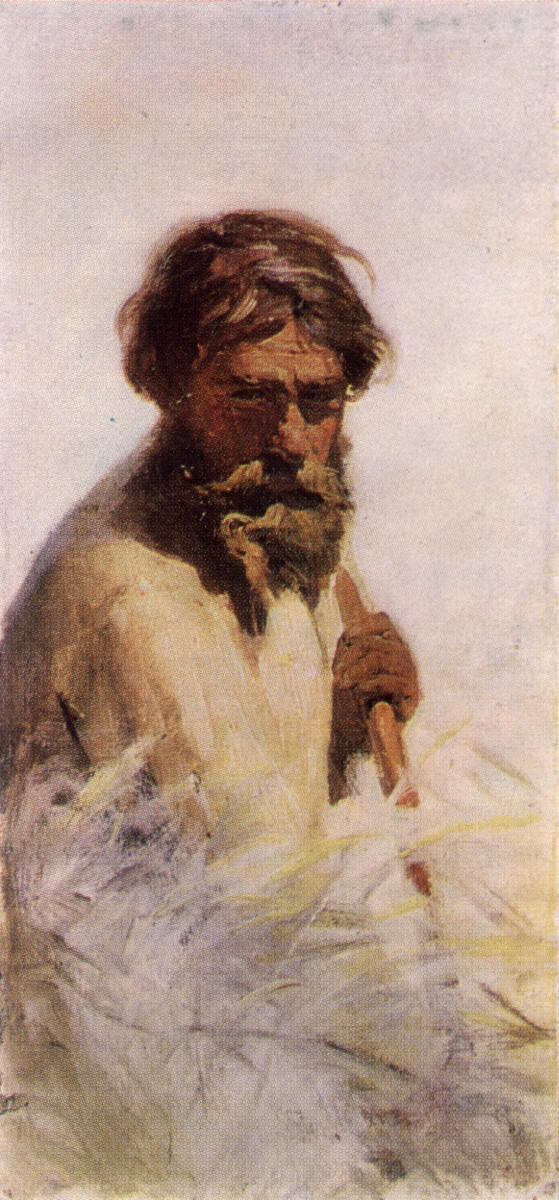
A peasant mower (sketch, State Tretyakov Gallery)

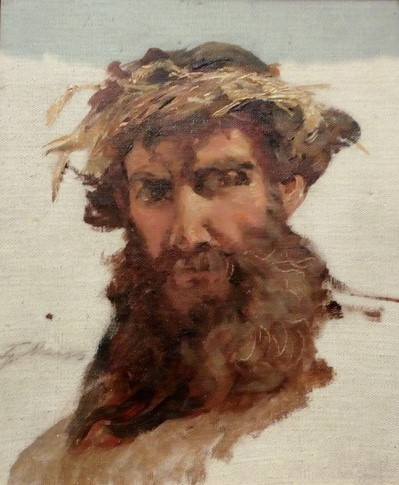
A man's head in a crown of ears (sketch, OMII)

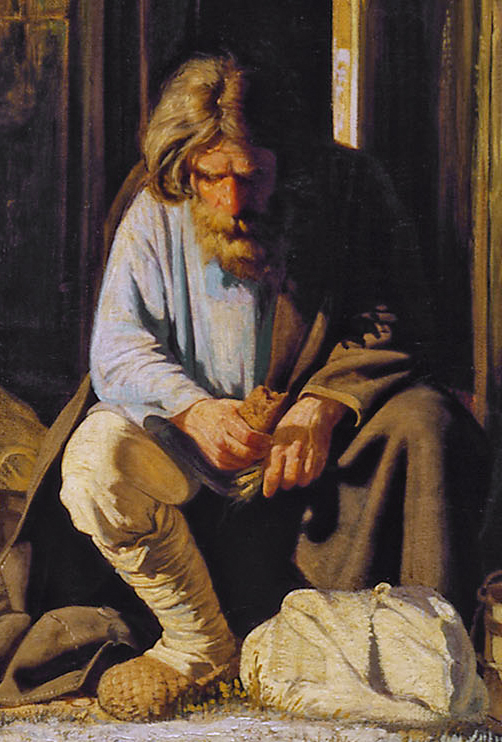
Sitting peasant in the right part of the painting The Zemstvo Dines (State Tretyakov Gallery)

Two sketches are kept in the State Tretyakov Gallery — Reaper (oil on canvas on cardboard, 35.5 × 16.7 cm, inv. Zh-257, acquired in 1962 from R. N. Nikolaeva) and Peasant Mower (oil on canvas on cardboard, 37 × 17 cm, inv. 21969, was in Matveev's collection, entered the museum in 1933). The painting Peasant Mower is considered one of the best sketches for the painting. It gives a "waisted image of a mower against the background of a clear blue sky and ripe ears of rye", and the artist focuses on the face of the peasant, as well as on the strong and dexterous movement of his hands. The appearance of the mower is similar to the seated peasant depicted in Myasoedov's earlier painting The Zemstvo Dines (1872). Although both figures are executed in a similar color scheme, they differ in that the seated peasant is deep in thought, while the mower depicted in the sketch is full of strength and energy. Art historians noted that the face of the mower in the sketch is portrayed much better than in the final version of the painting. This is explained by the fact that in a large canvas Myasoedov sought to show "the general labor impulse, work, as a matter of great vital importance," and this desire pushed aside the task of in-depth psychological characteristics of individual actors.

Another sketch, Head of a Man in a Crown of Ears (canvas, oil, 33 × 28 cm), dated to the mid-1880s, is in the collection of the Orel Museum of Fine Arts. It was acquired for the museum by the Ministry of Culture of the Russian Federation in 2009. According to some reports, this sketch is the artist's self-portrait.

In the A. Kasteyev State Museum of Arts is kept Myasoedov's painting Harvest Time (canvas, oil, 141 × 268 cm, 1887) —the author's variant-repetition of the canvas Harvest Time. Mowers. Another variant-repetition of the painting, larger in size (268 × 400 cm), was created by Myasoedov in 1892. The artist made this repetition, realizing that the original canvas, which was in the Gatchina Palace, was inaccessible to the general public. Myasoedov presented this author's repetition to the Moscow School of Painting, Sculpture and Architecture. As of 1964, the location of this repetition was unknown. In addition, in the early 1900s, Myasoedov painted A Peasant Mower (49.1 × 27.2 cm, private collection), which is a variant-repetition of a fragment of the painting Harvest Time of 1892.

== Reviews and critics ==
In the article Peredvizhniki Exhibition, published in the issue of Novosty y Birzhevaya Gazeta Newapaper on March 1, 1887, critic Vladimir Stasov wrote that Harvest Time by Grigoriy Myasoedov is one of the most successful paintings of the artist. According to Stasov, "the impression of a golden rye field, where, covered to the waist with ears, mowing rye men and women, light clouds in the sky, pink delicate reflections on the horizon — all this is full of poetry, light healthy and festive feeling".

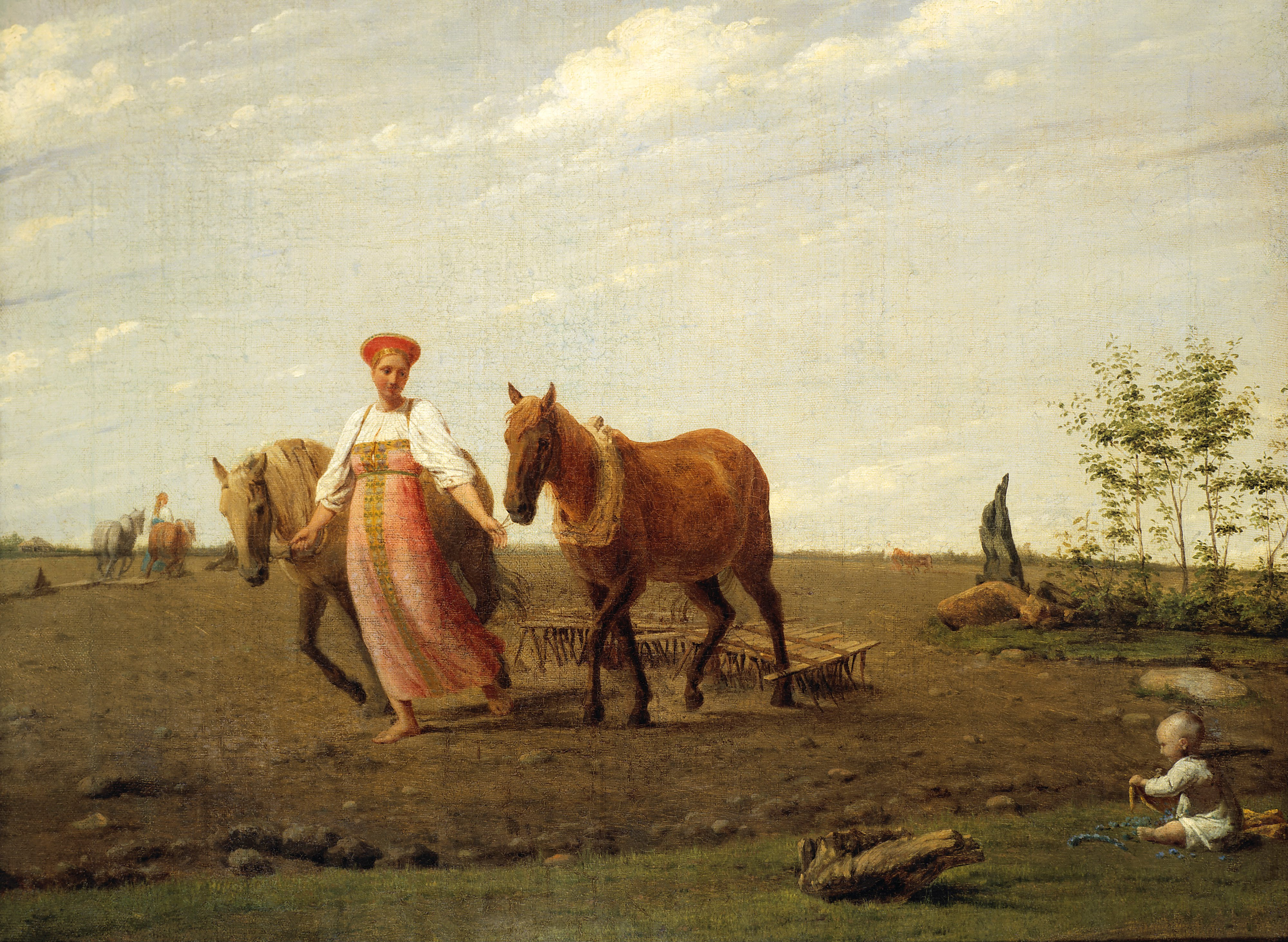
Alexey Venetsianov. In the Ploughed Field: Spring (first half of 1820s, Tretyakov Gallery)

In a review published in April 1887 in the journal Russian Mind, the writer Pavel Kovalevsky noted that the creation of Harvest Time testifies to the return of Myasoedov to his native doorstep, "to the purely Russian motif of fertile places, with muzhichki," to the theme that he began in the painting Reading the Regulations of February 19, 1861 (1873, now in the State Tretyakov Gallery). According to Kovalevsky, Harvest Time conceived and executed by the artist "happily and simply,¡", it really "burns and breathes countryside passion," and depicted on it "figures and landscape is equally good," so that the new work by Myasoedov with full right can be called "one of the decorations of the rich exhibition of the Society".

Art historian Dmitry Sarabianov wrote that Harvest Time belongs to a number of works by Myasoedov in which the theme of peasant labor is closely intertwined with the depiction of the rural landscape—all these paintings "testify to the artist's desire to convey the poetry of labor, the beauty of the land cultivated by man." At the same time, Sarabianov noted that in Harvest Time Myasoedov "failed with sufficient expressiveness to outline the faces of his characters, to show on them certain feelings," but at the same time the artist was able to create "a general impression of width, people's strength." According to Sarabianov, in this work Myasoedov managed to achieve a "monumental construction of the canvas," which corresponds to the general idea and shows "the beauty of the labor upsurge in the harvest season".

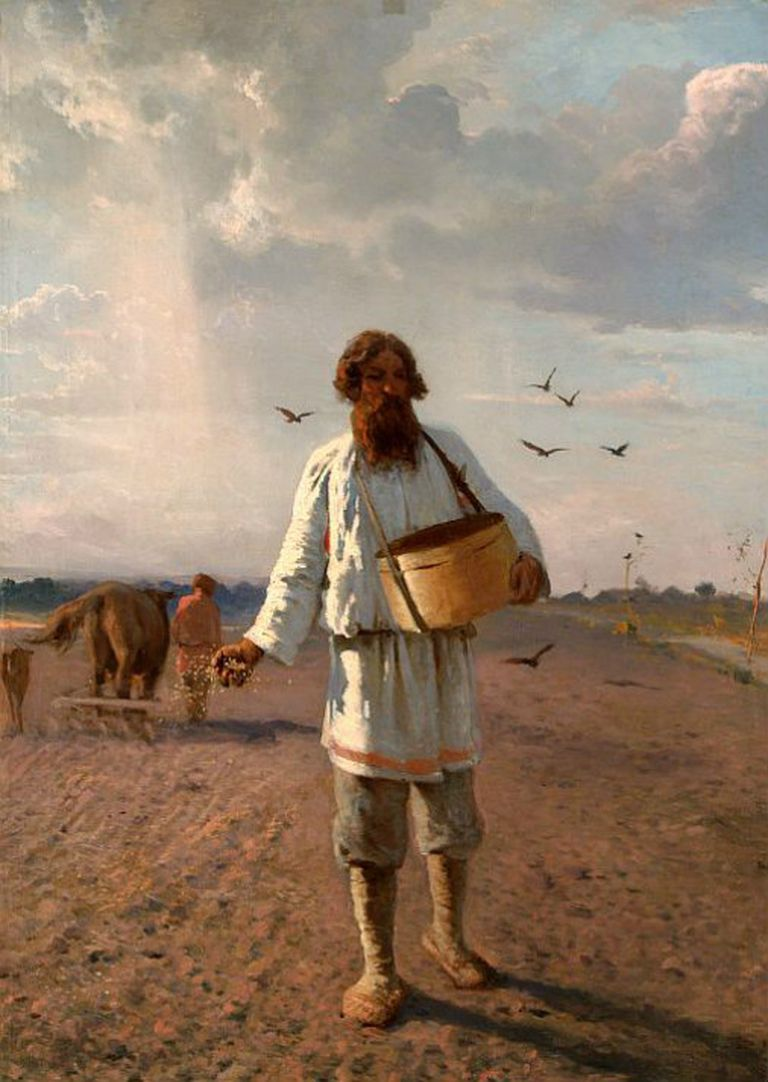
G. G. Myasoedov. Sower (1888, Latvian National Museum of Art)

The art historian Irina Shuvalova emphasized in a monograph on Myasoedov's work, published in 1971, that before the painting Mowers, there was no such "optimistic treatment of the theme of peasant labor" in the works of Russian artists of the second half of the 19th century. In this sense, Myasoedov's canvas can be compared only with Alexey Venetsianov's painting In the Ploughed Field. Spring, created in the 1820s. According to Shuvalova, in Mowers for the first time in Russian painting is so clearly shown "the greatness and beauty of peasant labor and, most importantly, its powerful creative beginning".

Art historian Frieda Roginskaya wrote that Harvest Time, which appeared in 1887, as well as the paintings that followed it, Sower (1888, LNKhM) and Rising Fields (1892, GRM), represented a series of works that began a new stage in Myasoedov's work. According to Roginskaya, Harvest Time is "a monumental work with a clearly expressed epic beginning", and the main idea of the work is "the idea of labor enthusiasm, akin to creative joy". Roginskaya noted that both the painting as a whole and the figures of individual mowers evoke associations with Alexey Koltsov's poem Mower (1836), as well as with the haymaking scene described by Leo Tolstoy in the novel Anna Karenina.

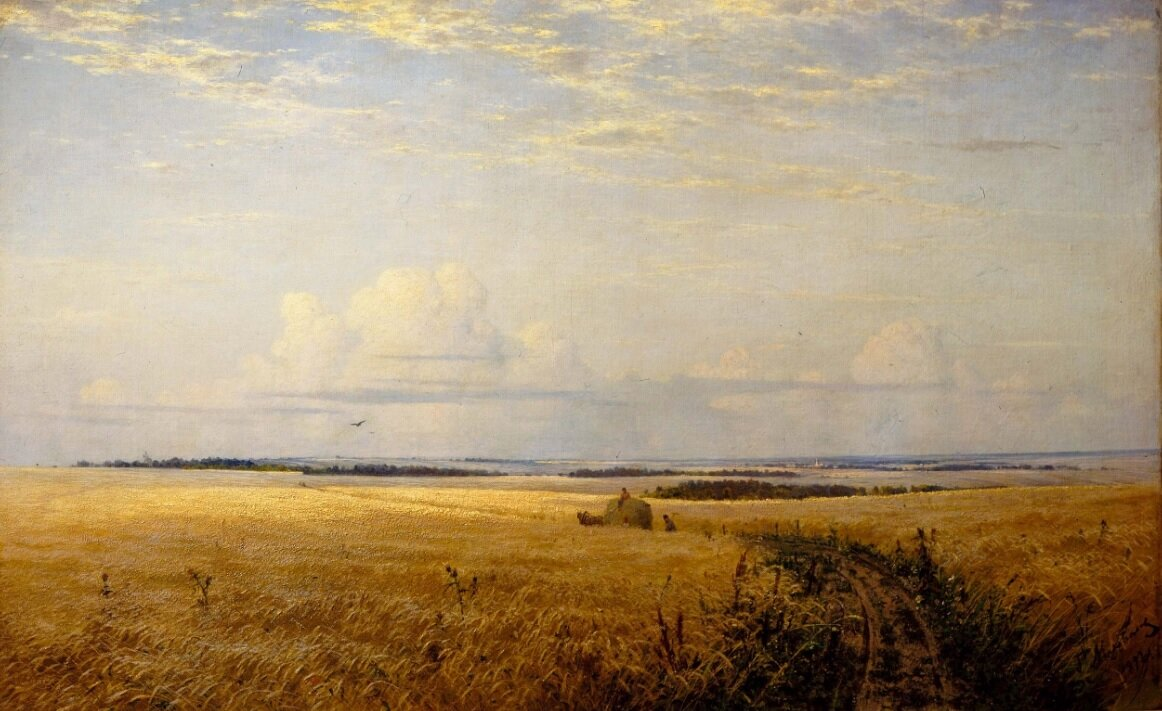
G. G. Myasoedov. Rising Fields (1892, Russian State Museum)

Art historian Nonna Yakovleva believed that the paintings Harvest Time. Mowers and Rising Fields may be considered a kind of trilogy by Myasoedov, "celebrating the peasants' labor". Yakovleva noted that the expressiveness of Harvest Time largely benefits from the use of open natural space, and the sense of grandeur of peasant labor is achieved by the scope of the spatial solution of the canvas with a high sky and a field of rye, on which mowers are moving towards the viewer. At the same time, according to Yakovleva, the artist "does not fully overcome the contradiction of painting the landscape and dark, painted in the studio, figures"; in addition, "the dryly painted foreground of the picture starkly pays the attention".

Art historian Vitaly Manin noted the cheerfulness of the painting Harvest Time. Mowers and wrote that in it Myasoedov showed his mastery of 'plein air painting and object sense of reality,' which led to 'an almost physical touch of the beauty of blossoming nature.' According to Manin, in this painting, peasant labor is poetized and "any hints of critical judgment of reality disappear". Manin wrote that Harvest Time confronts the genre and landscape painting, but neither of them wins — "ripe, full-flavored bread complements the joy of labor, as if bringing the two genres to harmony".

== Bibliography ==
- Гольдштейн, С. Н. (1965). Развитие бытового жанра в 1870—1880-е годы // История русского искусства / И. Э. Грабарь, В. С. Кеменов, В. Н. Лазарев (in Russian). Vol. V. 9, book 1. М.: Издательство Академии наук СССР. pp. 300–361.
- Горина Т. Н., Прытков В. А. (1964). Крестьянская тема в жанровой живописи передвижников — В. М. Максимова, И. М. Прянишникова, Г. Г. Мясоедова, К. А. Савицкого // Русская жанровая живопись XIX — начала XX века / Т. Н. Горина (in Russian). М.: Искусство. pp. 167–206.
- Ильина, Т. В. (2000). История искусств. Отечественное искусство (in Russian). М.: Высшая школа. p. 408. ISBN 5-06-003705-3
- Кирпичникова, М. В. (2021). Эвакуация и хранение коллекций Гатчинского дворца-музея в годы Великой Отечественной войны // Эвакуация и возврат коллекций ленинградских и пригородных музеев (in Russian). pp. 18–31.
- Ковалевский, П. М. (1887). Художественные выставки в Петербурге. XV передвижная и академическая // Русская мысль (in Russian). pp. 122–133.
- Корецкий, А. Б. (1976). Выставки передвижников в Самаре // Краеведческие записки (PDF) (in Russian). Куйбышев. pp. 74–80.
- Манин, В. С. (2005). Русская живопись XIX века (in Russian). М.: СоюзДизайн. p. 312. ISBN 5-900230-62-7
- Масалина, Н. В. (1964). Мясоедов (in Russian). М.: Искусство. p. 96.
- Петинова, Е. Ф. (2008). Мясоедов Григорий Григорьевич // Русские живописцы XVIII—XIX века. Биографический словарь / Е. Ф. Петинова (in Russian). СПб.: Азбука-Классика. pp. 436–440. ISBN 978-5-91181-923-1.
- Рогинская, Ф. С. (1962). Григорий Григорьевич Мясоедов // Русское искусство: очерки о жизни и творчестве художников. Вторая половина XIX века, часть I / А. И. Леонов (in Russian). М.: Искусство. pp. 337–356.
- Рогинская, Ф. С. (1989). Товарищество передвижных художественных выставок (in Russian). М.: Искусство. p. 430.
- Сарабьянов, Д. В. (1955). Народно-освободительные идеи русской живописи второй половины XIX века (in Russian). М.: Искусство. p. 300.
- Сидоров, А. А. (1960). Рисунок русских мастеров. Вторая половина XIX в. (in Russian) (М. ed.). Издательство Академии наук СССР. p. 556.
- Стасов, В. В. (1950). Избранное: живопись, скульптура, графика. Русское искусство (in Russian). Vol. 1. М.: Искусство.
- Хворостов, А. С. (2008). Г. Г. Мясоедов: известный и неизвестный. Библиотека серии историко-культурного наследия Орловского края (in Russian). Орёл. p. 249. ISBN 978-5-9708-0079-9.
- Хворостов, А. С. (2012). Григорий Мясоедов. Малая серия искусств (in Russian). М.: Арт-Родник. p. 96. ISBN 978-5-404-00241-6.
- Шувалова, И. Н. (1971). Мясоедов (in Russian). Л.: Искусство, Ленинградское отделение. p. 144.
- Шувалова, И. Н. (1994). Страдная пора // Художник (in Russian). p. 18.
- Яковлева, Н. А. (2021). Реализм в русской живописи. Опыт жанровой хронотипологии (in Russian). СПб.: Лань, Планета музыки. p. 784. ISBN 978-5-8114-5398-6.
- Государственная Третьяковская галерея — каталог собрания / Я. В. Брук, Л. И. Иовлева. М.: Красная площадь, 2001. V. 4: Живопись второй половины XIX века, книга 1, А—М. 528 p. ISBN 5-900743-56-X
- Государственный Русский музей — Живопись, XVIII — начало XX века (каталог). Л.: Аврора и Искусство, 1980. 448 p.
- Государственный Русский музей — каталог собрания / Г. Н. Голдовский, В. А. Леняшин. СПб.: Palace Editions, 2016. V. 6: Живопись второй половины XIX века (К—М). 176 p. ISBN 978-5-93332-565-9
- Мясоедов, Г. Г. (1972). Письма, документы, воспоминания / В. С. Оголевец (in Russian). М.: Искусство. p. 328.
- Поленов, В. Д. (1950). Письма, дневники, воспоминания / Е. В. Сахарова (in Russian). М.: Искусство. p. 520.
- Пензенская областная картинная галерея имени К. А. Савицкого / В. П. Сазонов, Н. Д. Валукина. М.: Изобразительное искусство, 1979. 84 p. (Художественные музеи СССР).
- Товарищество передвижных художественных выставок. Письма, документы. 1869—1899 / В. В. Андреева, М. В. Астафьева, С. Н. Гольдштейн, Н. Л. Приймак. М.: Искусство, 1987. 668 p.
- World's Columbian exposition 1893. Chicago. Catalogue of the Russian section. Saint Petersburg: Imperial Russian Commission, Ministry of Finances, 1893. 572 p.
