= The Zemstvo Dines =

Painting by Grigoriy Myasoyedov

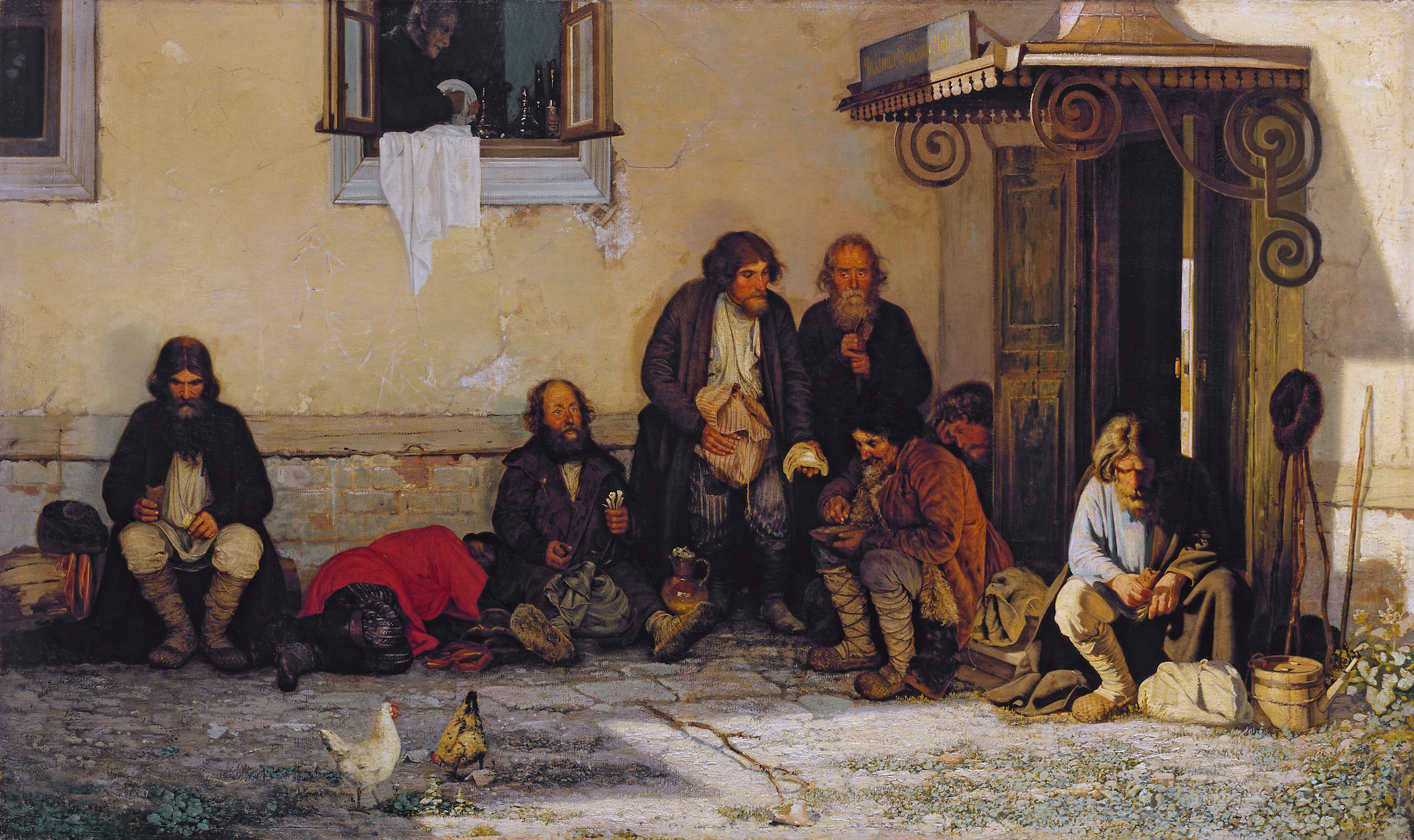
- Artist: Grigoriy Myasoyedov
- Year: 1872
- Medium: Oil on canvas
- Dimensions: 125 cm × 74 cm (49 in × 29 in)
- Location: State Tretyakov Gallery, Moscow

The Zemstvo Dines (Russian: Земство обедает) is a painting by the Russian artist Grigory Myasoyedov (1834–1911), completed in 1872. The canvas depicts peasants of the uyezd zemstvo assembly: their lunch is simple — bread with onions and salt, while the noble part of the zemstvo (not shown in the painting) dines indoors, as hinted by the footman in the window wiping dishes. Other titles were also used for this painting: the Uezd Zemstvo Assembly at Lunch Time and Zemstvo's Lunch.

It is housed in the State Tretyakov Gallery in Moscow (inventory 639). Its size is 74 × 125 cm (according to other sources 75 × 125.5 cm).

Myasoyedov worked on this painting in 1871–1872, and it was presented at the 2nd Exhibition of the Society for the Travelling Art Exhibitions, opened in St. Petersburg in December 1872. Myasoedov's work made a good impression: it was called "one of the best and most informative paintings on a modern subject". In 1873, the canvas was bought from the artist by Pavel Tretyakov, at whose request Myasoyedov finished the painting in 1876. In 1878 the canvas the Zemstvo Dines was included in the Russian exposition at the World Exhibition in Paris.

The art critic Vladimir Stasov called this painting as one of Myasoyedov's most significant works, as well as "a truly modern 'choral' painting", in which "there was also a note of indignation and satire". Art historian Irina Shuvalova wrote that the Zemstvo Dining was "the highest achievement of Myasoedov's entire creative life, the most capital, the most significant of his paintings", representing a major milestone in his work, which (along with such works of the 1870s as Barge Haulers on the Volga by Ilya Repin and Repair Work on the Railway by Konstantin Savitsky) defined "a new stage in the development of Russian realist genre painting".

== History ==
=== Previous events and work on the painting ===
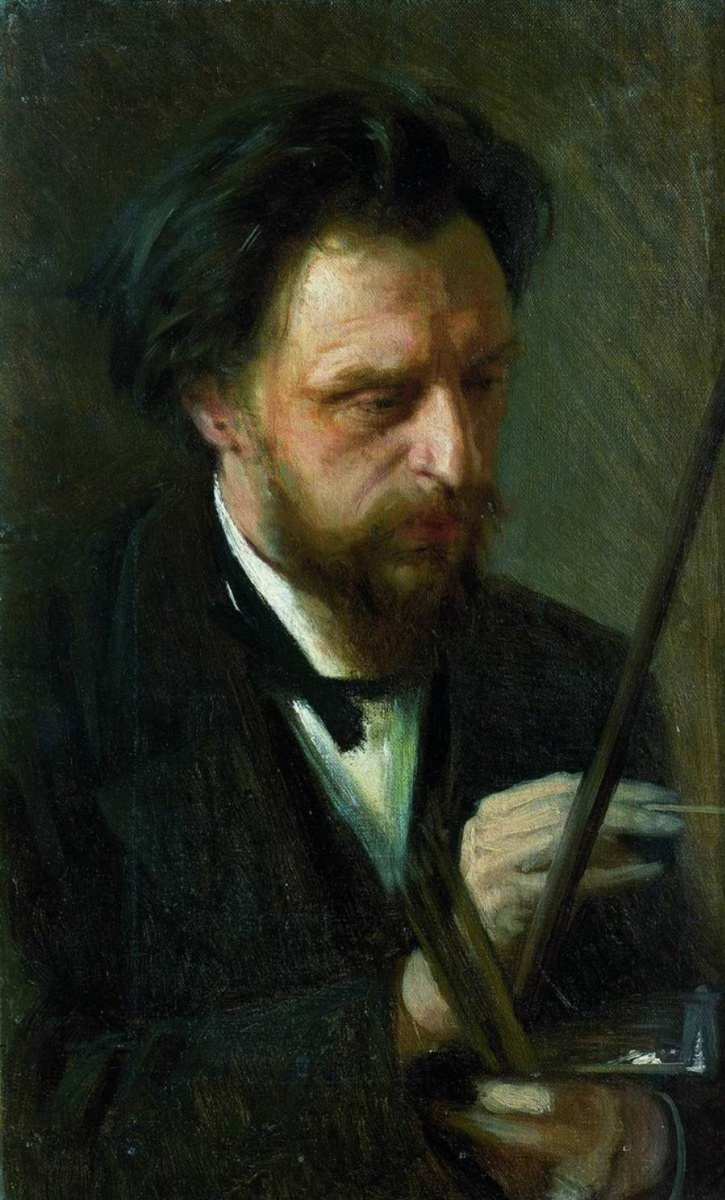
I. N. Kramskoy. Portrait of G. G. Myasoedov (1872, State Tretyakov Gallery)

In 1853–1862 Grigory Myasoedov studied at the Imperial Academy of Arts in the history painting class, where his mentors were Timoleon Neff and Alexey Markov. In 1862, Myasoedov was awarded a large gold medal of the Academy of Arts for his painting the Flight of Grigory Otrepiev from a Tavern on the Lithuanian Border (now in the National Pushkin Museum). Along with this award, he received the title of artist of the 1st class, as well as the right to a pensioner's trip abroad. In 1863–1866 the artist worked in Italy, France and Spain, also visited Germany, Belgium and Switzerland. In May 1866, he returned to Russia, and in the spring of 1867 he went abroad again, first to Paris and then to Florence. In March 1869, Myasoedov returned to Russia, and in the following years he lived and worked in Moscow, St. Petersburg, the provinces of Tula, Kharkov and Poltava, as well as in the Crimea; in 1870, he received the title of Academician of Historical Painting for his painting Spells. Myasoedov was one of the organizers of the Society of Travelling Art Exhibitions (Peredvizhniki"), founded in 1870, whose first exhibition opened in November 1871 in St. Petersburg (it exhibited two paintings by Myasoedov: Grandfather of the Russian Navy and For Berries).

Myasoedov worked on the painting The Zemstvo Dines between 1871 and 1872. In the artist's own words, he wanted "to get closer to the real and everyday in Zemstvo". For a long time, it was believed that there were no surviving testimonies and documents that would shed light on the history of the painting's creation. In particular, in a monograph on Myasoedov's work published in 1971, art historian Irina Shuvalova wrote: "Unfortunately, we do not know the history of the creation of this work. Not a single preparatory sketch has survived, there are no written testimonies from the artist or his friends about how and where work on the painting took place".

In the late 2000s and early 2010s publications, art historian Anatoly Khvorostov described how he managed to establish some details related to Myasoedov's work on the painting. The artist's father —Grigory Andreyevich Myasoedov— was a minor nobleman, and his estate was located in the village of Pankovo, Novosilsky uyezd, Tula province (now part of Novoderevenkovsky district, Oryol region). Assuming that the artist himself had to visit the district center (the town of Novosil) from time to time on business related to his father's estate, Khvorostov approached the Novosil Museum of Local History with a request for help in identifying the building depicted on the canvas The Zemstvo Dines. The director of the museum, Maria Andreyevna Kaznacheyeva, said that "the district zemstvo was completely destroyed during the war and after the restoration lost its former appearance" and that there were no photographs of the old building. Additional information was found in the written testimony of Anany Semyonovich Remnyov, a native of the village of Pankovo, who worked in the building of the former zemstvo in the first years after the revolution. Commenting on the painting The Zemstvo Dines, Remnyov wrote: "The porch and the facade of the building in general, the arrangement of the windows, remind me exactly of the building of the former Novosilsky Zemstvo. Apparently, Myasoedov saw it and put it on the canvas".

=== The 2nd Travelling exhibition and sale of the painting ===
The canvas was exhibited at the 2nd Peredvizhniki exhibition, which opened on December 26, 1872, in St. Petersburg. The painting was originally known as District Zemstvo Assembly at Lunchtime. Myasoedov's work was well-received by viewers who visited the traveling exhibition, it was called "one of the best and most informative paintings on a contemporary theme". The work was also called "one of the best and most informative paintings on a contemporary theme". The artist Ivan Kramskoy, in a letter to Vasily Perov, reported his impressions of the exhibition: "Landscape department and portrait department is brilliant. Genre paintings are average and even positively good. And Myasoedov's painting is beautiful". Nevertheless, there were also critical reviews. In particular, in a review published in the journal Otechestvennye Zapiski, the writer Pavel Kovalevsky, while praising Myasoedov's intention "to convey far from comic, and quite a different property, the situation of the members of the zemstvo," noted that the artist "was not fully prepared for his picture: idealist in vocation and manner, he did not align with the mundane resignation of a simple, non-protesting and non-casual drama in its real and coarse shell". Due to the fact that the paintings of the 2nd Travelling Exhibition were not shown in Moscow, some of them, including The Zemstvo Dines, were included in the Moscow part of the 3rd exhibition, which opened on April 2, 1874.

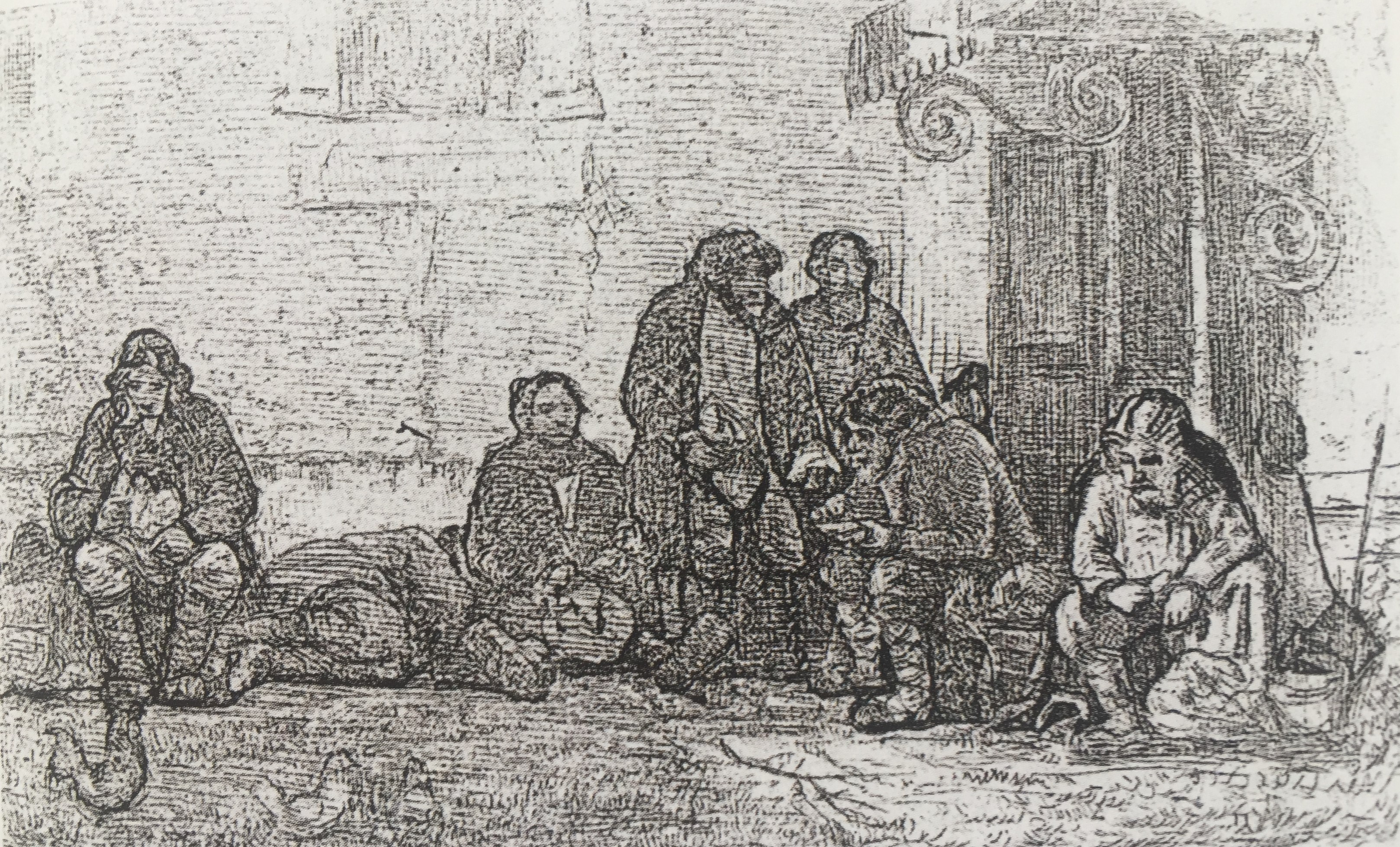
Engraving from the first version of the painting the Zemstvo Dines (1873)

After the opening of the 2nd Travelling Exhibition in St. Petersburg, Pavel Tretyakov expressed his interest in acquiring the painting The Zemstvo Dines. In a letter to Tretyakov, written in January 1873, Myasoedov wrote: "I am, of course, pleased with your desire to place my work in your gallery and, considering it an honor to get into your collection, I am ready to make every possible concession from the appointed price. The price I announced to the Academy for The Zemstvo Dines is 1,200. But since the Academy still does not say anything definite, and since I would much prefer my work to be with you rather than in the Academy <...>, I lower it to 1,000 rubles." In the same letter, Myasoedov asked Tretyakov: "Be kind, Pavel Mikhailovich, inform me of your final intentions so that I can freely decide on my actions and not be confused by a vain desire to enter your collection".

Pavel Tretyakov continued negotiations on the price and offered the artist 900 rubles for the painting. In response to this proposal, in a letter to Tretyakov on January 11, 1873, Myasoedov wrote: "Dear Pavel Mikhailovich, my sincere desire is to make every possible concession just to reach mutual satisfaction, although a hundred rubles are much more important to me than to you...". The artist agreed to sell the painting for 900 rubles, but "pure," without accounting for the 5% (45 rubles) that he had to pay to the Partnership—thus, he asked Tretyakov to increase the price to 945 rubles. In the same letter, Myasoedov wrote: "So, I think, Pavel Mikhailovich, that 45 rubles will not stop you, and I will have the pleasure of seeing myself in your gallery, as well as hanging a label stating 'sold,' and one care on the soul will be less". The negotiations concluded with Tretyakov agreeing to purchase the canvas The Zemstvo Dines for 945 rubles.

=== Final work on painting and subsequent events ===
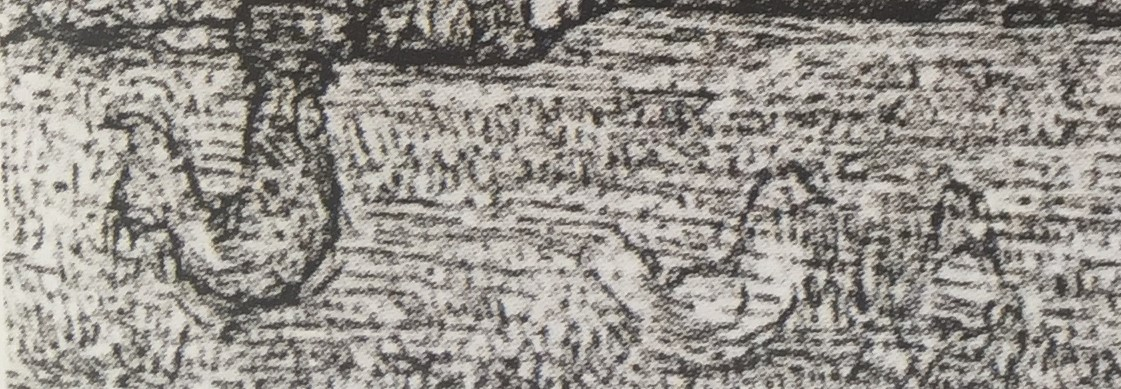
Rooster and chickens in the engraving from the first variant

Nevertheless, something about the picture did not satisfy Tretyakov, and in 1876 he expressed a desire to sell it, even for less than he had paid for it. Concerned about this development, Myasoedov, who was in Kharkiv at the time, wrote to Tretyakov in a letter dated December 9, 1876: "I assure you, Pavel Mikhailovich, that I am very pleased that you have my painting and not someone else. I regret that you were disappointed by Zemstvo..." From an earlier letter, dated September 1876, it is clear that Myasoedov offered Tretyakov to leave a deposit of 500 rubles (out of the two thousand he promised to pay for the painting Reading of the Regulations of February 19, 1861) to "cover the loss that may occur in the sale of my former painting".

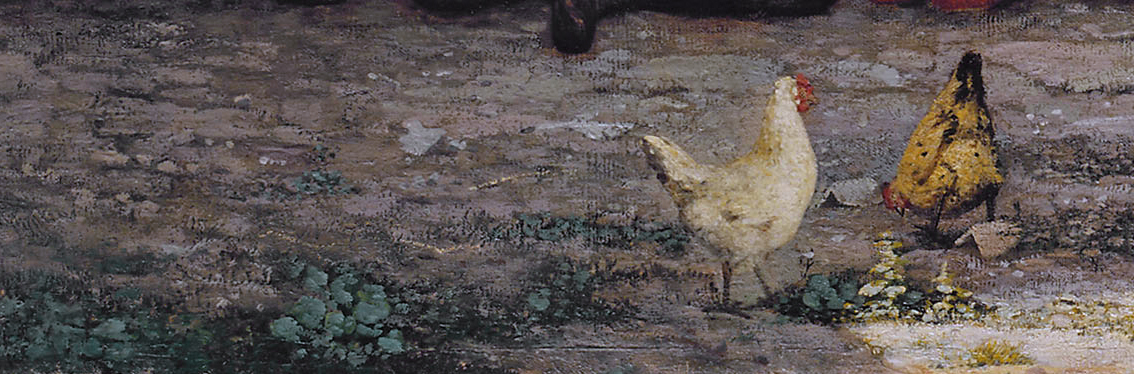
Hens without rooster in the final version

After all, Tretyakov decided not to part with the painting The Zemstvo Dines, but asked the artist to make some changes to the canvas. Myasoedov agreed, and in his letter, dated December 1876, he wrote to Tretyakov: "I would make any correction in The Zemstvo Dines, if you find an opportunity to send it..." and "I will do everything I can to eliminate the shortcomings that have been noticed." In the same letter, Myasoedov gave detailed instructions on how to send the canvas to Kharkiv, asking to "remove Zemstvo from the frame for safety and send it immediately by rail to the station, with the receipt delivered to the house of the Volga-Kama Commercial Bank on Rybnaya Street", where he lived. Some time later, the artist informed Tretyakov: "The painting you sent for correction, The Zemstvo Dines, I received in perfect order. After correcting everything that can be, I will immediately send it back to you".

One of the comments made by Tretyakov was that, in his opinion, the chickens depicted in the foreground did not seem quite appropriate in such a serious canvas. Replying to Tretyakov, Myasoedov wrote: "I think that it is not the chickens that are in the way, but some other small shortcomings, which you will probably not find superfluous either". According to the artist, the main problem was not the chickens but the rooster, which was present in the first version of the composition. According to Anatoly Khvorostov, "the hen's playful gait in the direction of the chickens left no doubt about his intentions", and this distracted viewers from focusing on the seriousness of the plot and composition. In addition to removing the rooster, Myasoedov also worked on the images of nearly all the peasants depicted in the painting and made some changes to the upper part of the porch. The differences between the 1872 and 1876 versions can be seen by comparing the present canvas with the print of the first version of the painting, published in the Illustrated Catalog of the Second Itinerant Art Exhibition, published in St. Petersburg in 1873. The revised version of the painting satisfied Pavel Tretyakov, and he kept it in his collection.

In 1878, two paintings by Grigory Myasoedov —The Zemstvo Dines and Reading of the Regulations of February 19, 1861— were exhibited in the Department of Russian Art at the Exposition Universelle in Paris. In the catalog of the Paris exhibition, the canvas appeared under the French title Intervalle d'une séance du Zemstvo (Assemblée provinciale) (G. G. Miassoïédoff).

According to some suggestions, the canvas Zemstvo Dining may have inspired the plot for Vsevolod Garshin's story The True History of the Ensky Zemstvo Assembly (1876), which is similar to Myasoedov's painting "in the force of denunciation" and "in the satirical sharpness of the content". It has also been noted that the topicality of the theme, the journalistic tone, and the "peculiar genre sketchness" of Myasoedov's work bring it closer to the works of Narodniks-writers such as Nikolai Zlatovratsky and Nikolai Karonin-Petropavlovsky.

== Plot and description ==
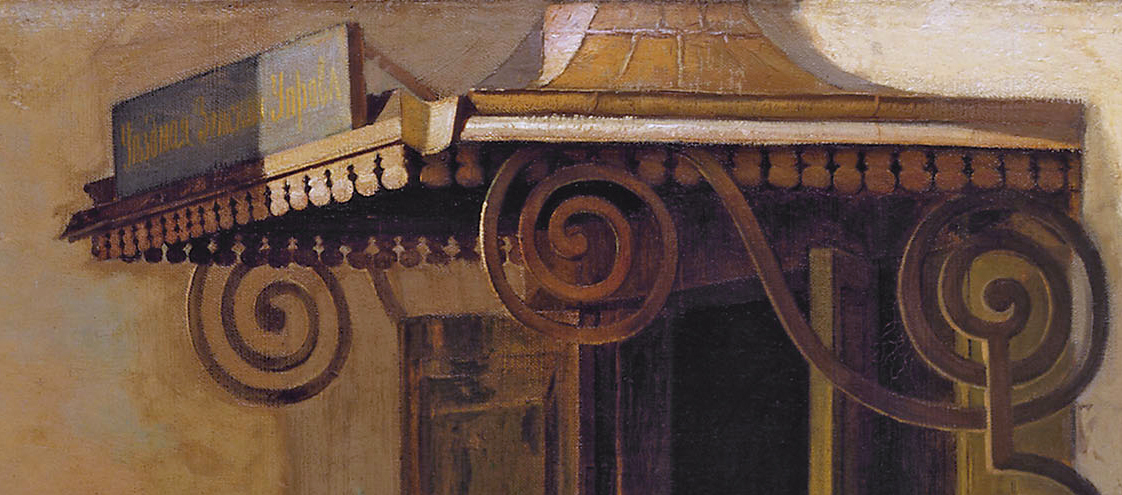
Upper part of the porch with the inscription "Uezd Zemstvo" (detail of the painting)

The action takes place against the background of a light-colored wall of a house, above the porch of which is the inscription Uezd Zemstvo. The wall is old, with cracks and in some places crumbling plaster; in one spot, someone has drawn a little man. The bright midday sun is shining. The resting and dining peasants are seated by the wall and porch. Their figures are arranged frontally, in a single row; there is no external action in the painting. Nevertheless, the impression that the canvas shows "an ordinary scene of quiet provincial life" is deceptive. Looking more closely, one can see that the sitting and standing peasants have "concentrated and pensive frowning faces".

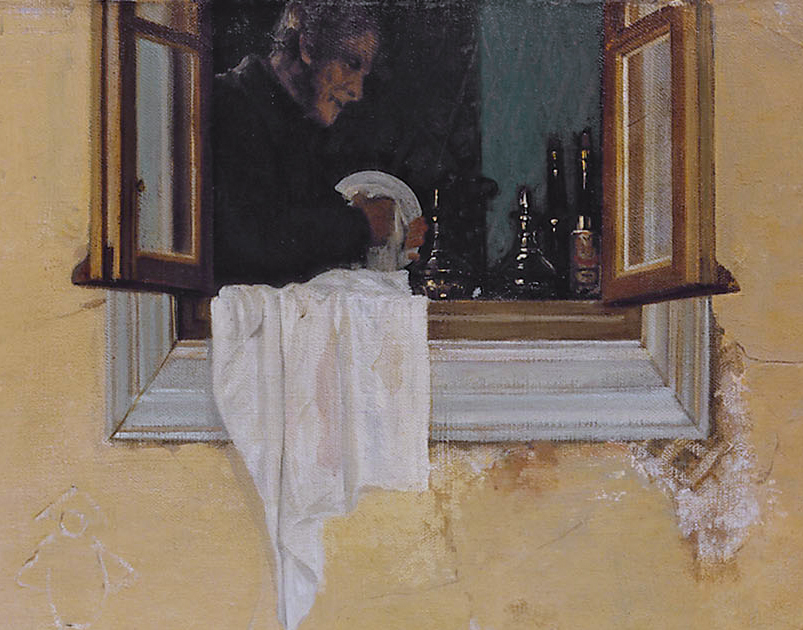
Footman at the window (detail of the painting)

At first glance, the peasants might seem to be waiting for the reception of petitioners, but this is not the case: in the picture, the artist depicted not petitioners but the peasant part of the zemstvo —arrived to participate in the yezd zemstvo meeting. Zemstvos began to appear in some provinces and districts of the Russian Empire after the Zemstvo reform of 1864. In particular, in Tula Governorate, uezd zemstvo administrations were established in December 1865. The zemstvos were given the right to make and execute decisions on certain economic and cultural-educational issues. Despite the fact that the peasants received the right to elect their representatives to participate in zemstvo meetings, the dominant role in them remained with the representatives of landowners. Representatives of this wealthier, "noble" part of the zemstvo are not shown in the painting. Apparently, their meal takes place in the zemstvo building, where through an open window can be seen a lackey wiping plates (floor); from the window hangs a wet towel, and on the windowsill is a battery of bottles of wine and liqueurs. Thus, by contrasting the peasants and landowners participating in the work of the zemstvo assembly, the artist illustrates the actual inequality of different estates. Nevertheless, he "avoids any declarativeness, intrusive moralizing" and invites viewers to draw their own conclusions based on the scene he depicts.

The most vivid of the zemstvo peasants is a peasant with blond hair sitting by the porch in the rightmost part of the painting. He is deep in thought, clutching a piece of bread in his right hand. His figure is slightly in the foreground and is illuminated by the sun. a part of the peasant's face is also illuminated, while the other part is in shadow; the resulting light contrast emphasizes the emotional expressiveness of his image. Perhaps Myasoedov used this technique to convey the doubts and thoughts in which the peasant is immersed. According to Anatoly Khvorostov, "the light here nevertheless defeats the shadow": "it seems that he is about to stand up, spread his shoulders, take a step towards the sun, towards the light and lead his fellow peasants". Irina Shuvalova notes that in the image of this peasant can be seen "both injured dignity and moral strength, and spiritual nobility". Subsequently, Myasoedov used a similar image in the sketch Peasant Mower (canvas on cardboard, oil, 37 × 17 cm, State Tretyakov Gallery, inv. 21969), painted during the period of work on the painting Harvest Time (Croppers) (1887, State Tretyakov Gallery). Although both figures are executed in a similar color scheme, they differ in that the seated peasant is immersed in deep thought, while the mower depicted in the sketch is full of strength and energy.

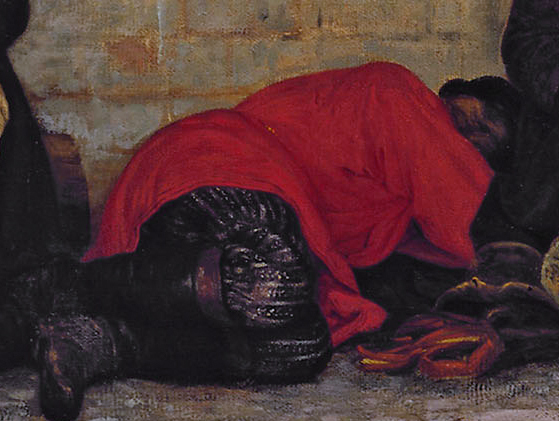
Sleeping peasant (detail of the painting)

Another man, also sitting on the porch, is sadly reflecting while sprinkling salt on his bread. He is offered salt by a peasant standing near him, whose friendly gesture and open expression show a sincere desire to help his comrade. The artist's attention to detail is evident, such as the calloused hands carefully sprinkling salt on the bread, as well as the two rags in which the salt itself is wrapped. Next to these two peasants is an old man leaning on a stick, whose gaze is full of bitterness. He is one of the most vivid images in the canvas: in his hunched figure from years of labor and wrinkled face "you can read the simple and bitter story of his life". In the center of the painting, under an open window, is a good-natured peasant "with a lively, sly look" who holds a bundle of young green onions in his hand. He is wary, listening to what is going on in the room above him, —perhaps to the clinking of chafing dishes. To his left lies a peasant in a brightly colored kumacha shirt. His clothes look newer than those of the other peasants—perhaps he is the youngest of them. He sleeps with his head resting on his bag, his face almost invisible. The image of the peasant sitting by the wall in the leftmost part of the painting, with his pose, gaze, and tilt of the head, as well as "some special self-deepening," is in harmony with the blond-haired peasant in a blue shirt sitting on the porch in the right part of the canvas. According to Irina Shuvalova, "their similar, symmetrically placed figures balance and close the central group, giving the composition stability and completeness". Art historian Mikhail Alpatov also noted that "the two on the edges are deliberately placed strictly frontally, symmetrically — this is an attempt to give the scene monumentality".

Fragments of the painting The Zemstvo Dines

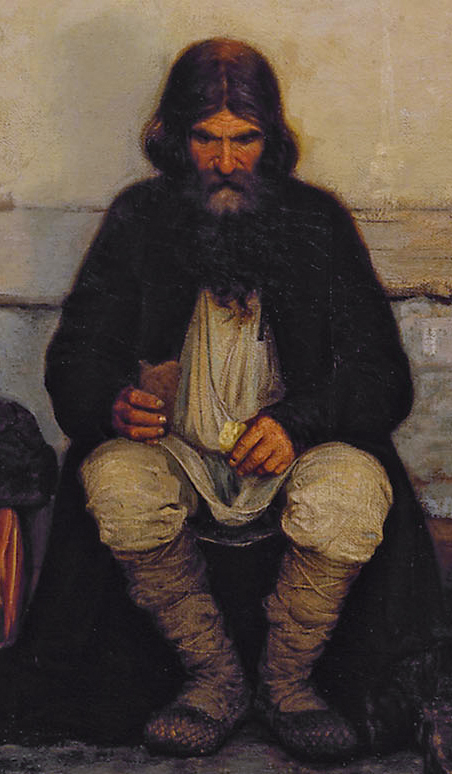
A seated peasant in the left part of the painting

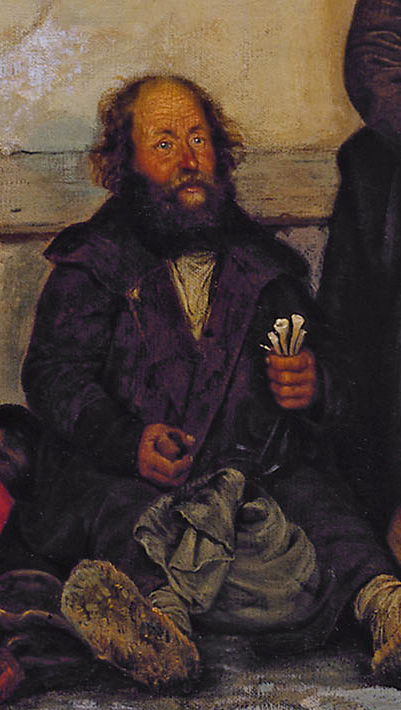
A seated peasant in the center of the painting

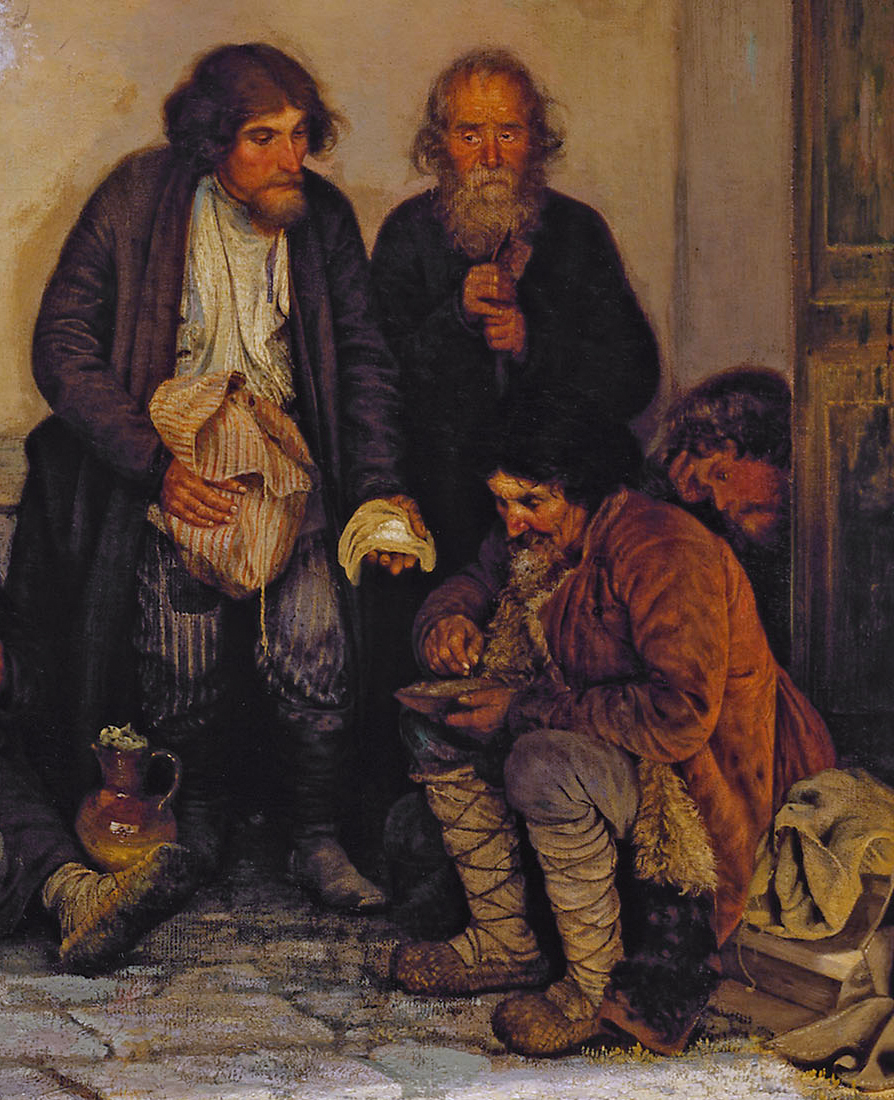
A group of seated and standing peasants at the porch

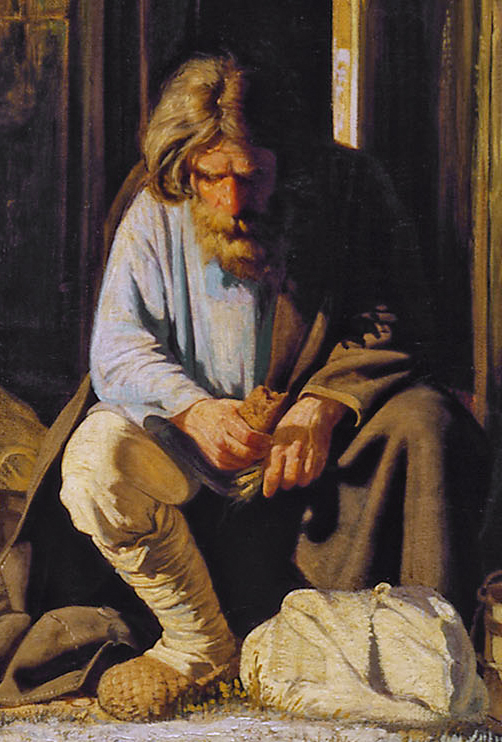
A seated peasant in the right part of the painting

The compositional solution of the canvas, Myasoedov abandoned the classical methods of stage construction of space and the arrangement of actors. According to art historian Natalia Masalina, he "took as if a part of life, limiting it to the frame". The space in the painting freely "spreads out" to the right, left, and upwards, and is bounded at the back by the peeling wall of the house. The figures of peasants, located against the background of this wall, acquire a special expressiveness and attract the attention of viewers. The shadow on the left of the building and a spot of sunlight in the right part create the effect of "pushing" the scene deep into the space of the canvas, giving it a natural and relaxed look. The action takes place outdoors and in strong light, which causes the brightness of the colors to lose its intensity. To convey this effect, the artist uses "whitewashing": according to Masalina, "the blinding sun as if helps him to extinguish the bright colors that would be incompatible with the character of the work". In general, the composition of the canvas is static, and the figures of peasants arranged in a row are psychologically connected with each other.

== Reviews and critics ==
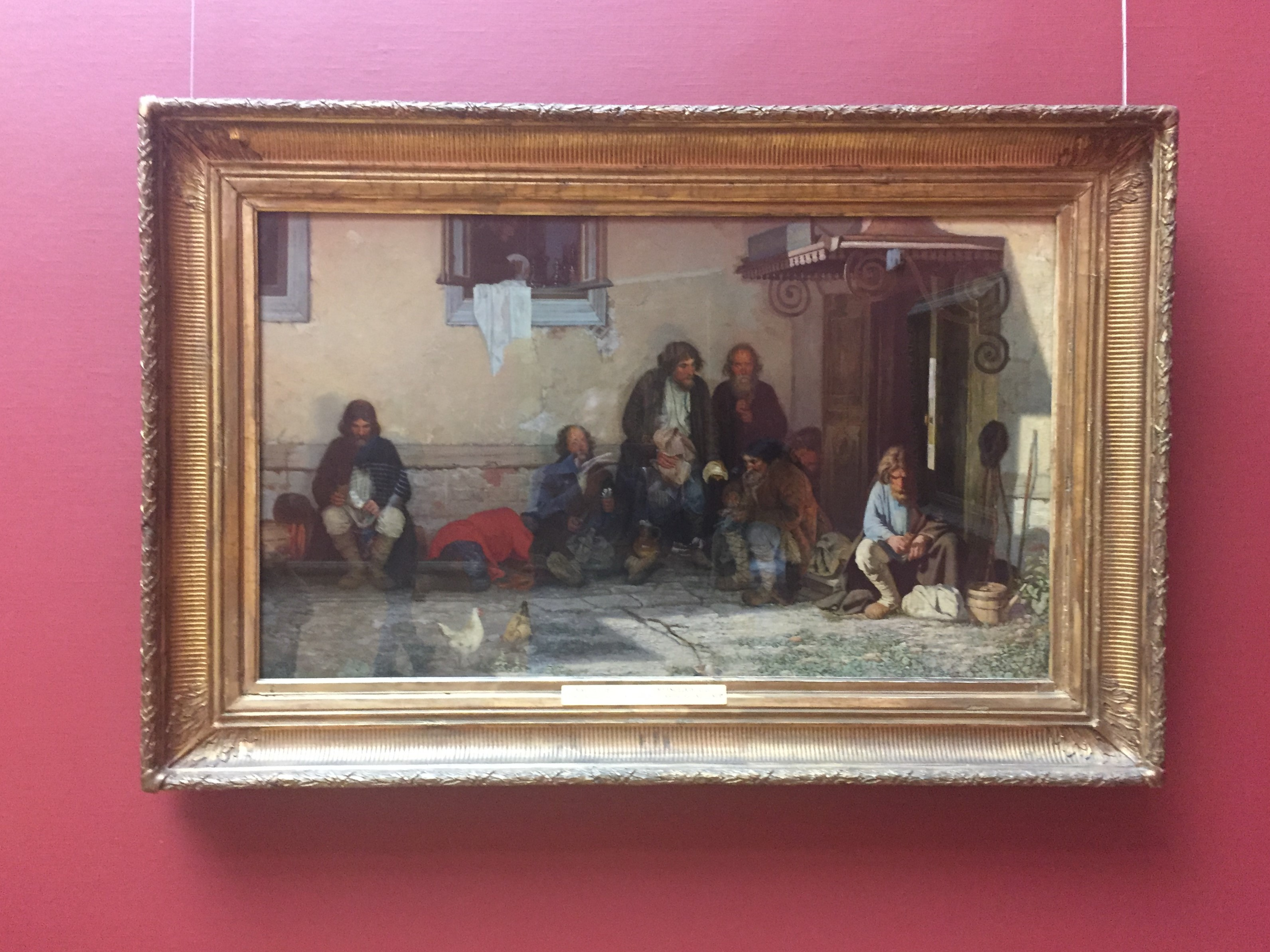
The Zemstvo Dines in the State Tretyakov Gallery

The art critic Vladimir Stasov, in his article Twenty-Five Years of Russian Art published in 1883, called the painting The Zemstvo Dines as one of Myasoedov's most significant works, as well as "a truly modern 'choral' painting." In Stasov's opinion, this painting "also carried a note of indignation and satire." Describing the plot of the painting, Stasov wrote that the peasants, dressed in traditional clothes, dine on bread and onions while waiting for their more affluent comrades "to finish their fried pheasants and champagne and then come to judge and argue with 'these' about all important matters".

The artist and critic Alexander Benois, in his book History of Russian Painting in the XIX Century, the first edition of which was published in 1902, recognized the prominent role of Myasoedov in the history of Russian fine art not only as "the main instigator and organizer of traveling exhibitions," but also as the author of "two of the most progressive works once in the Itinerant camp" —The Zemstvo Dines and Reading of the Regulations of February 19, 1861. Nevertheless, Benois criticized the first of these works: describing the plot of The Zemstvo Dines, which implies the inequality of rich and poor members of the assembly, he noted that it "can directly serve as a sample of false 'itinerant style'".

In a monograph on the artist's work published in 1971, art historian Irina Shuvalova wrote that The Zemstvo Dines was "the highest achievement of the entire creative life of Myasoedov, the most capital, the most significant of his paintings," representing a major milestone in his work. Considering The Zemstvo Dines alongside such paintings of the 1870s as Burlaki on the Volga by Ilya Repin and Repair Work on the Railroad by Konstantin Savitsky, Shuvalova wrote that these works defined "a new stage in the development of Russian realist genre painting". Shuvalova also noted that The Zemstvo Dines, which depicts an important page in the life of post-reform Russia, became "an integral part of the great and glorious artistic heritage of Peredvizhnostvo".

Comparing the work of Grigory Myasoedov and Vasily Perov, art historian Vitaly Manin noted that the painting The Zemstvo Dines opened "the next page of denunciatory art after Perov". According to Manin, "what Perov had a direct and unambiguous denunciation" (present in such works of the 1860s as Troika, The Drowned Woman, and Seeing the Dead Man Off), Myasoedov in Zemstvo Dining shows indirectly, emphasizing only one side of the relationship between the two estates, while implying the other through mental opposition. Noting the "humiliated state" of the peasants waiting for the end of the bar's dinner, as well as their apparent resignation and leisurely reasoning, Manin remarked that "this truly domestic plan is shown outside the action, it is deepened into a psychological state, and this outlines another approach to the resolution of the domestic genre".

== Bibliography ==
- Alpatov, М. V. (1967). Русская бытовая живопись второй половины XIX века // В книге «Этюды по истории русского искусства» [Russian domestic painting of the second half of the XIX century] (in Russian). Vol. 2. М.: Искусство. pp. 104–118.
- Benois, А. N. (1995). История русской живописи в XIX веке [History of Russian painting in the XIX century] (in Russian). М.: Республика. p. 448. ISBN 5-250-02524-2
- Goldstein, S. N. (1965). Развитие бытового жанра в 1870—1880–е годы // История русского искусства / И. Э. Грабарь, В. С. Кеменов, В. Н. Лазарев [Evolution of the domestic genre in the 1870s–1880s] (in Russian). Vol. 9, book 1. М.: Наука. pp. 300–361.
- Gombeg-Verzhbinskaya, E. P. (1970). Передвижники [Peredvizhniki] (in Russian). Л.: Искусство. p. 236.
- Gorina, Т. N.; Prytkov, V. А. (1964). Крестьянская тема в жанровой живописи передвижников — В. М. Максимова, И. М. Прянишникова, Г. Г. Мясоедова, К. А. Савицкого // Русская жанровая живопись XIX — начала XX века / Т. Н. Горина [Peasant motif in the genre painting of the Peredvizhniki – V. M. Maximov, I. M. Pryanishnikov, G. G. Myasoedov, K. A. Savitsky] (in Russian). М.: Искусство. pp. 167–206.
- Ilyina, Tatyana (2000). История искусств. Отечественное искусство [Art History. Patriotic art] (in Russian). М.: Высшая школа. p. 408. ISBN 5-06-003705-3
- Kovalensky, P. M. (1873). Вторая передвижная выставка картин русских художников [The Second Travelling Exhibition of paintings by Russian artists] (PDF) (in Russian). Отечественные записки. pp. 93–104.
- Kravchenko, I. А. (2011). Товарищество передвижных художественных выставок [The Society of Travelling Art Exhibitions]. Великие художники, том 96 (in Russian). М.: Директ-Медиа и Комсомольская правда. p. 48. ISBN 978-5-74750-131-7.
- Manin, V. C. (2005). Русская живопись XIX века [Russian painting of the XIX century] (in Russian). М.: СоюзДизайн. p. 312. ISBN 5-900230-62-7
- Masalina, N. V. (1950). «Земство обедает», картина Г. Г. Мясоедова [The Zemstvo Dines, G. G. Myasoyedov's painting] (in Russian). М.: Государственная Третьяковская галерея. p. 9.
- Masalina, N. V. (1964). Мясоедов [Myasoyedov] (in Russian) (М. ed.). Искусство. p. 96.
- Myasoyedov, G. G. (1972). Мясоедов. Письма, документы, воспоминания / В. С. Оголевец [Myasoyedov. Letters, documents, memoirs] (in Russian). М.: Искусство. p. 328.
- Nenarokomova, I. S. (1994). Павел Третьяков и его галерея [Pavel Tretyakov and his gallery] (in Russian). М.: Галарт. p. 286. ISBN 9785269003283.
- Petinova, Y. F. (2008). Мясоедов Григорий Григорьевич // Русские живописцы XVIII—XIX века. Биографический словарь / Е. Ф. Петинова [Myasoyedo Grigory Grigorievich] (in Russian). СПб.: Азбука-Классика. pp. 436–440. ISBN 978-5-91181-923-1.
- Roginskaya, F. S. (1962). Григорий Григорьевич Мясоедов // Русское искусство: очерки о жизни и творчестве художников. Вторая половина XIX века / А. И. Леонов [Myasoyedov Grigory Grigorievich] (in Russian). Vol. 1. М.: Искусство. pp. 337–356.
- Roginskaya, F. S. (1989). Товарищество передвижных художественных выставок [The Society of Travelling Art Exhibitions] (in Russian). М.: Искусство. p. 430.
- Sokolov, А. S. (2005). Санкт-Петербург на Всемирных выставках в Париже 1867—1900 гг. // Триумф музея? [St. Petersburg at the Universal Exhibitions in Paris 1867–1900] (PDF) (in Russian). СПб.: Государственный Эрмитаж. pp. 276–303.
- Stasov, V. V. (1950). Избранное: живопись, скульптура, графика [Selected works: painting, sculpture, graphics]. Русское искусство (in Russian). Vol. 1. М.: Искусство.
- Khvorostov, А. S. (2008). Г. Г. Мясоедов: известный и неизвестный [G. G. Myasoyedov: known and unknown]. Библиотека серии историко-культурного наследия Орловского края (in Russian). Орёл. p. 249. ISBN 978-5-9708-0079-9.
- Khvorostov, А. S. (2009). «Земство обедает» в Новосильском уезде. К 175-летию со дня рождения Г. Г. Мясоедова ["The Zemstvo Dines" in Novosilsky uyezd. To the 175th anniversary of the birth of G. G. Myasoyedov] (PDF) (in Russian). Третьяковская галерея. pp. 56–67.
- Khvorostov, A. S. (2012). Григорий Мясоедов [Grigory Myasoyedov]. Малая серия искусств (in Russian). М.: Арт-Родник. p. 96. ISBN 978-5-404-00241-6.
- Shuvalova, I. N. (1971). Мясоедов [Myasoyedov] (in Russian). Л.: Искусство, Ленинградское отделение. p. 144.
- Государственная Третьяковская галерея — каталог собрания / Я. В. Брук, Л. И. Иовлева. М.: Красная площадь, 2001. V. 4: Живопись второй половины XIX века, book 1, А—М. 528 p. ISBN 5-900743-56-X
- Письма художников Павлу Михайловичу Третьякову: 1870—1879 / Н. Г. Галкина, М. Н. Григорьева, Н. Л. Приймак. М.: Искусство, 1968. 558 p.
- Товарищество передвижных художественных выставок. Письма, документы. 1869—1899 / В. В. Андреева, М. В. Астафьева, С. Н. Гольдштейн, Н. Л. Приймак. М.: Искусство, 1987. 668 p.
- Catalogue de la section russe à l'Exposition universelle de Paris. September 12, 1878 – via gallica.bnf.fr.
