= In the Ploughed Field: Spring =

1820s painting by Alexey Venetsianov

- На пашне. Весна (Russian)
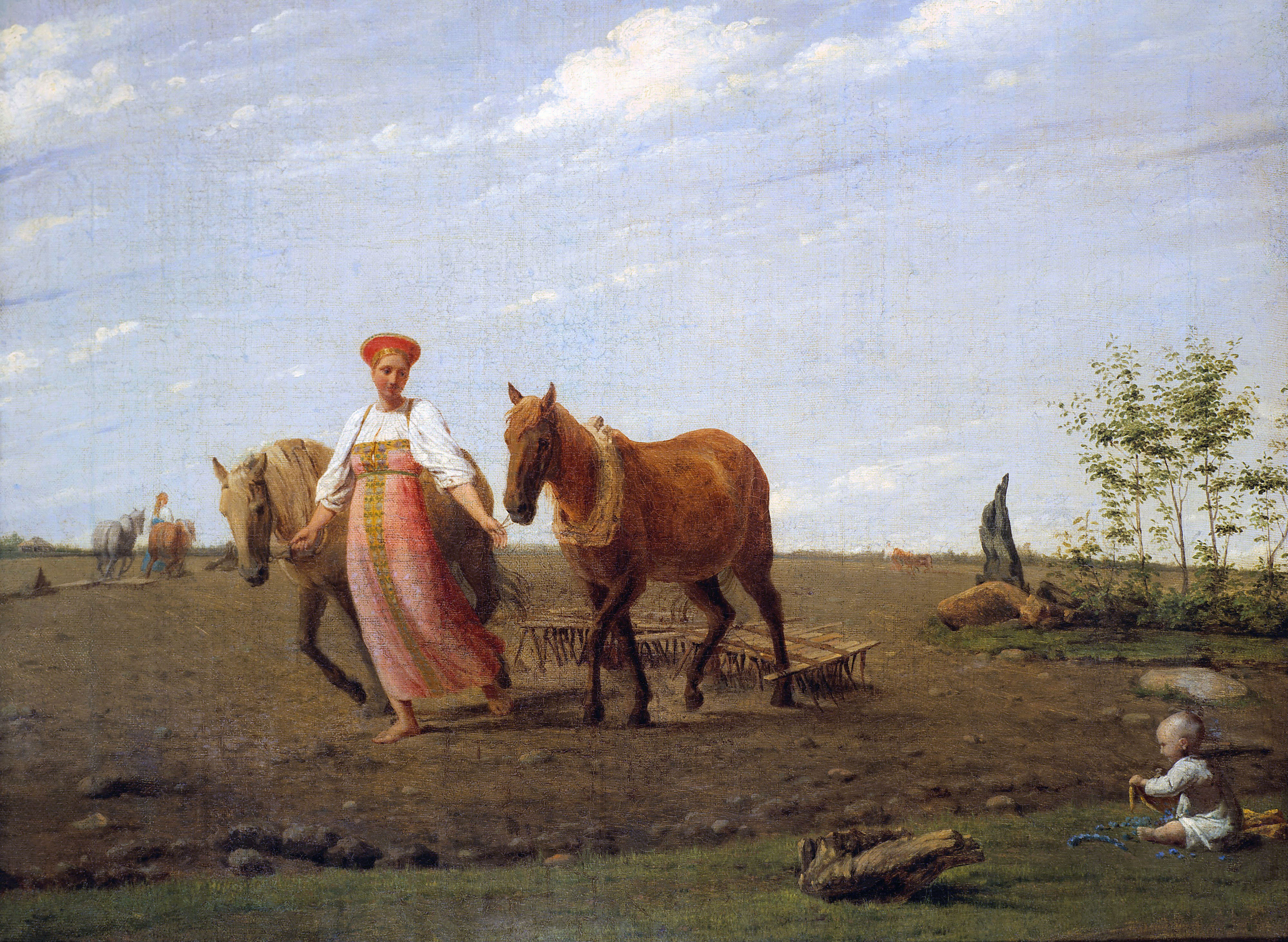
- Artist: Alexey Venetsianov
- Year: First half of 1820s
- Medium: Oil on canvas
- Dimensions: 51.2 cm × 65.5 cm (20.2 in × 25.8 in)
- Location: Tretyakov Gallery, Moscow

In the Ploughed Field: Spring (Note: The painting is also sometimes translated as Ploughing, Spring or In the Field: Spring) (Russian: На пашне. Весна, romanized: Na Pashne. Vesna) is an oil painting by Russian artist Alexey Venetsianov made in the first half of the 1820s. The painting depicts an elegantly dressed peasant mother leading two horses with a harrow while also keeping an eye on her child who is seated near the furrows. It has been in the Tretyakov Gallery in Moscow, Russia, since 1893, and is regarded as one of Venetsianov's greatest works.

The painting is part of Venetsianov's series depicting peasant labour. He worked on the painting in the Vyshnevolotsky Uyezd of Tver Governorate in the early 1820s. The history of the painting, starting from the 1840s, is unknown until Pavel Tretyakov purchased it for his gallery in 1893. Despite its small size, it is considered a masterpiece of the Tretyakov Gallery collection and is regarded by art historians as an integral part of Russian national culture's classical heritage.

== History ==
The precise date of the creation of In the Ploughed Field: Spring is disputed. In her 1949 monograph, Russian art critic Zinaida Fomicheva suggests that the painting was created in the 1810s, while Soviet art historian Aleksei Savinov suggested that the painting was created in the early 1830s in his 1955 book. This ambiguity stems from Venetsianov's refusal to sign or date any of his paintings. Nonetheless, modern researchers believe that In the Ploughed Field: Spring was created by Venetsianov in the first half of the 1820s, which is supported by the Tretyakov Gallery catalogue.

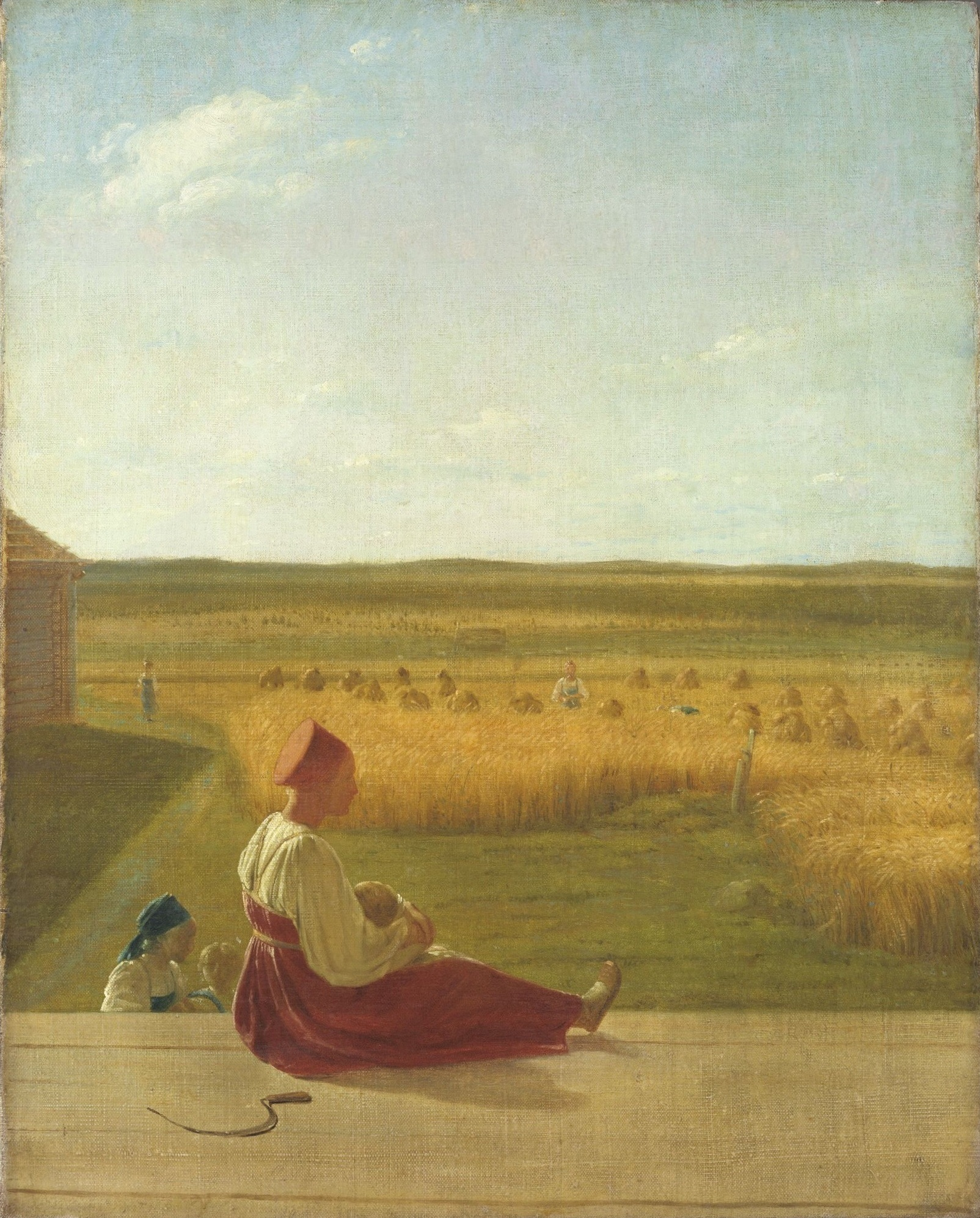
At the Harvest. Summer. mid-1820s

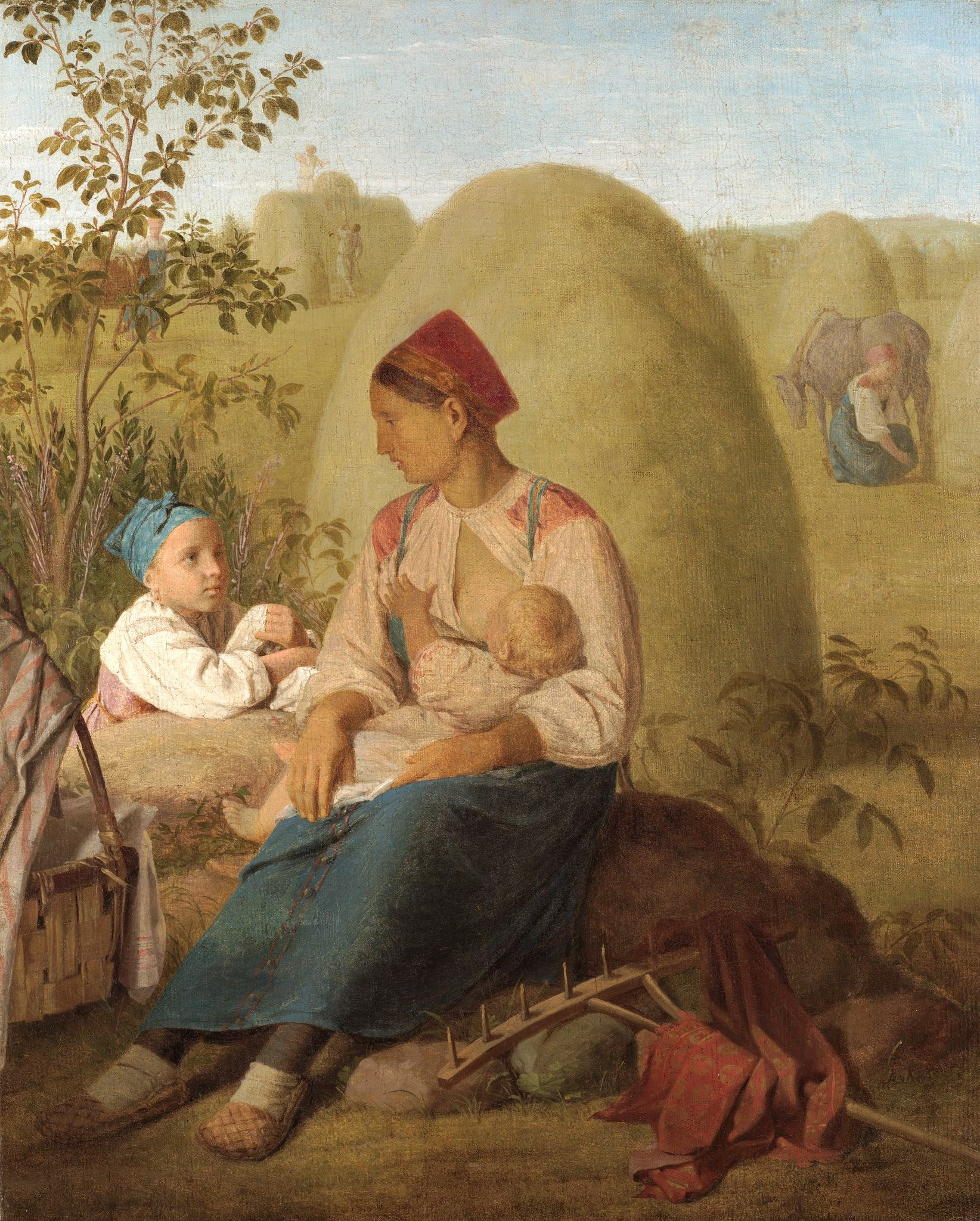
Haymaking. mid-1820s

In the Ploughed Field: Spring is the first painting in Venetsianov's series of paintings depicting peasant labour, which also includes the paintings At the Harvest. Summer and Haymaking. The series is sometimes referred to as the "Seasons" (spring, summer and autumn), and a fourth painting representing winter is thought to exist, but no evidence of such a painting has been found.

The majority of Venetsianov's peasant-themed artworks were created during his stay in the villages of Tronikha and Safonkovo in the Vyshnevolotsky Uyezd (both now part of the Venetsianovo village in the Udomelsky District of Tver Oblast). According to local historian Dmitry Podushkov, who researched Venetsianov's life, he lived in Tronikha from 1819 to 1832 before moving to Safonkovo. He spent the rest of his life in the Tver countryside and was at his most creative during this time.

The painting was known by various names in the first few decades after its completion. In the 1830s, it was titled Peasant Woman in the Field, Leading Horses (Крестьянка в поле, ведущая лошадей), and in 1838, it was titled Village Woman with Horses (Деревенская женщина с лошадьми). In 1840, it came to be known as Woman harrowing the field (Женщина, боронящая поле).

The history of the painting from the 1840s to 1893 and the identities of its first owners are unknown. It is only known that Pavel Tretyakov purchased the painting in 1893. Art critic Svetlana Stepanova writes: "The appearance of such a canvas as In the Ploughed Field: Spring seems to be a kind of mystery, if not a miracle. There is no mention of it either by the artist himself in his letters and autobiography or by his contemporaries. The previous owners of the painting and how Tretyakov acquired it are unknown."

== Subject and description ==
The canvas is both realistic and allegorical since it tries to represent an idealised image of the Russian land. Venetsianov is credited with establishing Russia's naturalist school of landscape painting, which is most prominent in In the Ploughed Field: Spring. The sky takes up the majority of the artwork, which Venetsianov carefully studied before painting in order to achieve the effect of three-dimensional clouds and their smooth flow in the artwork. The horizon line in the painting runs quite low and bends even lower on the right side of the canvas. This enables the artist to create the illusion of a large open space. Famous Russian landscape artists such as Mikhail Vrubel and Viktor Vasnetsov later imitated this technique.

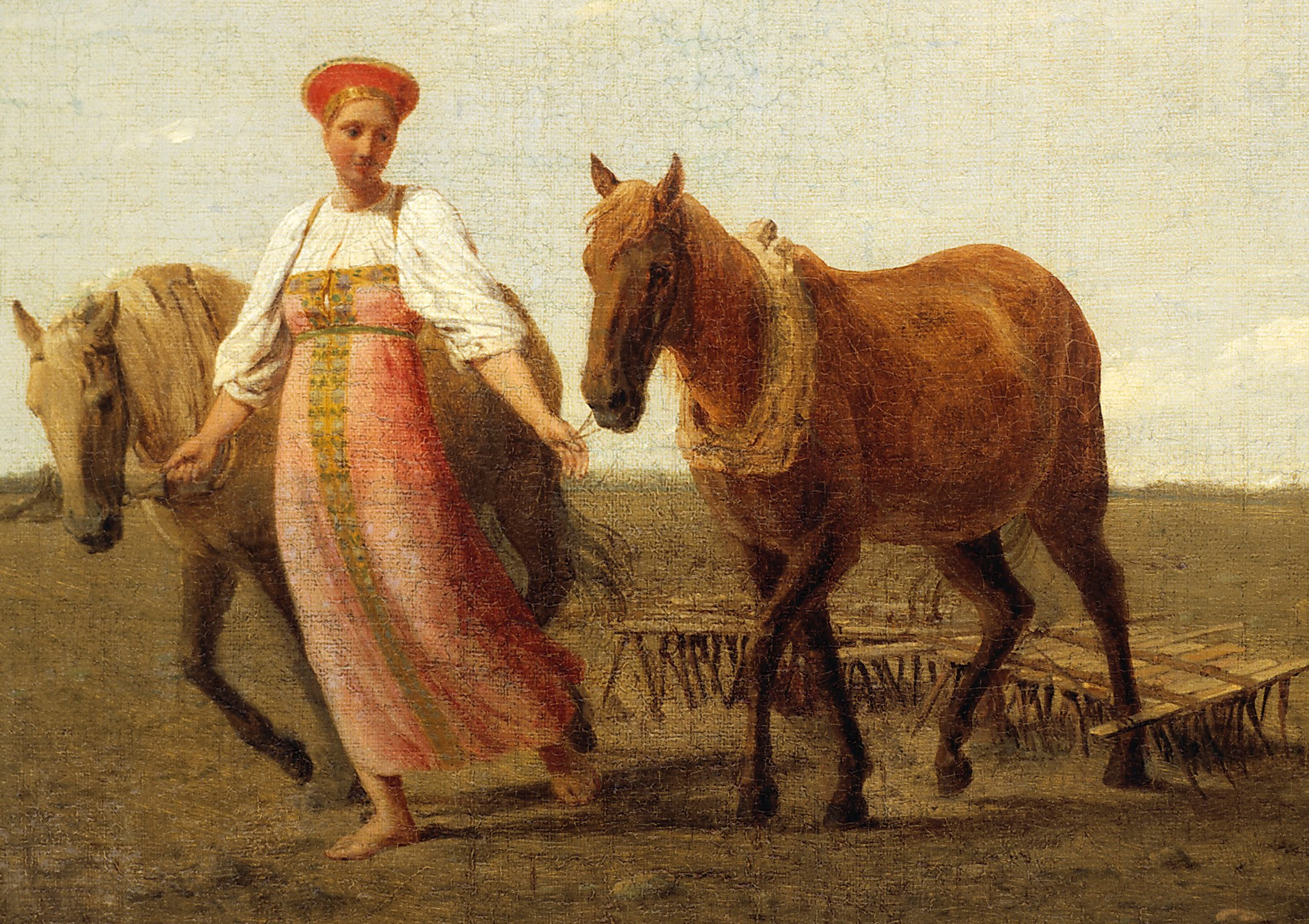
In the Ploughed Field: Spring detail

The painting's central figure is a young peasant mother leading two horses while watching over her child seated near the furrows in the lower right corner of the canvas. The peasant mother is dressed elegantly in a sarafan and a kokoshnik, both of which are inappropriate for agricultural work. She walks across the field gracefully, barely touching the ground, as if hovering over it, as if she is the goddess Flora, personifying Spring; this impression is reinforced by the fact that the woman figure appears to be proportionally larger than that of the horses. Venetsianov did not delve into the psychological symbolism of spring in the peasant woman's face because he did not paint small details on it, but instead concentrated on the execution of the perfect plasticity of the entire portrait, melodies of rhythms, and consistency of tones, which together give rise to a feeling of sublime beauty. Her body language also closely resembles a Russian folk dance due to the position of her feet and outstretched arms.

Some decried Venetsianov's overly elegant and expensive clothing for a peasant woman working in the fields. This, however, was not the artist's "invention". In older times, the first day of ploughing was considered a holiday by Russian peasants, so they would dress up for the occasion. Some researchers also drew parallels between the peasant woman in In the Ploughed Field: Spring and Ivan Argunov's Portrait of an Unknown Woman in Russian Costume, which was created several decades earlier.

The canvas's plot is not entirely idyllic. The viewer realises that the young mother only sees her child when she is passing him with horses. Figures of other ploughing peasants can be seen in the distance, to the left and right. This enables the artist to not only create the illusion of spatiality and demonstrate the scale of the field, but also to demonstrate that everyone is preoccupied with work. Some silhouettes are translucent, allowing the previously painted background to shine through. Uprooted stumps and other details emphasise the realism and "non-fictional" nature of the painting's landscape.

Bluish tones play an important role in the colour scheme of the artwork, but rather than the usual coldness that the colour blue adds, the painting remains warm and joyful; the soft green of freshly blossoming foliage serves as an important component in making the image look warm. The artist uses whitened, brightened tones in the upper, whitish-blue portion of the image, while greenish ochre colours dominate in the lower portion. Venetsianov achieved a harmonious transition of tones from intense in the foreground to calmer and calmer, fading in the zone where earth and sky meet.

== Reception ==
In his book The History of Russian Painting in the Nineteenth Century, the artist and critic Alexandre Benois expressed his admiration for the painting.

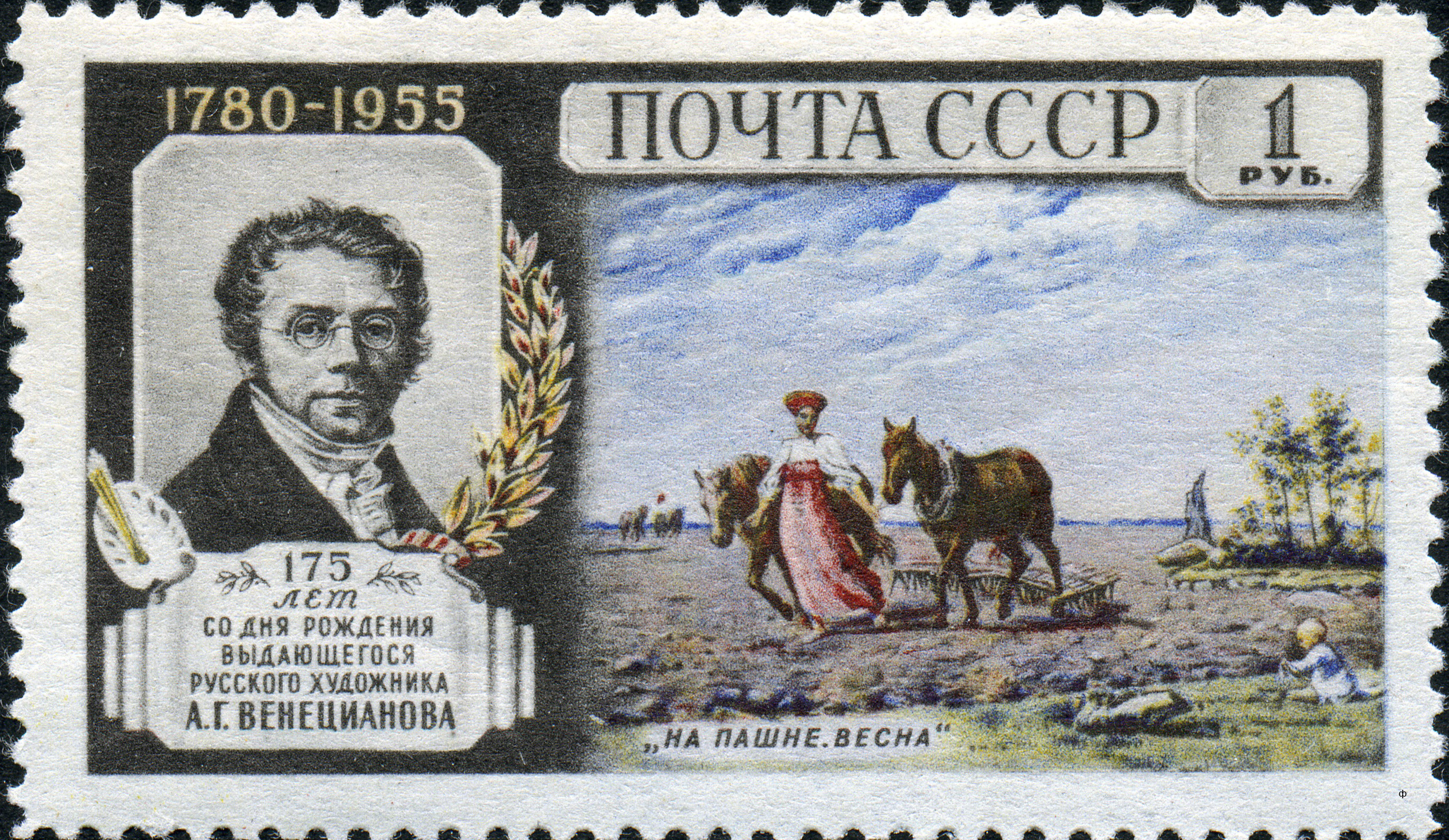
In the Ploughed Field: Spring on a postage stamp of the USSR in 1955

The paintings In the Ploughed Field: Spring and At the Harvest. Summer were described as "beautiful" and "deep" by art critic Alexei Savinov, who wrote that "they are distinguished by their remarkable truthfulness, the absence of conventionality in composition, colour, and characterization of images; the people depicted in them live in their own world". In his opinion, Venetsianov was able to "transmit the true poetry of motherhood, to show the charm of a young mother" in In the Ploughed Field: Spring. Savinov praised the artist's skill in this artwork, writing, "by the nobility of his thought, the strength of his feelings, the perfection of execution, this small painting by Venetsianov belongs to the classical heritage of national culture".

According to art critic Mikhail Alpatov, In the Ploughed Field: Spring should not be regarded as a typical genre painting; rather, it should be regarded as a "picture song", not a "picture story". As a reason for this, he mentioned the elegant sarafan, the "dancing gait" of the peasant woman across a freshly ploughed field, and the ratio of her height to the size of horses.

According to art historian Dmitry Sarabyanov, Venetsianov "was the first to discover Russian nature (in painting)—and above all earth and sky—in natural being and immediately recognised perhaps the most significant aspects". On the one hand, the artist "develops the foreground, writing loosened earth, herbs, stones, leaves," and on the other, "the earth appears to be moving apart to infinity, going beyond the picture field, without being limited on the sides backstage". On Venetsianov's canvas, these seemingly opposing qualities are harmoniously combined, not excluding, but complementing one another.

== Literature ==
- Алпатов, Михаил Владимирович (1967). Этюды по истории русского искусства (in Russian). Vol. 2. Moscow: Искусство.
- Бенуа, Александр Николаевич (1995). История русской живописи в XIX веке (in Russian). Moscow: Республика. ISBN 978-5-250-02524-9.
- Иовлева, Лидия Ивановна (2001). Shedevry GosudarstvШедевры Государственной Третьяковской галереи. Русское искусство XII — начала XX века: живопись, рисунок (in Russian). Moscow: Трилистник. ISBN 978-5-89480-033-2.
- Кожевникова, Тамара (2001). Венецианов (in Russian). Moscow: Белый город. ISBN 978-5-7793-0248-7.
- Королёва, С. (2010). Алексей Гаврилович Венецианов (Великие художники, том 46) (in Russian). Vol. 48. Moscow: Комсомольская правда. ISBN 978-5-7475-0023-5.
- Леонтьева, Галина Константиновна (1988). Алексей Гаврилович Венецианов (in Russian). Leningrad: Искусство. ISBN 978-5-210-00022-4.
- Петинова, Елена Фоминична (2001). Русские художники XVIII — начала XX века (in Russian). Saint Petersburg: Аврора. ISBN 978-5-7300-0714-7.
- Пигарёв, Кирилл Васильевич (1966). Русская литература и изобразительное искусство (XVIII — первая четверть XIX века). Очерки (in Russian). Moscow: Наука.
- Подушков, Дмитрий Леонидович (2013). Художник А. Г. Венецианов в Удомельском крае. Удомельские ученики (in Russian). Vyshny Volochyok: Ирида-прос.
- Савинов, Алексей Николаевич (1955). Алексей Гаврилович Венецианов. Жизнь и творчество (in Russian). Moscow: Искусство.
- Сарабьянов, Дмитрий Владимирович (1998). Русская живопись: пробуждение памяти (in Russian). Moscow: Искусствознание.
- Степанова, Светлана Степановна (2021). "Поэт «простых предметов русских»". Алексей Венецианов. Пространство, свет и тишина (in Russian). Moscow: Tretyakov Gallery. pp. 8–52. ISBN 978-5-89580-340-0.
- Ткач, Михаил Иванович (2002). Энциклопедия пейзажа (in Russian). Moscow: ОЛМА-ПРЕСС. ISBN 978-5-948-49136-3.
- Фомичёва, Зинаида Ивановна (1949). Творчество А. Г. Венецианова в первой половине XIX века (in Russian). Leningrad: State Russian Museum.
- Шумова, Марина Николаевна (1978). Русская живопись первой половины XIX века (in Russian). Moscow: Искусство.
- Брук, Яков Владимирович; Иовлева, Лидия Ивановна (2005). Государственная Третьяковская галерея — каталог собрания (in Russian). Vol. 3. Moscow: СканРус. ISBN 978-5-93221-081-9.
- Figes, Orlando (2003). Natasha's dance a cultural history of Russia. London: Penguin. ISBN 978-0-14-029796-6.
- Sarabyanov, D. V. (1996). "Venetsianov, Aleksey". The dictionary of art. Vol. 32. New York: Grove. ISBN 978-1-884446-00-9.
- Gray, Rosalind Polly (1999). "The Real and the Ideal in the Work of Aleksei Venetsianov". The Russian Review. 58 (4): 655–675. doi:10.1111/0036-0341.00099. ISSN 0036-0341.
- Jackson, David (2006). The Wanderers and critical realism in nineteenth-century Russian painting. Manchester: Manchester University Press. ISBN 978-0-7190-6434-0.
- Sarabyanov, D. V. (1990). Russian art: from neoclassicism to the avant garde, 1800-1917: painting - sculpture - architecture. New York: H.N. Abrams. ISBN 978-0-8109-3750-5.
- Stites, Richard (2005). Serfdom, society, and the arts in imperial Russia : the pleasure and the power. New Haven, Conn.: Yale University Press. ISBN 978-0-300-10889-7.
