= Valckenier =

Valckenier is a surname. Notable people with the surname include:

- Adriaan Valckenier (1695–1751), Dutch accountant and Governor-General of the Dutch East Indies
- Gillis Valckenier (1623–1680), Regent and Mayor of Amsterdam
- Jan Valckenier Suringar (1864–1932), Dutch botanist

== See also ==
- Valkenier
