= Ivan the Terrible and His Son Ivan =

1885 painting by Ilya Repin

Ivan the Terrible and His Son Ivan on 16 November 1581
- Иван Грозный и сын его Иван 16 ноября 1581 года (Russian)
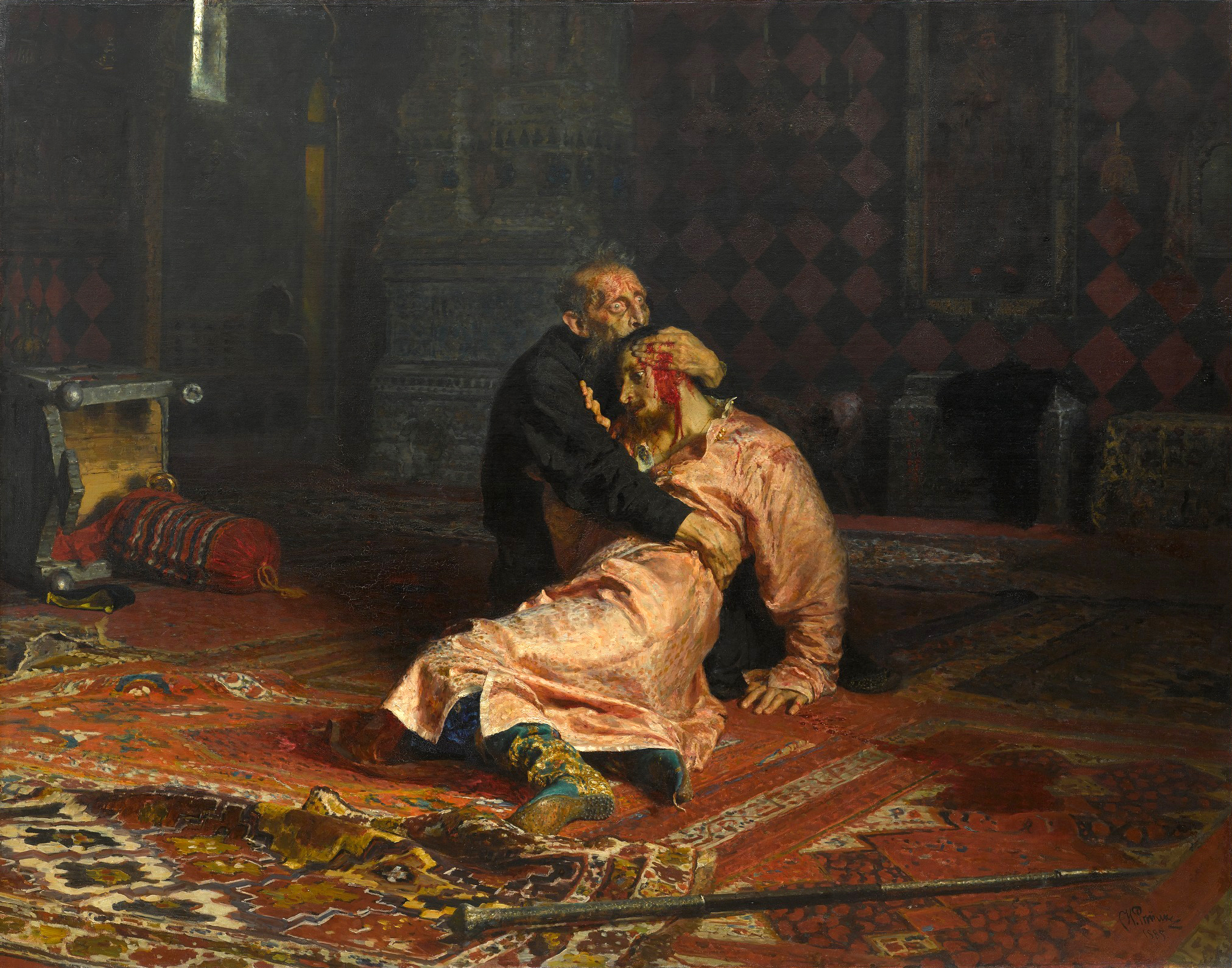
- Artist: Ilya Repin
- Year: 1883–1885
- Medium: Oil on canvas
- Dimensions: 199.5 cm × 254 cm (78.5 in × 100 in)
- Location: Tretyakov Gallery, Moscow

Ivan the Terrible and His Son Ivan on 16 November 1581 (Note: The work is variously referred to as Ivan the Terrible and His Son Ivan, with or without the date, or Ivan the Terrible Kills His Son.) is a painting by Russian realist artist Ilya Repin made between 1883 and 1885. It depicts the grief-stricken Russian tsar Ivan the Terrible cradling his dying son, the Tsarevich Ivan Ivanovich, shortly after Ivan the Terrible had dealt a fatal blow to his son's head in a fit of anger. The painting portrays the anguish and remorse on the face of the elder Ivan and the shock and heartbreak of the dying Tsarevich, who sheds a tear at the unexpected betrayal and shock of having been killed at his father's hands.

Repin used Grigoriy Myasoyedov, his friend and fellow artist, as the model for Ivan the Terrible, and writer Vsevolod Garshin for the Tsarevich. In 1885, upon completion of the oil-on-canvas work, Repin sold it to Pavel Tretyakov for display in his Tretyakov Gallery in Moscow.

It has been called one of Russia's most famous and controversial paintings, and is normally on display in the Tretyakov Gallery.

== Background and inspiration ==
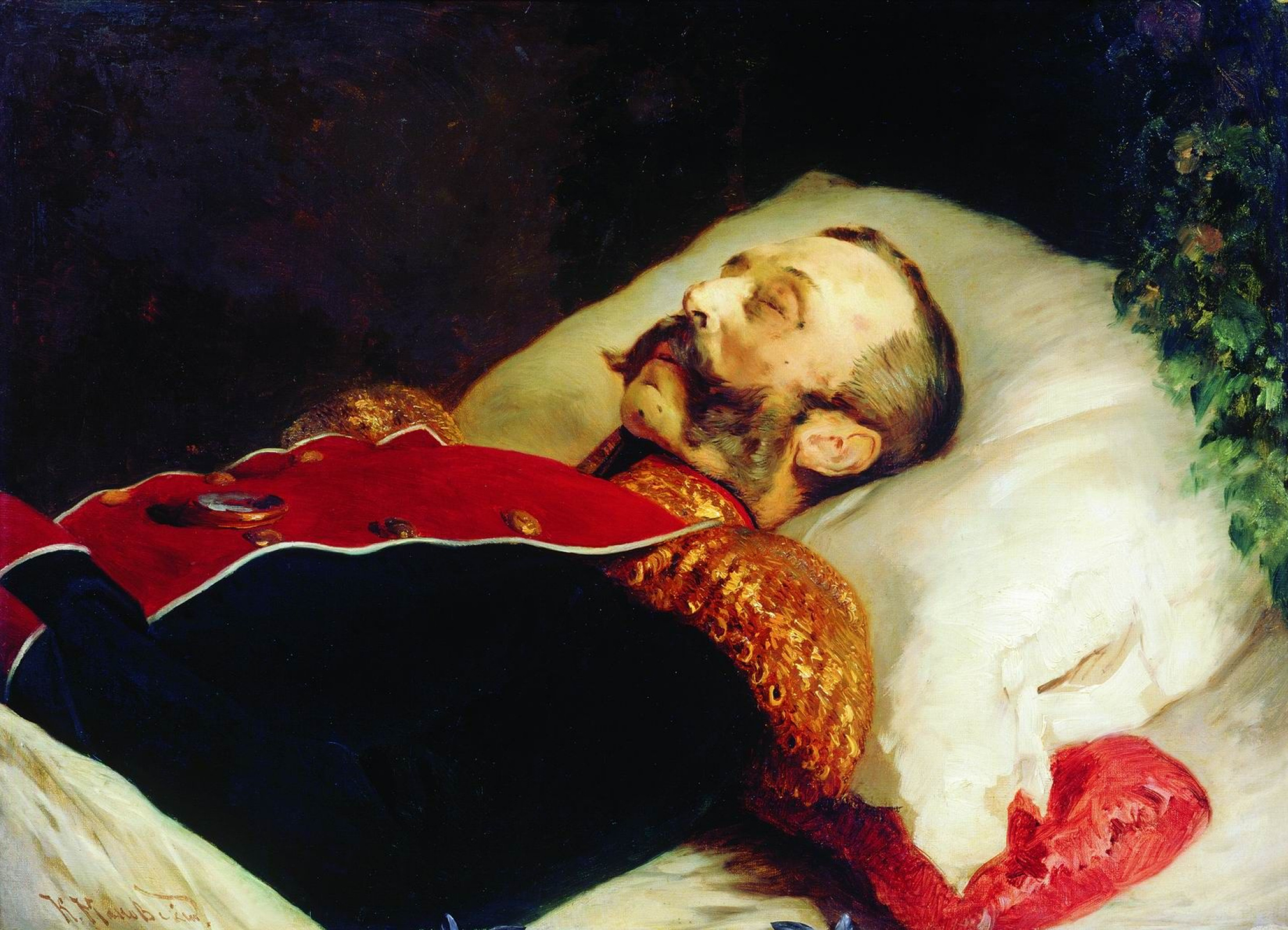
Emperor Alexander II on His Deathbed. Konstantin Makovsky.

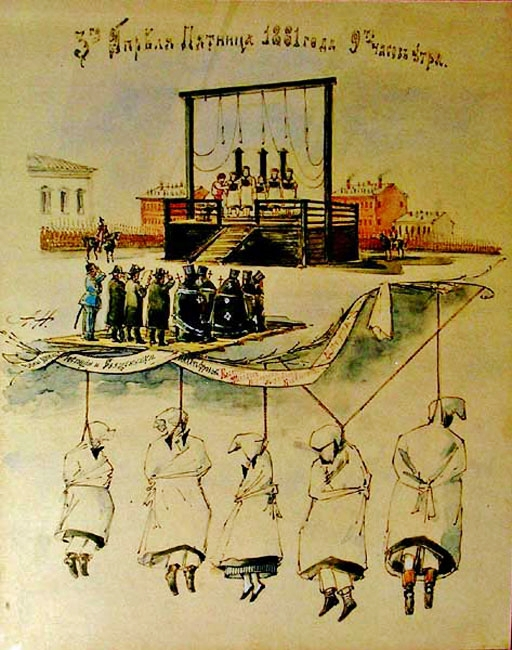
Execution of the Pervomartovtsy. A.A. Nesvetevich.

Repin began working on the painting in Moscow. A first overall sketch, with the character of the Tsar turned to his right, dates from 1882. The idea of the painting, according to Repin, is linked to his confrontation with the themes of violence, revenge and blood during the political events of 1881; additional sources of inspiration were the music of Nikolai Rimsky-Korsakov and the bullfights Repin had witnessed during a trip to Western Europe in 1883.

=== Political violence ===
On 13 March 1881 in Saint Petersburg, the reformist Russian Tsar Alexander II was assassinated by a bomb thrown by Ignacy Hryniewiecki, a member of the revolutionary organization Narodnaya Volya. The bomb also seriously injured Hryniewiecki, who died a few hours later. Hryniewiecki's accomplices, the Pervomartovtsy, were executed on 13 April 1881. Repin, who visited Saint Petersburg in mid-February 1881 for the opening of the Wanderers' exhibition, was present when the tsar was killed. He returned there in April and attended the execution of the attack's perpetrators and their accomplices.

Repin's friend, poet Vasily Kamensky, wrote in his memoirs Repin had told him "how he had witnessed the public execution of the Pervomartovtsy" (Zhelyabov, Perovskaya, Kibalchich, Mikhailov and Rysakov). "Ah, as it was nightmare times," – sighed Repin – "complex, appalling. I even remember each board on the breasts, with the inscription "regicide". I even remember Zhelyabov's gray pants, Perovskaya's black hat".

Several of Repin's next paintings; Refusal of confession (Отказ от исповеди; 1881), Arrest of a propagandist (Арест пропагандиста, 1882) and They Did Not Expect Him (Не ждали; 1884–1888); were devoted to the Pervomartovtsy. He also wrote several times in his memoirs about this period of his creations: "This year followed like a trace of blood, our feelings were bruised by the horrors of the contemporary world, it was frightening to confront it: it will end badly! ... We had to look for a way out at this key moment in history." For Repin, there was a link between the events of 1881 and the scene represented in Ivan the Terrible and His Son Ivan on 16 November 1581 from exactly 300 years earlier, in which the Tsar is the murderer.

=== Music of Rimsky-Korsakov ===
Another inspiration for the painting was the symphonic suite Antar, which was composed by the Russian Nikolai Rimsky-Korsakov and is composed of four movements; the opening movement, vengeance, power, and love.

The music of Antar's bloody second movement inspired Repin the most; he said in his memoirs:

In Moscow in 1881, while I was listening to a new piece by Rimsky-Korsakov, Vengeance ("Месть"). This sound wave took possession of me, and I thought, that I could not embody the state of the soul I had known under the influence of this music in a painting. I then remembered Tsar Ivan.

=== Trip to Europe ===
Repin's painting is also striking because of its representation of blood, which is seeping from the Tsarevich's temple and remains on the floor in a puddle after his father has picked him up. According to Repin's memoirs, he was influenced by his 1883 trip to Europe, where he witnessed bullfights:

Misfortune, death, murder and blood make up a hole that draws you into it with force. At the same time, there are so many bloody paintings in all the exhibitions. And I, probably overtaken by all this bloodiness, on my return home, started the bloody scene of Ivan the Terrible with his son. And this painting had a great success.

== Creation ==
According to Repin, the design and painting of the canvas were a lengthy process:

I painted in tears, I was tortured, I tormented myself, I corrected again and again what I had painted, I hid it, in a sickly disappointment, no longer believing in my strength, I erased what I had painted. I had already erased, and I was attacking the canvas again. Every minute was terrible to me. I was disappointed with this painting, I hid it. And it made the same impression on my friends. But something pushed me towards it, and again I was working on it.

The painting depicts one of the rooms of the Chambers of the Romanov Boyars from the 17th century while the accessories, throne, mirror, and kaftan were painted at the Kremlin Armoury. The chest is part of the collections of the Rumyantsev Museum.

Most of Repin's work involved the choice of models; he sought the faces he needed from acquaintances and passers-by. The models for Ivan the Terrible were the painter Grigoriy Myasoyedov and the composer Pavel Blaramberg, while the landscape painter Vladimir Menk and writer Vsevolod Garshin modelled for Tsarevich Ivan Ivanovich. When he was asked about choosing Garshin, Repin replied:

There is a predestination in Garshin's face that struck me. He has the face of a man irreparably condemned to perish. This is what was needed for my Tsarevich.

Sketches and portraits of the models

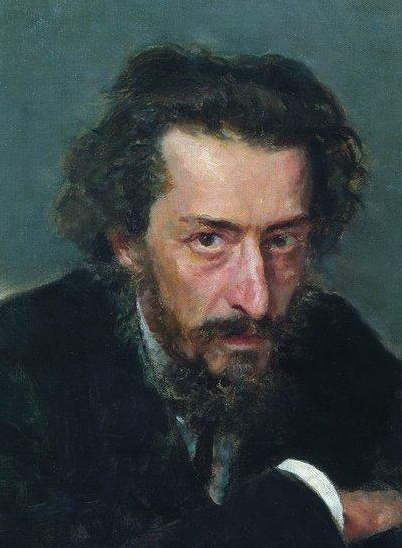
Portrait of composer Pavel Blaramberg (1884).

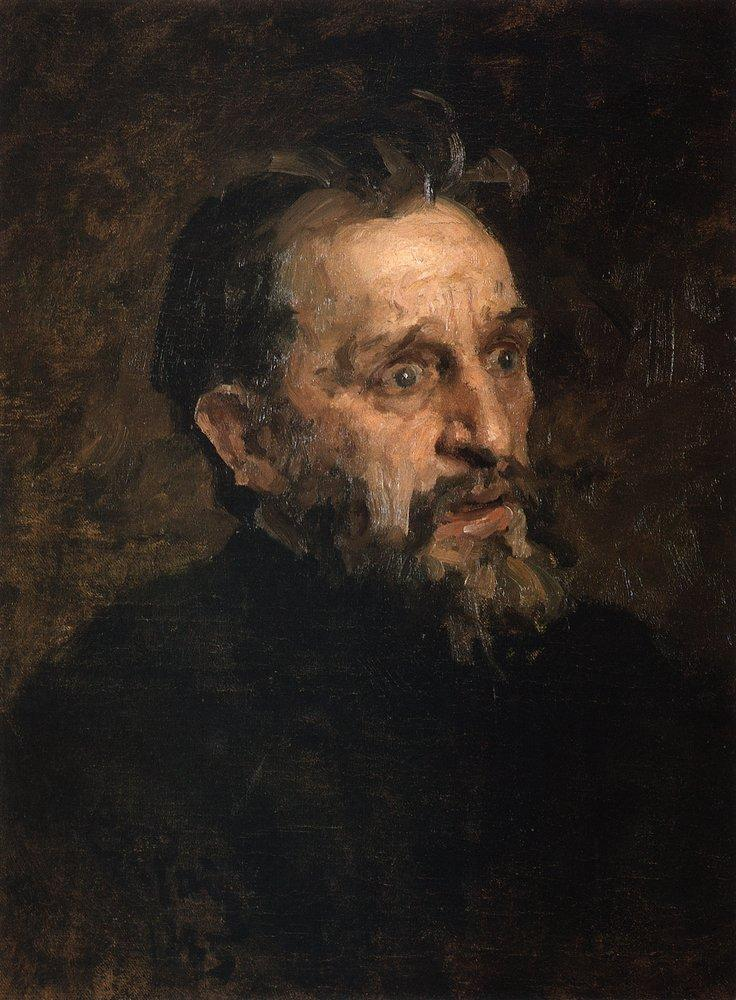
Portrait of the painter Grigoriy Myasoyedov (1883).

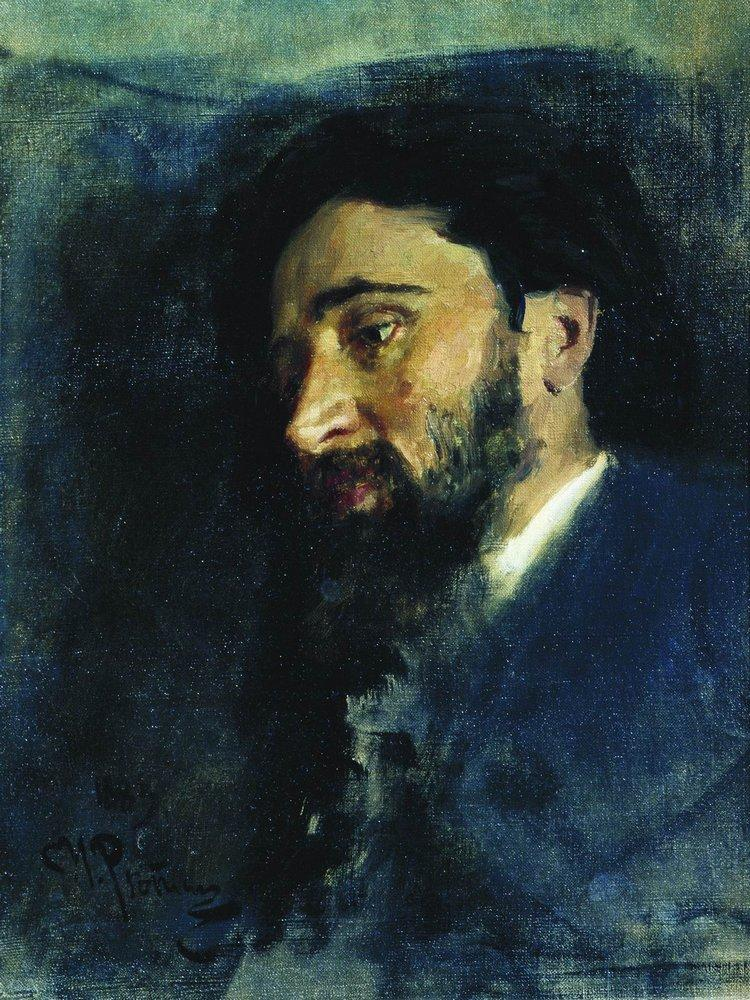
Portrait of the writer Vsevolod Garshin (1883).

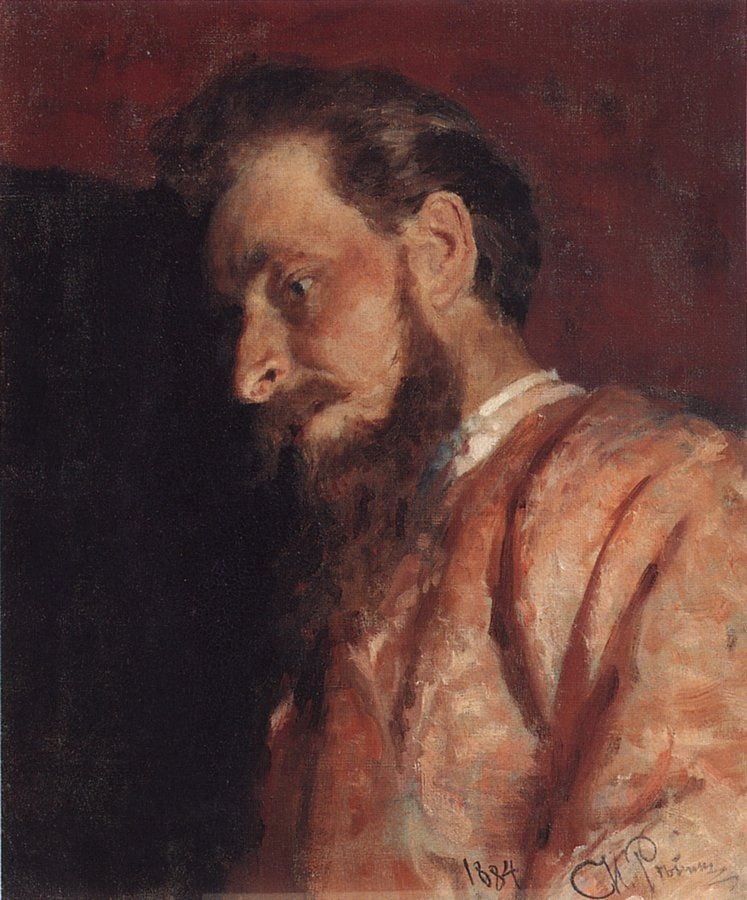
Portrait of the painter Vladimir Menk (1884).
Ivan the Terrible Kills His Son – detail

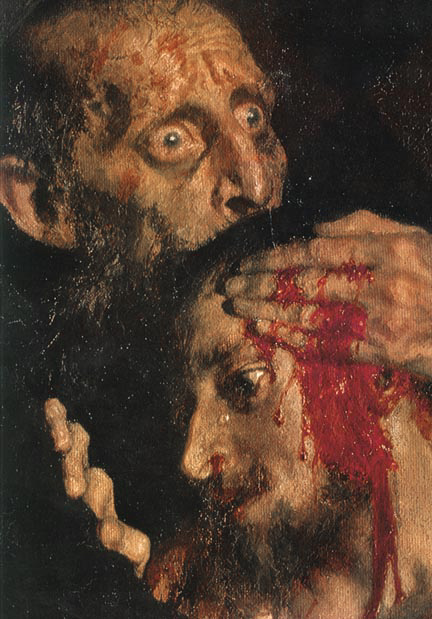

According to Polish-American art historian Elizabeth Kridl Valkenier, the incorporation of Garshin's face completes and allows her to be fully satisfied with the painting.

== Analysis ==
=== Moment represented ===
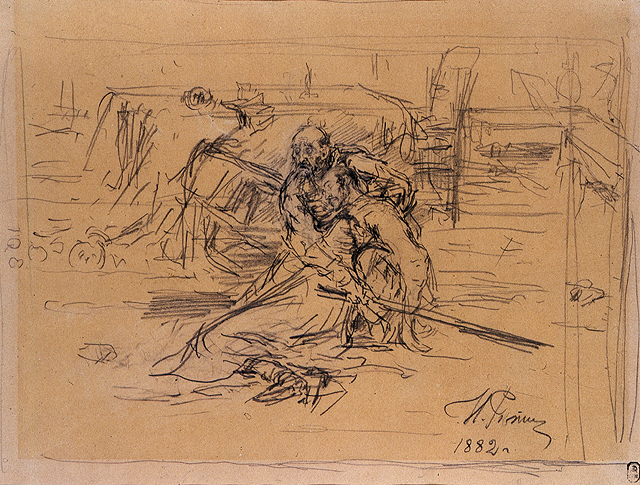
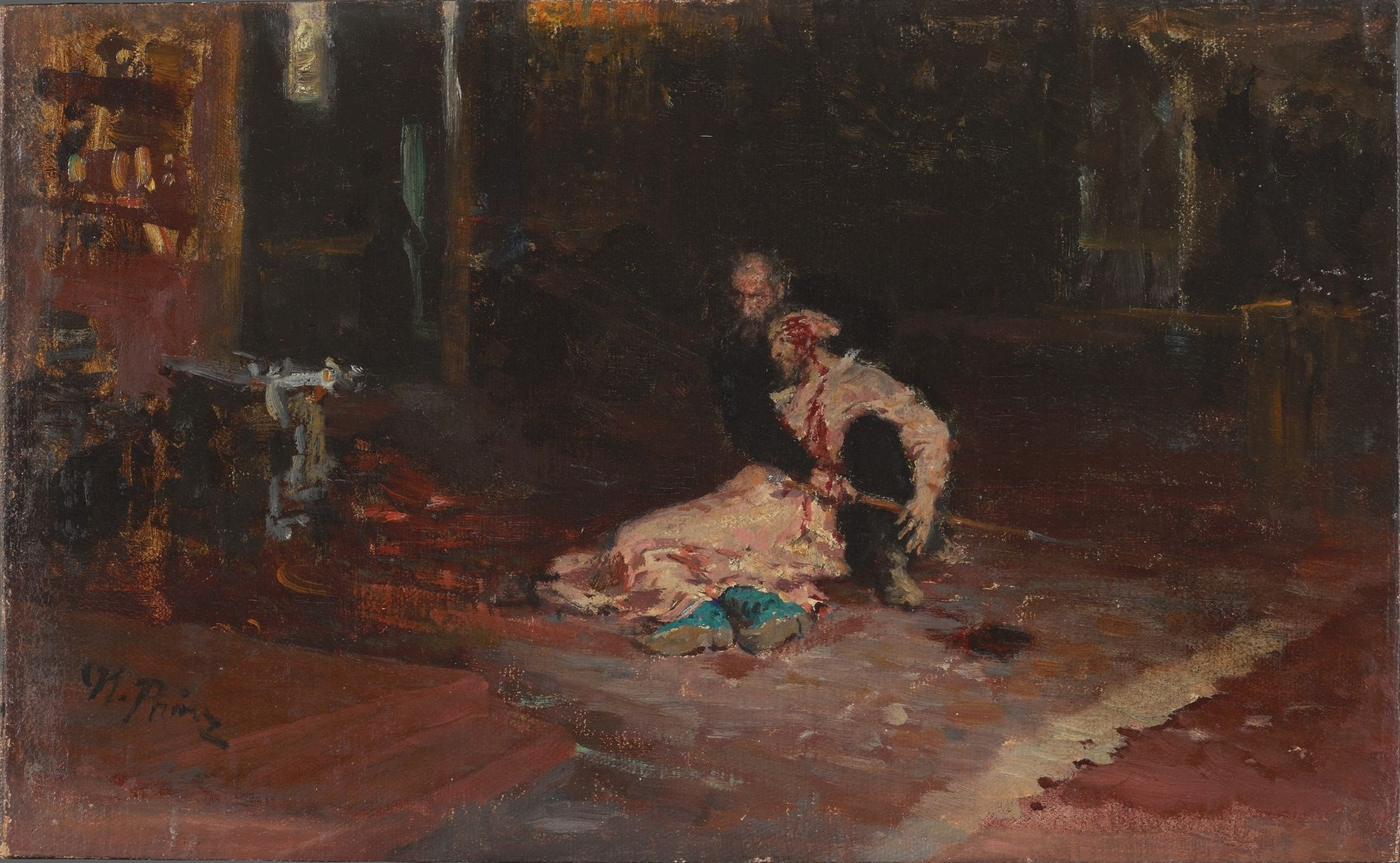
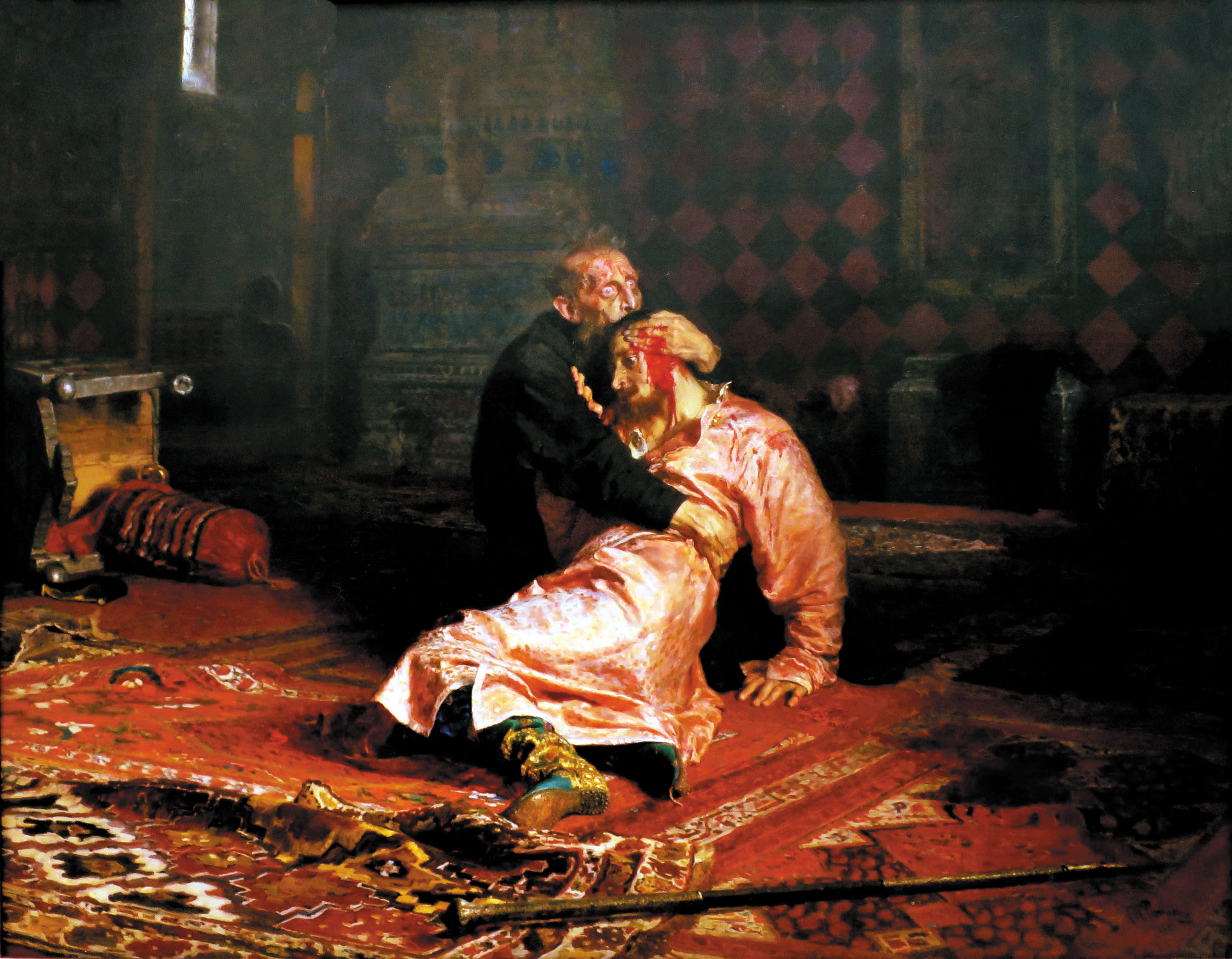
From top to bottom:
- pencil sketch (1882 – 20.7 × 27.1 cm);
- oil sketch (1883, 1899 – 22.2 × 36 cm);
- Final version (1884–1888).

Although the painting is sometimes called Ivan the Terrible Kills His Son, Repin did not paint the moment at which the Tsar hits the Tsarevich. The work does not represent violence but its resolution. Ivan the Terrible holds his son. His eyes "bulging with horror, despair and madness", he embraces him by the waist. Tsarevich Ivan, weeping, gently waves his hand.

Two modifications to the preliminary sketches show the distance established by the painter with the altercation; the sceptre with which the Tsar strikes his son's temple is in his hand in the first sketches while in the final painting, it is on the floor in front of them. The bloodstain where the Tsarevich's head rests on the floor, which is very visible in the oil sketch Repin made in 1883, and which he kept and resumed later, is erased in the shadows of the final painting. Ivan Ivanovich's dress no longer has a long bloodstain. The represented moment becomes one of remorse, forgiveness and love. The painting also shows, in its centre, the reality and the irreversibility of the tsar's act: the blood flows from his son's temple and the attempt Ivan the Terrible makes to contain it with his left hand is hopeless.

=== Description and composition ===
The painting's 199.5 cm × 254 cm (6 ft 7 in × 8 ft 4 in) canvas is one of Repin's largest works; its dimensions are comparable to those of the Barge Haulers on the Volga and the Religious Procession in Kursk Governorate.

The two characters are crisscrossed with each other in the centre of the painting. They are depicted in a twilight and stand out from both the foreground of the canvas and the darker background. The gesture with which Ivan the Terrible hugs and supports his son's waist is reminiscent of the paintings The Return of the Prodigal Son and David and Jonathan by Dutch painter Rembrandt, which Repin studied and admired since his formative years, and are housed in the Hermitage Museum.

The construction of the painting is based on objects and pieces of furniture that are distributed around the characters: the crumpled red carpets on the floor, the Tsarevich's boots, the sceptre, the throne that was overturned during the argument, one of the ornamental balls that sparkles at the level of the son's eyes, and his cushion. Behind the figures, other pieces of furniture, such as the stove, the mirror of the Armor Museum and the chest of the Rumyantsev Palace, are less discernible. The back wall of the room is partly covered with a red-and-black diamond pattern. At the top left is a narrow bay.

=== Colours and material ===
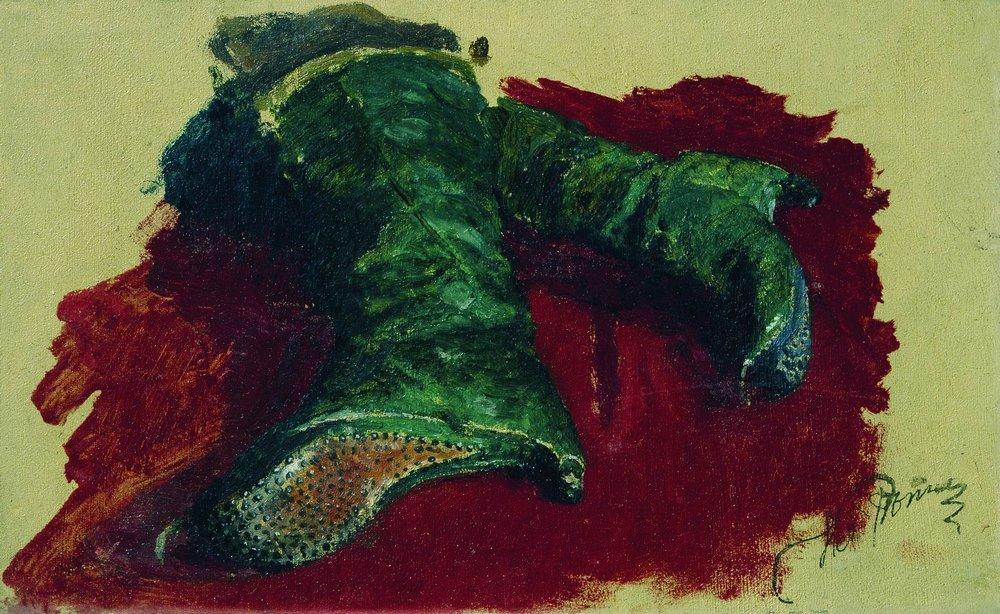
Sketch of the Tsarevich's boots (1883).

Repin wrote he refused "the acrobatics of the brush and painting for the sake of painting" and that "the beauty, the touch or the virtuosity of the brush" was not the only important things because he had always pursued "the essential: the body, as a body". Ivan the Terrible and His Son Ivan is "painted with such a diversity of craftsmanship and with such a rich palette of dark chords" that it is, according to Russian painter and art critic Ivan Kramskoi, an "authentic orchestra". An "intense red" or "blood red", and "thick and saturated crimson red" predominates. It is painted with pure colour, with no additions, and then reworked by the painter with an extraordinary diversity of shades.

The scarlet red of the blood flowing from the wound on the Tsarevich's temple stands out, as do the reflections on the folds of his kaftan, and finally the dark-red puddle of blood on the red carpet, and this tension of colours resonates with the tragedy depicted on the canvas. In the centre, the magnificence of the Tsarevich's kaftan contrasts with the darkness of Ivan the Terrible's black coat. Repin breaks this combination of blood red, pink and dark-brown tones with the complementary tones of the green of the Tsarevich's boots and the deep-blue of his velvet trousers. White light, "cold and weak", which penetrates through a narrow bay, attenuates this tension of colours and further reinforces the dramatic tension of the scene.

=== Symbolic scope ===
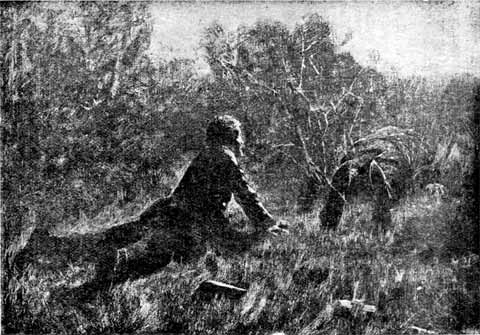
Illustration by painter Doubrovsky from Vsevolod Garchine's short story "Four Days". The writer's first work, it exhibits the interior monologue of a soldier wounded and left for dead on the battlefield for four days, face to face with the corpse of a Turkish soldier he has just killed. His deep empathy for all beings is already there.

For Repin and his contemporaries, the painting's first symbolic function is to express the existence of violence and moral rejection, which must be the object. According to Ivan Kramskoi; "it seems that a human being, after having carefully looked at this painting, even if only once, will be forever protected from the wild beast he has, as they say, in him".

The representation of the aftermath of the father's altercation with his son is a historical episode and illustrates a person's "eternal" capacity to physically harm their neighbour. The painting can be understood as a pictorial parable of the commandment "Thou shalt not kill".

The picture also seemed to approach a more-particularly religious inspiration, showing "Christian love and forgiveness" can repair crime, even filicide. The tsarevich's gesture and face are "almost like that of an icon", and the tear that runs down the wing of his nose seems to depict forgiveness. The similarity of the gesture of Ivan the Terrible's right arm with those of the figures in the two Rembrandt paintings also aligns with this position.

In the interpretation of the work, the personality of the writer Vsevolod Garshin provides additional details. In this period, Repin used Garshin as a model in several other paintings, including Portrait (1884) and the large painting They Did Not Expect Him, in which Garshin poses for the main character. Work on They Did Not Expect Him began in 1884 and ended the year of Garshin's suicide in 1888.

Repin appreciated Vsevolod Garshin, whom he considered an "incarnation of the divine" during their friendship and after his death. He wrote "his pensive eyes, often mixed with tears provoked by some injustice, his humble and delicate attitude, his angelic personality, with the purity of a dove, were those of a God". Repin's painting refers to Garshin's physical features, his personality and his deeply peaceful thought.

=== A representation of power ===
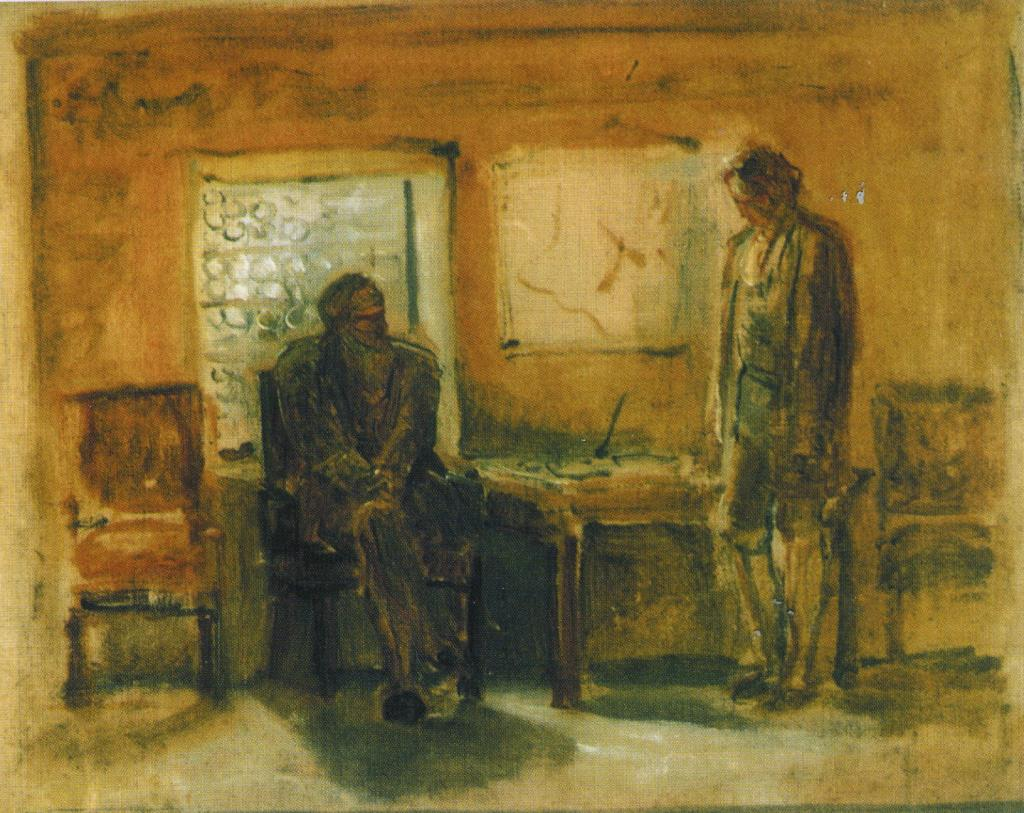
Nikolai Ge – Sketch for Peter the Great interrogates Tsarevich Alexis in Peterhof (1871).

The political significance of the painting cannot be eluded because of the reactions to which it was immediately the subject. Repin combined Ivan the Terrible's killing of his son with the assassination of Alexander II. Repin and Russian art critics did not expand upon this point; however French critics did. According to Alain Besançon, the tsarevich's murder by the tsar is a central scene of the Russian myth, which Repin was the first to represent: the history of Russia would be built on the sacrifice of sons killed by their fathers.

Pierre Gonneau supports a converging position, stressing this sacrificial vision refers "to the symbolic roots of the monarchy because the sacrificed tsarevich finds himself in a position to embody the forces opposing the authority of the tsar". It makes a link with the trial of Tsarevich Alexis, son of Peter the Great, and his death as a result of torture. This other conflict between a father and his son is the theme of Nikolai Ge's 1871 painting Peter the Great Interrogating the Tsarevich Alexei at Peterhof.

=== 1909 version ===
In 1909, on a commission from the industrialist and collector Stepan Ryabushinsky, Repin painted a second version of Ivan the Terrible and His Son Ivan, which he called Filicide (Сыноубийца). It is on display at Voronezh Museum of Fine Arts. The second version was painted 25 years later than the first. In this version, Repin added a female character in the background and unveiled more colours than in the original painting, taking it in a more "luxuriant" direction, while Tsar Ivan's face is collapsed in grief.

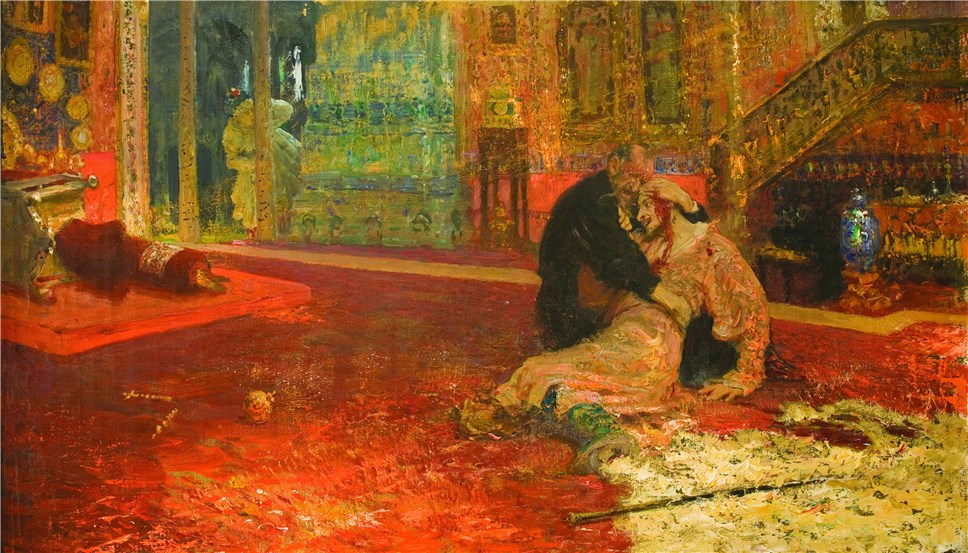
Filicide (1909).

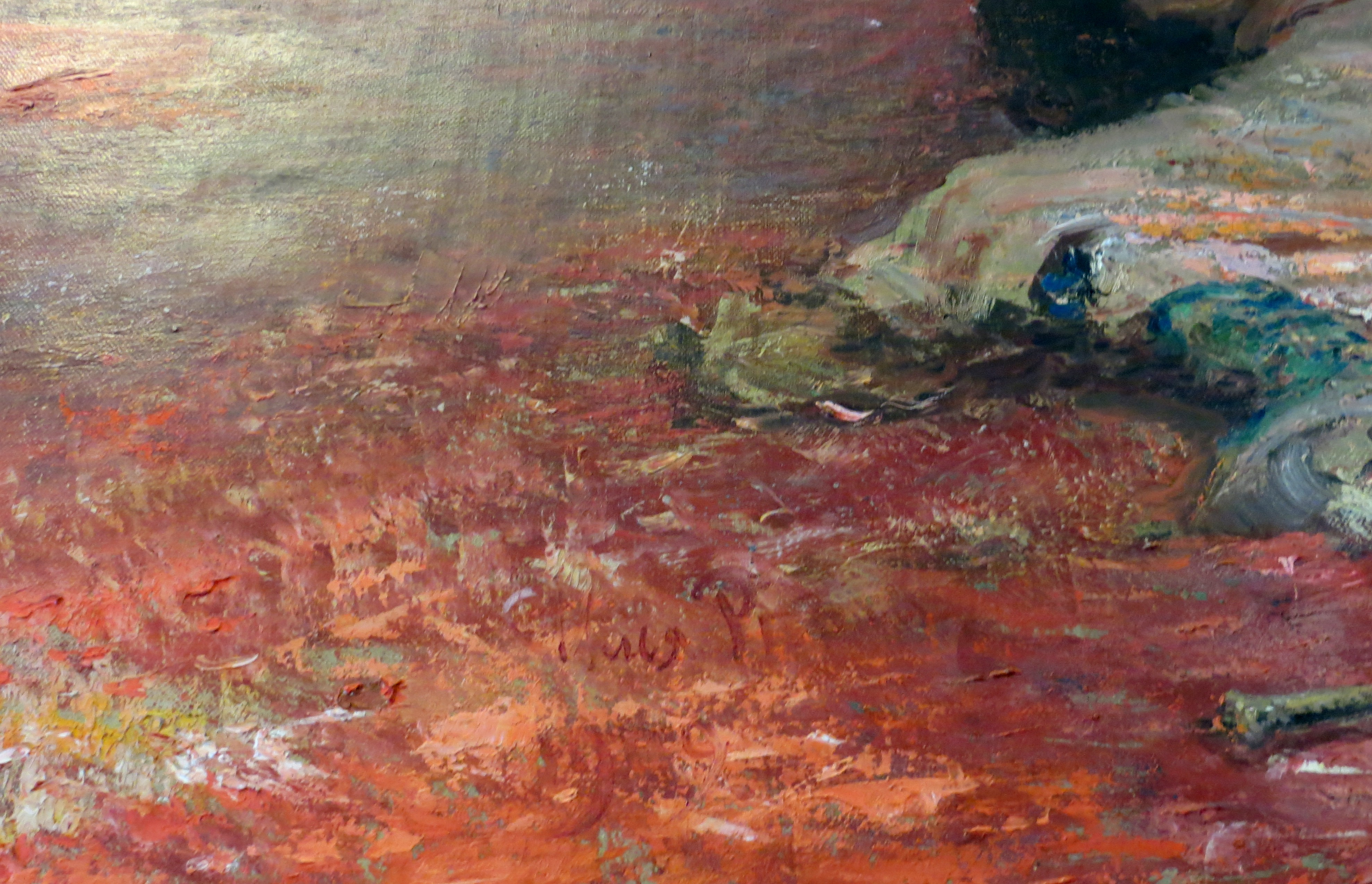
Detail of Filicide.

== Reception and initial censorship ==
In 1885, Ivan the Terrible and His Son Ivan was shown for the first time to Repin's painter friends, among whom were Ivan Kramskoi, Ivan Shishkin, Nikolai Yaroshenko and Pavel Brullov. According to Repin, his hosts were stunned and silent for a long time, waiting to see what Kramskoi would say:

I was seized with a feeling of complete appreciation for Repin. There it is, the thing, what a level of talent ... And how it's painted, my God, how it's painted! ... And what is this murder, carried out by a wild beast and a psychopath? ... A father hits his son with his sceptre in the temple? One moment ... He utters a cry of terror ... He grabs him, he sits him on the ground, he raises him ... He presses one of his hands on the wound in the temple (and blood gushes out of the cracks between the fingers) ... and as he bawls ... It's an animal, howling with fear ... the very spot that the son has marked with his temple ... Really, this scene is drowning us in half-light and a kind of natural tragic.

— Ivan Kramskoi

The very conservative Attorney General of the Most Holy Synod Konstantin Pobedonostsev told Alexander III of his "repulsion" and perplexity about the painting, which did not please the Tsar and his entourage, and on 1 April 1885, viewings of the painting were forbidden. It was the first painting to be censored in the Russian Empire, and Pavel Tretyakov, who bought it, was told "not to expose it, and more generally not to allow it to be brought to the attention of the public by any other means". The ban was lifted on 11 July 1885 after the intervention of the painter Alexey Bogolyubov.

== Vandalism and controversies ==
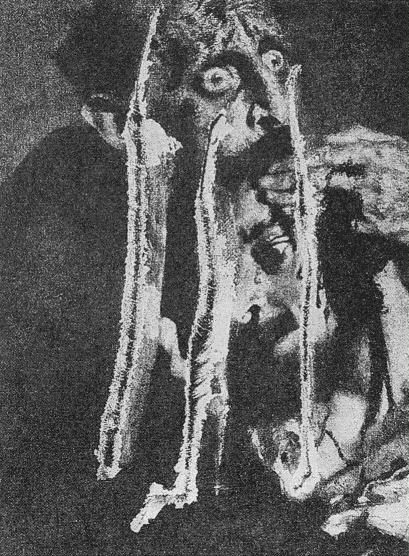
Damage to the painting from the 1913 attack

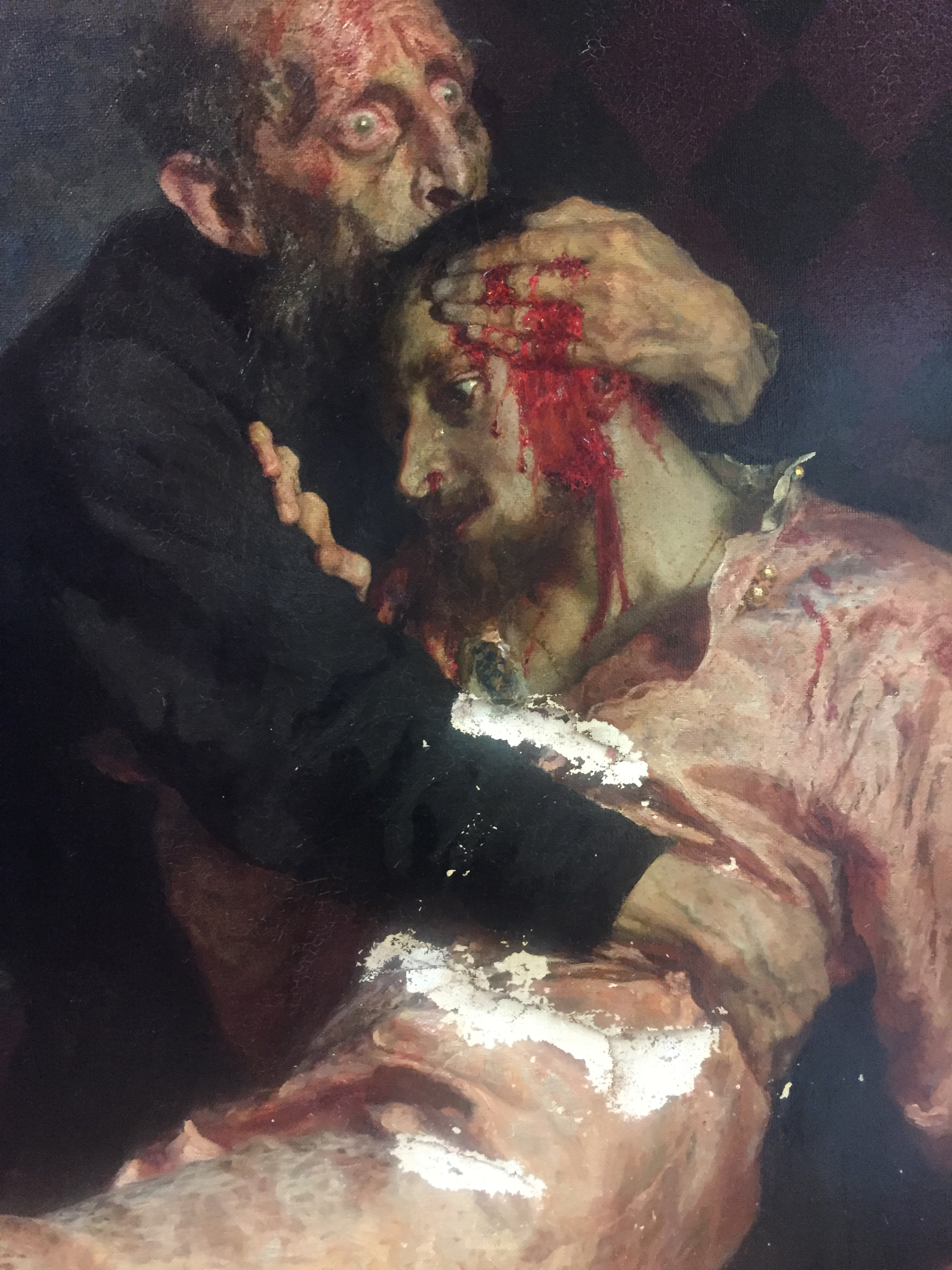
Damage to the painting from the 2018 attack

On 16 January 1913, Ivan the Terrible and His Son Ivan on 16 November 1581 was slashed three times with a knife by Abram Balachov, a 29-year-old iconoclast and Old Believer. The curator of the Tretyakov gallery Georgy Khruslov, learning of the vandalism of the canvas, committed suicide by throwing himself under a train. The painting was restored almost to its original state with the help of Repin; Balachov was admitted to the Moscow Psychiatric Hospital No. 1.

Some Russian nationalists continue to protest the painting's exhibition because they believe it was painted as part of a foreign smear campaign and that the scene depicted is inaccurate.

In October 2013, a group of Orthodox historians and activists, led by Vassili Boiko-Veliki, an apologist and supporter of the canonization of Tsar Ivan, addressed the Minister of Culture of the Russian Federation Vladimir Medinsky to ask him to remove the canvas from the Tretyakov Gallery on the grounds it offends the patriotic feelings of Russians. The director of the Tretyakov Gallery Irina Lebedeva formally opposed the request.

In May 2018, the canvas was again attacked in the Tretyakov Gallery by a drunken visitor who broke its protective glass with a metal bar. The painting suffered serious damage; it was pierced in three places in the central part of the work, which depicts the figure of the tsarevich. The gallery said the frame was also badly damaged but that "by a happy coincidence" the most precious elements of the painting, the depiction of the figures' faces and hands, were not damaged. According to some Russian media, the vandal said he had attacked the painting because he thought the depiction was inaccurate. The attacker was imprisoned for two-and-a-half years. Following extensive restoration works, the painting was placed on display on 16 December 2024.

== Legacy ==
Ivan the Terrible and His Son Ivan remains one of Russia's most famous paintings, and the most psychologically intense of Repin's works. The work appears briefly in the third episode of the 2019 HBO miniseries Chernobyl.

== Subject of the painting and historiography ==
The Tsarevich Ivan's death had grave consequences for Russia, since it left no competent heir to the throne. After the Tsar's death in 1584, his unprepared son Feodor I succeeded him with Boris Godunov as de facto ruler. After Feodor's death, Russia entered a period of political uncertainty, famine and war known as the Time of Troubles.

The details of the Tsarevich's death are unknown and controversial. The Tsarevich died in 1581 in the Alexandrov Kremlin, the residence of Tsar Ivan the Terrible from 1564 to 1581, and the centre of his oprichnina and de facto capital of the Tsardom of Russia.

=== In contemporary Russian chronicles and sources ===
In a letter addressed to Nikita Zakharin and Andrey Shchelkalov in 1581, Ivan the Terrible wrote; "[he] cannot go to Moscow because of [his] son's illness" without identifying the illness. Several contemporary Russian chronicles mention the Tsarevich's death without providing any details. According to the Piskarevsk Chronicle, the death occurred at midnight. None of these chronicles suggest the death of Ivan Ivanovich was violent. Other sources provide a more-detailed version of the death, saying the Tsarevich was mortally wounded by his father during an argument. One of these sources, the Mazurin chronicle, reports the following:

In the summer of 1581, it was from the Sovereign Emperor and Grand Prince Ivan Vassilievitch, that his son, his greatness Prince Tsarevich Ivan Ivanovich, shining with wise meaning and grace and separated from the branch of life by a blade, received evil, and from this evil, he died.

The sources indicate the event took place on 14 November 1581 and that the Tsarevich would have died on 19 November, but the dates reported vary. The diary of the dyak (clerk) Ivan Timofeev says; "some say (of the Tsarevich) that his life was extinguished because of blows by the hands of his father, after trying to prevent him from committing an ugly act".

=== Foreign testimonies ===
Contemporaneous foreign sources are more eloquent; Jacques Margeret, a French mercenary captain in service in Russia, wrote; "there is a rumour that he (the tsar) killed the eldest (son) with his own hand, which wasn't the case, because, although he struck him with the end of the rod and he was wounded by a blow, he did not die from this, but some time later, on a pilgrimage journey".

Another version is reported by the papal diplomat Antonio Possevino. According to him, in November 1581 in the Alexandrov Kremlin, Ivan the Terrible found his daughter-in-law Helen lying on a bench in undergarments. (Note: The female dress of this period usually consisted of two undergarments, the bottom, the shirt, and the top, the dress. The shirt was a garment for domestic use, and it was considered very improper to appear to strangers in it, especially in front of men.)

The third wife of Ivan's son was laying on a bench, dressed in underwear. She was pregnant and didn't expect anyone to visit her. However, the Grand Prince of Moscow (Ivan the Terrible) paid her an unexpected visit. She immediately stood up to meet him, but it was already impossible to calm him down. He hit her in the face, and then beat her with his staff, punching her so hard that she lost her child the next night.

His son Ivan then ran to his father and asked him not to beat his wife, but this only made his father angrier. The Prince started hitting his son with his staff, which resulted in a very serious wound in the head. Before that, in anger at his father, the son hotly reproached him in the following words:

"You imprisoned my first wife in a convent for no reason, you did the same with my second wife, and now you are beating up the third in order to kill the child she carries in her womb." Having injured his son, the father immediately indulged in deep grief and immediately summoned doctors and Andrei Shchelkalov and Nikita Romanovich from Moscow to have everything at hand. On the fifth day, the son died and was transferred to Moscow.

— Antonio Possevino, Historical writings about Russia in the 16th century

=== Stories by Russian historians ===
18th-century Russian historian Nikolay Karamzin also believed the Tsarevich died because of his father but under different circumstances.

He (Ivan the Terrible) put his hand on him (Tsarevich). Boris Godunov wanted to come to his aid but the Tsar inflicted several wounds to him with the point of his sceptre and struck the Tsarevich with it on the head. He then fell to the ground, spilling his blood. The father's fury disappeared. Paling with fear, trembling, in complete shock, he exclaimed "I killed my son" and he threw himself down to kiss him; pouring out the blood flowing from a deep wound, he wept, sobbed, called for the doctors. He implored the mercy of God and the forgiveness of his son.

— Nikolay Karamzin

Repin relied on Karamzin's story to paint Ivan the Terrible and His Son Ivan on 16 November 1581, one of the most-striking paintings of his chrestomathy. Russian imperial historian Mikhail Shcherbatov, who studied the different versions of Ivan Ivanovich's death, considers Possevino's version the most plausible and the Russian imperial historian Vasily Klyuchevsky called it the only reliable version.

== Notes and references ==
=== General and cited references ===
- Yarmolinsky, Avrahm (2016). Road to Revolution: A Century of Russian Radicalism. Princeton University Press. ISBN 978-0-691-63854-6.
- Kel'ner, Viktor Efimovich (2015). 1 marta 1881 goda: Kazn imperatora Aleksandra II (1 марта 1881 года: Казнь императора Александра II). Lenizdat. ISBN 978-5-289-01024-7.
