= Grigoriy Myasoyedov =

Russian artist (1834–1911)

- Григорий Мясоедов
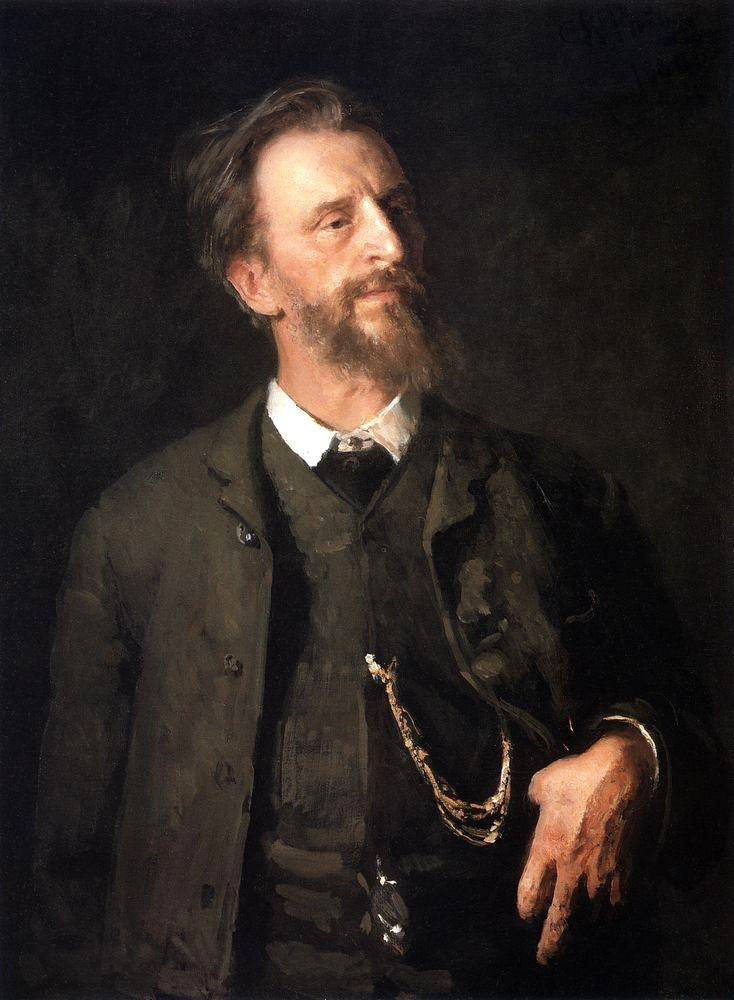
- Portrait by Ilya Repin (1904)
- Born: April 19, 1834; Pankovo, Tula Governorate, Russian Empire
- Died: December 31, 1911 (aged 77); Poltava, Russian Empire
- Resting place: Poltava, Ukraine
- Education: Full Member Academy of Arts (1893)
- Alma mater: Imperial Academy of Arts (1862)
- Known for: Painting
- Style: Realist
- Movement: Peredvizhniki
- Spouses: Ekaterina Krivtsova; Kseniya Ivanova
- Awards: Big Gold Medal of the Imperial Academy of Arts (1862)

Grigoriy Grigorievich Myasoyedov (Russian: Григо́рий Григо́рьевич Мясое́дов; 19 April [O.S. 7 April] 1834 – 31 December [O.S. 18 December] 1911) was a Russian realist painter associated with the Peredvizhniki movement.

== Biography ==
His father was a member of the minor gentry, and was the author of a book titled The Statistical Economic Review of the Southern Part of Tula Guberniya. He began his education at the Gymnasium in Oryol, but didn't complete his studies before enrolling at the Imperial Academy of Arts, where his instructors were Timofey Neff and Alexey Tarasovich Markov. In 1862, he received a gold medal for his painting "The Flight of Grigory Otrepyev from the Inn at the Lithuanian Border" (a scene from Boris Godunov by Pushkin).

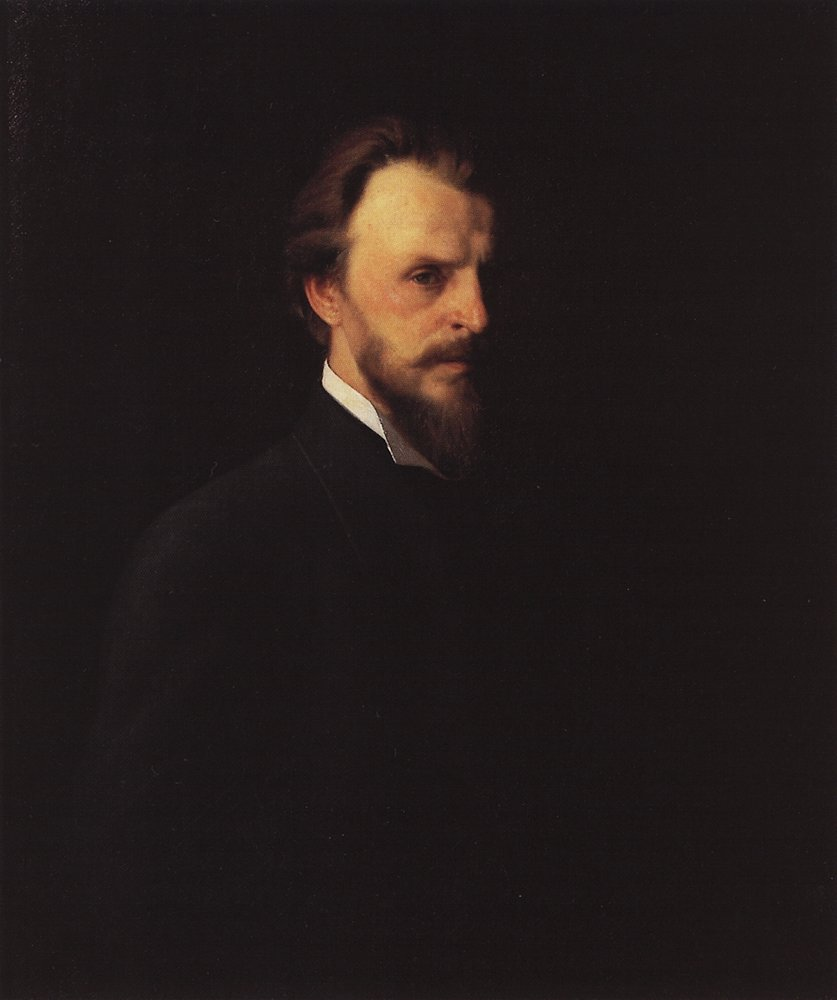
Self-portrait (date unknown)

Having received a stipend for travelling from the Academy, he visited Paris, Florence, Rome and Spain on study trips. Upon returning to Russia in 1870, he was named an Academician. Shortly thereafter, he became one of the founders of the "Association of Travelling Art Exhibitions" (Peredvizhniki), remaining a fervent participant and supporter for the rest of his life. In 1876, he went to live on a farm near Kharkiv and began to create sympathetic portrayals of peasant life.

From 1861 to 1881, he was married to the pianist Ekaterina Krivtsova, but separated from her when she was pregnant with his son Ivan, on the suspicion that Ivan was not his child. He remarried shortly after (to the artist Kseniya Ivanova), but his suspicions lingered and he wouldn't allow Kseniya to treat Ivan as a son. For several years, Ivan was placed in the care of Myasoyedov's friend and colleague, Alexander Kiselyov.

In 1883, Myasoyedov was the model for Ivan the Terrible in Ilya Repin's painting Ivan the Terrible and His Son Ivan.

In 1889, he acquired a large manor house in Poltava, complete with a park, ponds and gardens, where Ivan rejoined the family. While there, he painted a curtain and designed scenery for the local theater. He also organized an art school in 1894 and wrote a book about gardening. He resigned from the Academy in 1902, in protest over their teaching methods.

Although he worked on a variety of subjects, he always had a fondness for religious painting and was planning a triptych of "Holy Russia" when he died.

He was buried on his estate which, since 1926, has been home to the Poltava Gravimetric Observatory.

== Selected paintings ==
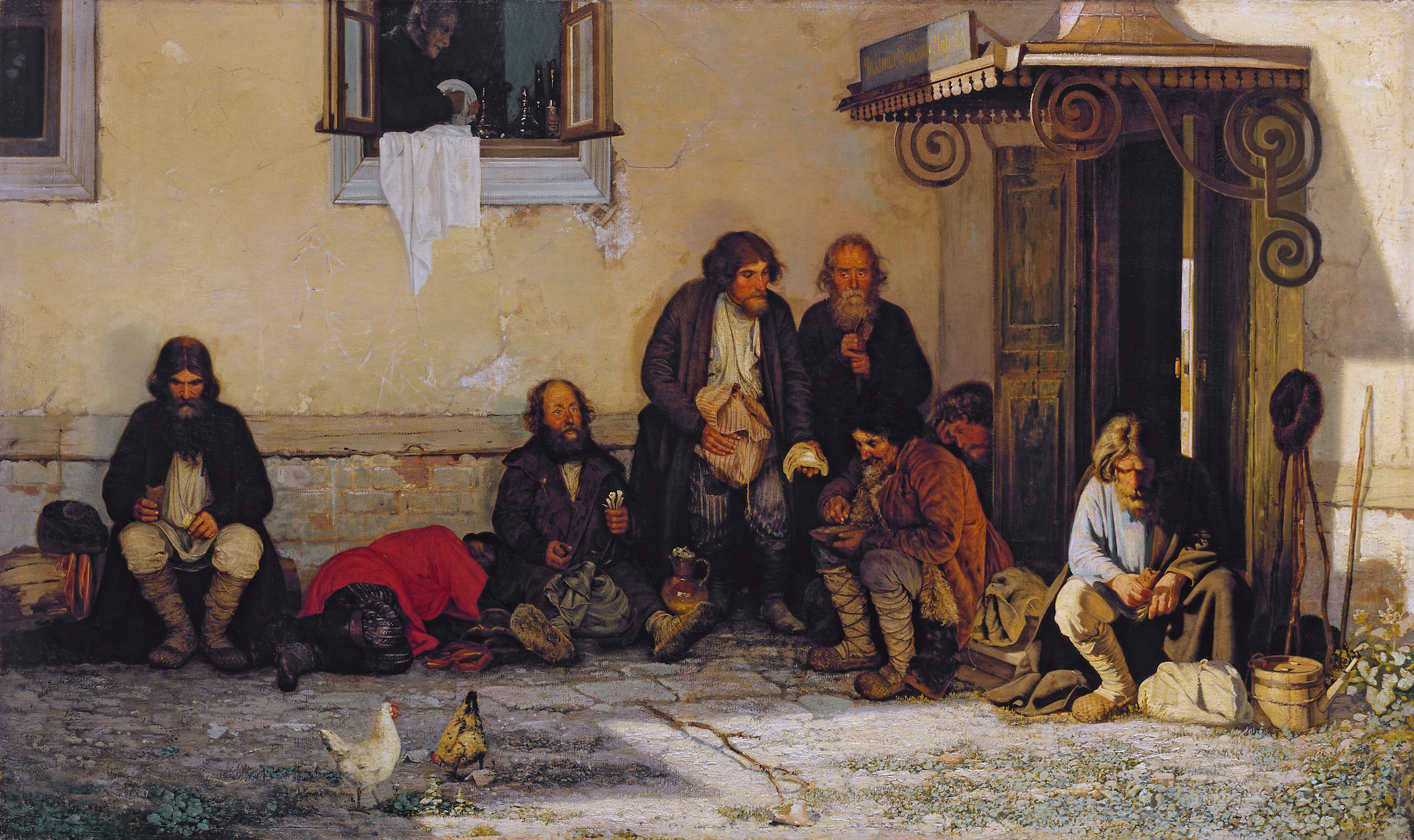
The Zemstvo Dines (1872)

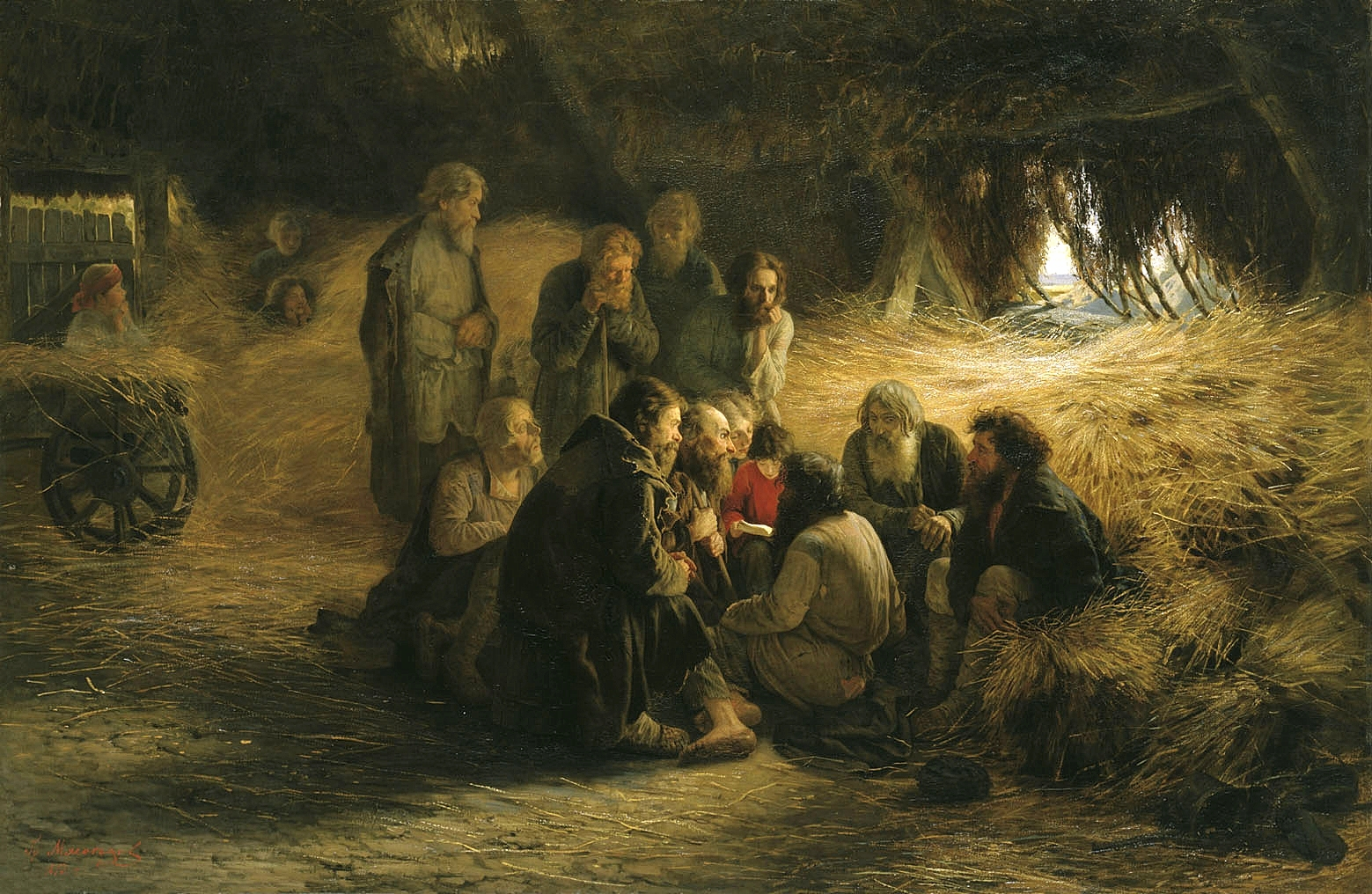
Reading the
Manifesto of 1861 (1881)

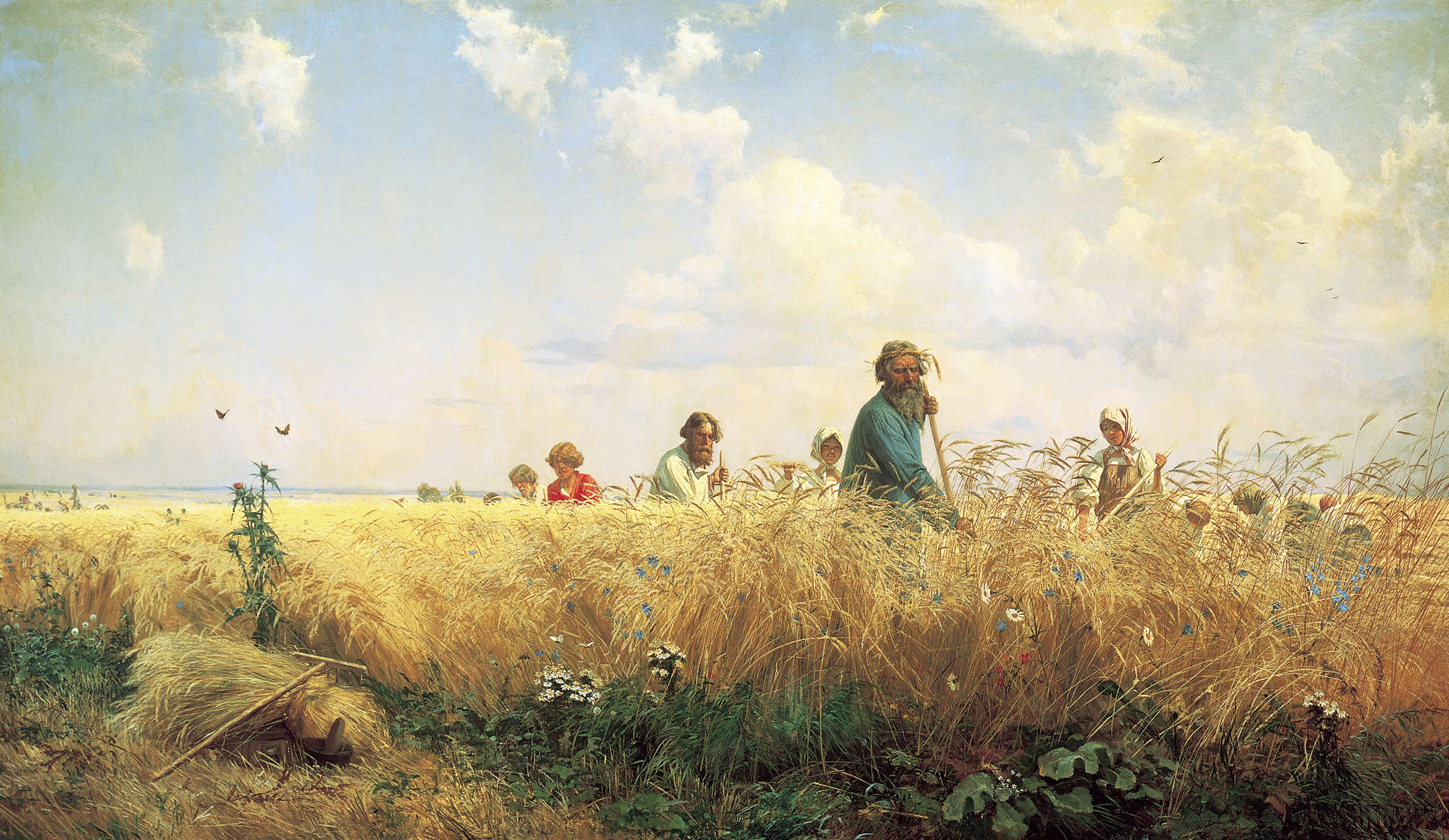
Harvest Time (Mowers) (1887)

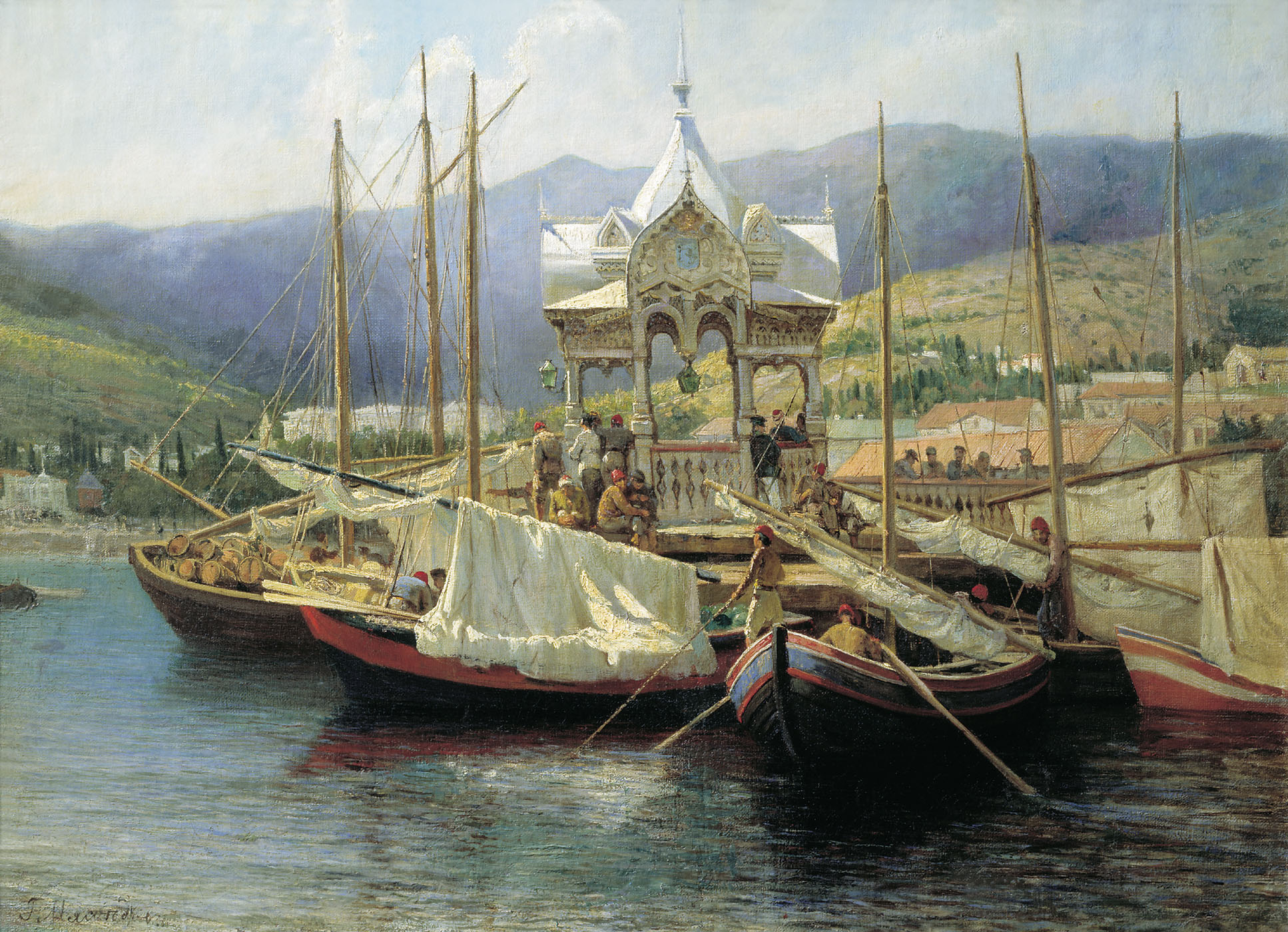
A Wharf in Yalta (1890)

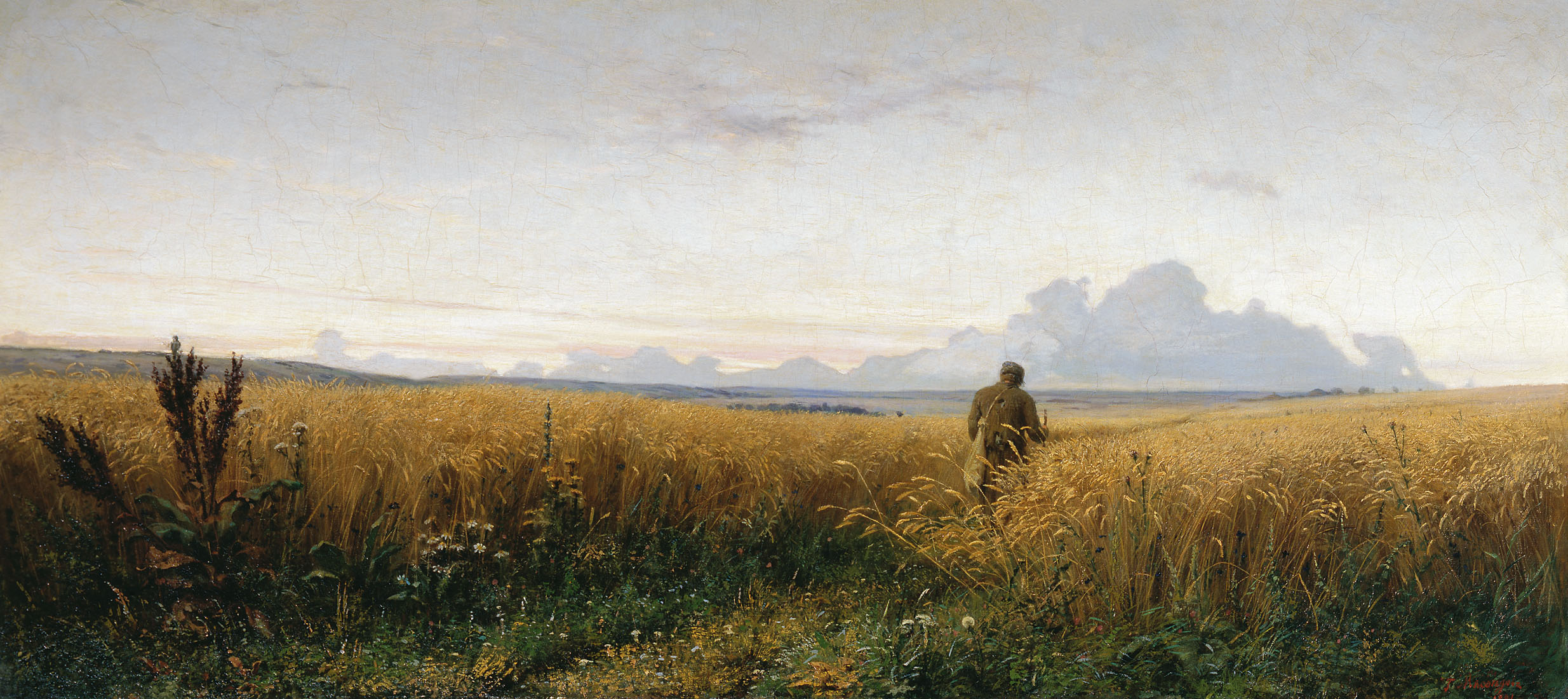
A Road in the Rye (1881)

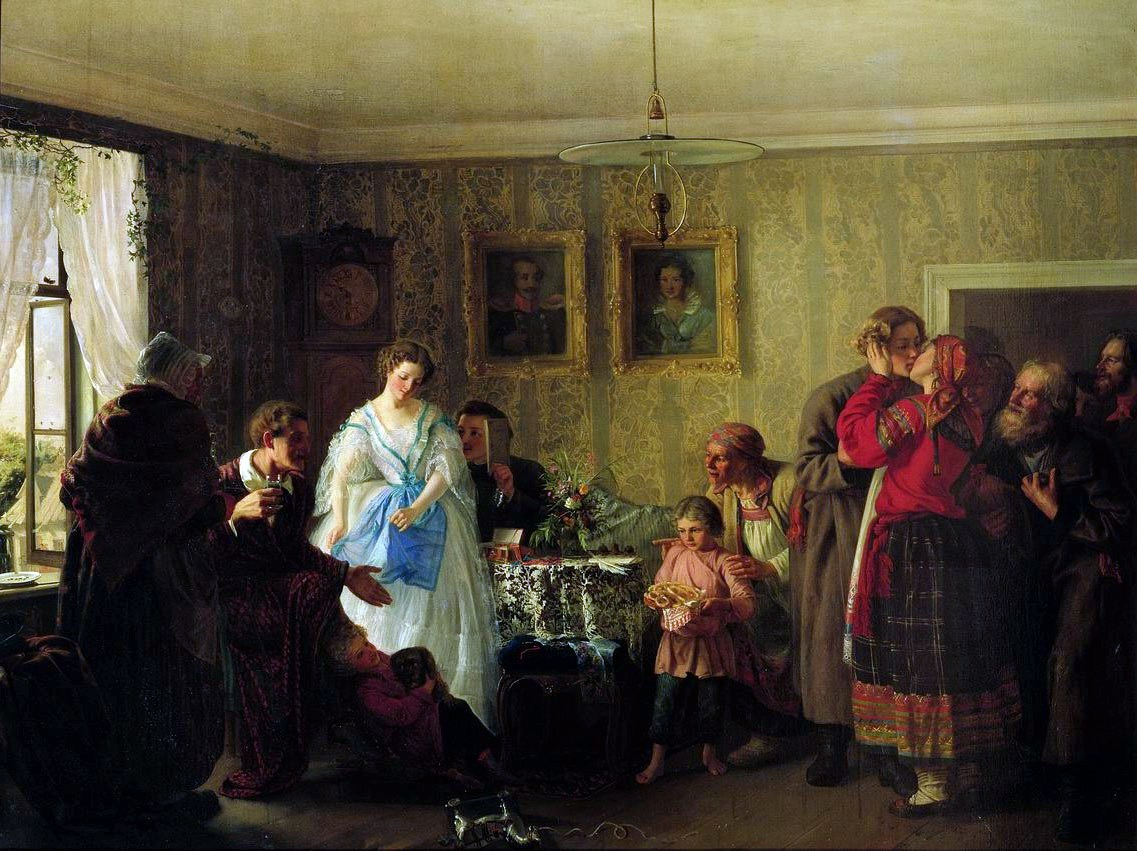
Congratilations of the Newlywed in the House of a Pomeshchik. (1861)
