= They Did Not Expect Him =

Painting by Ilya Repin

- Не ждали (Russian)
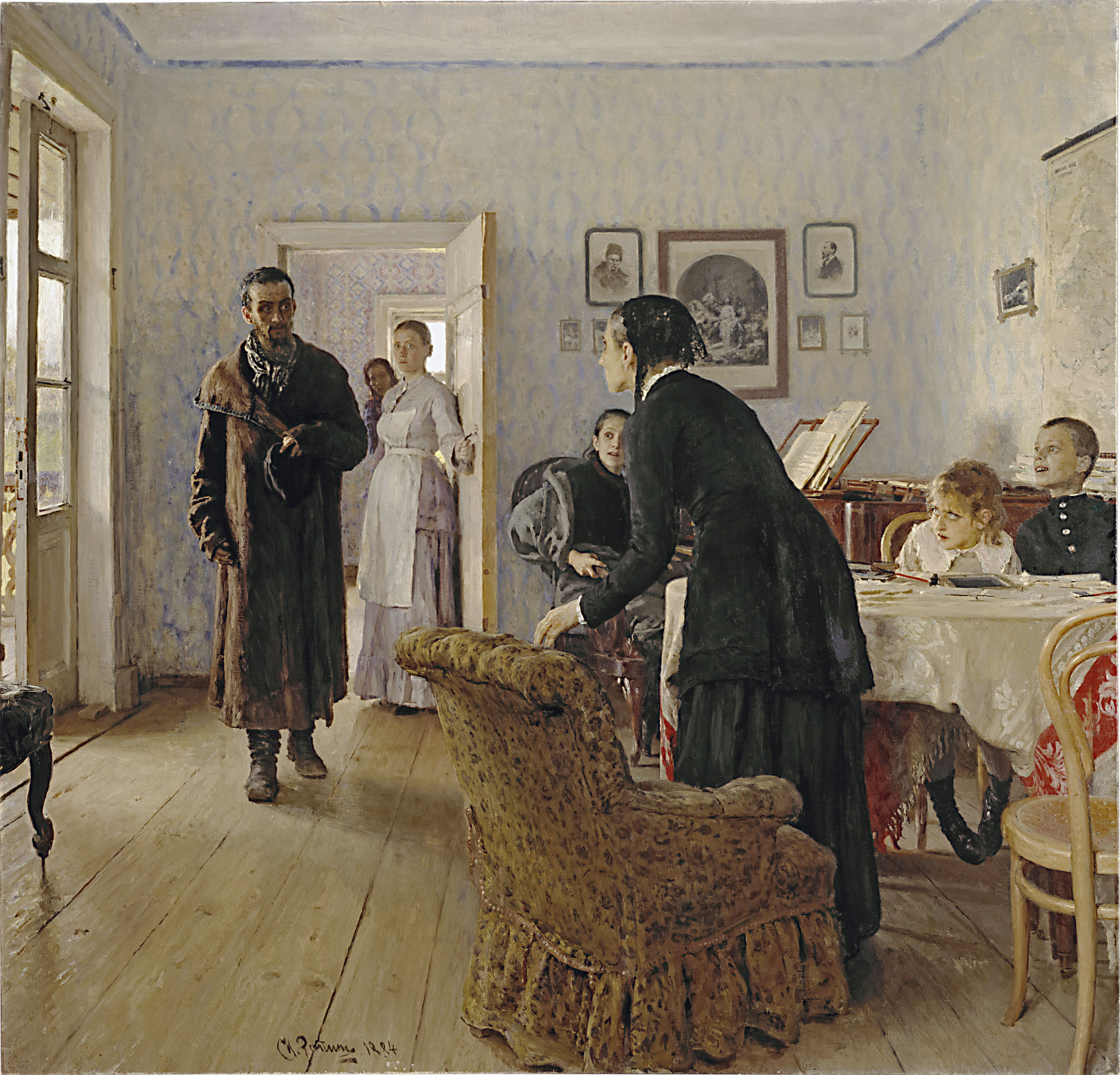
- Artist: Ilya Repin
- Year: 1884–1888
- Medium: Oil on canvas
- Dimensions: 160.5 cm × 167.5 cm (63.2 in × 65.9 in)
- Location: Tretyakov Gallery, Moscow

They Did Not Expect Him (Russian: Не ждали, lit. 'Didn't expect') is a painting by realist artist Ilya Repin made between 1884 and 1888. It depicts the return of a narodnik from exile and his family's reaction. The painting is part of Repin's "Narodniki" series, which includes four other artworks.

Repin began working on early versions of the canvas in 1884, at his country house in Martyshkino. He displayed it the same year in the 12th travelling exhibition of the Peredvizhniki, a group of Russian realist artists who travelled around Russia to host art exhibitions, first in Saint-Petersburg and then in other cities of Russia. It was purchased by Pavel Tretyakov in 1885 for display in his gallery. However, Repin continued to work on the painting after it was purchased, making several changes in 1885, 1887 and 1888, primarily to the face of the man entering the room.

Russian artist and art critic Igor Grabar wrote that the paintings They Did Not Expect Him and Ivan the Terrible and His Son Ivan became the pinnacles of Repin's career, while art historian Dmitry Sarabyanov described the painting as "one of the pinnacles of Russian art in the nineteenth century". Art scholar Aleksei Fedorov-Davydov called They Did Not Expect Him "the most significant and monumental" of the artist's works on revolutionary themes.

== History ==
=== Background ===
Ilya Repin completed his seven years of study at the Imperial Academy of Arts in 1871, and was awarded the Grand Gold Medal of the academy for the painting "The Resurrection of the Daughter of Jairus", as well as the title of class artist of the first degree and the right to a fellowship trip abroad. From 1873 to 1876, the artist lived and worked in France.

Repin returned from Paris to St. Petersburg in July 1876 and later went back to his hometown of Chuguev where he stayed until September 1877. He then returned to Moscow, where he would live and work for the next five years. Repin began working on the theme of procession in 1877. His main work on this theme, "Religious Procession in Kursk Governorate", was begun in 1880 in Moscow, and completed in 1883 in St. Petersburg, where the artist moved in September 1882. Repin wrote to art critic Vladimir Stasov in a letter dated 2 January 1881:

... I will move to St. Petersburg and begin the paintings I have long conceived from the most burning reality that surrounds us, understandable to us and exciting us more than all past events.

In the early 1880s, Repin was greatly influenced by the assassination of Emperor Alexander II by Pervomartovtsy, literally meaning those of March 1, as well as by the public execution of the assassins, which he attended. In the mid-late 1870s, Repin conceived the idea of creating a series of paintings on the theme of Narodism, a political movement of the Russian intelligentsia in the 1870s. The first of the "Narodniki" series is the painting Under Escort. On the Muddy Road (Под конвоем. По грязной дороге; 1876), followed by Arrest of a Propagandist (Арест пропагандиста; 1880–1889), Before Confession (Перед исповедью; 1879–1885) and Meeting (Сходка; 1883).

The 11th travelling exhibition, which featured Repin's Religious Procession in the Kursk Province and several other works, opened in St. Petersburg in March 1883. Ilya Repin and Vladimir Stasov travelled to Europe in the second half of May of that year, visiting Berlin, Dresden, Munich, Paris, Madrid, Venice, and several cities in the Netherlands. In early June, Repin returned to St. Petersburg, and later settled in the dacha village of Martyshkino near Oranienbaum.

=== Creation ===
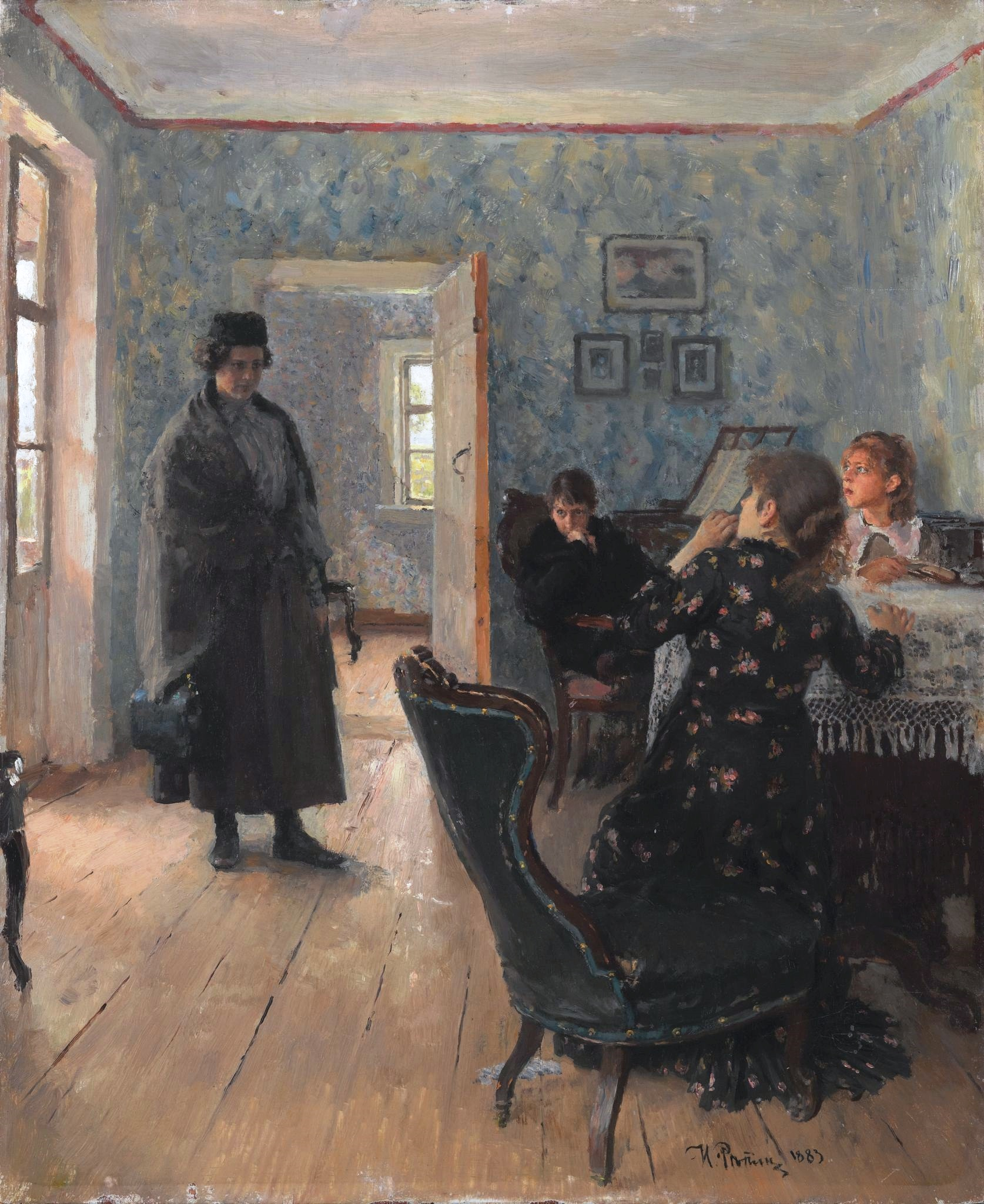
First version of They Did Not Expect (1883)

There are two different versions of They Did Not Expect (Him). Repin began work on the first one in 1883, depicting a student's return to her family. This oil on wood painting has a relatively small format, 45.8 × 37 cm. Fifteen years later, in 1898, Repin reworked this version, making several changes to the figure of the young woman, whose face was reminiscent of his daughter Nadia. It is currently in the Tretyakov Gallery's collection.

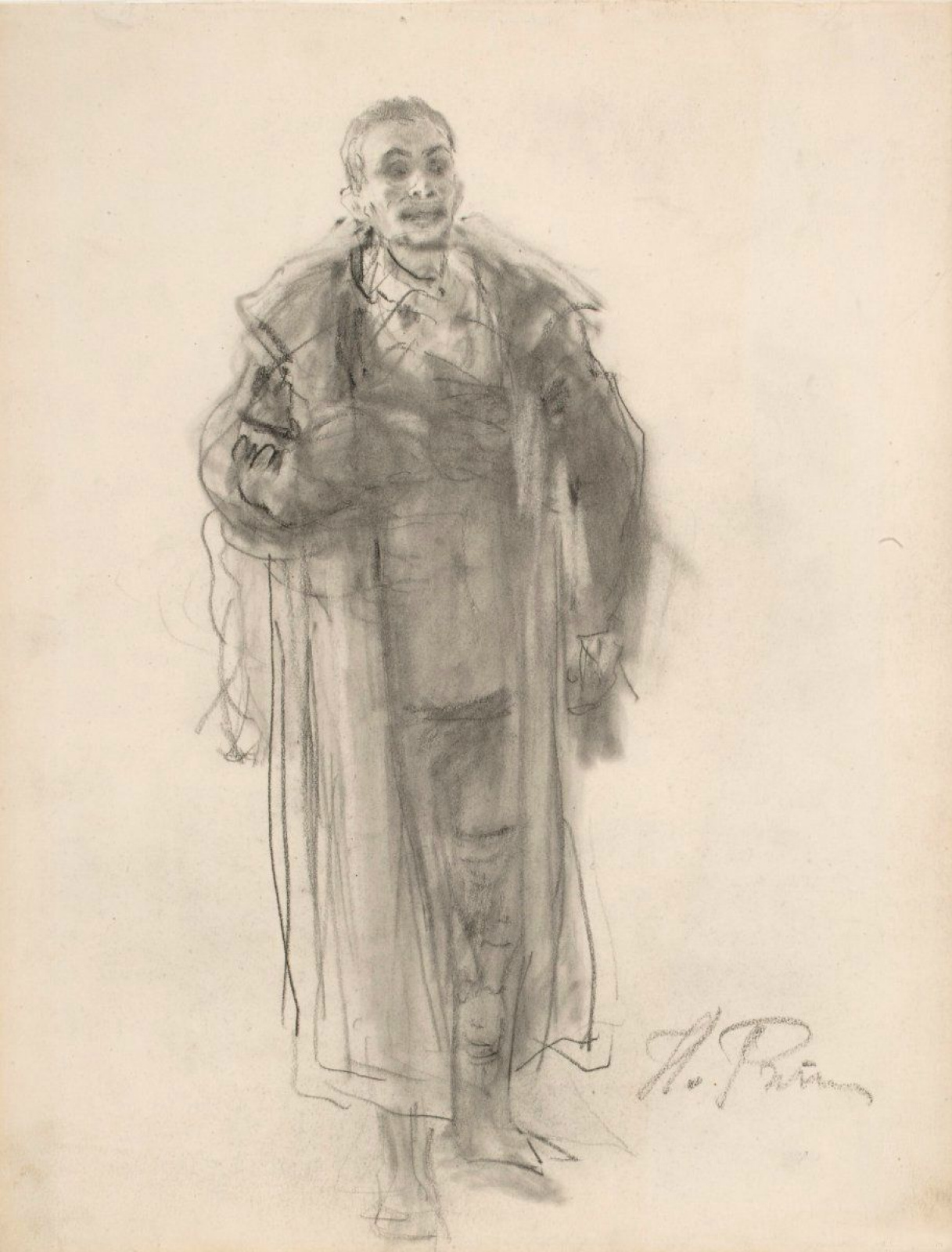
Sketch for They Did Not Expect Him (1884)

In his 1948 article titled "New Pages of Repin's Creative Biography", art historian Ilya Zilberstein discussed the first version of They Did Not Expect Him. According to him, the painting was intended to feature a young girl as the main character. Her revolutionary attire was strikingly similar to that of The Student in Nikolai Yaroshenko's painting, as both heroines wore plaid with a small cap on their heads. According to Ilya Zilberstein, when Repin saw The Student and read the press reviews, he decided to replace the character of the young girl in the second version of his painting with that of a young man.

Repin began painting a second version, which would become the main one, in 1884. It was much larger, and the woman who had entered the room had been replaced by a man. The painter worked on it in his country house in Martyshkino, near Saint Petersburg, and posed for it with members of his family and acquaintances. The model for the exile's mother is thus partly Vera Alexeievna, Repin's wife, and partly Varvara Komarova, Stasov's daughter; that of the child, Sergei Kostytchev, the son of a neighbour, who would later be a renowned biochemist, professor, and academician; that of the young girl, Vera Repina, the painter's eldest daughter; and that of the maid, an employee of the Repins. The man entering the room is thought to be Vsevolod Garshin, whose portrait Repin worked on in 1884. The resemblance to the writer is complete in an intermediate version of the painting.

The father of the exile is also depicted in the early sketches, notifying everyone else of his impending arrival. The critic Vladimir Stasov also mentions the silhouette of "an old man". Repin left only the characters who, in his opinion, were necessary for the psychological development of the theme he had chosen and for the "coherence of the scenic action" in the final version.

=== 12th traveling exhibition and sale of the painting ===
The painting was included in the 12th itinerant exhibition of the Peredvizhniki, which was then in Saint-Petersburg, beginning in 1884. Pavel Tretyakov had decided not to buy the painting after telling Repin that it had many qualities but also flaws; its subject did not interest him, but it seemed to him that it would touch the public. Repin himself was also not entirely satisfied with the painting's visual treatment of the theme of exile's return. They Did Not Expect Him then travelled to various cities throughout Russia with the travelling exhibition. Pavel Tretyakov informed Repin at the end of the trip that he had decided to purchase the canvas. Repin had also received another offer from Fyodor Tereshchenko, but turned it down because he wanted to retouch the male character. When the painting was finished, Pavel Tretyakov was able to acquire it for his collection, raising the purchase price from 5,000 to 7,000 rubles.

Repin returned to the painting in 1885, 1887, and 1888. The changes he made were mostly to the expression on the exiled man's face. Andrey Denyer photographed the canvas before the 1885 modifications, and offered the photograph to art critic Vladimir Stasov in 1884.

== Analysis ==
=== Subject ===
The canvas depicts the moment when a man enters a room. He is an exile, most likely a member of the Narodnaya Volya, a Russian revolutionary political organisation founded in the nineteenth century, who has returned from a remote region of Russia. Those in the room, who appear to be his family, were surprised to see him.

Repin expresses the full range of their emotions, in all of their diversity, and in the moment they are created. There is the hesitant joy of the woman seated at the piano, the exiled man's wife, and that of the boy seated at the table, the young girl who looks to the side, probably unaware of who the man is, the wary astonishment of the maid standing in the entrance, the middle-aged woman in the foreground — his mother, whose bent figure expresses profound upheaval.

=== Composition ===
The man's emotion is also palpable. Repin painted and changed his facial expression and head inclination at least three times. Repin had to choose a head inclination position between the elevation of the hero and the lassitude of the martyr, and he eventually retained a questioning and uncertain expression, where there is also heroism and suffering.

The pictorial composition revolves around the exile and his mother, as well as their exchange of gazes. The mother is the link that connects her son, who is still a stranger in this luminous interior, to the rest of the family. The movement she makes towards him is highlighted in the painting by the chair she pushes aside. The painting's centre is occupied by her hand and that of her daughter-in-law, who is seated at the piano.

The secondary characters, such as the child seated at the table in the right part of the painting, give the painting life, consistency, and a lyrical warmth. Other details contribute to this, such as the little girl's posture with her unusually curved legs, and the sensitively painted furnishings of an apartment typical of a family of the intelligentsia at the time.

Details of characters

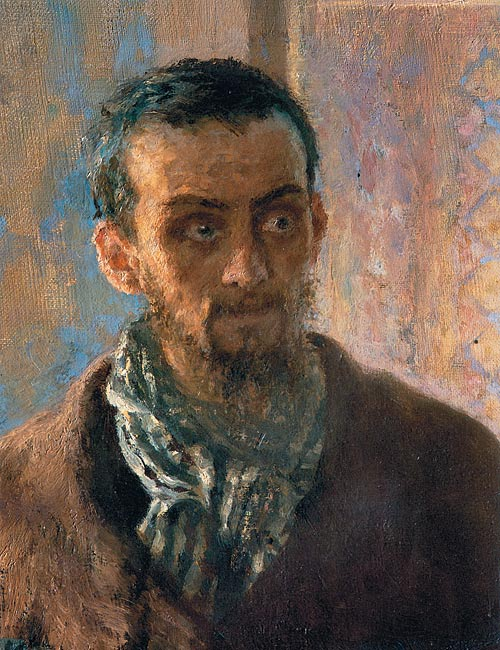
Returned exile

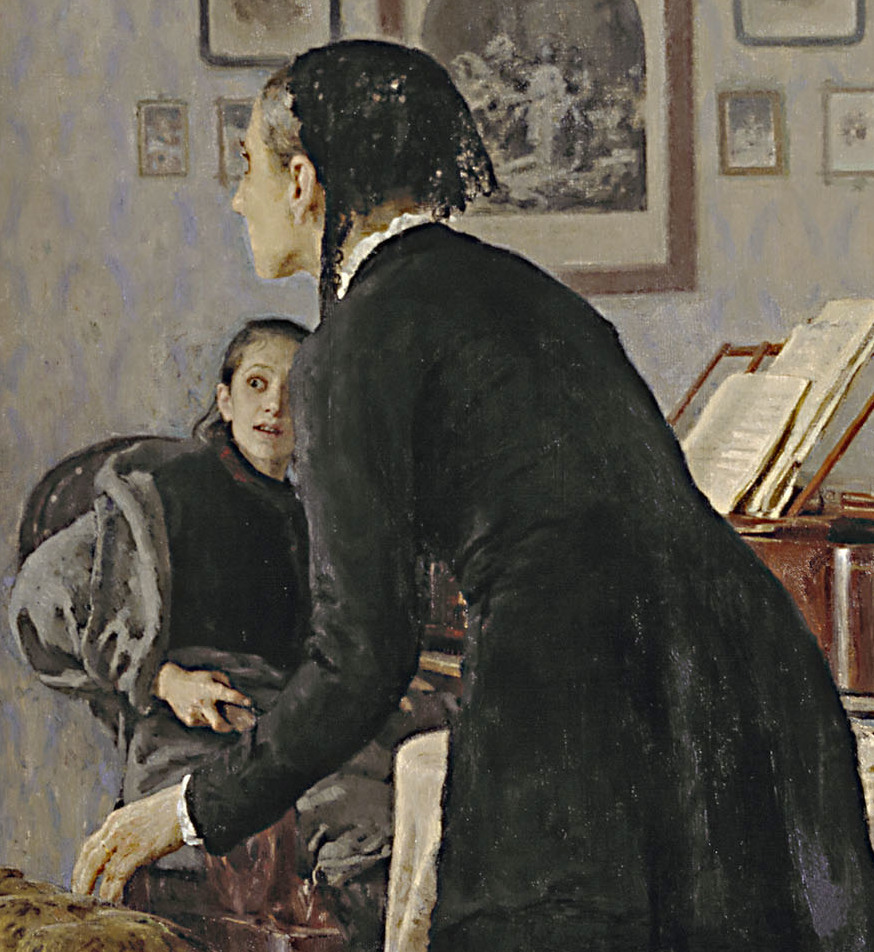
Mother and wife of the exile

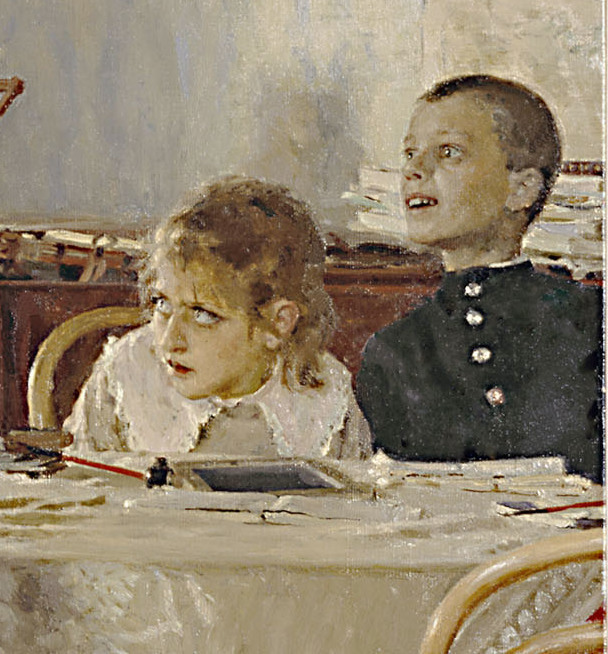
Boy and girl

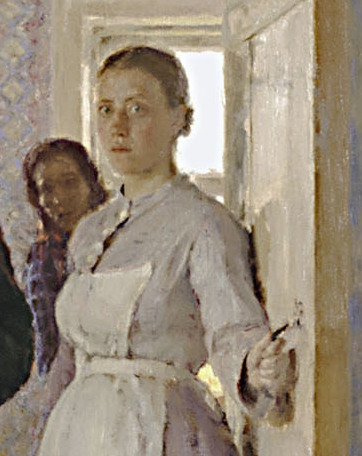
Maid and cook

=== Symbolism ===
Repin emphasises the political and spiritual dimensions of a return following a conviction for revolutionary activity. This return would have been considered "an unexpected and miraculous event" and even a "resurrection" during this period of history, when long sentences were common. The mother rising from her armchair to meet her son is reminiscent of how scenes from the Gospels, such as the resurrection of Lazarus or the Last Supper at Emmaus, are depicted. It is also similar to Alexander Ivanov's painting The Appearance of Christ Before the People, and it establishes a link with the theme of guilt, the prodigal son's return.

The apartment's wall is covered with reproductions that support the painting's political and moral symbolism. These are portraits of democratic writers Nikolay Nekrasov and Taras Shevchenko, a Christ on Golgotha, a symbol of suffering and atonement, and a revolutionary intellectual. There is also a depiction of Emperor Alexander II on his deathbed, having been murdered by the Narodniki.

The painting is full of surprises stylistically: the side lighting, the perspective, the door frame and the window in a row, the set of frames recall Dutch painters. The colours are very well mixed, "the blues are mixed with green, the browns with greys and purples, the reds are purplish".

== Reception ==
They Did Not Expect Him was praised by critic as a "masterpiece of the Russian art school". He stated:

They Did Not Expect Him by Repin exhibition's most talented and remarkable work. It contains a great deal of depth and the expression of a brilliant thought. It reflects our time without blushing or hypocrisy, and the public appreciated and loved it for that.

The painting received a mixed reaction from painter and critic Alexandre Benois. He considers the artificial staging, grimacing characters, and a primary narration to be the painting's weaknesses in his book "History of Russian Painting in the Nineteenth Century": "the gaze passes from a bombastic melodrama to rather superficial characters, but stops with pleasure on an interior treated to perfection, of a grey full of force, and of a lively and simple painting."

The painting was dubbed "the most significant and monumental" of the artist's works on revolutionary themes by art critic Aleksei Fedorov-Davydov. In his book on Repin, he writes:

They Did Not Expect Him is an outstanding canvas by Repin for its beauty and mastery of pictorial choices. It is painted in full light on the motif, and its luminous colorism communicates a soft and clear lyricism that softens the drama it represents... The painter advances genre and historical painting by locating and depicting contemporary heroes. Or, more precisely, he causes them to reach a specific force, paving the way for a painting of contemporary history.

Alain Besançon, a French historian, regards the painting exemplary for the connection it creates between painting and literature:

Repin's skill is bringing together, on the stage suggested by classical perspective, the elements of a drama that are advanced sequentially on a real theatrical stage or in a novel and which are presented simultaneously here. The eye can browse these messages, which are conveyed in traditional painting through the militant's peasant clothing, the tottering pose of the old lady, the expressions on the faces, and the mute participation of Nekrassov and Shevchenko.

The artist and art critic Igor Grabar wrote that the paintings They Did Not Expect Him and Ivan the Terrible and His Son Ivan became "the highest points in Repin's career both in terms of the power of expression and pictorial power". According to him, no other Repin painting could ever top these two. Similarly, art critic Dmitry Sarabyanov regarded They Did Not Expect Him as "one of the pinnacles of Russian painting of the 19th century".

== Legacy ==
The painting was featured on a Soviet postage stamp released in 1969.

They Did Not Expect Him was displayed at the Repin exhibition at Paris's Petit Palais from 5 October 2021 to 23 January 2022.

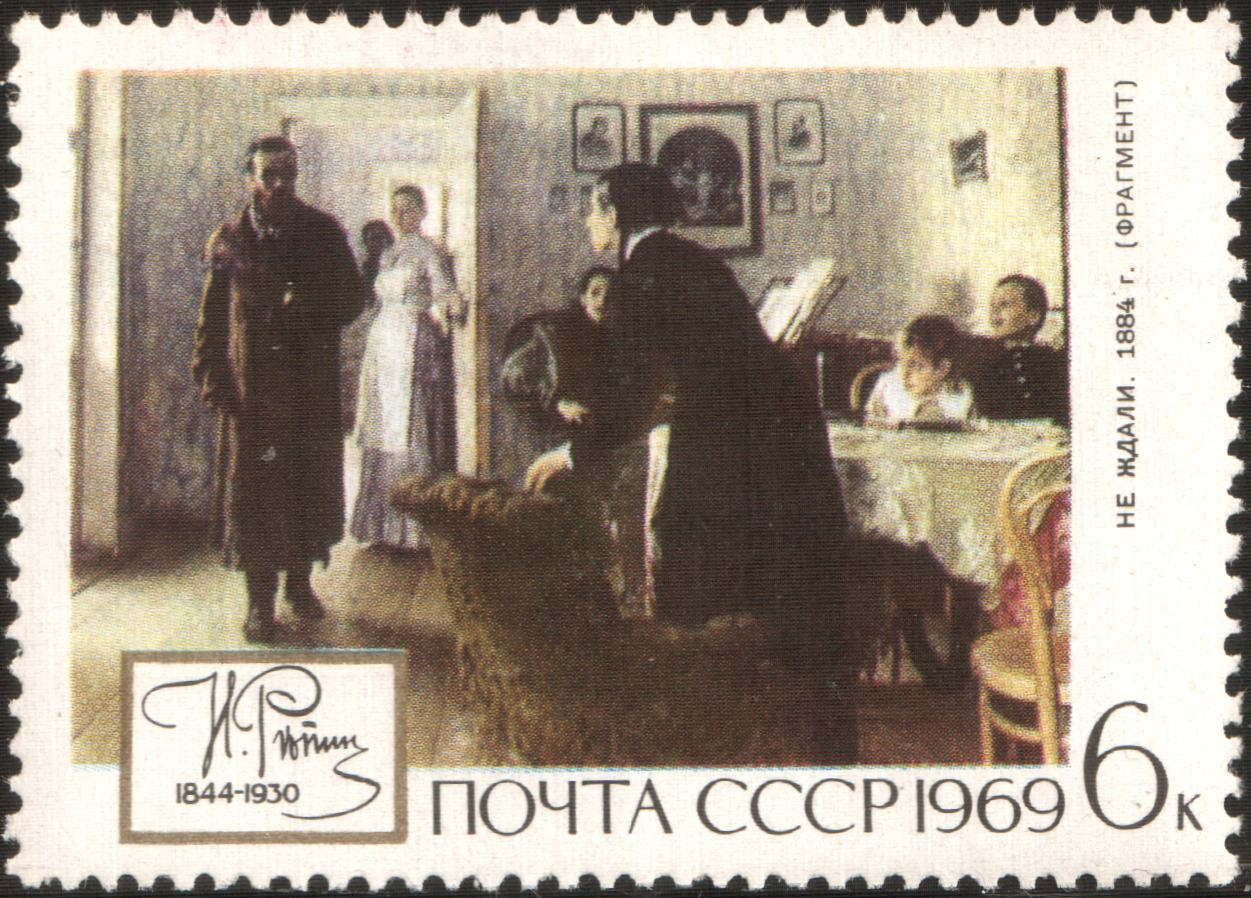
Soviet post stamp (1969)
