= Valkenier =

Valkenier or Valkeniers is a surname. Notable people by that name include:

- Elizabeth Kridl Valkenier (1926–2024) is a Polish-American art historian.
- Bruno Valkeniers (born 1955) is a Flemish businessman.
- Jef Valkeniers (born 1932) is a physician-neuropsychiatrist and a Flemish politician.
