= Elizabeth Kridl Valkenier =

Polish-American art historian (1926–2024)

- Born: 13 November 1926; Warsaw, Poland
- Died: November 13, 2024 (aged 98)
- Spouse: Robert Willem Valkenier (m. 1951; died 2003)
- Children: 1

Academic background
- Education: Smith College; Yale University; Columbia University

Academic work
- Discipline: History
- Sub-discipline: 19th century Russian art

Elizabeth Kridl Valkenier (November 13, 1926 – November 13, 2024) was a Polish-born American art historian and a specialist in nineteenth century Russian art. Her work on the Peredvizhniki, first published in 1977, was part of a re-evaluation of their aims in breaking away from the Russian academy.

== Early life ==
Elizabeth Kridl was born in Warsaw, Poland, on November 13, 1926, the daughter of Manfred Edward and Halina (Meylert) Kridl. She arrived in the United States in 1941. She received her BA from Smith College in 1948, her MA from Yale University in 1949, and her PhD from Columbia University in 1973.

== Career ==
Valkenier was a research associate at the Council on Foreign Relations, New York City, 1953–1962, and a professor of Russian history at Hunter College, City University of New York, 1973–1974. She was a research assistant at the European Institute, Columbia University, 1962–1972, and an assistant curator for Russian archives, 1975–1978. She was a resident scholar at the Harriman Institute from 1981 and professor of political science 1982–2000. From 2004 she was professor of Russian art history. As of 2017, she remained an adjunct associate professor of art history and archaeology in the Harriman Institute of Columbia University.

In 1977, Valkenier published Russian Realist Art. The State and Society: The Peredvizhniki and Their Tradition in which she re-evaluated the art of the Peredvizhniki, a group of Russian realist artists who broke away from the Imperial Academy of Arts. In the foreword to the 1989 Columbia University Press reprint of the book, she commented that in writing it she had expected to find that the Peredvizhniki were all devoted followers of Nikolay Chernyshevsky and the other revolutionary democrats as stated in Soviet textbooks from 1932. An examination of the primary sources, however, revealed that their motives were more complex. In her foreword to the reprint (written in September 1988) she noted that the courtesy copies of her 1977 book that she had sent to Soviet museums and libraries at the time had not been available to the general reader there but she hoped that in the period of glasnost that the reprinting of her book would be propitious and be part of the general reassessment and rectification of history in the USSR. In the book she explains how their motives were more liberal than revolutionary and related as much to their wish for personal autonomy as to their wish for political reform.

A festschrift was issued in Valkenier's honour in 2014.

== Personal life and death ==
Kridl married Robert Willem Valkenier on 7 December 1951, and he died in 2003. They had one child, a daughter. Kridl Valkenier died on 13 November 2024, her 98th birthday.

== Selected publications ==
- Russian Realist Art. The State and Society: The Peredvizhniki and Their Tradition. Ardis, Ann Arbor, 1977. (Reprinted by Columbia University Press in 1989 with a new foreword by the author) ISBN 0882332643
- The Soviet Union and the Third World: An Economic Bind. Greenwood Press, 1983. (Studies of the Harriman Institute) ISBN 978-0275910976
- Pressures in Polish-Soviet Relations. National Council for Soviet and East European Research, Washington, 1989.
- Ilya Repin and the World of Russian Realist Art. Columbia University Press, New York, 1990. (Studies of the Harriman Institute, Columbia University)
- The Wanderers: Masters of Nineteenth-Century Russian Painting. University of Washington Press, 1991. ISBN 978-0936227085
- Valentin Serov: Portraits of Russia's Silver Age. Northwestern University Press, 2001. (Studies in Russian Literature and Theory) ISBN 978-0810118263
