= 1889 in literature =

This article contains information about the literary events and publications of 1889.

== Events ==
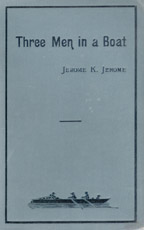
1st ed.

- January – H. G. Wells begins to teach science at Henley House School, north London, where his pupils include A. A. Milne, whose father John Vine Milne runs the school.
- February 12 – Henrik Ibsen's symbolic drama The Lady from the Sea (1888) receives simultaneous first performances in Oslo (in Norwegian) and Weimar (in German).
- March 14 – August Strindberg's naturalistic drama Miss Julie (Fröken Julie), 1888, is first performed, by the Scandinavian Experimental Theater at the University of Copenhagen. His wife Siri von Essen plays the title rôle.
- April 24 – The Garrick Theatre in London, financed by playwright W. S. Gilbert, opens with a performance of Pinero's The Profligate.
- May 30 – The English publisher Henry Vizetelly is prosecuted for obscenity for the second time in London; he is again fined and imprisoned for his English translations of Émile Zola's works.
- June – Algernon Methuen begins publishing books in England, which is the origin of Methuen Publishing.
- August 30 – Arthur Conan Doyle and Oscar Wilde are entertained together at dinner at the Langham Hotel, London, by the American Joseph Marshall Stoddart of Lippincott's Monthly Magazine, who commissions from them respectively the stories The Sign of the Four and The Picture of Dorian Gray, which appear next year in the magazine.
- September 3 – Jerome K. Jerome's comic fictional English travelogue set on the River Thames, Three Men in a Boat (To Say Nothing of the Dog), is published in Bristol.
- November – Leo Tolstoy's novella The Kreutzer Sonata circulates in clandestine copies. In December the Russian authorities confirm that commercial publication will not be permitted.
- September 14 – The Volkstheater, Vienna opens with a performance of Der Fleck auf der Ehr (The Stain on Honour) by its Dramaturg, Ludwig Anzengruber, who dies on December 10 from blood poisoning.
- November – Marcel Proust begins a year's service in the French army, stationed at Coligny Barracks in Orléans.
- December 12 – Robert Browning's book Asolando; Fancies and facts is published on the same day he dies at Ca' Rezzonico in Venice. He is buried in Poets' Corner in Westminster Abbey.
- unknown dates
  - The first literary novel in the Maltese language, Anton Manwel Caruana's Ineż Farruġ, is published.
  - The first of four volumes of Theodore Roosevelt's The Winning of the West is published in the United States.

== New books ==
=== Fiction ===
- Gabriele D'Annunzio – Il piacere (The Pleasure)
- Herman Bang – Tine (Tina)
- Paul Bourget – The Disciple (Le Disciple)
- Anton Chekhov
  - "The Bet" («Пари», Pari, short story)
  - A Dreary Story («Скучная история», Skuchnaya istoriya, novella)
  - "A Nervous Breakdown" («Припадок», Pripadok, short story)
- Wilkie Collins (died September 23)
  - Blind Love (unfinished)
  - The Legacy of Cain
- Elizabeth Burgoyne Corbett – New Amazonia
- Marie Corelli – Ardath
- Arthur Conan Doyle
  - Micah Clarke
  - The Mystery of Cloomber
- George Gissing – The Nether World
- H. Rider Haggard – Cleopatra
- Margaret Harkness (as John Law) – In Darkest London
- William Dean Howells – A Hazard of New Fortunes
- Jerome K. Jerome – Three Men in a Boat
- George A. Moore – Mike Fletcher
- William Morris – The Roots of the Mountains: Wherein is Told Somewhat of the Lives of the Men of Burgdale, Their Friends, Their Neighbors, Their Foemen, and Their Fellows in Arms
- Armando Palacio Valdés – Sister San Sulpicio (La hermana San Sulpicio)
- Bolesław Prus – The Doll (Lalka; serialization concludes)
- Molly Elliot Seawell – Hale-Weston
- Robert Louis Stevenson – The Master of Ballantrae
- Robert Louis Stevenson and Lloyd Osbourne – The Wrong Box
- Hermann Sudermann – The Cats' Bridge (Der Katzensteg)
- Leo Tolstoy – The Kreutzer Sonata («Крейцерова соната», Kreitzerova Sonata)
- Mark Twain – A Connecticut Yankee in King Arthur's Court
- Giovanni Verga – Mastro-don Gesualdo
- Julius Vogel – Anno Domini 2000, or, Woman's Destiny
- Bertha von Suttner – Die Waffen nieder! (Lay Down Your Arms!)
- Oscar Wilde – "The Portrait of Mr. W. H." (short story in Blackwood's Magazine, July)

=== Children and young people ===
- Lewis Carroll – Sylvie and Bruno
- Andrew Lang – The Blue Fairy Book
- Jules Verne – The Purchase of the North Pole (Sans dessus dessous)

=== Drama ===
- Anton Chekhov – 1-act plays
  - A Marriage Proposal («Предложение», Predlozheniye)
  - The Wedding («Свадьба», Svadba)
- Rasmus Effersøe – Gunnar Havreki
- Lizzie May Elwyn - Sweetbrier; or the Flower Girl of New York
- Sydney Grundy – A Pair of Spectacles (adapted from Labiche and Delacour's Les Petits Oiseaux)
- Gerhart Hauptmann – Before Sunrise (Vor Sonnenaufgang)
- 'Bjarne P. Holmsen' (Arno Holz and Johannes Schlaf) – Papa Hamlet
- Maurice Maeterlinck – Princess Maleine (La Princesse Maleine)
- Helena Patursson – Veðurføst (Lenten Weather)
- Hermann Sudermann – Honour (Die Ehre)
- Leo Tolstoy – The Fruits of Enlightenment («Плоды просвещения», Plody prosveshcheniya)
- A. C. Torr (Fred Leslie) and Herbert F. Clark – Ruy Blas and the Blasé Roué (burlesque)

=== Poetry ===
- Herman Gorter – Mei (May)
- Verner von Heidenstam – Vallfart och vandringsår (Pilgrimage: the Wandering Years)
- William Butler Yeats – The Wanderings of Oisin and Other Poems (including "Down by the Salley Gardens")

=== Non-fiction ===
- Henri Bergson – Time and Free Will: An Essay on the Immediate Data of Consciousness (Essai sur les données immédiates de la conscience)
- Helena Petrovna Blavatsky – The Voice of the Silence
- Eugen von Böhm-Bawerk – Positive Theory of Capital
- Charles Booth – Life and Labour of the People in London (begins publication)
- Edward Carpenter – Civilization: its Cause and Cure
- William Temple Hornaday – The Extermination of the American Bison
- T. H. Huxley – Agnosticism
- Samuel Liddell MacGregor Mathers – The Key of Solomon the King (Clavicula Solomonis)
- Friedrich Nietzsche – Götzen-Dämmerung, oder, Wie man mit dem Hammer philosophiert (Twilight of the Idols, or, How to Philosophize with a Hammer)
- Papus – Le Tarot des Bohémiens
- William Mackintire Salter – Ethical Religion
- Oscar Wilde – "The Decay of Lying" (essay in The Nineteenth Century, January)
- Encyclopædia Britannica, 9th edition (completed in 24 main volumes)

== Births ==
- February 8 – Siegfried Kracauer, German-American writer, journalist, sociologist, cultural critic, and film theorist (died 1966)
- March 1 – Kanoko Okamoto (岡本かの子, Ohnuki Kano), Japanese novelist and poet (died 1939)
- April 7 – Gabriela Mistral, Chilean poet, Nobel Prize laureate (died 1957)
- April 18 – Horace Alexander, English current-affairs writer and ornithologist (died 1989)
- May 12 – Ouyang Yuqian (欧阳予倩), Chinese dramatist (died 1962)
- June 23 – Anna Akhmatova, Russian poet (died 1966)
- July 5 – Jean Cocteau, French writer (died 1963)
- July 17 – Erle Stanley Gardner, American author (died 1970)
- July 22 - James Whale, English film director (died 1957)
- August 5 – Conrad Aiken, American novelist and poet (died 1973)
- August 12 – Zerna Sharp, American writer and educator (Dick and Jane) (died 1981)
- August 22 – Peter Frederick Anson, English writer on religion and maritime matters (died 1975)
- September 1 – Leonora Eyles, English feminist writer and novelist (died 1960)
- September 15 – Claude McKay, Jamaican American writer (died 1948)
- September 23 – Walter Lippmann, American writer (died 1974)
- September 25
  - G. D. H. Cole, English political theorist, economist and historian (died 1959)
  - C. K. Scott-Moncrieff, Scottish writer and translator (died 1930)
- September 26 – Martin Heidegger, German philosopher (died 1976)
- October 18 – Fannie Hurst, American novelist (died 1968)
- October 27 – Enid Bagnold, English writer and playwright (died 1981)
- November 12 – DeWitt Wallace, American magazine publisher (Reader's Digest) (died 1981)
- November 14 – Taha Hussein, Egyptian writer and intellectual (died 1973)
- December 7 – Gabriel Marcel, French philosopher, critic and playwright (died 1973)

== Deaths ==
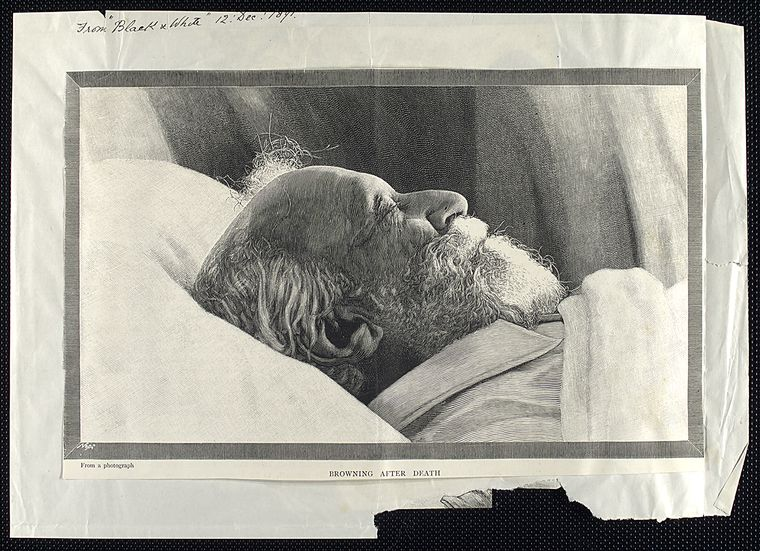
Browning after death.

- January 3 – James Halliwell-Phillipps, English bibliophile (born 1820)
- January 17 – Juan Montalvo, Ecuadorian writer (born 1832)
- March 26 – Elizabeth Ayton Godwin, English hymn writer and religious poet (born 1817)
- April 23 – Jules Amédée Barbey d'Aurevilly, French novelist (born 1808)
- May 28 – Madeleine Vinton Dahlgren, American writer, translator (born 1825)
- June 8 – Gerard Manley Hopkins, English poet (born 1844)
- June 15 – Mihai Eminescu, Romanian poet (born 1850)
- August 5 – Fanny Lewald, German novelist (born 1811)
- August 19 – Auguste Villiers de l'Isle-Adam, French Symbolist writer (born 1838)
- September 4 – Warren Felt Evans, American author of the New Thought movement (born 1817)
- September 10 – Amy Levy, English feminist poet and novelist (suicide, born 1861)
- September 23
  - Wilkie Collins, English novelist (born 1824)
  - Eliza Cook, English poet (born 1818)
- October 25 – Émile Augier, French dramatist (born 1820)
- November 18 – William Allingham, Irish poet (born 1824)
- November 20 – August Ahlqvist, Finnish professor, poet, scholar of the Finno-Ugric languages, author, and literary critic (born 1826)
- December 10 – Ludwig Anzengruber, Austrian poet (born 1839)
- December 12 – Robert Browning, English poet (born 1812)
- December 17 – Thomas Purnell, Welsh-born English drama critic and essayist (born 1834
- December 23 – Constance Naden, English poet and philosopher (born 1858)
- December 30 – Ion Creangă, Romanian writer (born 1837)

== Awards ==
- Gaisford Prize – Harold Trevor Baker

== Sources ==
- Thwaite, Ann. A.A. Milne: His Life. London: Faber and Faber, 1990. ISBN 0571138888
