= Garshin =

Garshin (Russian: Гаршин) is a Russian masculine surname derived from the masculine surname Gerasim, its feminine counterpart is Garshina. The surname may refer to the following notable people:

- Vsevolod Garshin (1855–1888), Russian author of short stories
- Yevgeny Garshin (1860–1931), Russian teacher, novelist and publisher, brother of Vsevolod
