= A Nervous Breakdown =

1889 short story by Anton Chekhov

- Short story by Anton Chekhov
- 1954 illustration by Alexander Mogilevsky
- Original title: Припадок
- Country: Russian Empire
- Language: Russian

Publication
- Published in: In the Memory of Garshin
- Publisher: Adolf Marks (1900)
- Publication date: January 29, 1889

Chronology
Sleepy	The Bet

"A Nervous Breakdown" (Russian: Припадок, romanized: Pripadok) is an 1889 short story by Anton Chekhov.

== Publication ==
The story first appeared in the charity compilation In the Memory of V.M. Garshin (Памяти В. М. Гаршина), published in Saint Petersburg in January of that year. In a revised version, it made its way into another collection, Gloomy People (Хмурые люди, Khmurye lyudi, 1890). With some further edits, Chekhov included it into Volume 5 of his Collected Works, published by Adolf Marks in 1899–1901. During its author's lifetime the story was translated into German, Serbo-Croatian and Swedish languages.

== Plot summary ==
Vasilyev, a law student, is persuaded by his friends Meyer and Rybnikov to take an evening cruise through the Lane, a red light district in Moscow. As they move from one brothel to another, Vasilyev gets more and more distressed with what he sees. Disgusted with the general air of apathy and indifference, he tries to strike up conversations with the women but is shocked by the dullness of the response. His attempts at constructing a more or less logical picture of the inner mechanism of this place, and the motivations behind it, fail too.

Vasilyev returns home overwhelmed with feelings of guilt, shame and disgust. Here, feeling the symptoms of the approaching nervous breakdown, a condition familiar to him, he spends a sleepless night trying to come up with some kind of project to 'save' all those women who apparently fail to see that they have been reduced to the status of animals. Two days later, delirious and mumbling of suicide, he is delivered by his friends to the psychiatrist Mikhail Sergeyevich.

Vasilyev tries to speak about the plight of those 'fallen' women, but gets a lukewarm response from the specialist. Still, the prolonged talk, combined with some medicine he takes, makes him feel better. He departs, with the receipts for potassium bromide and morphine. More or less calmed down, he feels confused and quite ashamed of his unnecessary outbreak.

== Background ==
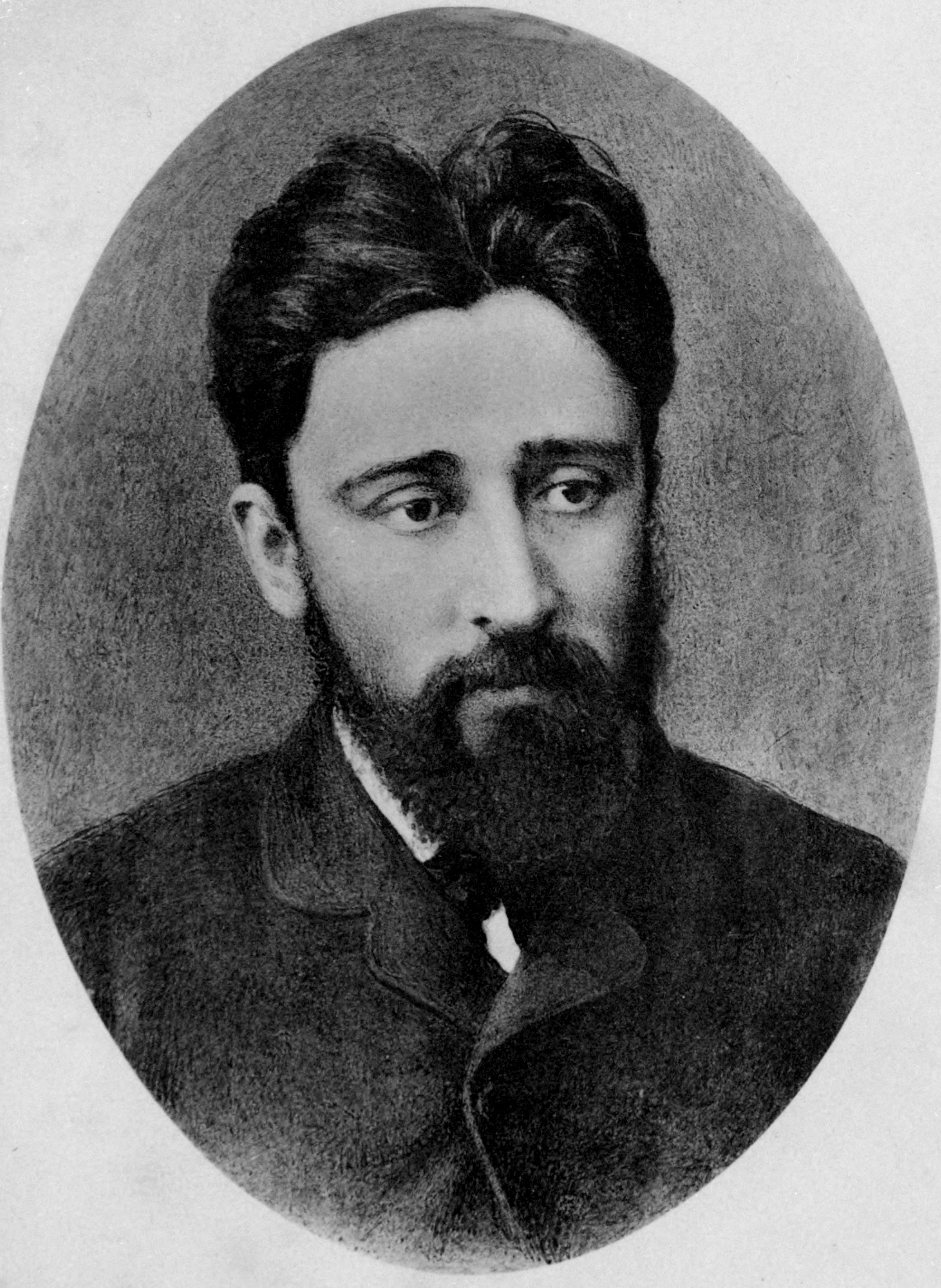
Garshin in 1885

In March 1888, Russia was shocked by the news of the tragic death of Vsevolod Garshin. The writer, noted for his sensitivity to social injustice and great compassion for suffering people, died in a hospital five days after he threw himself down the stairwell from the fourth floor of the house he lived in. Almost immediately, two groups of writers started to collect money for the Garshin monument, as well as literary tributes. One, centered around the newspaper Novosti, was headed by Kazimir Barantsevich, and another, organized by the staff of Severny Vestnik, by Alexey Pleshcheyev.

On 19 March, Barantsevich asked Chekhov by post to contribute to the collection. "Whatever you will, regardless of whether it had been published before or not, anything would be welcome," he wrote. The following day, Chekhov sent an enthusiastic reply, promising to "send something for the collection" and noting that such ideas, "beside their direct goal, serve as a uniting force for the writers' community which, even if not numerous, are still disparate. The more shoulder to shoulder feeling we'll have, the more we'll support each other, the sooner we'll learn to value and respect one another."

On 30 March, Pleshcheyev too asked Chekhov to provide some work for his tribute to Garshin, mentioning the Novosti-related project, in a rather negative light, characterizing it as superficial. For a time, the hope remained that the two parties would join forces, then the disagreements became obvious and Chekhov in another letter to Pleshcheyev expressed his disappointment with the split. Still, he decided to respond to the latter's request and ignore the Barantsevich-edited collection.

On 15 September, Chekhov wrote to Pleshcheyev: "It would be a shame for me to fail to respond to your request, for... [people like Garshin] are very dear to me... But I do not have a single [story at the moment] that would fit such a collection... Probably just one little idea: a young man, a Garshin type, strong personality, honest and deeply sensitive, finds himself in a brothel for the first time in his life. Serious things demand serious treatment, so I intend to be quite straightforward about it. But what if I am able to make it a depressive read, which is indeed my intention, and it will turn out good enough to make into the collection, can you guarantee, that the censors or the editorial staff itself won't throw away from it things that I myself regard as important?.. If you can, I promise to write the story in the course of two evenings."

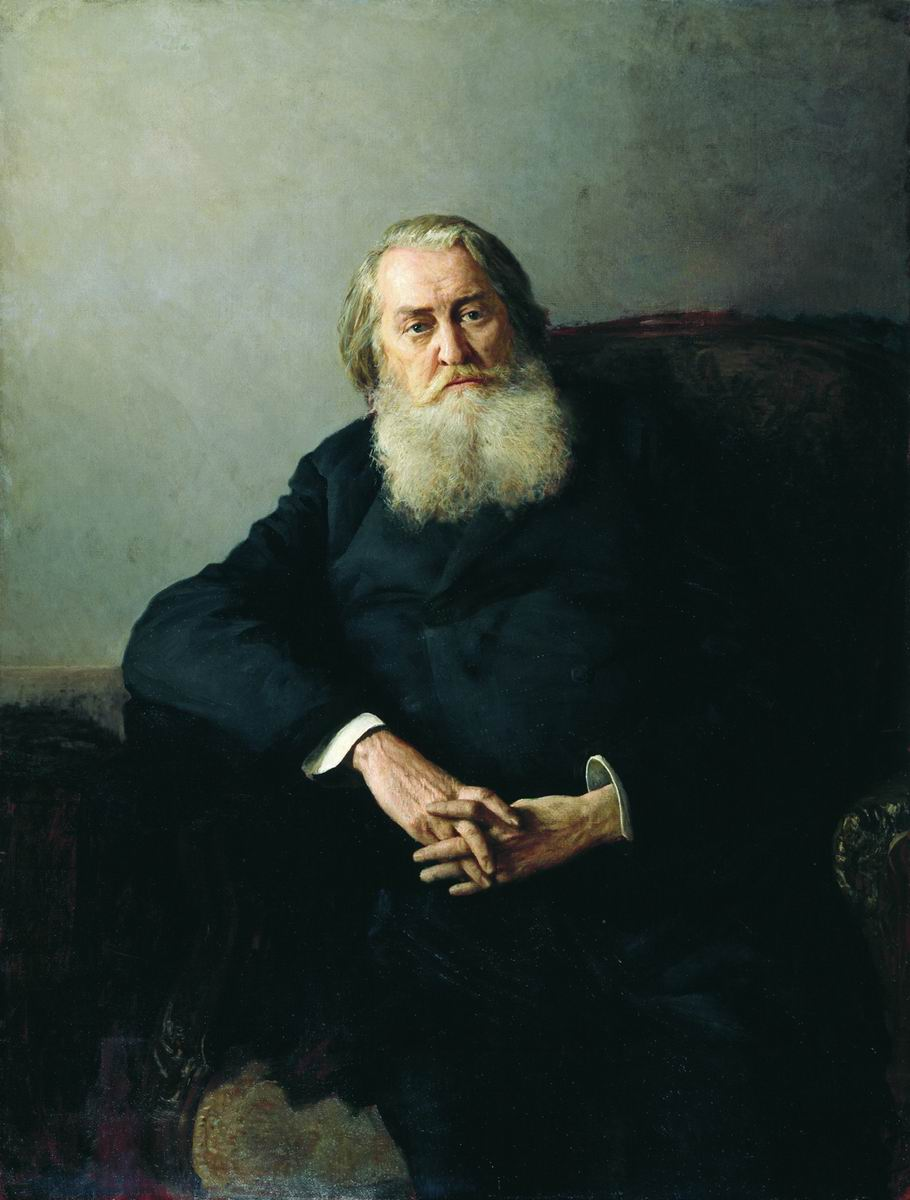
Pleshcheyev's 1888 portrait by Nikolai Yaroshenko

In response, Pleshcheyev promised "that will be an uncensored collection" and not a single word will be changed by the editors. On 9 October 1888, Chekhov informed Pleshcheyev that he was going to start writing the next day, and will finish it in a week. Yet it took him a month to complete the story. "You are killing us... For God's sake, please hurry up," Pleshcheyev implored him in the 2 November letter. "The work is on its way, and 1/4 of it is ready... I describe here the Sobolev Lane with its brothels, but carefully, without wallowing in mud or resorting to strong language," Chekhov assured him on 3 November. On November 10, he added: "I try to be modest, to the point of boredom. The subject matter seems to me to be so delicate, that any detail could be easily exaggerated into elephantine proportions. I hope my story won't stick out of this collection's general picture. It is sad, dour and serious."

On 11 November, in a letter to Alexey Suvorin he wrote: "Today I finished the story for the Garshin memorial collection, and that's huge relief... Why don't you ever say anything in your newspaper about prostitution? For it is a horrible evil. Our Sobolev Lane is a slave market."

Finally, on 13 November the story was sent to Pleshcheyev. "By no means a family read, very ungracious... But my conscience is now clear. The promise fulfilled, besides, I gave the late Garshin the kind of credit I wanted to, and was capable of. As a medic, I think I've described this psychological ailment the right way, in terms of the psychological science. As for the girls, in the days gone by I used to be quite an authority in this matter."

Upon receiving "A Nervous Breakdown", Pleshcheyev sent Chekhov a letter. "I liked this story for its seriousness, reserve, and the idea as such. Still, we are here all wary of censorship, it does not like this subject being touched at all. Guards chastity with all the severity." His premonitions as to possible problems with censorship proved right later, in 1902, when the fifth volume of the Collected Works by A.P. Chekhov published by Marks, was banned from public libraries and reading-halls, and "A Nervous Breakdown" was cited among the three short stories deemed politically incorrect. "[It] sermonizes against prostitution, but at the same time implies that any single man's attempts to fight this evil are doomed to be futile," a member of the Education ministry's Scientific committee Evgraf Kovalevsky explained.

== Critical reception ==
In general, the story was positively reviewed. Among those who lauded it were Ivan Gorbunov-Posadov and Dmitry Grigorovich, who, on 27 December 1888, sent Chekhov a letter containing a thorough analysis of the novella (as he called it). He praised the story's "noble humanism" as well as the descriptions of nature. "The literary community, students, Evreyinova, Pleshcheyev, women and others praised my Breakdown to high heavens, but only Grigorovich spotted the first snow episode," wrote Chekhov in his 23 December 1888 letter to Suvorin. Later, in the 3 January letter, he enquired: "Why haven’t you spoken a single word on In the Memory of Garshin? This is unfair." Whether Suvorin replied by letter or not is unknown, but Novoye Vremya, which originally ignored the compilation, responded in its own way, by publishing in January 1889 a negative review, by Viktor Burenin, which outraged Pleshcheyev.

On 22 December 1888, Novosti i Birzhevaya Gazeta (The News and the Stockbroker Gazette) briefly commented on the release of both of the Garshin tributes. "Even if no masterpieces are to be found in them, you'll come across fine stories as "Raven the Petitioner" by Shchedrin, "Nervous Breakdown" by An. Chekhov or "On the Volga" by V. Korolenko which you'll read with delight," Alexander Skabichevsky wrote. There were two reviews (on 29 December 1888, and 5 January 1889) of the collection in Novosti Dnya (News of the Day), both pointing at "Nervous Breakdown" as its strongest piece. After the third edition of the Moody People collection came out, the magazine Trud reviewed it, again pointing at "A Nervous Breakdown" as its outstanding feature.
