= W. Reid Blair =

William Reid Blair, DVS (June 7, 1875—March 3, 1949), better known as W. Reid Blair, worked at the New York Zoological Park (managed by the New York Zoological Society, now the Wildlife Conservation Society) from 1902 to 1940. He began as assistant veterinarian and pathologist and retired from the zoo as its director. During his 38-year career at the zoo, he implemented many advancements in the care of captive animals, and he focused on the educational capacity of zoos. Additionally, it was Blair who relaxed the insistence of William T. Hornaday, the zoo's first director, on the use of the formal name "New York Zoological Park" in favor of the more familiar "Bronx Zoo."

== Early life ==
Blair was born on June 7, 1875, in Philadelphia. His interest in animals and their care began during summers on his grandfather's farm in Massachusetts, where he lived after 1885. It was further developed during his studies at McGill University, from which he received a DVS degree from the Faculty of Comparative Medicine in 1902 and an honorary LLD in 1928.

== Bronx Zoo career ==
Blair began his career with the Bronx Zoo in 1902 as assistant veterinarian to Dr. Frank Miller. The following year, Blair took over as head veterinarian. After serving for two years (1918–1919) as chief of the 4th Veterinarian Corps in the US Army in France and Germany, he returned to the zoo and, in 1922, was appointed the zoo's assistant director. Upon the June 1926 retirement of William T. Hornaday, the zoo's first director, Blair became director of the Bronx Zoo. He remained in that post for nearly 14 years until his own retirement on May 1, 1940.

== Later life ==
After his retirement, Blair maintained his interest in the Bronx Zoo, continuing to attend New York Zoological Society meetings. Described as "genial, social and outgoing," he was greatly loved by his friends and associates. He died in New York on March 3, 1949.

== Veterinary achievements ==
Blair was committed both to the care of zoo animals and to the scientific study of them. "He came to the Zoo with a two-fold purpose: to lengthen and benefit the lives of the creatures in captivity, and to furnish whatever solid contributions to biology, zoology and medicine could be made from such a wonderful observation post as a zoo." He encouraged students and professors to make use of the research facilities available at the zoo.

== Achievements as director of Bronx Zoo ==
Upon becoming director, Blair submitted to the executive committee a seven-point list of suggestions that embodied his vision for the zoo:

- Enlargement of the collection of the wild cattle of the world;
- Experimentation with the Hagenbeck idea of barless exhibits, using moats instead of fences or bars;
- Creation of a special exhibit for anthropoid apes;
- A facility to promote breeding of big cats, monkeys, and small mammals;
- A separate building for the exhibit of the zoo's very large collection of parrots and other psittacine birds;
- An auditorium for lectures and member meetings;
- A cooperative research program with local universities.

Although many of these goals were realized after Blair's departure, their origins can be traced to Blair. These include the 1941 opening of the African Plains exhibit—a multi-species "barless" exhibit relying on moats—and the 1950 opening of another "barless" exhibit, the Great Apes House, which was eventually replaced in 1999 by the opening of the Congo Gorilla Forest.

Blair was an avid and active collector of new species for the zoo. He authorized and sometimes accompanied numerous collecting trips and brought back many unusual animals, several of which were first exhibited in captivity at the Bronx Zoo. Among these were the first Bongo ("Doreen") and the first Okapi to be seen in the US. He sent the first expedition to New Guinea, which vastly expanded the zoo's collection of birds, especially birds-of-paradise.

Blair was determined to promote the idea that the purpose of a zoo was as an "educational rather than as a purely recreational undertaking." He did much to advance this belief, beginning with winning a 1927 Ohio lawsuit over a bequest to the New York Zoological Society as an educational institution. Shortly thereafter, he hired the Bronx Zoo's first docent, Claude W. Leister, a biology instructor at Cornell University, as assistant to the director and curator of educational activities.

== Other activities and achievements ==
Blair was committed to wildlife protection, and for many years held the position of executive secretary of the American Committee for International Wildlife Protection. He served as professor of comparative pathology at New York University's Veterinary College. In 1940, he received a Merit Citation from the Park Association of New York City.

== Citations ==
- Blair, W. Reid. In the Zoo. New York: Charles Scribner's Sons, 1929.
- Bridges, William. Gathering of Animals: An Unconventional History of the New York Zoological Society. New York: Harper & Row, 1974.
- "Bring 'Em Up Alive" [series]. New York World-Telegram, June 1940.
- Crandall, Lee S. "W. Reid Blair. In Memoriam." Animal Kingdom 52.2 (1949): 59-60.
- Leister, Claude W. Present Day Mammals. New York: New York Zoological Society, 1931.
