= Mount Hornaday =

Mountain in Wyoming, United States

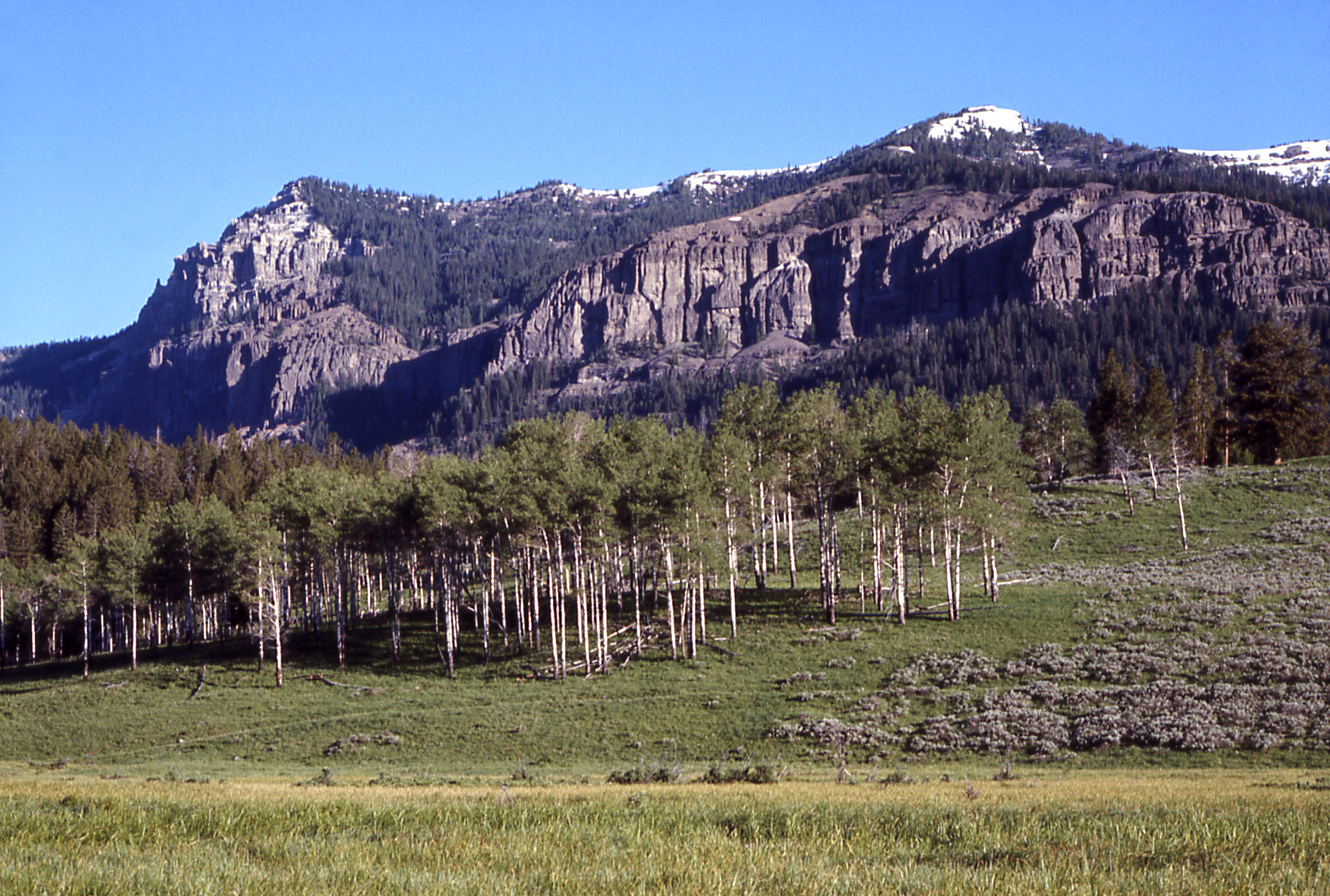
- As viewed from Pebble Creek

Highest point
- Elevation: 10,003 ft (3,049 m)
- Coordinates: 44°56′42″N 110°08′46″W

Geography
- Location within Wyoming
- Location: Yellowstone National Park, Park County, Wyoming
- Parent range: Absaroka Range
- Topo map: Mount Hornaday

Mount Hornaday el. 10,003 feet (3,049 m) is a mountain peak in the northeast section of Yellowstone National Park in the Absaroka Range, Wyoming. The peak was named in 1938 for naturalist William Temple Hornaday, a former director of the New York Zoological Gardens who championed the cause of saving the American Bison from extinction.

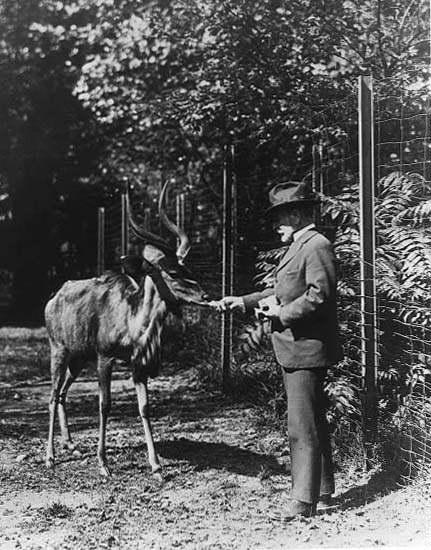
Mount Hornaday's namesake, William Temple Hornaday

== See also ==
- Mountains and mountain ranges of Yellowstone National Park
