= Blind Love (novel) =

Unfinished novel by Wilkie Collins

Blind Love was an unfinished novel by Wilkie Collins, which he left behind on his death in 1889. It was completed by historian and novelist Sir Walter Besant.

Collins's novel had already begun serialization in The Illustrated London News, even though the author had not yet completed it. (It ran from 6 July 1889, to 28 December of that year.) When it was published in book form on 1890, the volume included Besant's preface explaining the circumstances of the collaboration.

Collins had started writing the novel in 1887, when newspapers were full of stories about Fenian violence in the wake of the previous year's defeat of the First Irish Home Rule Bill. Collins frequented Ye Olde Cheshire Cheese off London's Fleet Street and borrowed some traits for his male protagonist from John O'Connor Power who was also well known in the convivial tavern. Collins links the Irish Question to the Woman Question. The novel recounts the story of Lord Harry Norland, a member of a squad of political assassins; the book's heroine is Iris Henley, a bold and nonconformist Englishwoman who falls in love with the Irish Norland despite his criminal activities (the "blind love" of the title). The title was originally to have been Lord Harry, the colloquial name for the devil.
