= The Extermination of the American Bison =

1889 book on bison ecology in the United States

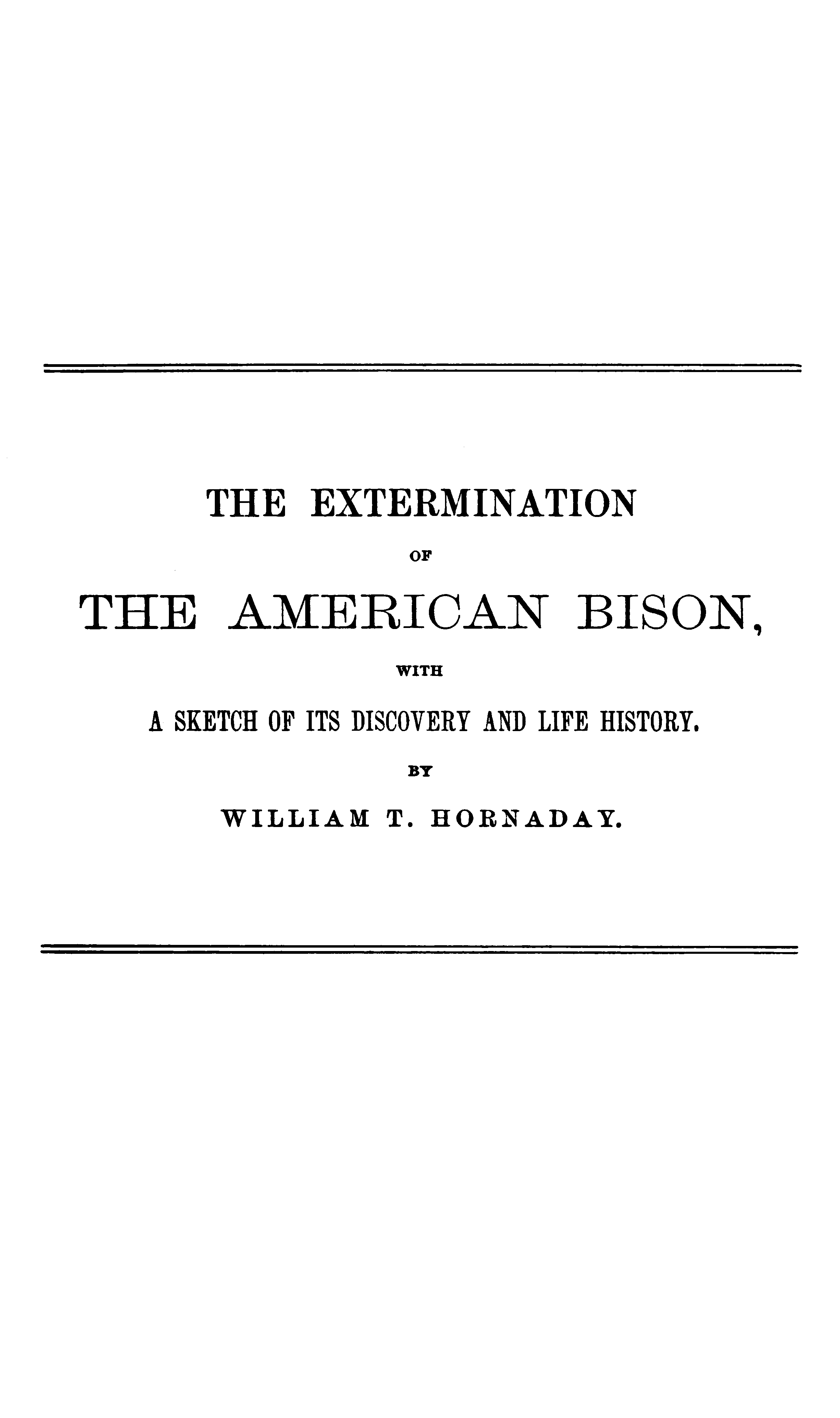
- Title page
- Author: William Temple Hornaday
- Publisher: Government Printing Office
- Publication date: 1889

The Extermination of the American Bison is a book by William Temple Hornaday first published in 1889 by the Government Printing Office. It was reprinted from a report Hornaday wrote for the Smithsonian Institution in the years 1886–87.

Extermination contains an exhaustive account of bison ecology and the story of the near-entire destruction of the bison population in the United States. The book argues for the consequent necessity of protecting the small number of bison then in Yellowstone National Park.

The book is divided into three parts. The first relates to the habits, geographical distribution, and probable population of the bison before the European settlement of North America. The second describes the extermination of the animal by industrial-scale bison hunting. It argues that the speed of extermination has been increased by unnecessary slaughter and the lack of legal protection of the bison population, among other things. The third part describes the Smithsonian's 1886 expedition to Montana to obtain specimens for the National Museum of Natural History before bison went extinct in North America. A census of the animals known to exist in captivity on January 1, 1889, showed 256 specimens in the United States and abroad.

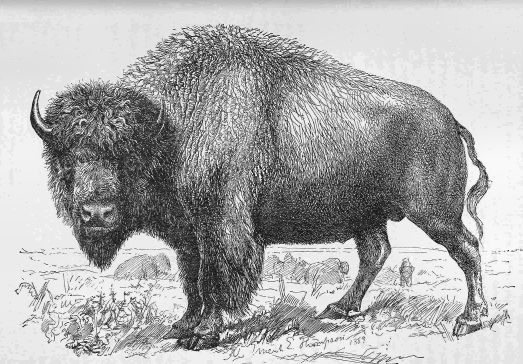
Illustration of a bison from the 1889 publication of Extermination.

One contemporary writer notes that a number of scholars consider Extermination to be "the first important text of the American wildlife conservation movement".

== See also ==
- Conservation of American bison
