= Yevgeny Garshin =

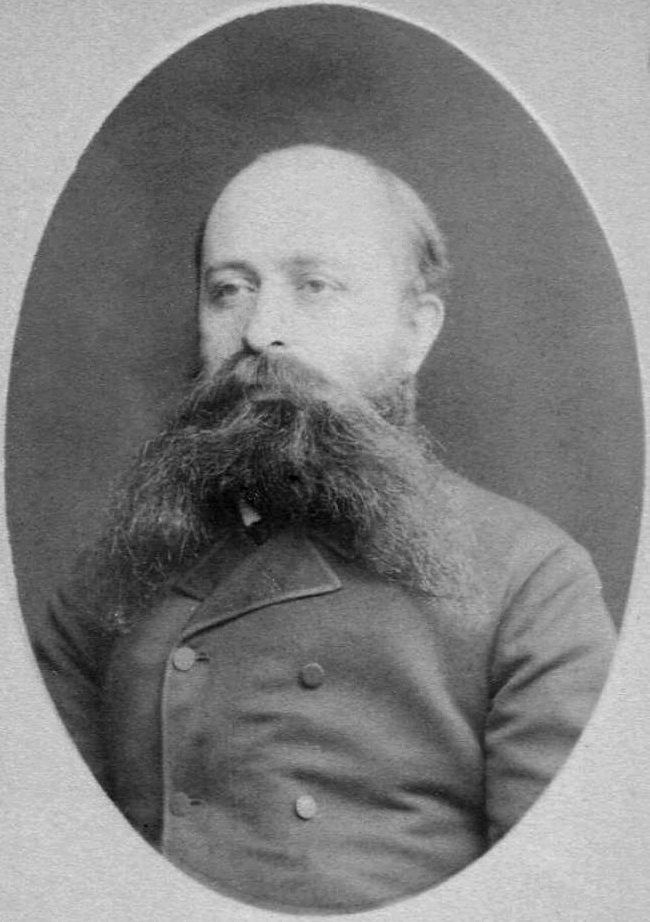
- Garshin in 1888
- Born: 1860; Bakhmut county, Russian Empire
- Died: 1931
- Education: Saint Petersburg University

Yevgeny Mikhailovich Garshin (Russian: Евгений Михайлович Гаршин; 1860–1931) was a Russian teacher, novelist, publisher, director of the Commercial College in Taganrog (1901), younger brother of the Russian writer Vsevolod Garshin.

== Early years ==
Garshin was born in 1860 in Bakhmut county of Yekaterinoslav Governorate. In 1884 he graduated from the Faculty for History and Philology at the Saint Petersburg University. Since 1886 he lectured Russian literature at various gymnasiums of Saint Petersburg.

== Chekhov Circle and Chekhov Museum in Taganrog ==
Around 1900 Garshin moved to Taganrog, where he was appointed director of the Taganrog Commercial College in 1901. In 1904, soon after death of Anton Chekhov, he initiated the creation of the Chekhov Circle. He was elected chairman of that circle and submitted an application to the Taganrog City Council, soliciting municipal acquisition of the Birth house of Anton Chekhov in Taganrog. The memorial plate was placed in 1910. This further led to creation of the memorial museum Birth House of Anton Chekhov in 1926, following the municipal acquisition in 1915. It is noteworthy that before moving to Taganrog, Garshin criticized earlier works by Anton Chekhov. Though living in his home city he became one of Chekhov's fans and made a lot to commemorate the writer.

== Literary legacy ==
In 1911, Garshin left Taganrog for Simferopol. After his departure, the Chekhov Circle officially existed until 1920, but was gradually losing its importance with inauguration of the Chekhov Library and Museum in 1914. Very little is known about the life of Yevgeny Garshin in the Soviet period. He died in Leningrad in 1931.

Garshin is known for his books Novgorod Antiquities (1892), Russian Literature of the 19th century (1891), Social Importance of the Archaeology (1888), Three Poems (1889), Children-Crusaders (1891) and many more. He also published several articles in Istoricheskiy Vestnik (Historical Bulletin), Russkoe Bogatstvo, Zvezda (Star), Russkaya Shkola (Russian School) and other bulletins.
