= Sweetbrier; or the Flower Girl of New York =

1889 play

- Original language: English
- Written by: Lizzie May Elwyn
- Genre: Melodrama
- Setting: New York City, the North American countryside

Premiere
- Date: 1889

Sweetbrier; or the Flower Girl of New York is a six-act drama written by Lizzie May Elwyn, first published in 1889.

== Plot ==
The play opens with the sickly thief, Carlos Dare, writing his deathbed confession. Carlos has raised his ward, Pauline Lindsey (nicknamed Sweetbrier), under the belief that she is his biological daughter, but in reality, she was born to Alice and Ralph Lindsey. Ralph’s identical twin, Roscoe , lured his brother to South America and swapped places with him there, leaving Ralph to serve his sibling's jail sentence. When Alice realized that the man who returned to her house resembled but was, in fact, not her husband, Roscoe placed her in an insane asylum and hired Carlos and Mike, an Irishman, to dispose of her child. Neither had the heart to do so, with Carlos deciding to raise Pauline as his own child, unbeknownst to Roscoe. Mike arrives with Alice, who has been broken out of the insane asylum. After she is informed by Carlos that her child is alive, Alice is promptly hurried off by Mike lest she be captured by Roscoe’s gangster associates. Pauline arrives to find her adopted father dying. Carlos gives her the piece of paper and tells her that he is not her real father, and that he is sending her to live with her maternal grandfather. After Pauline leaves Mike enters and announces that Alice has been broken out of the insane asylum by the gangsters, who plan to make her their ringleader's concubine.

Pauline arrives at her maternal grandfather, Silas’s, house. Having assumed Ralph’s identity, Roscoe is living with Silas, along with several of the former’s children- Earle, a boy he allegedly found on the street, and Inez, his biological daughter through a former marriage. Inez, vain and coquettish, immediately dislikes her scrappy relation, but John finds himself fond of her. Roscoe discovers Carlos’ confession and hides it. Victor, a foppish youth (who incidentally happens to be the son of the gangsters’ ringleader) enters the house, and asks for Pauline's hand. Pauline, who finds him bothersome, is surprised that he has taken the time to follow her here. Later, Inez attempts to induce Earle to wed her, but Victor reveals that she is married. Pauline and Earle begin to fall in love with one another.

One year later, and the two have married. The third act opens with Pauline and Silas’s servant, Moses, dancing together. Earle discovers them and leaves, disgusted, admonishing Pauline for her uncouth behavior; Earle sees this episode as one of many instances of his wife's vulgarity, which has bothered him as of late. Pauline sadly wonders if Earle still loves her. Pauline’s grandmother, Abigail, attempts to reassure her. Later, Victor arrives, and privately addressing Earle, implies that he will have Sweetbrier for himself, no matter what. Earle is disgusted. After Earle leaves, Victor reveals to Pauline that he has a paper containing information about her mother. Victor implies that the information in the document is crucial to saving the life of Pauline’s birth mother, who is in dire distress. He then tells her that he will only give her the paper if she leaves with him and becomes his mistress. Pauline refuses, but discreetly grabs a pocket knife or dagger from a nearby table and follows Victor into the forest. Pauline is then discovered standing next to Victor’s bloodied corpse, holding the document in her hand, and is promptly arrested- but not before the paper falls into the possession of the impostor and his equally unscrupulous daughter.

A year has passed. Pauline is living incognito in New York City along with Moses, who aided her in escaping from prison. She is on the lookout for her mother. In the meantime, Silas and the rest of the family- with the exception of Inez, who has died of a mysterious illness- have made their way to the city after Roscoe’s death. Inez had tried to burn the documents, but they were confiscated by the rest of the family. Silas’s wife is separated from her husband, and falls into the hands of the gangsters, who are keeping Pauline’s mother as a hostage. After finding out from Silas that Alice can be found at “Pauper Lane, Rogue's Rookery”- which unbeknownst to Silas, is a gangster's hideout, Pauline infiltrates said hideout by scaling various telephone poles as well as rooftops, and reunites with her mother- but when she encounters the police officer who arrested her the year prior, she shoots herself to avoid incarceration.

One year later, Pauline has recovered and is now a belle of society, living with her mother and father in a lavish New York City home.

In the meantime, Earle discovers that he is actually the child of Lord and Lady Wayne, but had been kidnapped by Roscoe Lindsey as a youth. Pauline recalls meeting Earle in London, where disguised herself as a well-to-do woman by the name of Lina by styling her hair differently, which apparently was sufficient enough to fool the newly re-christened Lord Wayne. Believing Pauline to be dead, Earle is currently set on wooing “Lina”. Pauline refuses to reveal her identity to Earle- in spite of Alice’s protests- as she believes he does not truly love her. Earle arrives,with Silas and company, and while conversing with “Lina”, mentions his past love, Pauline. “Lina” expresses horror at the prospect of a nobleman harboring a passion for what she terms a street urchin, but Earle attempts to defend Pauline’s character. Suddenly, Earle manages to deduce Pauline’s identity, and the pair reconcile. Earle reveals that it was he who murdered Victor, but does not elaborate further.

== Revival & Reception ==
In 1940, the Roadside Theatre, in Washington, D.C., staged a three-act adaptation of Sweetbrier. The Evening Star praised the production, lauding the cast's acting while terming the play a "dim-witted" but entertaining melodrama.

Writing for The Washington Daily News, Frank Acosta Jr. came to a similar conclusion, writing, "Sweetbrier was mighty serious stuff when it was produced, and that's what made it such a howl last night." Like the reviewer for the Evening Star, he praised the actors' performances.

In his review of the Roadside Theatre's production, Donald Kirkley, writing for The Baltimore Sun, noting Richard P. Crekely's adaptational changes, wrote that "the original flavor of the lines has been retained." Kirkley went on to describe Sweetbrier as a cliched melodrama, entertaining because of its unintentional hilarity.
