= Lizzie May Elwyn =

American dramatist

Lizzie May Elwyn was an American dramatist active during the late nineteenth and early twentieth centuries. Her plays addressed slavery and temperance.

Her play Millie the Quadroon is set in the Southern United States before the abolition of slavery, and was marketed as "in the style of Uncle Tom's Cabin". Her drama, Switched Off, included a pro-temperance Irishman and another who is pro-drinking. It included instructions on staging and costumes.

Another temperance melodrama by Elwyn, Dot, the Miner's Daughter, was described as "a vivid and realistic emotional and comic play" in 1897. Dot was revived in 1938, and Sweetbrier; or The Flower Girl of New York was revived in 1940, both in productions at the Roadside in Washington, D.C. "Sweetbrier was mighty serious stuff when it was first produced, and that's what made it a howl last night," reported a reviewer. "Lizzie May, bless her, was the mistress of every melodramatic cliche and no matter what plot snarling it involved, she made use of them all in Sweetbrier," wrote another.

== Publications ==
Millie, the quadroon

Murder will out, a farce in one act for six female characters

- Elwyn, Lizzie May (1888). Millie, The Quadroon; or, Out Of Bondage. Ames' Series of Standard and Minor Drama, no. 251. Clyde, Ohio: Ames' Publishing Company.
- Gibson, Ad. H.; Elwyn, Lizzie May (1888). "A Ruined Life; or, The Curse of Intemperance". That Awful Carpet-Bag: An Original Farce in Three Scenes. Ames' Series of Standard and Minor Drama. Clyde, Ohio: Ames' Publishing Company.
- Elwyn, Lizzie May (1888). Dot, the Miner's Daughter; or One Glass Of Wine. Ames' Series of Standard and Minor Drama, no. 254. Clyde, Ohio: Ames' Publishing Company.
- Elwyn, Lizzie May (1889). Sweetbrier; or, The Flower Girl of New York. Ames' Series of Standard and Minor Drama, no. 266. Clyde, Ohio: Ames' Publishing Company.
- Elwyn, Lizzie May (1890). Murder Will Out, a Farce in One Act for Six Female Characters. New York City, NY: H. Roorbach.
- Elwyn, Lizzie May (1899). Switched Off, A Temperance Farce in One Act. Clyde, Ohio: Ames' Publishing Company.
- Elwyn, Lizzie May (1900). Rachel, the Fire Waif. Ames' Series of Standard and Minor Drama, no. 420. Clyde, Ohio: Ames' Publishing Company.
- Elwyn, Lizzie May (1904). Uncle Sams' Cooks: A Farce in One Act. Ames' Series of Standard and Minor Drama, no. 446. Clyde, Ohio: Ames' Publishing Company.
