= Vsevolod Garshin =

Russian author of short stories (1855–1888)

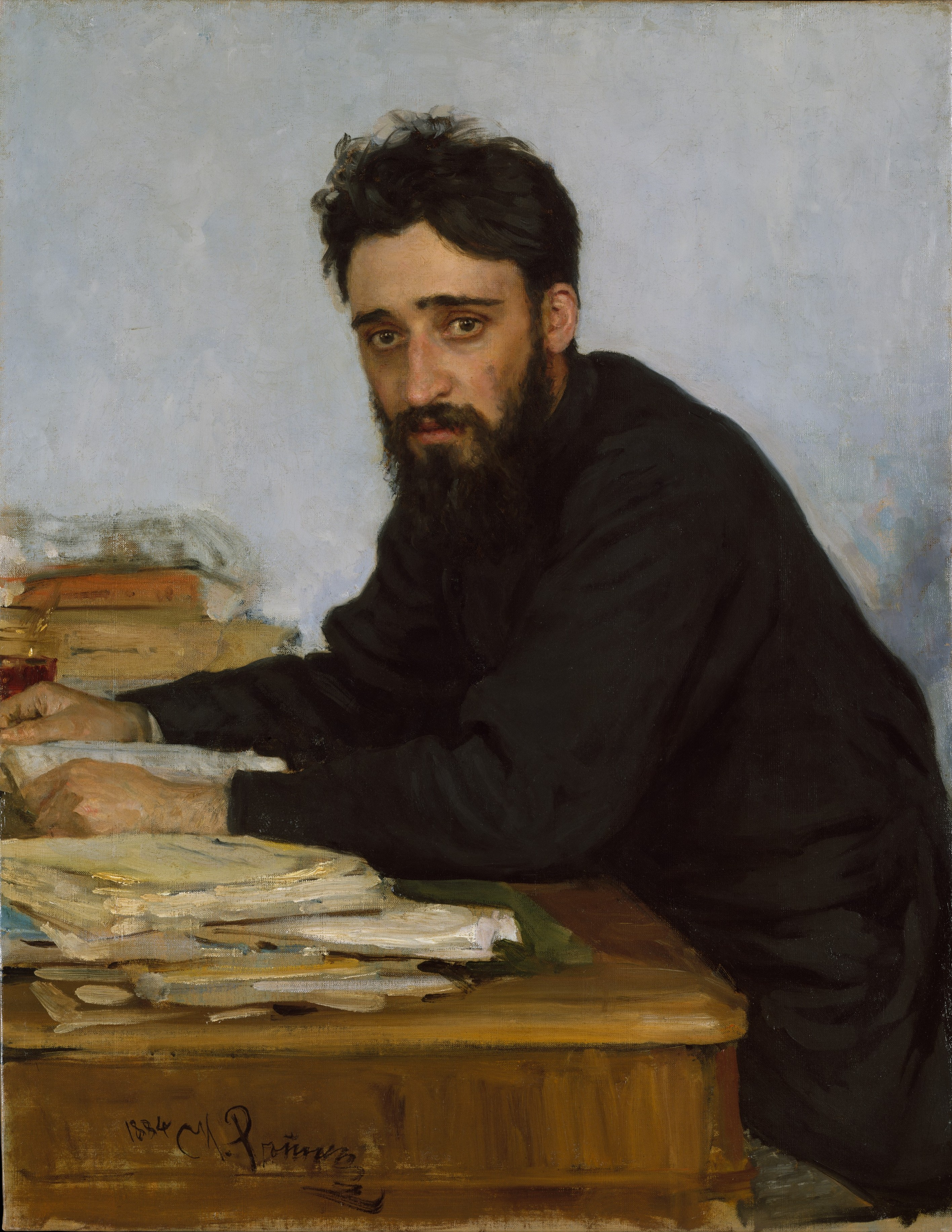
- Portrait of Vsevolod Garshin by Ilya Repin
- Born: Vsevolod Mikhailovich Garshin; February 14, 1855; Bakhmut uezd, Yekaterinoslav Governorate, Russian Empire
- Died: April 5, 1888 (aged 33); Saint Petersburg, Russian Empire
- Relatives: Yevgeny Garshin
- Military career
- Branch: Imperial Russian Army
- Conflicts: Russo-Turkish War

Vsevolod Mikhailovich Garshin (Russian: Всеволод Михайлович Гаршин; 14 February 1855 – 5 April 1888) was a Russian author of short stories.

== Life ==
Garshin was the son of an officer, from a family tracing its roots back to a 15th-century prince, who entered into the service of Ivan the Great. He attended secondary school and then the Saint Petersburg Mining Institute. He volunteered to serve in the army at the start of the Russo-Turkish War in 1877. He participated in the Balkans Campaign as a private, and was wounded in action. He was promoted to the rank of officer at the end of the war. He resigned his commission soon after in order to devote his time to literary efforts. He had previously published a number of articles in newspapers, mostly reviews of art exhibitions.

His experiences as a soldier provide the basis for his first stories, including the very first, "Four Days" (Russian: "Четыре дня"), based on a real incident. The narrative is organized as the interior monologue of a wounded soldier left for dead on the battlefield for four days, face to face with the corpse of a Turkish soldier he had killed. Garshin's empathy for all beings is already evident in this first story.

Despite early literary success, he had periodical bouts of mental illness. Garshin attempted to commit suicide by throwing himself down the stone stairs leading to his apartment building. Although his injuries were not immediately fatal, he died as a result of them in a hospital in April 1888, at the age of 33.

== Work ==
The essence of Garshin's personality is a "genius" for pity and compassion, as intense as Dostoevsky's but free from all the "Nietzschean", "underground", and "Karamazov" ingredients of the greater writer.

— D. S. Mirsky

Garshin's work is not voluminous: it consists of some twenty stories, all of them included in a single volume. His stories are characterized by a spirit of compassion and pity that some have compared to Dostoevsky's.

In "A Very Short Novel" he examines the infidelity of a woman to a crippled hero. The story displays Garshin's talent for concentration and lyrical irony. "That Which Was Not" and "Attalea Princeps" are fables with animals and plants in human situations. The second of these stories has a sense of tragic irony. In "Officer and Soldier-Servant" he is a forerunner of Chekhov; it is an excellently constructed story conveying an atmosphere of drab gloom and meaningless boredom. "From the Reminiscences of Private Ivanov" — the title story in the most recent English language collection of Garshin's work — has the same Russo-Turkish War setting of "Four Days", and includes as minor players the characters from "Officer and Soldier-Servant".

His best-known and most characteristic story is "A Red Flower"; it fits in the series of lunatic-asylum stories in Russian literature (including Gogol's "Diary of a Madman" (1835), Leskov's The Rabbit Warren (1894) and Chekhov's "Ward No. 6" (1892)). "A Red Flower" translated as "The Scarlet Blossom" by Virginia Mary Crawford appeared in the London journal Time in Aug 1890.

In 1883, Garshin was the model for the younger Ivan in Ilya Repin's painting Ivan the Terrible and His Son Ivan.

== Gallery ==
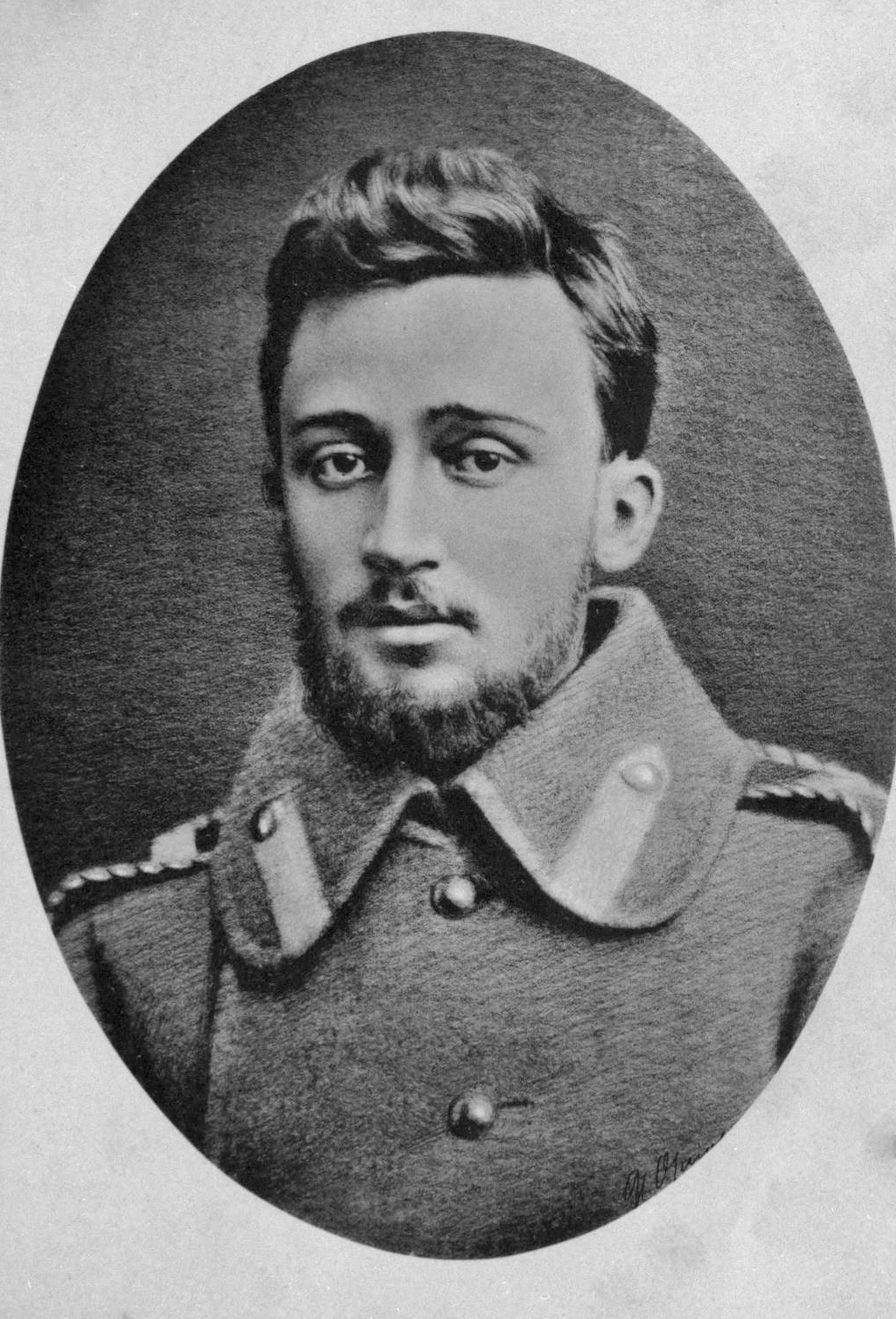
Garshin in 1877, during his service in the Russo-Turkish War

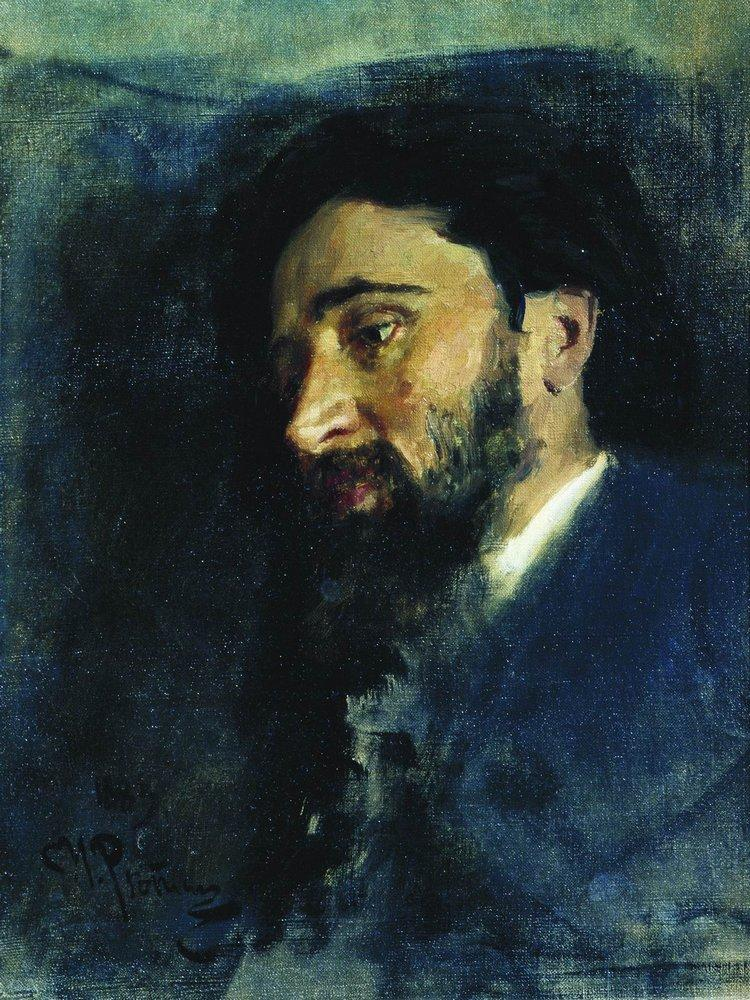
Vsevolod M. Garshin. Portrait by Ilya Repin (1883)

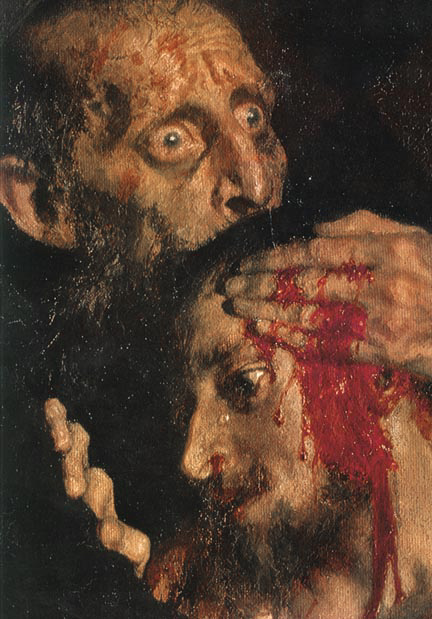
Garshin as Ivan the Terrible's son

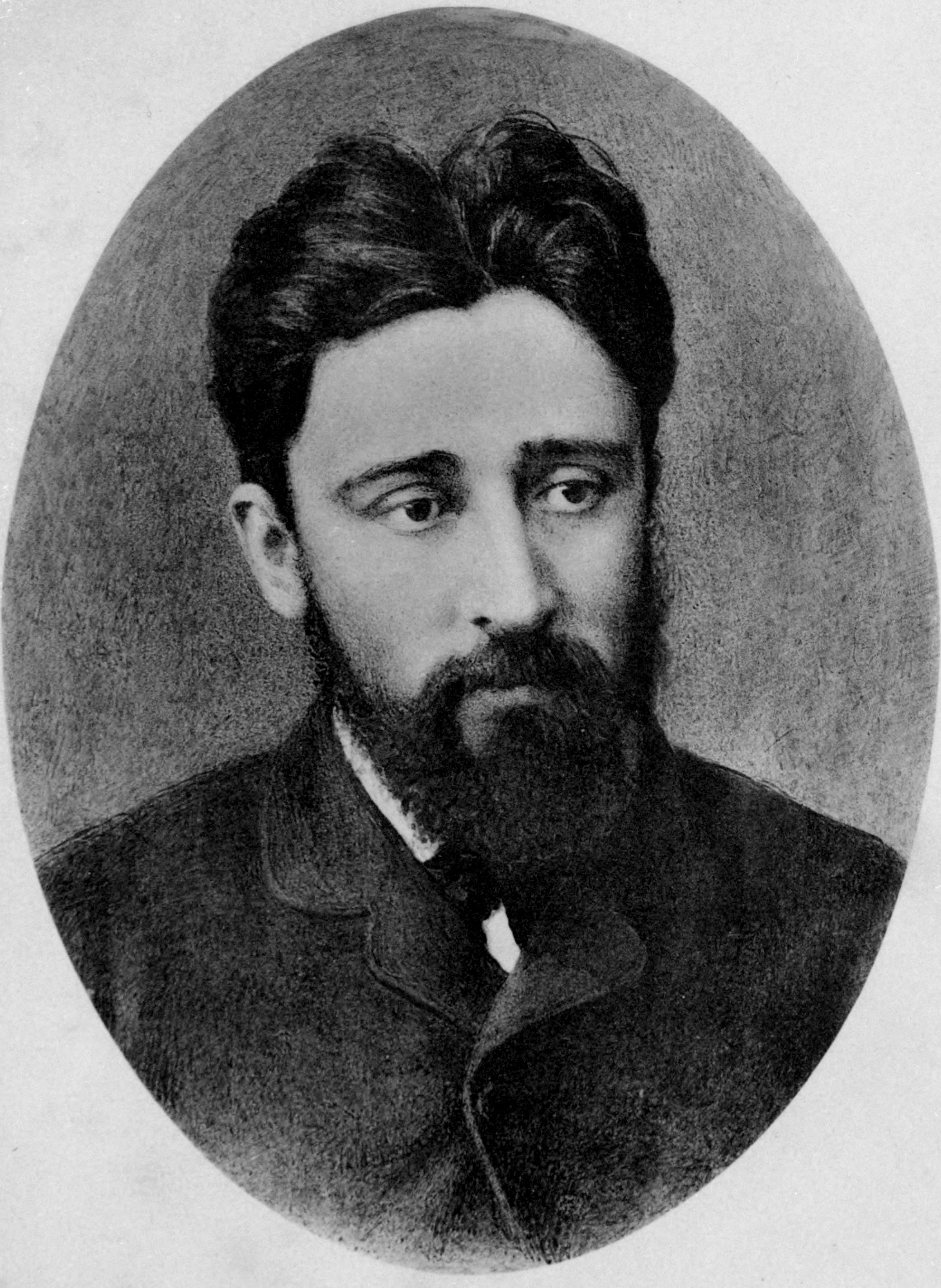
Garshin in 1885

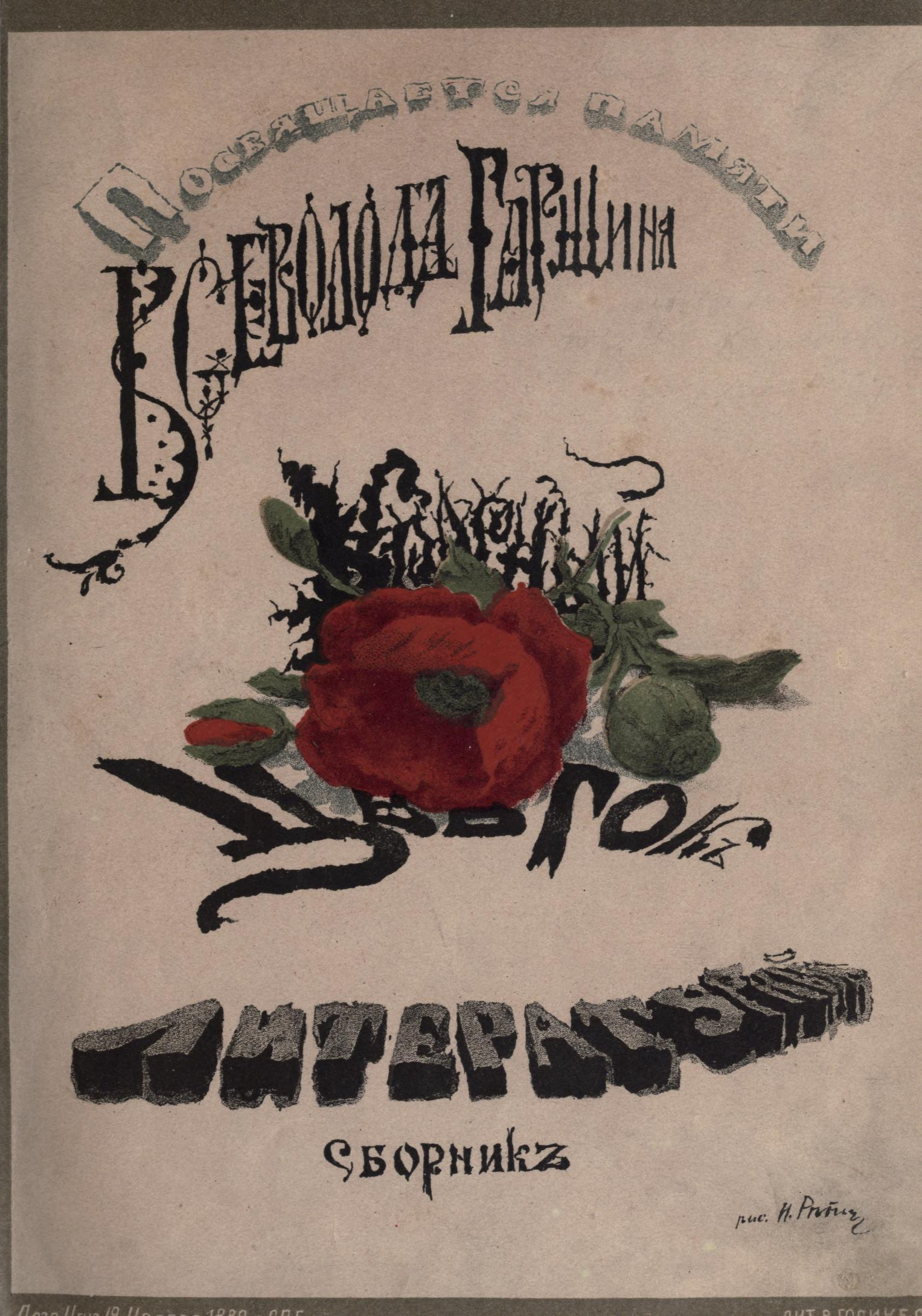
1885 cover of The Red Flower: A Literary Collection by Ilya Repin

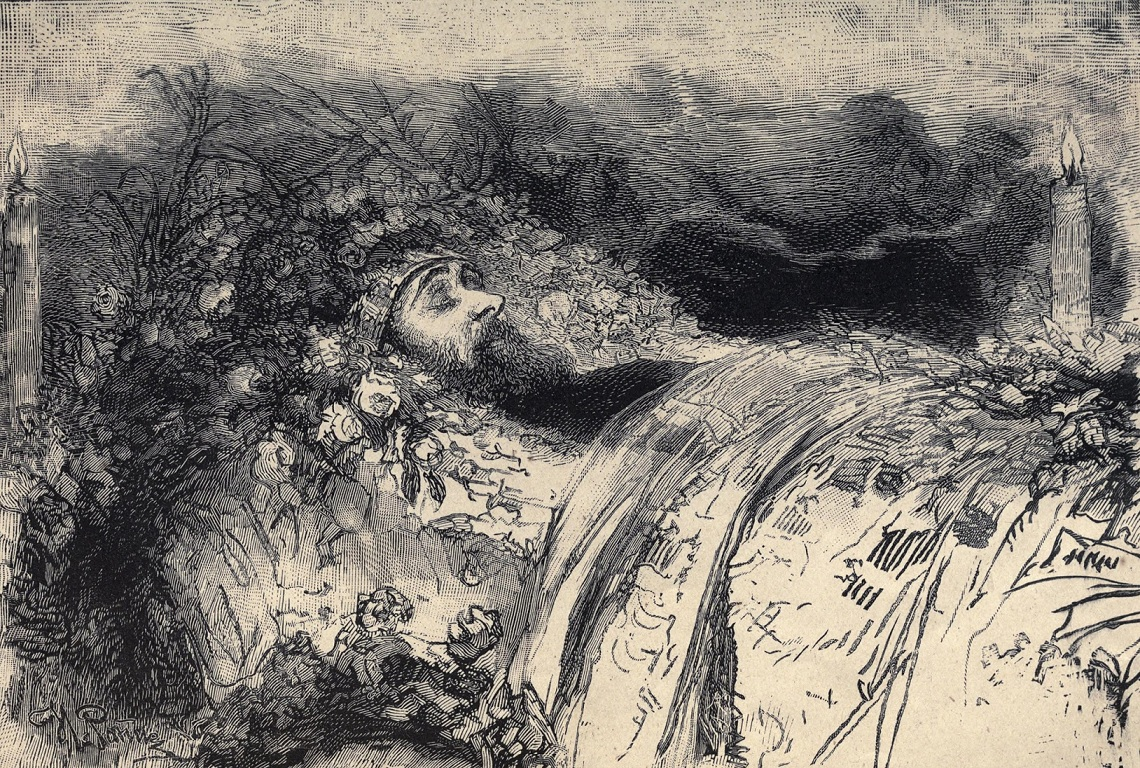
Garshin at his funeral in 1888

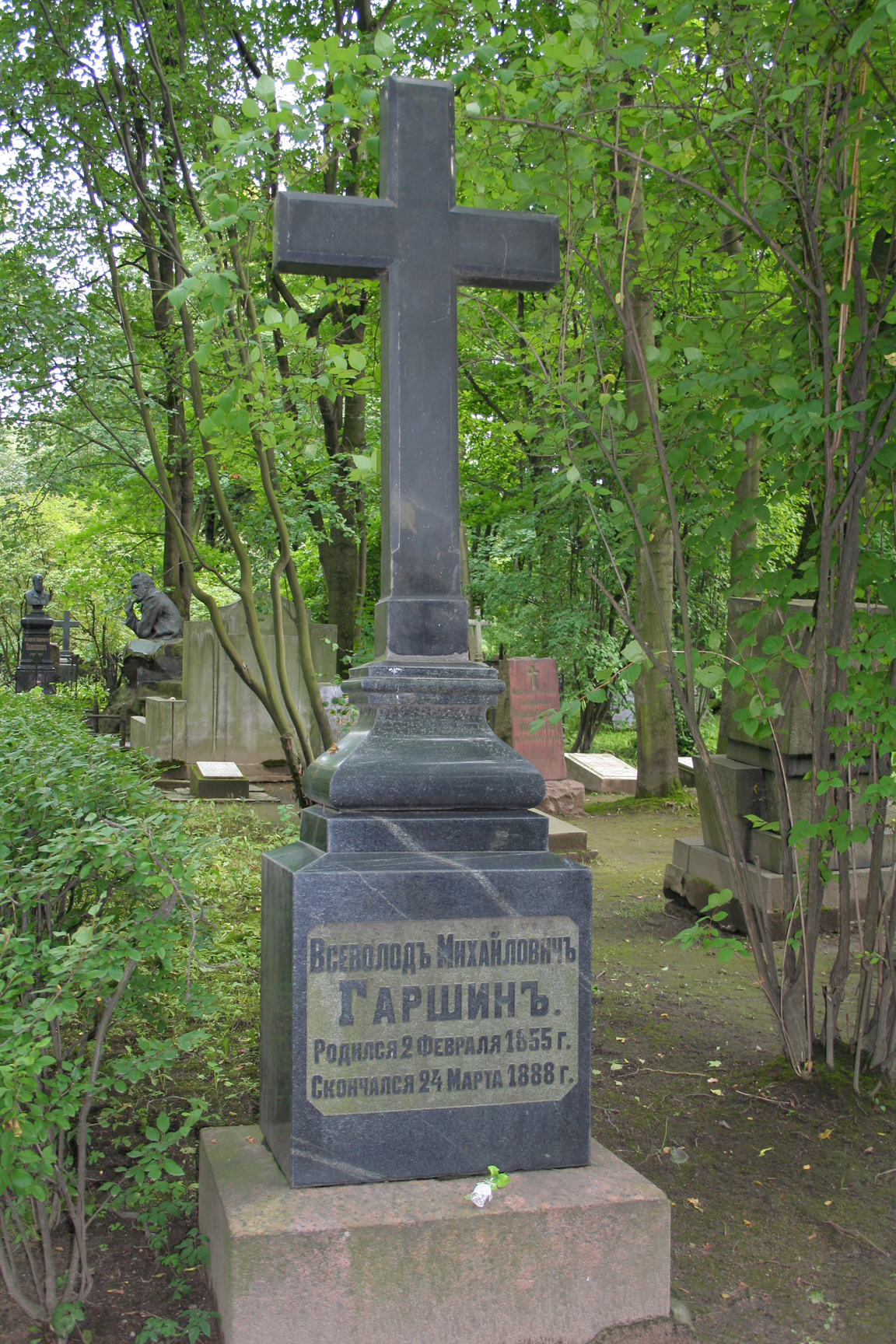
Garshin's grave in Saint Petersburg

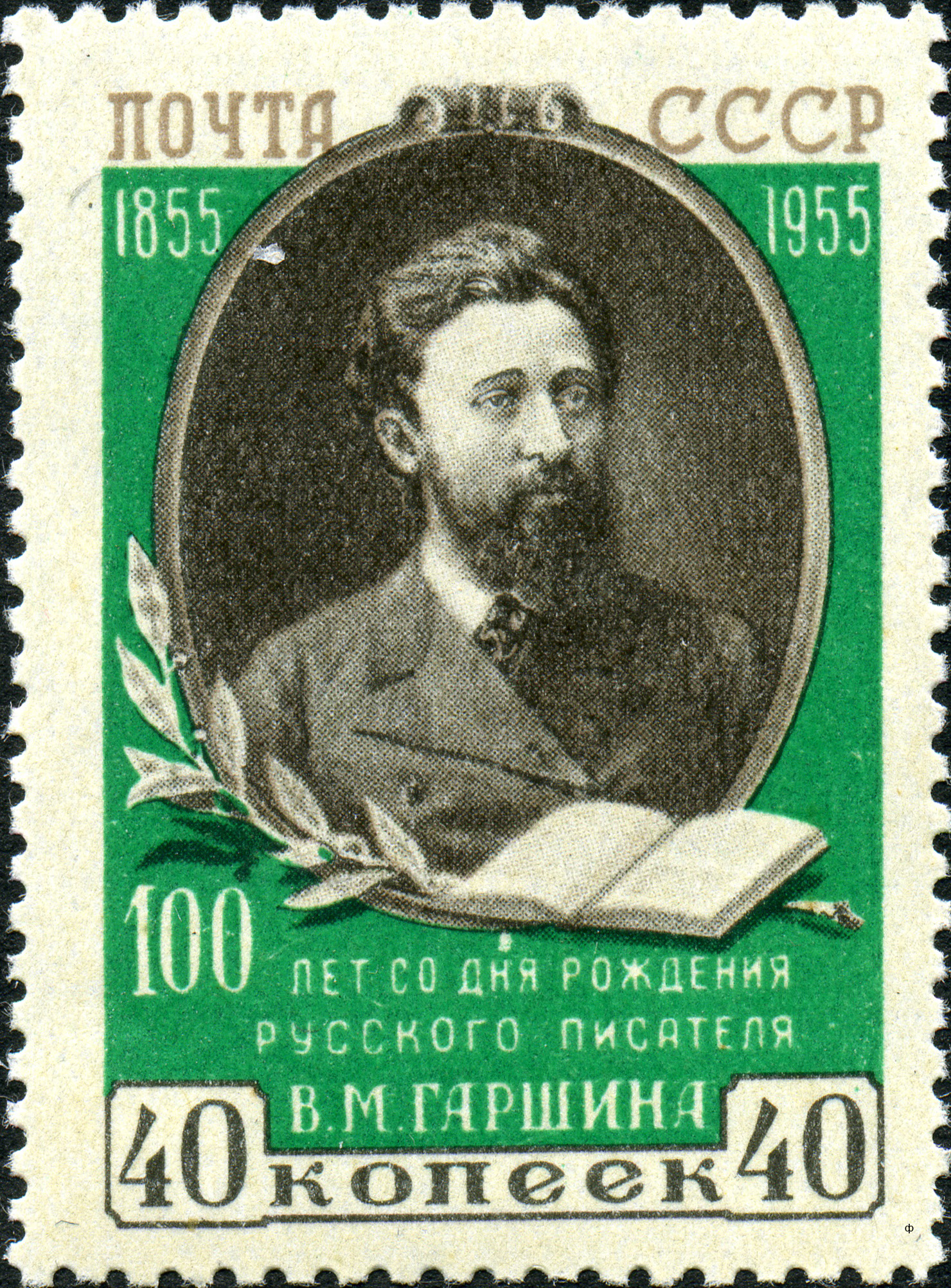
1955 stamp
